= Vasavi Penugonda =

- Village
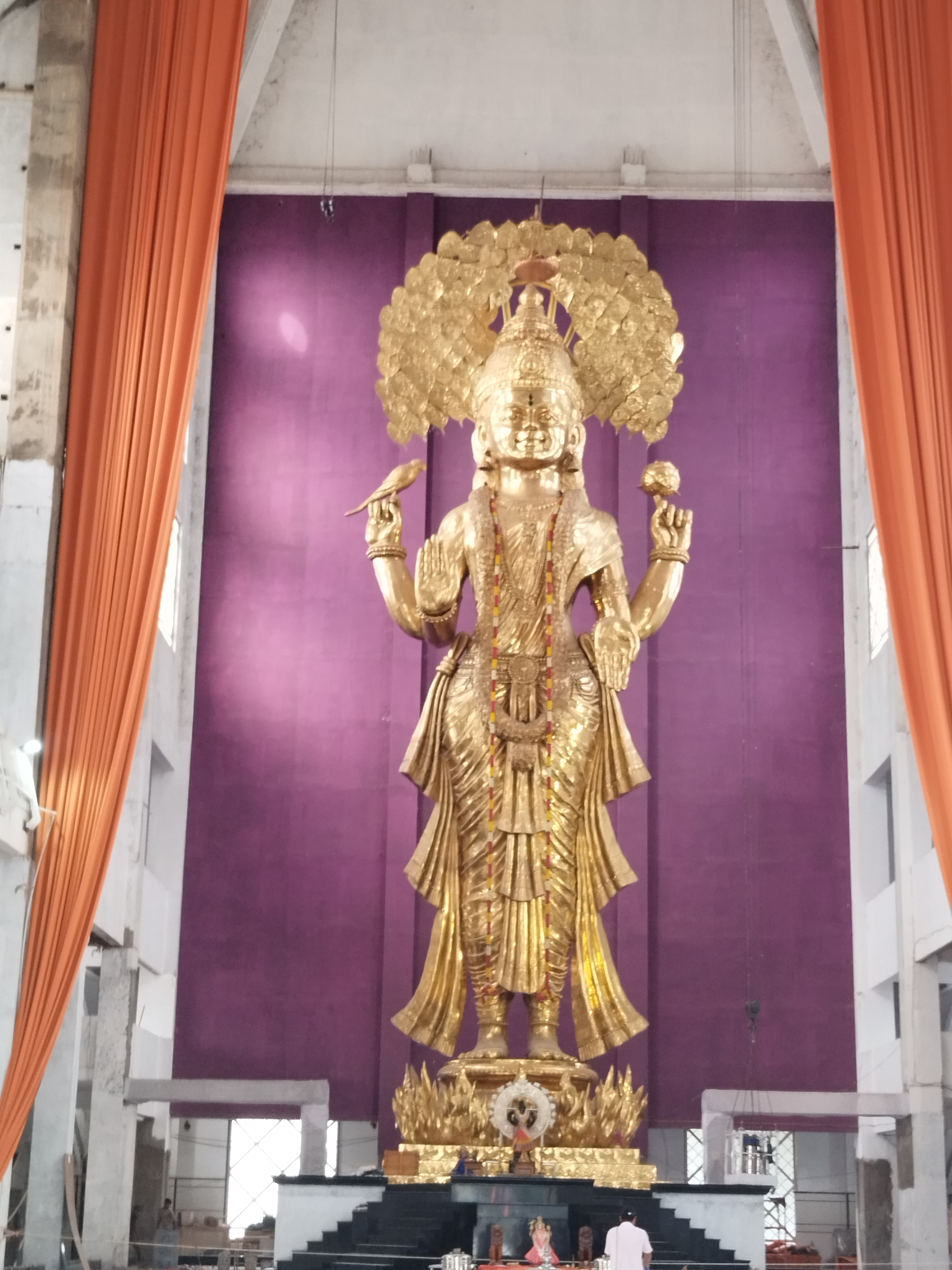
- Vasavi matha Temple

- Location in Andhra Pradesh, India Vasavi Penugonda (India)
- Coordinates: 16.6547°N 81.7445°E
- Country: India
- State: Andhra Pradesh
- District: West Godavari district
- Talukas: Penugonda mandal

Government
  - Type: Panchayati raj
  - Body: Penugonda panchayati

Population (2011)
  - Total: 16,038
  - Rank: 22 in west Godavari 320 in Andhra Pradesh

Languages
  - official: Telugu
- Time zone: UTC+5:30 (IST)
- PIN: 534320
- Telephone code: 08819
- Vehicle registration: AP 37 & AP 39
- Nearest city: Palakollu
- Lok Sabha constituency: Narasapuram
- Vidhan Sabha constituency: Achanta

Penugonda, officially known as Vasavi Penugonda is a historic town in West Godavari district of the Indian state of Andhra Pradesh known as the birthplace of the goddess Vasavi Kanyaka Parameswari.

Narasapuram to Nidadavolu main line passes through Penugonda. It is the junction for the people to go to Rajahmundry, Nidadavolu, Palakollu, Pekeru, Tanuku, and Bhimavaram.

North Peravali Mandal, South Achanta mandal and Poduru mandal, East Godavari River, West Iragavaram mandal and Penumantra mandal sharing boundaries with Vasavi Penugonda.

== Etymology ==
Penugonda name originates from Telugu, traditionally associated with the concept of a "big" or "ancient" hill/abode ("Penu" - big/great; "Gonda/Konda" - hill/abode), linked to myths of saints performing penance.

On 31st December 2025 Penugonda has officially renamed as Vasavi Penugonda by the Government of Andhra Pradesh because it is the birthplace of the goddess Vasavi Kanyaka Parameswari.

== Demographics ==
As of 2011 Census of India, Penugonda had a population of 16038. The total population constitute, 7857 males and 8181 females with a sex ratio of 1041 females per 1000 males. 1377 children are in the age group of 0–6 years, with sex ratio of 1046 females per 1000 males. The average literacy rate stands at 82.50%. Penugonda mandal population of 69857.

== Penugonda mandal ==
Penugonda mandal is one of the mandal in West Godavari district. Under Penugonda there are 14 villages and total it is known as Penugonda Mandal.

Healthcare: Penugonda has very few Hospitals namely Yellapragada Nursing Home and Penugonda Hospitals (24/7).

== Transport ==
The Andhra Pradesh State Road Transport Corporation operates bus services from Penugonda bus station.

== nearest Bus depots ==
Tanuku = 20kms Palakollu = 17kms
