= Bhimavaram mandal =

Bhimavaram Mandal
- Mandal
- Interactive map of Bhimavaram Mandal
- Location in Andhra Pradesh, India
- Coordinates: 16.5333°N 81.5333°E
- Country: India
- State: Andhra Pradesh
- District: West Godavari district
- Headquarters: Bhimavaram

Population (2011)
  - Total: 226,497

Languages
  - Official: Telugu
- Time zone: UTC+5:30 (IST)

Bhimavaram mandal is one of the 19 mandals in West Godavari district of the Indian state of Andhra Pradesh. It has headquarters at Bhimavaram town. The mandal is bounded by Undi mandal, Palacoderu mandal, Veeravasaram mandal, Narasapuram mandal, Mogalthur mandal and Kalla mandal mandals.

== Demographics ==
As of 2011 census, the mandal had a population of 226,497. The total population constitute, 112,283 males and 114,214 females —a sex ratio of 1017 females per 1000 males. 20,991 children are in the age group of 0–6 years, of which 10,596 are boys and 10,395 are girls. The average literacy rate stands at 79.59% with 163,561 literates.

== Government and politics ==
Bhimavaram mandal is one of the 2 mandals under Bhimavaram (Assembly constituency), which in turn represents Narasapuram (Lok Sabha constituency) of Andhra Pradesh. The present MLA representing Bhimavaram (Assembly constituency) is Pulaparthi Ramanjaneyulu of JanaSena Party (NDA Alliance), who won the 2024 Andhra Pradesh Legislative Assembly election.

== Towns and villages ==
As of 2011 census, the mandal has 15 settlements, which includes 1 town and 14 villages. Chinamiram and Rayalam are partly OG's to Bhimavaram (M). Losarigutlapadu village is the most populated and Annavaram village is the least populated settlement in the mandal.

The settlements in the mandal are listed below:

1. Anakoderu
2. Annavaram
3. Bethapudi
4. Bhimavaram (Main)
5. Chinaamiram (part)
6. Dirusumarru
7. Komarada
8. Kovvada
9. kothapusalamarru
10. Narasimhapuram
11. Rayalam (Rural) (part)
12. Taderu
13. Tundurru
14. Vempa
15. Yenamadurru
16. Gollavanitippa
17. Ramayana Puram
18. Deyyalatippa
19. Komatitippa North
20. Gutlapadu
21. Dongapindi
22. Nagidipalem
23. Losari

Notes
(M) denotes a Municipality
Chinaamiram and Rayalam (part) are partly outgrowths to Bhimavaram (M)

== See also ==
- West Godavari district
- Bhimavaram
