= Bhimavaram revenue division =

Administrative division in Andhra Pradesh, India

- Revenue division in West Godavari district
- Country: India
- State: Andhra Pradesh
- District: West Godavari
- Formed: 4 April 2022
- Founder: Government of Andhra Pradesh
- Headquarters: Bhimavaram
- Time zone: UTC+05:30 (IST)

Bhimavaram revenue division is an administrative division in the West Godavari district of the Indian state of Andhra Pradesh. It is one of the 3 Revenue Divisions in the district with 7 mandals under its administration with headquarters at Bhimavaram.

== Administration ==
The 7 mandals in the division are Bhimavaram mandal, Veeravasaram mandal, Palakoderu mandal, Kalla mandal, Undi mandal,Akiveedu mandal and Ganapavaram mandal

== See also ==
- List of revenue divisions in Andhra Pradesh
- List of mandals in Andhra Pradesh
