= Yelamanchili mandal =

Yalamanchili mandal
- Mandal
- Interactive Map Outlining mandal
- Location in Andhra Pradesh, India
- Coordinates: 16.480°N 81.781°E
- Country: India
- State: Andhra Pradesh
- District: West Godavari
- Headquarters: Yalamanchili

Government
  - Body: Mandal Parishad

Area
  - Total: 86.99 km^{2} (33.59 sq mi)
- Elevation: 14 m (46 ft)

Population (2011)
  - Total: 71,890
  - Density: 826.4/km^{2} (2,140/sq mi)

Languages
  - Official: Telugu
- Time zone: UTC+5:30 (IST)
- Vehicle registration: AP 37
- Nearest city: Palakollu

Yalamanchili mandal is amongst the 46 mandals in West Godavari district of the state of Andhra Pradesh in India. Its headquarters are located in the village of Yalamanchili. The mandal is bordered by the Godavari River to the north and east, the Palacole mandal to the south, and the Poduru and Achanta mandals to the west.

== Demographics ==
The 2011 census reported a population of 71,890 people, (36,501 males and 35,389 females, for a ratio of 970 females per 1000 males) living in 20,414 households. There were 6,787 children 0–6 years of age, 3,500 boys and 3,287 girls. There were 50,541 persons (26,772 males and 23,769 females) in Yelamanchili classified as literate, making Yelamanchili's average literacy rate 77.63%. The majority of the population, 16,740 people, was identified as Scheduled Caste, and 329 as Scheduled Tribe.

=== Work profile ===
According to the 2011 census, 32,774 people (22,664 males and 10,110 females) from Yelamanchili were engaged in work activity. 26,058 workers described their work as "main work", 2,791 as "cultivators", 17,135 as "agricultural laborers", 397 as "household industry" workers, 5,735 as involved in "other works", and 6,716 as "marginal workers".

== Administration ==
Yelamanchili mandal is administered under the Palakol Assembly constituency of the Narsapuram Lok Sabha constituency and is one of the twelve mandals of the Narasapuram revenue division.

== Villages ==
According to the 2011 census, Yelamanchili mandal contains Total the following 32 settlements But Two settlements (Kontheru and Adavipalem) Merged Palakollu Municipality on Dated 7 January 2020. and remaining Present the following 30 settlements (all villages):

1. Abbirajupalem
2. Aryapeta
3. Burugupalle
4. Badava
5. Chinchinada
6. Chinthadibba
7. Doddipatla
8. Gumparru
9. Gangadapalem
10. Ilapakurru
11. Kalagampudi
12. Kaza East
13. Kaza West
14. Kattukaluva
15. KS Palem
16. Kanakayalanka
17. Kambotlapalem
18. Lakshmipalem
19. Medapadu
20. Matlapalem
21. Neredumilli
22. Narnimeraka
23. Penumarru
24. Pedalanka
25. Siragalapalle
26. Utada
27. Vaddilanka
28. Yelamanchili East
29. Yelamanchili West
30. Yenuguvanilanka

Of these, Doddipatla is the largest and Utada the smallest in population.

== Education ==
The mandal plays an important role in the education of rural students from nearby villages. Primary and secondary education is provided by the government under the state's School Education Department. According to the report for the academic year of 2015–16, the mandal has more than 6,957 students enrolled in over 94 schools.

== See also ==
- List of mandals in Andhra Pradesh
- Eluru
