= Relangi, West Godavari district =

Coordinates: 16.705°N 81.647°E

Relangi is a village in Iragavaram mandal of West Godavari district in Andhra Pradesh (post code 534225). It is 5.9 km from its mandal Iragavaram, 13 km from Pekeru, 74 km from Rajahmundry and 138 km from the city of Vijayawada.

Relangi is surrounded by paddy fields. This village has two deities, popularly known as Sri Peda Mantalamba and Sri China Mantalamba. This village has mythological history connected to Ramayana time. Legends say that these two deities were emerged from the yagna kunda conducted by the Brahmarshi Vishwamitra which was guarded by the Princes Rama and Lakshmana. The name Relangi came from the name of the lady demon Tataki whose death happened in the hands of Rama before commencing yagna by Vishwamitra. Tataki's head fell in this place so the name of this place has become Raalindi (fallen in Telugu) later becoming Relangi due to pronunciation problems of Britishers. To support this story, the village has a Shiva temple named as "Taatakeswaraswaamy" which was said to be installed by Prince Rama as a means of praayaschitta (atone for) towards killing of woman demon.

== Transport ==
Local trains running between Nidadavolu and Bhimavaram stop in this village. Bus facility is also available between Tanuku and Bhimavaram.

== Famous culture ==
The movie Seethamma Vakitlo Sirimalle Chettu mentions Relangi, and also the father character Relangi mavayya played by Prakash Raj made this place even more famous.
