= Relangi =

Relangi may refer to:

- Relangi, West Godavari district, village in Andhra Pradesh, India
- Relangi, Alluri Sitharama Raju district, a village in Andhra Pradesh, India
- Relangi (actor) (1910–1975), Indian actor, comedian and producer predominantly in Telugu cinema
- Relangi Narasimha Rao (born 1951), Indian film director in Telugu cinema
- Relangi Selvarajah (1960–2005), Sri Lankan Tamil broadcaster and actress
