= Ganapavaram mandal =

- Mandal
- Interactive Map Outlining mandal
- Location in Andhra Pradesh, India
- Coordinates: 16.70°N 81.45°E
- Country: India
- State: Andhra Pradesh
- District: West Godavari district
- Headquarters: Ganapavaram

Government
  - Body: Mandal Parishad

Area
  - Total: 99.85 km^{2} (38.55 sq mi)

Population (2011)
  - Total: 64,963
  - Density: 650.6/km^{2} (1,685/sq mi)

Languages
  - Official: Telugu
- Time zone: UTC+5:30 (IST)

Ganapavaram mandal is one of the 20 mandals in West Godavari district of the Indian state of Andhra Pradesh. It is under the administration of Bhimavaram revenue division and the headquarters are located at Ganapavaram. Ganapavaram Mandal is bounded by Nidamarru Mandal towards west, Pentapadu Mandal towards North, Undi Mandal towards South, Unguturu Mandal towards North . Tadepalligudem, Bhimavaram, Tanuku, Eluru are the nearby Cities to Ganapavaram. It is located 55 km from Eluru and 22 km from Bhimavaram.

== Demographics ==
As of 2011 census, the mandal had a population of 64,963 with 18,622 households. The total population constitute, 32,519 males and 32,444 females —a sex ratio of 997 females per 1000 males. 5,894 children are in the age group of 0–6 years, of which 2,957 are boys and 2,937 are girls. The literacy rate stands at 68.35% with 44,406 literates.

The mandal does not have any sort of Urban population and Area.

== Governance ==
=== Administration ===
As of 2011 census, the mandal has thirty villages and twenty five panchayats, of which all of them are villages. Velagapalle is the smallest Village and Ganapavaram is the biggest Village in terms of population The settlements in the mandal are listed below:

1. Agraharagopavaram
2. Ardhavaram
3. Cherukuganuma Agraharam
4. Chinaramachandrapuram
5. Dasulakumudavalli
6. Ganapavaram
7. Jagannadhapuram
8. Jallikakinada
9. Kasipadu
10. Kesavaram
11. Komarru
12. Kommara
13. Kothapalle
14. Moyyeru
15. Muggula
16. Mupparthipadu
17. Pippara
18. Saripalle
19. Seethalamkonde Padu
20. Vakapalle
21. Valluru
22. Varadarajapuram
23. Veereswarapuram
24. Velagapalle
25. Venkatrajapuram

Notes
(†) Mandal headquarter

=== Politics ===
Ganapavaram mandal is one of the mandals under Unguturu (Assembly constituency), which in turn represents Eluru (Lok Sabha constituency) of Andhra Pradesh.

== Education ==
The primary and secondary school education is imparted by mandal parishad, zilla parishad, government and private schools, which are both aided and unaided, under the administration of the School Education Department of the state. The medium of instruction followed by different schools are English, Telugu.

Important colleges in Ganapavaram are S C B R Govt Junior College, Chanakya Junior College, (CH.VPMR) Government Degree College and Smt. Gottumukkala Swaraswathi Degree College. There are many schools in Ganapavaram. Gurajada Vidyaniketan, Vidya Jyothi Merit School and Maria Montessori School teaches in English medium whereas, Zilla Parishad High Schools in Telugu medium.

== See also ==
- List of mandals in Andhra Pradesh
