= Kalla =

- Village
- Interactive map of Kalla
- Location in Andhra Pradesh, India Kalla (India)
- Coordinates: 16.537361°N 81.408666°E
- Country: India
- State: Andhra Pradesh
- District: West Godavari
- Mandal: Kalla

Languages
  - Official: Telugu
- Time zone: UTC+5:30 (IST)
- PIN: 534237
- Telephone code: 08816
- Vehicle registration: AP37

Kalla is a village in West Godavari district of the Indian state of Andhra Pradesh and the zonal centre of Kalla mandal. The nearest train station is Akividu (AKVD) located at a distance of 6.63 km.

== Demographics ==
As of 2011 Census of India, Kalla is a large village and Official zonal center for 13 villages, kalla is located in West Godavari district, Andhra Pradesh with total 1901 families residing. The Kalla village has population of 6853 of which 3431 are males while 3422 are females as per Population Census 2011.

In Kalla village population of children with age 0-6 is 681 which makes up 9.94 % of total population of village. Average Ratio of Kalla village is 997 which is higher than Andhra Pradesh state average of 993. Child Ratio for the Kalla as per census is 1070, higher than Andhra Pradesh average of 939.

Kalla village has higher literacy rate compared to Andhra Pradesh. In 2011, literacy rate of Kalla village was 71.47 % compared to 67.02 % of Andhra Pradesh. In Kalla Male literacy stands at 84.73 % while female literacy rate was 71.21 %. Pin code is 534237

As per constitution of India and Panchyati Raaj Act, Kalla village is administrated by Sarpanch (Head of Village) who is elected representative of village,
