= Chilukuru =

- Village
- Interactive map of Chilukuru
- Location in Andhra Pradesh, India
- Coordinates: 16°36′35″N 81°29′39″E
- Country: India
- State: Andhra Pradesh
- District: West Godavari

Government
  - MLA: Mantena Ramaraju
- Elevation: 2 m (6.6 ft)

Population (2011)
  - Total: 2,127

Languages
  - Official: Telugu
- Time zone: UTC+5:30 (IST)
- PIN: 534199
- Vehicle registration: AP37
- Nearest city: Bhimavaram
- Lok Sabha constituency: Narsapuram
- Vidhan Sabha constituency: Undi
- Climate: hot (Köppen)

Chilukuru is a village in Undi mandal of West Godavari district in the south Indian state of Andhra Pradesh. It is located about 40 kilometers from Eluru town.
