= Veeravasaram mandal =

- Mandal
- Interactive Map Outlining mandal
- Location in Andhra Pradesh, India
- Coordinates: 16.537°N 81.625°E
- Country: India
- State: Andhra Pradesh
- District: West Godavari
- Established: 1963
- Headquarters: Veeravasaram

Government
  - Body: Mandal Parishad

Area
  - Total: 94.45 km^{2} (36.47 sq mi)
- Elevation: 13 m (43 ft)

Population (2011)
  - Total: 64,912
  - Density: 687.3/km^{2} (1,780/sq mi)

Languages
  - Official: Telugu
- Time zone: UTC+5:30 (IST)
- Vehicle registration: AP 37

Veeravasaram Mandal is a Mandal in the West Godavari District of the Indian state of Andhra Pradesh.

== Geography ==
It is bordered by the Palacole Mandal to the North, the Narasapuram Mandal to the East, the Palacoderu Mandal to the South, and the Penumantra Mandal to the West. The administrative offices are headquartered in the town of Veeravasaram.

== Demographics ==
The 2011 the census showed a population of 64,912 people in 18,260 households, with 32,803 males and 32,109 females for a female-to-male ratio of 979 to 1000. The census reported 5,953 children 0–6 (3,080 boys and 2,873 girls). The average literacy rate was 76.74%, with 45,248 literate individuals (24,009 male and 21,239 female).

The plurality of the population were members of a Scheduled caste, numbering 12,958. Scheduled tribe members numbered 740.

== Economy ==
The 2011 Indian Census, found that 29,842 members of the total population of Veeravasaram Mandal were employed. 19,806 were male and 10,036 were female.

20,934 workers described their work as full-time. Of these, 2,114 worked as cultivators, 13,396 worked as agricultural laborers, 314 worked in household industries and 5,110 were involved in other occupations. The remaining 8,908 were marginal workers.

== Administration ==
The Veeravasaram Mandal is administered under Bhimavaram (Assembly constituency) of Narsapuram (Lok Sabha constituency) and is one of the twelve Mandals that fall under the Narasapuram revenue division.

== Towns and villages ==
As of 2011 census, Veeravasaram Mandal was made up of 14 settlements:

- Andaluru
- Bobbanapalle
- Konithiwada
- Machipuri
- Machipuripalem
- Madugupolavaram
- Mentepudi
- Navuduru
- Nelapogula
- Panjavemavaram
- Rayakuduru
- Thokalapudi
- Tholeru
- Veeravasaram

Veeravasaram had the largest population and Mandepudi/Mentepudi the smallest.

== Education ==
The Mandal plays a major role in education for the children of the area. Primary and secondary school education is administered by the government under the School Education Department of the state. In the 2015-16 academic year, the Mandal reported more than 7,652 students enrolled in over 88 schools.

== See also ==
- List of Mandals in Andhra Pradesh
- Eluru
