= Chinamiram =

- Village
- Interactive map of Chinamiram
- Location within Andhra Pradesh
- Coordinates: 16°32′26″N 81°29′43″E
- Country: India
- State: Andhra Pradesh
- District: West Godavari
- Out Growth: Bhimavaram

Population (2011)
  - Total: 4,699 {part}
- Time zone: UTC+05:30 (IST)

Chinamiram is a village in Bhimavaram mandal, located in West Godavari district of the Indian state of Andhra Pradesh. As of 2011 census, the village partly an out growth to Bhimavaram city.

== Government and politics ==
Chinamiram gram panchayat is the local self-government of the village. The elected members of the gram panchayat is headed by a sarpanch. The sarpanch of the village srinivasa Raju was awarded Nirmala Grama Puraskaram for the year 2013. The efforts put by local community and administration yielded outstanding results. Chinamiram village in Bhimavaram Mandal of West Godavari district has been declared as "Smart Village " In the country. The village Panchayat has introduced several measures in the maintenance of drainage system, drinking water supply, road network development. The panchayat had increased taxes to meet the financial needs to strengthen the village infrastructure. It succeeded in generating Rs one crore revenues through various measures. The village has adopted welfare, development and health as the main parameters for the overall development of the village. The village also stood role model to many habitations in Andhra Pradesh.

https://www.thehansindia.com/posts/index/Andhra-Pradesh/2018-02-17/Andhra-Village-declared-as-Smart-Village-in-India/359739

== Demographics ==
As of 2011 Census of India, Chinamiram had a population of 4699. The total population constitute, 2304 males and 2395 females with a sex ratio of 1039 females per 1000 males. 439 children are in the age group of 0–6 years, with sex ratio of 1111. The average literacy rate stands at 78.78%.
