= Eletipadu =

Eletipadu Yeletipadu
- Town
- Interactive map of Eletipadu
- Location in Andhra Pradesh, India
- Coordinates: 16.68469°N 81.7395°E
- Country: India
- State: Andhra Pradesh
- District: West Godavari

Population (2011)
  - Total: 1,852

Languages
  - Official: Telugu
- Time zone: UTC+5:30 (IST)
- Vehicle registration: AP-39

Eletipadu is located in the Iragavaram mandal, West Godavari district, Andhra Pradesh, India, just west of the river Godavari. It is one of the oldest localities west of Pekeru town and Ithempudi. Historically, Eletipadu's main industry is agriculture.

== Demographics ==
As of 2011 Census of India, Eletipadu had a population of 1852. The total population constitute, 939 males and 913 females with a sex ratio of 972 females per 1000 males. 163 children are in the age group of 0–6 years, with sex ratio of 791. The average literacy rate stands at 81.71%.
