= Doddipatla =

- Village
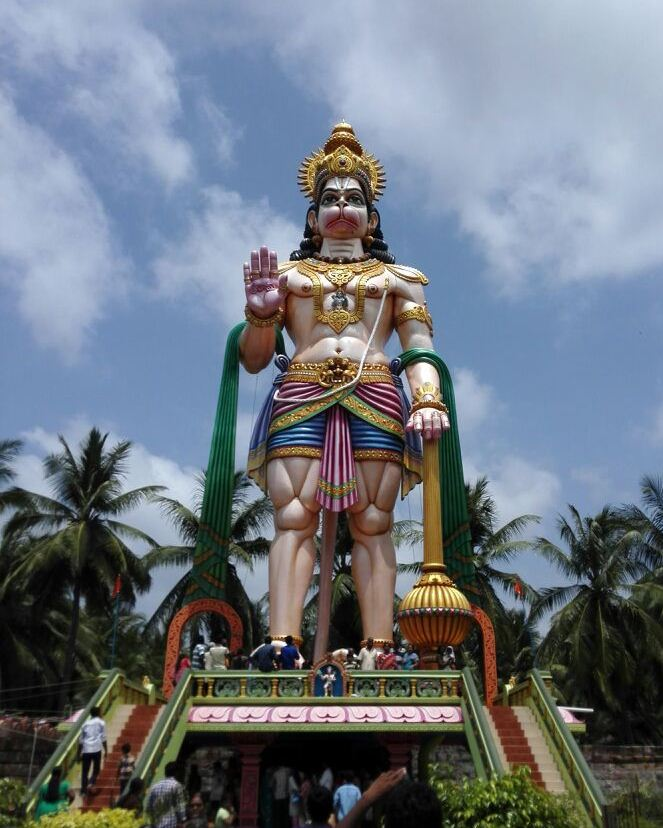
- Hanuman Statue in Abbirajupalem in Doddipatle
- Interactive map of Doddipatla
- Location in Andhra Pradesh, India
- Coordinates: 16°31′0″N 81°50′37″E
- State: Andhra Pradesh
- District: West Godavari
- Mandal: Yelamanchili

Population (2011)
  - Total: 13,258

Languages
  - Official: Telugu
- Time zone: UTC+5:30 (IST)
- PIN: 534 xxx
- Telephone code: +91–8814
- Parliament constituency: Narasapuram
- Assembly constituency: Palakollu
- Nearest city: Palakollu

Doddipatla is a village in West Godavari district of the Indian state of Andhra Pradesh. It is located in Yelamanchili Mandal. The nearest railway station is at Palakollu (PKO) located at a distance of 15 kms

== Geography ==
Doddipatla is Located at Latitude of 16°31'0"N & Longitude of 81°50'37"E.

== Demographics ==
As of 2011 Census of India, Doddipatla had a population of 13258. The total population constitute, 6835 males and 6423 females with a sex ratio of 940 females per 1000 males. 1333 children are in the age group of 0–6 years, with sex ratio of 940. The average literacy rate stands at 74.46%.
