= Chilukuri =

Chilukuri (Telugu: చిలుకూరి) is a Telugu surname. Notable people with the surname include:

- Chilukuri Narayana Rao (1890–1952), Indian writer, lexicographer, historian and scholar
- Chilukuri Veerabhadrarao (1872–1939), Indian historian
- Lakshmi Chilukuri (born 1961), Indian-American microbiologist, educator, and academic administrator
- Usha Vance (née Chilukuri) (born 1986), Second Lady of the United States
