= Palacoderu mandal =

Palakoderu mandal
- Mandal
- Interactive Map Outlining mandal
- Location in Andhra Pradesh, India
- Coordinates: 16.586°N 81.545°E
- Country: India
- State: Andhra Pradesh
- District: West Godavari
- Headquarters: Palakoderu

Government
  - Body: Mandal Parishad

Area
  - Total: 92.78 km^{2} (35.82 sq mi)

Population (2011)
  - Total: 66,119
  - Density: 712.6/km^{2} (1,846/sq mi)

Languages
  - Official: Telugu
- Time zone: UTC+5:30 (IST)
- Vehicle registration: AP 37

Palakoderu mandal is one of the 19 mandals in the West Godavari district of the Indian state of Andhra Pradesh. The headquarters are located at Palakoderu town. The mandal is bordered by Veeravasaram mandal to the north, Bhimavaram mandal to the east, Undi mandal to the south and Attili mandal to the west.

== Demographics ==
As of 2011 census, the mandal had a population of 66,119 in 19,149 households. The total population consists of 32,927 males and 33,192 females with a sex ratio of 1,008 females per 1000 males. 6,247 children are in the age group of 0–6 years, of which 3,218 are boys and 3,029 are girls with a sex ratio of 941. The average literacy rate stands at 76.96% with 46,075 literates of which 24,015 are males and 22,060 are females. The majority of the population identifies as Scheduled Caste with a population of 11,208; Scheduled Tribe has a population of 606.

=== Work Profile ===
As per the report published by Census India in 2011, 30,140 people were engaged in work activities out of the total population of Palacoderu mandal which includes 20,397 males and 9,743 females.

According to the census 2011 survey report, 22,958 workers describe their work as main work, with the breakdown as follows; 2,292 are cultivators, 13,838 are agricultural labourers, 425 are in household industry and 6,403 are involved in other jobs. Of these, 7,182 are marginal workers.

== Administration ==
Palacoderu mandal is administered under Undi (Assembly constituency) of Narsapuram (Lok Sabha constituency) and one of the twelve mandals that falls under Narasapuram revenue division.

== Towns and villages ==
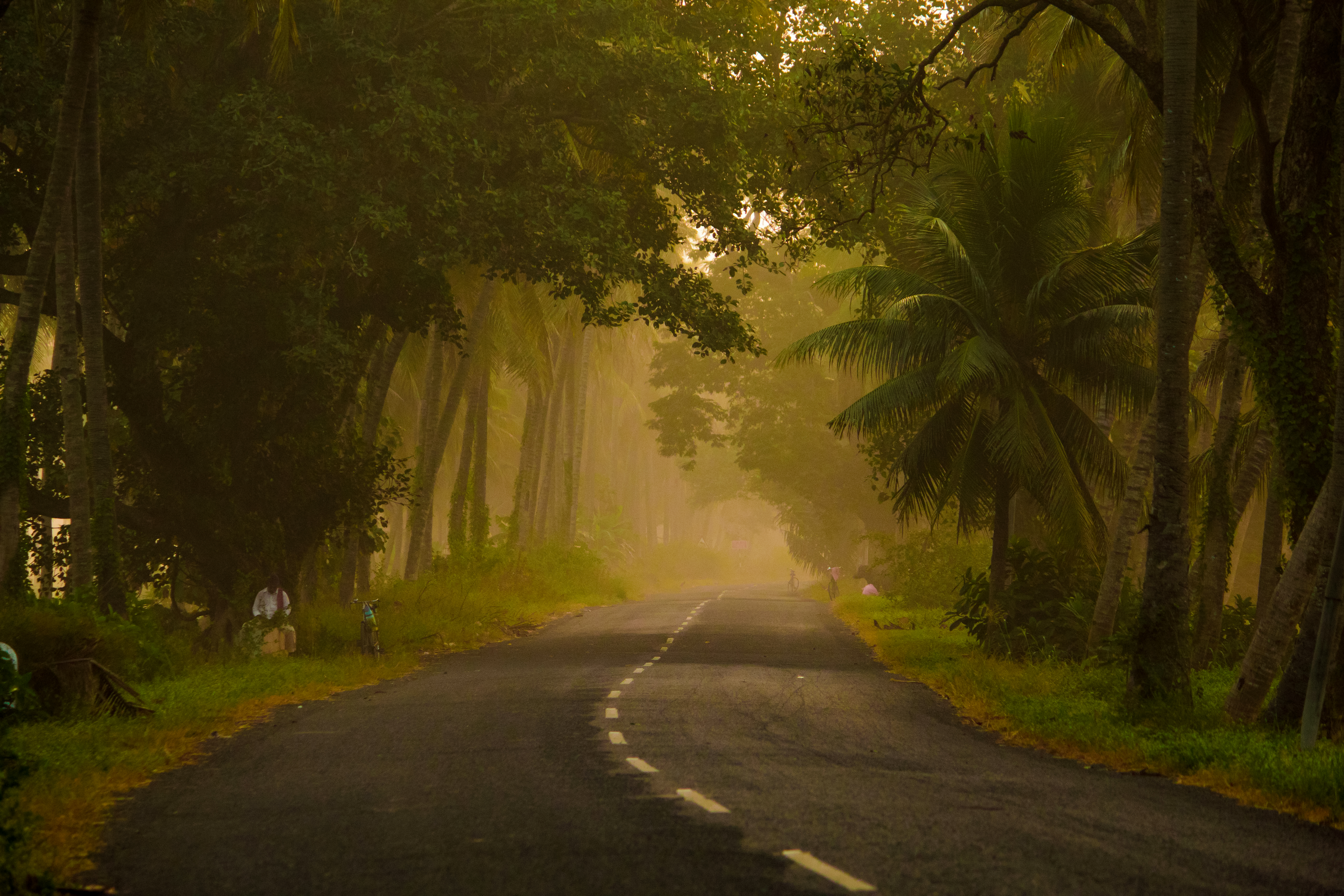
Vendra - Ramachandrapuram road near Kondepudi

As of 2011 census, the mandal has 14 settlements, of which all are villages. Srungavruksham is the largest and Vendra Agraharam is the smallest village in terms of population.

The settlements in the mandal are listed below:

1. Garagaparru
2. Gollalakoderu
3. Goraganamudi
4. Kondepudi
5. Korukollu
6. Kumudavalli
7. Mogallu
8. Mypa
9. Palakoderu
10. Pennada
11. Srungavruksham
12. Vendra
13. Vendra
14. Vissakoderu

== Education ==
The mandal plays a major role in education for the rural students of the nearby villages. Primary and secondary school education is imparted by government, aided and private schools, under the School Education Department of the state. As per the school information report for the academic year 2015–16, the mandal has more than 7,510 students enrolled in over 67 schools.

== Sports ==
=== Badminton Indoor Stadium ===
- PRO Badminton Indoor Stadium & Academy (5 Courts), ,

== See also ==
- List of mandals in Andhra Pradesh
