= Ganapavaram, West Godavari district =

Ganapavaram
- Village
- Interactive map of Ganapavaram
- Location in Andhra Pradesh, India Ganapavaram (India)
- Coordinates: 16.7000°N 81.4667°E
- Country: India
- State: Andhra Pradesh
- District: West Godavari
- Mandal: Ganapavaram
- Elevation: 8 m (26 ft)

Population (2011)
  - Total: 11,749

Languages
  - Official: Telugu
- Time zone: UTC+5:30 (IST)
- PIN: 534198
- 08818: 8 km
- Vehicle registration: AP

Ganapavaram is a village in Ganapavaram mandal of West Godavari district of the Indian state of Andhra Pradesh. It is also the headquarters of Ganapavaram mandal.

== Geography ==
The village is located at 16° 42' 0" North, 81° 28' 0" East. Ganapavaram is located between the Tadepalligudem and Bhimavaram. It has an average elevation of 14 metres (46 ft).

== Demographics ==
As of 2011 Census of India, Ganapavaram had a population of 11749. The total population constitute, 5779 males and 5790 females with a sex ratio of 1033 females per 1000 males. 996 children are in the age group of 0–6 years, with sex ratio of 1000. The average literacy rate stands at 79.02%.
