= Chilukuri Veerabhadrarao =

Indian historian

Chilukuri Veerabhadrao
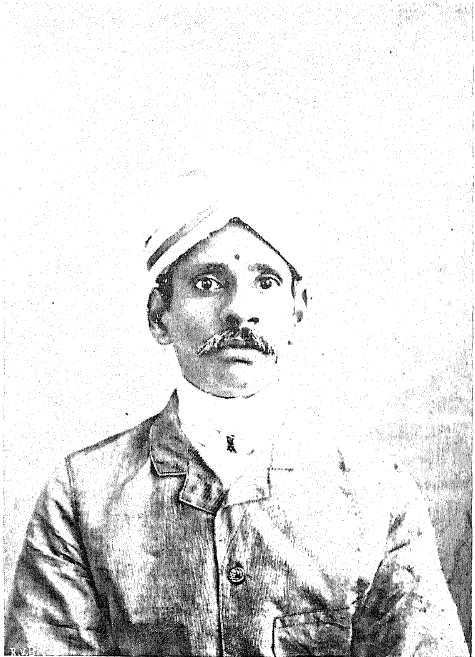
- Born: 17 October 1872; Relangi, West Godavari, Andhra Pradesh.
- Died: 1939 (aged 66–67)
- Occupation: Historian

Chilukulri Veerabhadra Rao (1872–1939) was an Indian historian. He was born in Relangi village of West Godavari District of British India in 1872. He worked for several journals, including Desopakari, Andhra Desaabhimani, Vibhudaranjani, Aandhra kesar and Satyavaadi. During 1909–1912, he lived in Chennai and wrote a five-volume History of Andhras, which is a first. Andhra Mahasabha recognised his contribution with a title called "Chaturanana" (meaning creator of History). He died in 1939.
