= Dirusumarru =

- village
- Interactive map of Dirusumarru
- Location in Andhra Pradesh, India Dirusumarru (India)
- Coordinates: 16.4722016°N 81.5294716°E
- Country: India
- State: Andhra Pradesh
- District: West Godavari

Languages
  - Official: Telugu
- Time zone: UTC+5:30 (IST)
- Vehicle registration: AP
- Nearest city: Bhimavaram
- Lok Sabha constituency: Narasapuram
- Vidhan Sabha constituency: Bhimavaram

Dirusumarru is a village in Andhra Pradesh, India. It is located in West Godavari district and is a few miles away from Bhimavaram. Along with Vempa, a neighbouring village, it is known for aquaculture. The nearest railway station is Bhimavaram JN (BVRM) located at a distance of 7 km and vempa.

== Demographics ==
As of 2011 Census of India, Dirusumarru had a population of 8645. The total population constitute, 4358 males and 4287 females with a sex ratio of 984 females per 1000 males. 852 children are in the age group of 0–6 years, with sex ratio of 1063. The average literacy rate stands at 71.45%.
