= Iragavaram mandal =

Iragavaram Mandal
- Mandal
- Interactive map of Iragavaram Mandal
- Location in Andhra Pradesh, India
- Coordinates: 16°40′47″N 81°42′34″E
- Country: India
- State: Andhra Pradesh
- District: West Godavari
- Headquarters: Iragavaram

Government
  - Body: Mandal Parishad

Area
  - Total: 81.19 km^{2} (31.35 sq mi)
- Elevation: 14 m (46 ft)

Population (2011)
  - Total: 65,831
  - Density: 810.8/km^{2} (2,100/sq mi)

Languages
  - Official: Telugu
- Time zone: UTC+5:30 (IST)
- Vehicle registration: AP 39

Iragavaram Mandal is one of the 46 mandals in the West Godavari district of the Indian state of Andhra Pradesh. The headquarters are located at Iragavaram village. The mandal is bordered by Peravali mandal and Penugonda mandal to the north, Penumantra mandal to the east, Attili mandal to the south, and Tanuku mandal to the west. Pekeru is its town in the mandal.

== Demographics ==
As of the 2011 census, the mandal had a population of 65,831 in 19,482 households. The total population included 33,202 males and 32,629 females with a sex ratio of 983 females per 1000 males. There were 6,283 children in the age group of 0–6 years, of which 3,205 were boys and 3,078 were girls with a sex ratio of 960. The average literacy rate stood at 77.39% (46,084) of which 24,341 were male and 21,743 were female. There were 11,586 people from a Scheduled Caste and 485 from a Scheduled Tribe.

=== Employment ===
As per the report published by Census India in 2011, the unemployment rate was 56%, with only 28,956 people (44%) of the Iragavaram Mandal total population employed. The employment ratio by gender is roughly 70/30 male/female (20,631 males and 8,325 females). According to the census, 24,751 workers had worked for at least six months out of the last year; of these, 3,260 worked as cultivators, 15,438 as agricultural labourers, 461 in household industry, and 5,592 in other work. There were also 4,205 workers who worked for three to six months out of the preceding year.

== Administration ==
Iragavaram mandal is administered under the Tanuku assembly constituency of Narsapuram and is one of the twelve mandals in the Narasapuram revenue division.

== Towns and villages ==
According to the 2011 census, the mandal has 21 settlements, all of which are villages and towns. Pekeru is the largest town and Garuvuguntakhandrika is the smallest in population.

The settlements in the mandal are:

1. Eletipadu
2. Garuvuguntakhandrika
3. Goteru
4. Inaparru
5. Iragavaram
6. Ayithampudi
7. Kakileru
8. Kakulaillindalaparru
9. Kannayakumudavalli
10. Kantheru
11. Kathavapadu
12. Kavalipuram
13. Kothapadu
14. Ogidi
15. Pekeru
16. Podalada
17. Rapaka
18. Relangi
19. Repakakhandrika
20. Surampudi
21. Thurupuvipparru

== Education ==
The Mandal plays a major role in education for the rural students of the nearby villages. Primary and secondary school education is imparted by the government, aided by private schools, under the School Education Department of the state. As of the 2015–16 academic year, the mandal had more than 6,167 students enrolled in over 70 schools.

== See also ==
- List of mandals in Andhra Pradesh
- Eluru
