= Penumantra mandal =

Penumantra
- Mandal
- Interactive Map Outlining mandal
- Location in Andhra Pradesh, India
- Coordinates: 16°38′N 81°38′E
- Country: India
- State: Andhra Pradesh
- District: West Godavari
- Headquarters: Penumantra

Government
  - Body: Mandal Parishad

Area
  - Total: 82.06 km^{2} (31.68 sq mi)
- Elevation: 14 m (46 ft)

Population (2011)
  - Total: 60,153
  - Density: 733.0/km^{2} (1,899/sq mi)

Languages
  - Official: Telugu
- Time zone: UTC+5:30 (IST)
- Vehicle registration: AP 37

Penumantra Mandal is one of the 46 mandals (administrative divisions) in the West Godavari district of the Indian state of Andhra Pradesh. Its headquarters arevin Penumantra.

== Geography ==
The Mandal is bordered by Penugonda Mandal in the north, Poduru Mandal and Veeravasaram Mandal in the east, Attili Mandal to the south, and Iragavaram Mandal to the west.

== Demographics ==
In the 2011 census, Penumantra Mandal had a population of 60,153 in 16,952 households. The population split is 30,043 males and 30,110 females, a gender ratio of 501 females per 500 males. 5,309 children are 0-6, 2,744 boys and 2,565 girls. The average literacy rate stands at 80.19% with a literate population of 43,982, 22,817 males and 21,165 females.

12,780 people belong to the 307 Scheduled Castes.

== Economy ==
Per 2011 Census India 27,257 people were engaged in work, 18,801 male and 8,456 female.

21,131 people described formal employment as their main job. Major employment sectors include 3,248 cultivators, 12,609 agricultural labourers and 200 in the householder industry. 5,074 were involved in other forms of employment. 6,126 were marginal workers.

== Administration ==
Penumantra Mandal is administered by Achanta (Assembly constituency) of Narsapuram (Lok Sabha constituency) and is one of the twelve Mandals that falls under Narasapuram Revenue Sub Division.

== Towns and villages ==
According to the 2011 census, Penumantra Mandal has 16 settlements made up of small villages. Penumantra is the most populated village and Mallipudi is the least.

The settlements in Mandal are:

- [[Alamuru
- Bhatlamagutur
- Juttiga
- Koyyetipadu
- Mallipudi
- Mamuduru
- Marteru
- Nattarameswaram
- Neggipudi
- Nelamuru
- Oduru
- Penumantra
- Polamuru
- Satyavaram
- Somarajuillindalaparru
- Velagaleru]]

== Education ==
The Mandal plays a major role in educating rural students from nearby villages. The government provides primary and secondary school education. Other schools are private, supported, and belong to the School Education Department of the state. According to the school information report for 2015–16, the Mandal has more than 6,302 students enrolled in 63 schools.

== See also ==
- List of Mandals in Andhra Pradesh
- Eluru
