= Poduru =

Coordinates: 16°35′24″N 81°45′31″E

Poduru Poduru
- Village and Mandal Head quarters
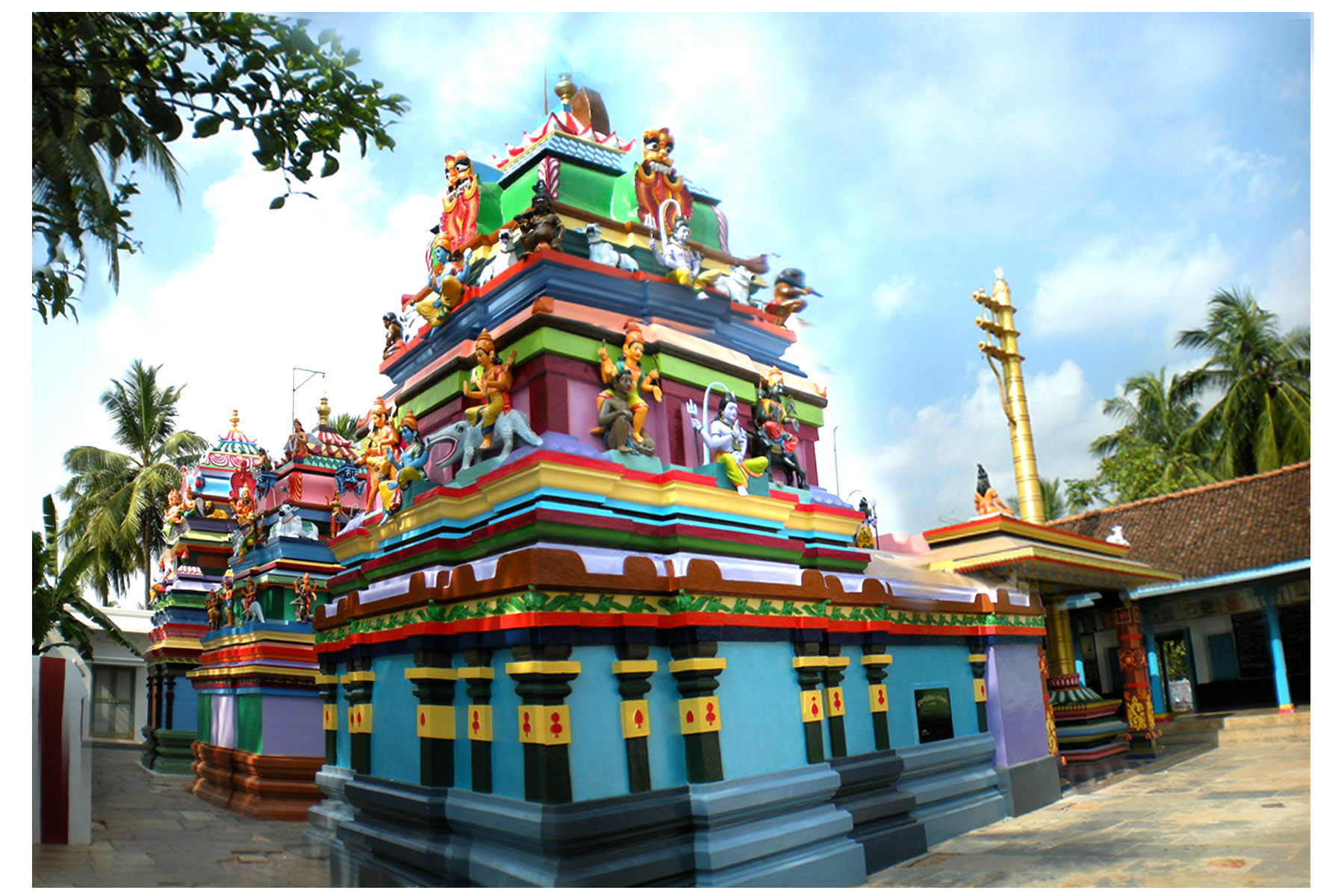
- Poduru: Main temple (Peddagud)
- Interactive map of Poduru
- Country: India
- State: Andhra Pradesh
- District: West Godavari
- Mandal: Poduru

Population (2011)
  - Total: 9,578

Languages
  - Official: Telugu
- Time zone: UTC+5:30 (IST)
- Postal code: 534250 534338
- Nearest city: Palakollu

Poduru is a village and mandal headquarters of Poduru mandal in West Godavari district of the Indian state of Andhra Pradesh. The nearest railway station is located at Palakollu (PKO) at a distance of 7.4 km (4.6 mi).

== Etymology ==
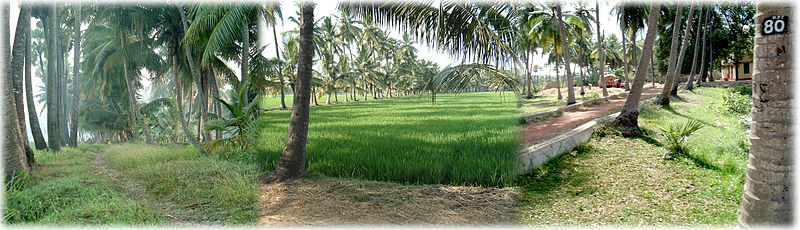
Agriculture in Poduru

In Telugu, "Podu" means Little forest, as it used to be a forest before it was cleared for cultivation.

== Geography ==
Poduru is located on Eastern coastal plains in Coastal Andhra region.

== Demographics ==
As of 2011 Census of India, Poduru had a population of 9578. The total population constitute, 4862 males and 4717 females with a sex ratio of 970 females per 1000 males. 849 children are in the age group of 0–6 years, with sex ratio of 970 The average literacy rate stands at 77.83%.

== Notable people ==
- Abraham L. Pudi, father of American actor Danny Pudi, moved to the U.S. from Poduru
- Dr.Datla Satyanaraya Raju, better known as D. S. Raju M.B.B.S., L.R.C.P., M.R.C.S., M.R.C.P.(London)[2] (born 28 August 1904) was an Indian Parliamentarian. He was born to Datla Ramachandra Raju in Poduru
