= Kalla mandal =

Kalla Mandal
- Mandal
- Interactive map of Kalla Mandal
- Location in Andhra Pradesh, India
- Coordinates: 16.6000°N 81.4667°E
- Country: India
- State: Andhra Pradesh
- District: West Godavari

Government
  - Body: Mandal Parishad

Area
  - Total: 114.32 km^{2} (44.14 sq mi)

Population (2011)
  - Total: 68,118
  - Density: 595.85/km^{2} (1,543.3/sq mi)

Languages
  - Official: Telugu
- Time zone: UTC+5:30 (IST)
- Vehicle registration: AP 37

Kalla mandal is one of the 46 mandals in West Godavari district of the Indian state of Andhra Pradesh. The headquarters are located at Kalla town. Kalla mandal is bordered by Bhimavaram mandal to both north and east, Krishna district to the south, Akividu mandal and Undi mandal to the west.

== Demographics ==
As of 2011 census, Kalla mandal had a population of 68,118 in 19,379 Households. The total population constitute, 34,182 males and 33,936 females with a sex ratio of 993 females per 1000 males. 6,559 children are in the age group of 0–6 years, of which 3,373 are boys and 3,186 are girls with a sex ratio of 945. The average literacy rate stands at 70.20% with 43,217 literates of which 22,309 are males and 20,908 are females.

Majority are Scheduled Castes with a population of 4,233 whereas Schedule Tribes had a population of 594.

=== Work Profile ===
As per the report published by Census India in 2011, 29,698 people were engaged in work activities out of the total population of Kalla mandal which includes 21,544 males and 8,154 females.

According to census survey report 2011, 23,869 workers describe their work as main work, 2,865 as Cultivators, 15,483 persons work as Agricultural labourers. 267 are working in Household industry and 5,254 are involved in other works. Of them 5,829 are Marginal workers.

== Administration ==
Kalla Mandal is administered under Undi (Assembly constituency) of Narsapuram (Lok Sabha constituency) and one of the twelve Mandals that falls under Narasapuram revenue division.

== Towns and villages ==
As of 2011 census, Kalla mandal has 13 settlements, of which all are villages. Bondada is the largest and Prathallameraka is the smallest village in terms of population.

The settlements in Kalla mandal are listed below:

1. Anandhapuram
2. Bondada
3. Bondadapeta
4. Doddanapudi
5. Elurupadu
6. Jakkaram
7. Juvvalapalem
8. LN Puram
9. Kalavapudi
10. Kalla
11. Kallakuru
12. Kolanapalle
13. Kopalle
14. Komatigunta
15. Pedamiram
16. Prathallameraka
17. Seesali
18. Vempadu
19. Malavanithippa
20. SC Bhos colany
21. Pallepalem

== Education ==
Kalla mandal plays a major role in education for the rural students of nearby villages. The primary and secondary school education is imparted by government, aided and private schools, under the School Education Department of the state. As per the school information report for the academic year 2015–16, Kalla mandal has more than 8,518 students enrolled in over 74 schools.

== See also ==
- Eluru
