= Undi mandal =

- Mandal
- Interactive Map Outlining mandal
- Location in Andhra Pradesh, India
- Coordinates: 16.6000°N 81.4667°E
- Country: India
- State: Andhra Pradesh
- District: West Godavari
- Headquarters: Undi

Government
  - Body: Mandal Parishad

Area
  - Total: 129.03 km^{2} (49.82 sq mi)

Population (2011)
  - Total: 66,049
  - Density: 511.89/km^{2} (1,325.8/sq mi)

Languages
  - Official: Telugu
- Time zone: UTC+5:30 (IST)
- Vehicle registration: AP 37

Undi mandal is one of the 19 mandals in West Godavari district of the Indian state of Andhra Pradesh. The headquarters are located in Undi town. The mandal is bordered by Palacoderu mandal to the north, Kalla mandal to the east, Akividu mandal to the south, and Nidamarru to the west.

== Demographics ==
As of 2011 census, the Mandal had a population of 66,049 in 18,731 Households. The total population consists of 33,299 females and 32,750 males with a sex ratio of 1.017 females to 1 male. 6,010 children are in the age group of 0–6 years, of which 3,015 are boys and 2,995 are girls with a sex ratio of 993. The average literacy rate stands at 70.84% with 42,534 literates of which 22,035 are males and 20,499 are females.

The majority of the population are Scheduled Caste (8,644) and Scheduled Tribe (1,181).

=== Work profile ===
As per the 2011 Census, 31,067 people were in the working class. In the 2011 Census, 26,514 of them described their work as manual work, 2,913 as cultivators and 18,201 as agricultural laborers, while an additional 225 workers were in the household industry and 5,175 in other jobs with 4,553 of them being classified as marginal workers.

== Administration ==
Undi mandal is administered under Undi (Assembly constituency) of Narsapuram (Lok Sabha constituency) and one of the twelve mandals that falls under Narasapuram revenue division.

== Towns and villages ==
As of 2011 census, the mandal has 20 settlements, of which all are villages. Undi is the largest and Panduvvakhandrika is the smallest village in terms of population.

The settlements in the mandal are listed below:

1. Aredu
2. Arthamuru
3. Cherukuwada
4. Chilukuru
5. Chinapulluru
6. Kaligotla
7. Kalisipudi
8. Kolamuru
9. Mahadevapatnam
10. Narasimharajapura
11. Pamulaparru
12. Panduvva
13. Panduvvakhandrika
14. Pedapulleru
15. Undi
16. Unudurru
17. Uppuluru
18. Vandrum
19. Velivarru
20. Yendagandi

== Education ==
The mandal plays a major role in education for the rural students of the nearby villages. The primary and secondary school education is imparted by government-aided and private schools, under the School Education Department of the state. As per the school information report for the academic year 2015–16, the mandal has more than 7,157 students enrolled in over 79 schools.

== See also ==
- List of mandals in Andhra Pradesh
