= Madapollam =

Soft, absorbent woven cotton fabric

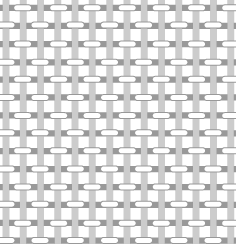
Madapollam's linen weave pattern.

Madapollam /ˌmædəˈpɒləm/ is a soft cotton fabric manufactured from fine yarns with a dense pick laid out in linen weave. Madapollam is used as an embroidery and handkerchief fabric and as a base for fabric printing. The equal warp and weft mean that the tensile strength and shrinkage is the same in any two directions at right angles and that the fabric absorbs liquids such as ink, paint and aircraft dope equally along its X and Y axes.

It was used as the covering for the de Havilland Mosquito a pioneer of wooden monocoque airframe construction in military aircraft, as well as in other aircraft, where it was tautened and stiffened with aircraft dope.

The cloth takes its name from the eponymous village near Narsapur, West Godavari, Andhra Pradesh, India, where the East India Company had a cloth factory.

== See also ==
- Weaving
