= Palakollu mandal =

Palakollu
- Mandal
- Interactive Map Outlining mandal
- Location in Andhra Pradesh, India
- Coordinates: 16.5333°N 81.7333°E
- Country: India
- State: Andhra Pradesh
- District: West Godavari
- Headquarters: Palakollu

Government
  - Body: Mandal Parishad

Area
  - Total: 67.52 km^{2} (26.07 sq mi)
- Elevation: 14 m (46 ft)

Population (2018)
  - Total: 258,625
  - Density: 3,830/km^{2} (9,921/sq mi)

Languages
  - Official: Telugu
- Time zone: UTC+5:30 (IST)
- Vehicle registration: AP 37, AP 38

Palakollu mandal is one of the 46 mandals in the West Godavari district of the Indian state of Andhra Pradesh. The headquarters is located at Palakollu City. The mandal is bordered by Yelamanchili mandal in the north, Narasapuram mandal in the east, Poduru mandal in the south and Veeravasaram mandal in the west.

== Demographics ==
As of the 2011 census, the mandal has a population of 258,625 in 48,377 households. The total population consists of 125,535 men and 5,872 women with a sex ratio of 1,010 women per 1000 men. 12,044 children are in the age group of 0–6 years, of which 6,172 are boys and 6,064 are girls with a sex ratio of 951 girls per 1000 boys. The average literacy rate stands at 82.99% with 97,653 literates, of which 50,723 are men and 46,930 are women.

The majority of the population is identified as Scheduled Caste with a population of 27,110, whereas those identified as Scheduled Tribe number 1,218.

=== Work Profile ===
As per the report published by Census India in 2018, 154,149 people are engaged in work activities out of a total population of 258,625. 98,647 workers describe their work as main work, 2,389 as cultivators, 20,355 as agricultural labourers, 2,371 in the household industry and 23,532 involved in other works. Of these, 5,502 are marginal workers.

== Administration ==
Palakollu mandal is administered under Palakollu (Assembly constituency) of Narsapuram (Lok Sabha constituency) and is one of the twelve mandals that fall under the Narasapuram revenue division.

== City and villages ==
As of the 2011 census, the mandal has 20 settlements, Witch is Includes 1 City 3 out growths and 17 villages. In Palakollu Mandal. Palakollu Rural, Poolapalli, and Ullamparru Full OG's to Palakollu (M). Palakollu Rural is the largest and Chandaparru is the smallest village in terms of population.

The settlements in the mandal are listed below:

1. Agarru
2. Aratlakatla
3. Ballipadu
4. Chandaparru
5. Chintaparru
6. Dagguluru
7. Digamarru
8. Gorintada
9. Kapavaram
10. Lankalakoderu
11. Palakollu (M)
12. Palakollu Rural (OG)
13. Palamuru
14. Pedamamidipalle
15. Poolapalli (OG)
16. Sivadevunichikkala
17. Tillapudi
18. Ullamparru (OG)
19. Varidhanam
20. Velivela

Note:

M-Municipality
(OG) denotes an Out Growth

== Education ==
The mandal plays a major role in the education of rural students in the nearby villages. The primary and secondary school education is imparted by the government in aided and private schools, under the School Education Department of the state. As per the school information report for the academic year 2015–16, the mandal has more than 19,727 students enrolled in over 149 schools.

== See also ==
- List of mandals in Andhra Pradesh
- Eluru
