= Veeravasaram =

- Village
- Interactive map of Veeravasaram
- Coordinates: 16°32′16″N 81°37′24″E
- Country: India
- State: Andhra Pradesh
- District: West Godavari
- Talukas: Veeravasaram

Population (2001)
  - Total: 64,142

Languages
  - Official: Telugu
- Time zone: UTC+5:30 (IST)
- PIN: 534245
- Telephone code: 08816
- Vehicle registration: AP

Veeravasaram is a village in West Godavari district of the Indian state of Andhra Pradesh.

== Demographics ==
According to Indian census, 2001, the demographic details of Veeravasaram mandal is as follows:

- Total Population: 64,142 in 16,237 Households
- Male Population: 32,302 and Female Population: 31,840
- Children Under 6-years of age: 7,602 (Boys - 3,858 and Girls – 3,744)
- Total Literates: 46,673

Population Table
Gender	Population
Male	32,302
Female	31,840
