= Poduru mandal =

- Mandal
- Interactive Map Outlining mandal
- Location in Andhra Pradesh, India
- Coordinates: 16°35′24″N 81°45′31″E
- Country: India
- State: Andhra Pradesh
- District: West Godavari
- Headquarters: Poduru

Government
  - Body: Mandal Parishad

Area
  - Total: 68.60 km^{2} (26.49 sq mi)
- Elevation: 14 m (46 ft)

Population (2011)
  - Total: 65,706
  - Density: 957.8/km^{2} (2,481/sq mi)

Languages
  - Official: Telugu
- Time zone: UTC+5:30 (IST)
- Vehicle registration: AP 37
- Nearest city: Palakollu

Poduru mandal is one of 46 mandals in West Godavari district of the Indian state of Andhra Pradesh. The headquarters is located in the town of Poduru.

== Demographics ==
As of the 2011 census, the mandal had a population of 65,706 in 18,294 households. The population consists of 33,128 males and 32,578 females, with a sex ratio of 983 females per 1000 males. 6,106 children are in the age group of 0–6 years, of which 3,154 are boys and 2,952 are girls, with a sex ratio of 936. The average literacy rate stands at 80.02% with 47,689 literates of which 25,218 are males and 22,471 are females.

The majority are Schedule Castes with a population of 17,675 whereas Schedule Tribe had a population of 485.

== Economy ==
Per a report published by Census India in 2011, 31,077 people are employed: 20,643 males and 10,434 females. According to this report, 23,637 workers describe their work as main work, 1,794 as cultivators, 16,326 as agricultural labourers, 604 working in household industry and 4,913 involved in other work, out of them 7,440 are marginal workers.

== Administration ==
Poduru mandal is administered under Achanta palakollu (Assembly constituency) of Narsapuram (Lok Sabha constituency) and one of the twelve mandals that fall under Narasapuram revenue division.

== Geography ==
The mandal is bordered by Achanta mandal to the north, Yelamanchili mandal to the east, Palacole mandal to the south and Penumantra mandal to the west.

As of 2011 census, the mandal had 14 settlements, all villages. Poduru is the largest and Miniminchilipadu is the smallest by population.

The settlements in the mandal are:

- 1Gummaluru
- 2Jagannadhapuram
- 3Jinnuru
- 4Kavitam
- 5Kommuchikkala
- 6Mattaparru
- 7Miniminchilipadu
- 8Pandithavilluru
- 9Pemmarajupolavaram
- 10Penumadam
- 11Poduru
- 12Ravipadu
- 13Vaddiparru
- 14Vedangi
- 15appannacheruvu
- 16thoorpupalem

== Education ==
The mandal plays a major role in education for the rural students from nearby villages. The primary and secondary school education is imparted by government, aid from external sources, and private schools, supervised by the School Education Department. As per the school information report for the academic year 2015–16, the mandal had more than 6,244 students enrolled in over 84 schools.

== See also ==
- List of mandals in Andhra Pradesh
- Eluru
