= Penugonda mandal =

- Mandal
- Interactive Map Outlining mandal
- Location in Andhra Pradesh, India
- Coordinates: 16.480°N 81.781°E
- Country: India
- State: Andhra Pradesh
- District: West Godavari
- Headquarters: Vasavi Penugonda

Government
  - Body: Mandal Parishad

Area
  - Total: 71.01 km^{2} (27.42 sq mi)
- Elevation: 14 m (46 ft)

Population (2011)
  - Total: 69,317
  - Density: 976.2/km^{2} (2,528/sq mi)

Languages
  - Official: Telugu
- Time zone: UTC+5:30 (IST)
- Vehicle registration: AP 37

Penugonda mandal is one of the 46 mandals in West Godavari district of the Indian state of Andhra Pradesh. The headquarters are located at Vasavi Penugonda town. The mandal is bordered by Godavari River to north, Achanta mandal to the east, Penumantra mandal and Iragavaram mandal to the south and Peravali mandal to the west.

== Demographics ==
As of 2011 census, the mandal had a population of 69,317 in 19,124 Households. The total population constitute, 34,837 males and 34,480 females with a sex ratio of 970 females per 1000 males. 6,535 children are in the age group of 0–6 years, of which 3,334 are boys and 3,201 are girls with a sex ratio of 960. The average literacy rate stands at 77.67% with 48,763 literates of which 25,728 are males and 23,035 are females.

Majority are Schedule Caste with a population of 14,423 whereas Schedule Tribe had a population of 570.

=== Work Profile ===
As per the report published by Census India in 2011, 31,975 people were engaged in work activities out of the total population of Penugonda mandal which includes 21,847 males and 10,128 females.

According to census survey report 2011, 27,027 workers describe their work as main work, 2,238 as Cultivators, 18,373 person work as Agricultural labourers. 429 are working in Household industry and 5,987 are involved in other works. Of them 4,948 are Marginal workers.

== Administration ==
Penugonda mandal is administered under Achanta (Assembly constituency) of Narsapuram (Lok Sabha constituency) and one of the twelve mandals that falls under Narasapuram revenue division.

== Towns and villages ==
As of 2011 census, the mandal has 14 settlements, of which all are villages. Vasavi Penugonda is the largest and munamarru is the smallest village in terms of population.

The settlements in the mandal are listed below:

1. Cherukuwada
2. Chinamallam
3. Deva
4. Ilaparru
5. Kothalaparru
6. Mulaparru
7. Munamarru
8. Nadipudi
9. Vasavi Penugonda
10. Ramannapalem
11. Sidhantham
12. Tamarada
13. Vadali
14. Venkatramapuram

== Education ==
The mandal plays a major role in education for the rural students of the nearby villages. The primary and secondary school education is imparted by government, aided and private schools, under the School Education Department of the state. As per the school information report for the academic year 2015–16, the mandal has more than 9,501 students enrolled in over 90 schools.

== See also ==
- List of mandals in Andhra Pradesh
- Eluru
