= Penumantra =

Coordinates: 16°38′39″N 81°38′54″E

- Village
- Interactive map of Penumantra
- Location in Andhra Pradesh, India
- Country: India
- State: Andhra Pradesh
- District: West Godavari
- Mandal: Penumantra

Population (2011)
  - Total: 10,658

Languages
  - Official: Telugu
- Time zone: UTC+5:30 (IST)
- Postal code: 534124
- Vehicle registration: AP

Penumantra is a village in West Godavari district of the Indian state of Andhra Pradesh. The village is the site of the headquarters of Penumantra Mandal.

== Demographics ==
As of 2011 Census of India, Penumantra had a population of 10658. The total population constitute, 5247 males and 5411 females with a sex ratio of 1031 females per 1000 males. 960 children are in the age group of 0–6 years, with sex ratio of 1000 The average literacy rate stands at 78.13%.
