= Narasapuram Mandal =

Narasapuram mandal
- Mandal
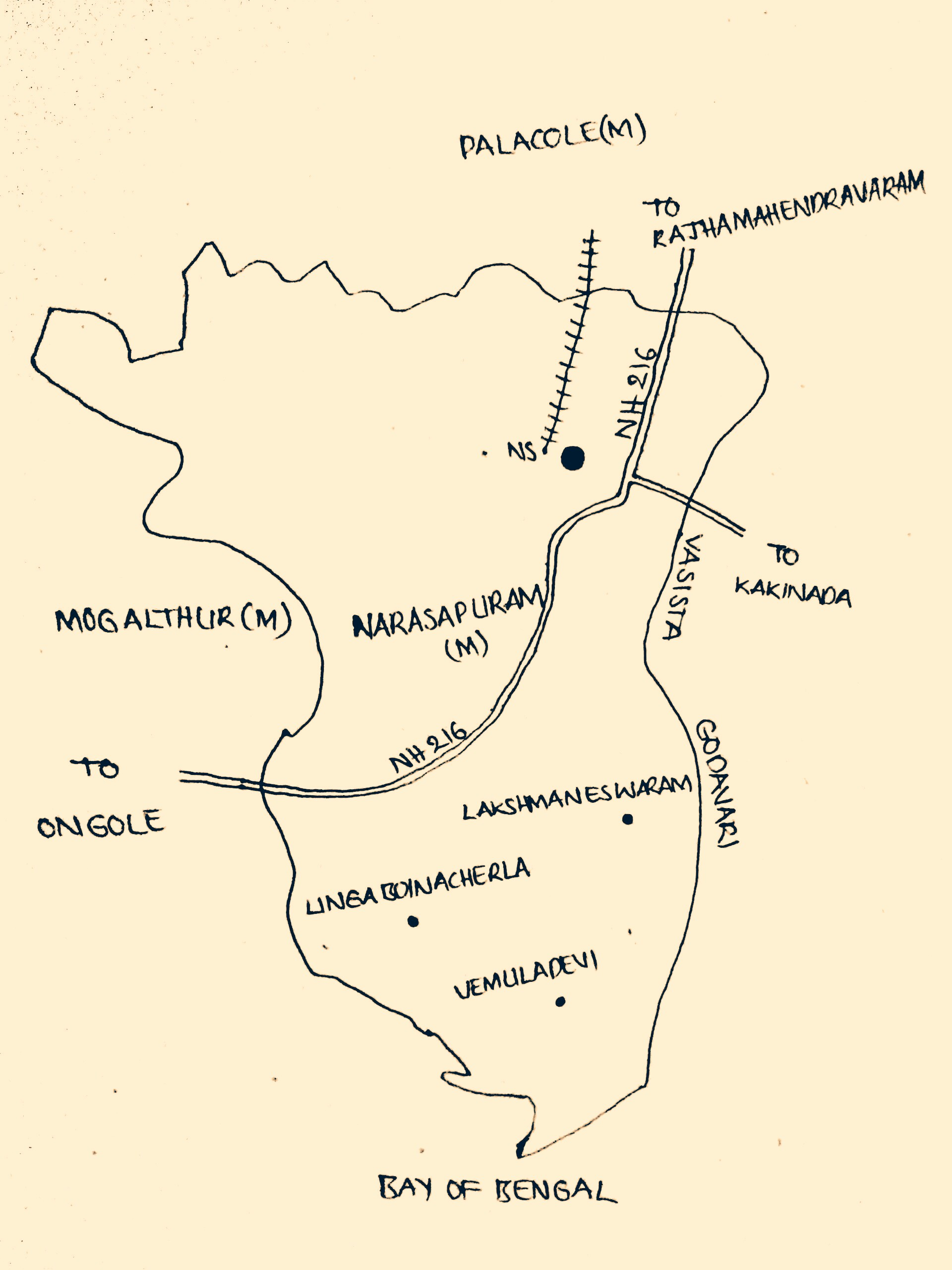
- Narasapuram Municipality map
- Interactive map of Narasapuram mandal
- Location in Andhra Pradesh, India
- Coordinates: 16.4361°N 81.7016°E
- Country: India
- State: Andhra Pradesh
- District: West Godavari
- Headquarters: Narasapuram

Government
  - Body: Mandal Parishad

Area
  - Total: 153.65 km^{2} (59.32 sq mi)
- Elevation: 15 m (49 ft)

Population (2011)
  - Total: 138,741
  - Density: 902.97/km^{2} (2,338.7/sq mi)

Languages
  - Official: Telugu
- Time zone: UTC+5:30 (IST)
- Vehicle registration: AP 37

Narasapuram Mandal is one of the 19 mandals in the West Godavari district of the Indian state of Andhra Pradesh. Its headquarters are in Narasapuram, a town in the mandal. The mandal is bordered by the Godavari River to the north, the Bay of Bengal to the east, the Mogalthur mandal to the south, and the Palacole mandal to the west.

== Demographics ==
As of the 2011 census, the mandal has a population of 138,741, in 21,606 households. There are 69,405 males and 69,336 females, for a ratio of 999 females per 1000 males. There are 12,605 children aged 6 years and under, of which 6,541 are boys, and 6,064 are girls, for a sex ratio of 927 to 1000. The average literacy rate is 78.83%, with 99,438 literate persons, of which 52,094 are males and 47,344 are females.

The majority are Schedule Castes with a population of 23,507, whereas Schedule Tribes have a population of 1,480.

=== Work profile ===
As of 2011, 59,306 people were engaged in work activities. According to the 2011 census, 46,296 workers work in main work (defined as "employment or earning more than 6 months" which is compared to marginal, or seasonal work), 3,860 work as cultivators, 18,797 work as agricultural labourers, 707 work in the household industry and 22,932 are involved in other jobs. Of these, 13,010 are marginal workers.

== Administration ==
Narasapuram mandal is administered under the Narasapuram assembly constituency of the Narsapuram (Lok Sabha constituency) and is one of the 12 mandals that falls under the Narasapuram revenue division.

== Towns and villages ==
As of the 2011 census, the mandal has 16 settlements, all of which are villages. Narasapuram is the largest and Chinamamidipalle is the smallest village by population.

The settlements in the mandal are as follows.

1. Chittavaram
2. Gondi
3. Kamsalibethapudi
4. Kopparru
5. Lakshmaneswaram
6. Likhithapudi
7. Lingaboina charla
8. Mallavaram
9. Navarasapuram
10. Rustumbada
11. Saripalle
12. Seetharamapuram
13. Thurputallu
14. Vemuladeevi

Note: M-Municipality

== Education ==
The mandal plays a major role in education for the rural students of the nearby villages. Primary and secondary school education is imparted by government and private schools, under the School Education Department of the state. For the academic year 2015–16, the mandal had more than 19,585 students enrolled in over 169 schools.

== See also ==
- List of mandals in Andhra Pradesh
- Eluru
