= Iragavaram =

Coordinates: 16°40′47″N 81°42′34″E

- Village
- Interactive map of Iragavaram
- Country: India
- State: Andhra Pradesh
- District: West Godavari
- Talukas: Iragavaram

Languages
  - Official: Telugu
- Time zone: UTC+5:30 (IST)
- Vehicle registration: AP

Iraga-varam is a village in the West Godavari district of the Indian state of Andhra Pradesh. It is located in Iragavaram mandal in Narsapuram revenue division. The nearest railway station is Velpuru (VPU) located at a distance of 7 km.

== Demographics ==
As of 2011 Census of India, Iragavaram had a population of 9568. The total population constitute, 4912 males and 4656 females with a sex ratio of 948 females per 1000 males. 904 children are in the age group of 0–6 years, with sex ratio of 940. The average literacy rate stands at 77.97%.
