= Pekeru =

- Village
- Interactive map of Pekeru
- Location in Andhra Pradesh, India
- Coordinates: 16.6882°N 81.7459°E
- Country: India
- State: Andhra Pradesh
- District: West Godavari

Government
  - Type: Panchayat

Languages
  - Official: Telugu
- Time zone: UTC+5:30 (IST)
- PIN: 534320
- Telephone code: +91–08819
- Vehicle registration: AP-39 (formerly AP-37)
- Nearest town: Tanuku

Pekeru is a census town in West Godavari district, Andhra Pradesh, India. It is located west of the Godavari River beside Eletipadu and Ayithampudi.

== Demographics ==
As of the 2011 Census of India, it had a population of 4,436 across 1,270 households. Historically, Pekeru's main industry is agriculture, small business, rice mills and educational institutions. It is part of Tanuku Assembly constituency and Narasapuram Lok Sabha constituency. It also shares border with East Godavari District.

== Community development ==
Kunuku Hemakumari, the sarpanch of Pekeru in West Godavari district, Andhra Pradesh, was nominated by the Ministry of Panchayati Raj (MoPR) to participate in a side event at the 57th Commission on Population and Development (CPD) of the United Nations Economic and Social Council (ECOSOC). The event took place in New York, USA, on May 3, 2024.

Hemakumari works to promote self-reliance among women in the fields of health and education by organizing regular medical camps and health awareness sessions. She also collaborates closely with local families to boost the enrollment of girls in schools. “Empowerment lies in fostering self-reliance and confidence, encouraging informed decisions about health, education, and livelihoods,” she emphasizes.
