= Relangi, Alluri Sitharama Raju district =

Village in Andhra Pradesh, India

Relangi is a village in the Chintapalle area of Alluri Sitharama Raju district, in the Indian state of Andhra Pradesh. The village had a population of 118 as of the 2011 census.

The village is administrated by an elected sarpanch (head of village), as mandated by the Gram panchayat laws in the constitution of India.
