= Utada =

Utada (written: 宇多田) is a Japanese surname. Notable people with the surname include:

- Hikaru Utada, singer-songwriter who has also gone by the stage names of "Cubic U" and simply "Utada".
- Teruzane Utada (born 1948), a record producer, father of Hikaru Utada.
- Junko Utada (1951–2013), singer and actress, mother of Hikaru Utada, who has gone by the stage name of "Keiko Fuji".

Fictional characters:

- Susumu and Tsuyoshi Utada, from the anime Machine Robo Rescue
