= Undi =

- Village
- Interactive map of Undi
- Location in Andhra Pradesh, India
- Coordinates: 16.6000°N 81.4667°E
- Country: India
- State: Andhra Pradesh
- District: West Godavari

Government
  - MLA: Raghu Rama Krishnam Raju
- Elevation: 2 m (6.6 ft)

Population (2024)
  - Total: 200,000

Languages
  - Official: Telugu
- Time zone: UTC+5:30 (IST)
- PIN: 534199
- Vehicle registration: AP37
- Nearest city: Bhimavaram
- Lok Sabha constituency: Narsapuram
- Vidhan Sabha constituency: Undi
- Climate: hot (Köppen)

Undi is a village in West Godavari district of the Indian state of Andhra Pradesh.

It is located about 39 kilometers from Eluru town. Its old name is "Dundipuram".

== Geography ==
Undi is located at 16.6000°N 81.4667°E. It has an average elevation of 2 meters (9 feet).

== Demographics ==
According to census-2011, Undi has:

Number of households: 5,000
Total Population: 1,00,000
Male Population: 1,20,000
Female population: 7,711
