= Narasapuram revenue division =

Coordinates: 16.7°N 81.1°E

- revenue division in West Godavari district
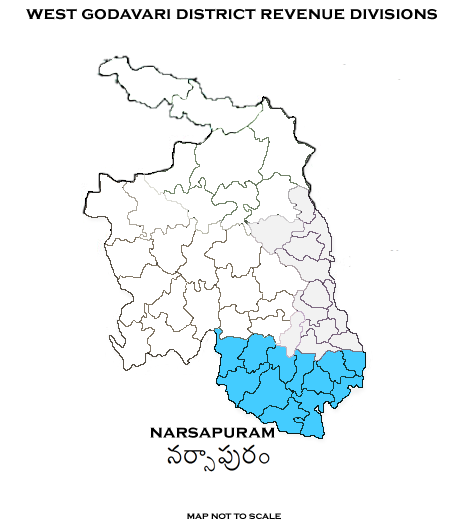
- Narasapuram revenue division in West Godavari district
- Country: India
- State: Andhra Pradesh
- District: West Godavari

Narasapuram revenue division (or Narasapuram division) is an administrative division in the West Godavari district of the Indian state of Andhra Pradesh. It is one of the 3 revenue divisions in the district which consists of 10 mandals under its administration. Narasapuram is the divisional headquarters of the division.

== Administration ==
Erstwhile mandals in the division are:

No.	Mandals	Municipalities
1	Narasapuram Mandal	Bhimavaram
2	Mogalthur mandal	Narasapuram
3	Palakollu Mandal	Palakollu
4	Poduru mandal	
5	Yelamanchili mandal	
6	Achanta mandal	
7	Penugonda mandal	
8	Penumantra mandal	
9	Tanuku mandal	
10	Iragavaram mandal	

New(present day) mandals in the division are:

No.	Mandals	Municipalities
1	Narasapuram Mandal	Narasapuram
2	Mogalthur mandal	
3	Palakollu Mandal	Palakollu
4	Poduru mandal	
5	Yelamanchili mandal	
6	Achanta mandal	
7	Penugonda mandal	
8	Penumantra mandal	

== See also ==
- List of revenue divisions in Andhra Pradesh
- List of mandals in Andhra Pradesh
