= Narasapuram =

Narasapuram Narasapur
- Town
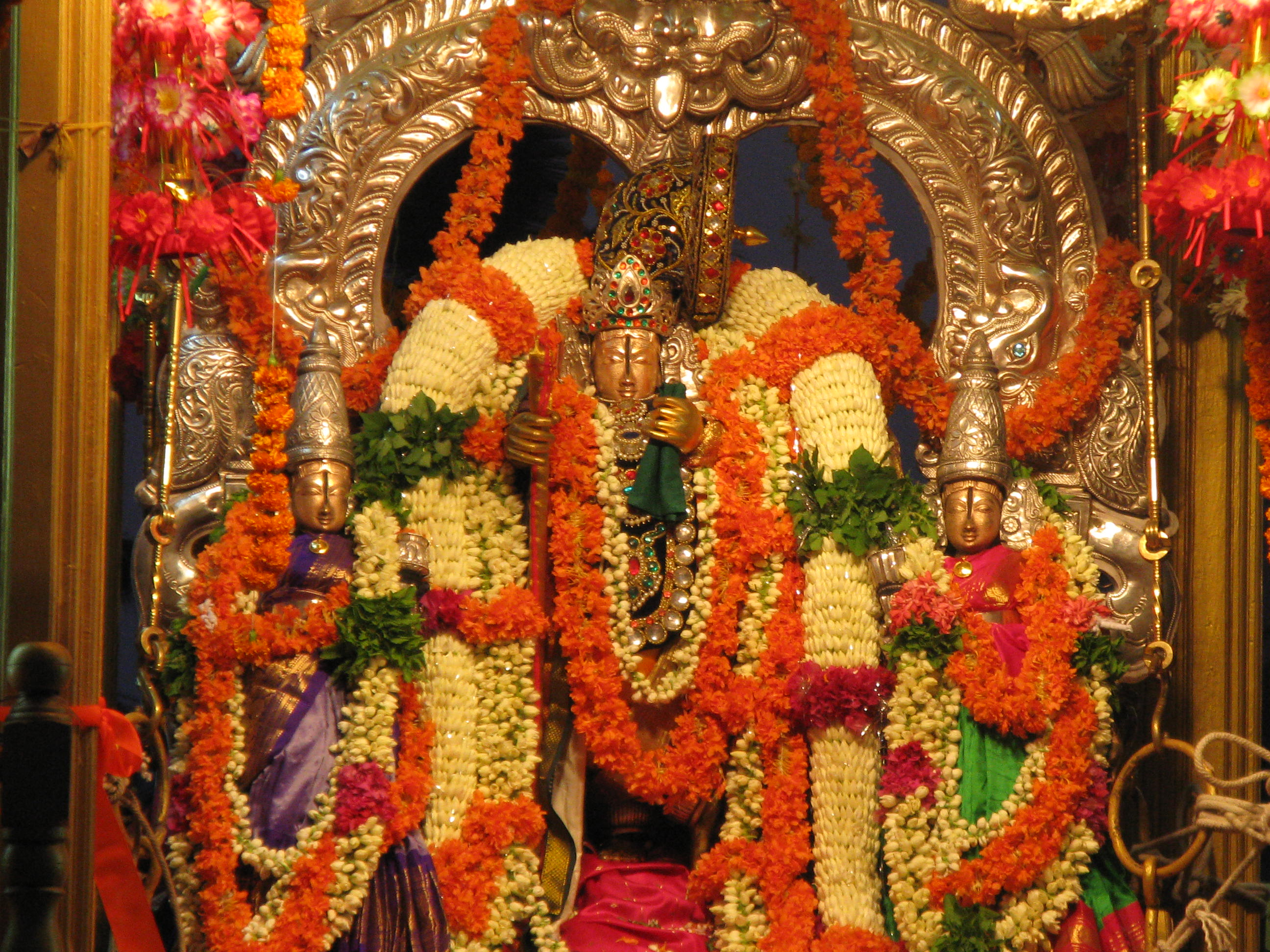
- Narasapuram Adikesava Embarmannar Swamy

- Location in Andhra Pradesh, India Location in India
- Coordinates: 16.4361°N 81.7016°E
- Country: India
- State: Andhra Pradesh
- District: West Godavari
- Revenue division: Narasapuram
- Mandal: Narasapuram
- Named for: Narasimha

Government
  - Type: Municipal council
  - Body: Narasapuram Municipality
  - Municipal Commissioner: C. Srinivas
  - MLA: Bommidi Narayana Nayakar
  - MP(Loksabha): Bhupathiraju Srinivasa Varma

Area
  - Total: 11.32 km^{2} (4.37 sq mi)
- Elevation: 2 m (6.6 ft)

Population (2011)
  - Total: 58,770
  - Density: 5,192/km^{2} (13,450/sq mi)

Languages
  - Official: Telugu
- Time zone: UTC+5:30 (IST)
- PIN: 534275
- Telephone code: 08814
- Vehicle registration: AP-37
- Nearest town: Palakollu

Narasapuram is a town in West Godavari district of the Indian state of Andhra Pradesh. It is a municipality and mandal headquarters of Narasapuram Mandal in Narasapuram revenue division. The city is situated on the banks of the Vasista Godavari River. The lace industry is prevalent in the city and its surroundings.

== Etymology ==
Narsapur was also known as "Nrusimhapuri", named after the Lord Narasimha. Gradually it changed into Narasimhapuram and now to Narasapuram. It is also known as Abhinavabhutapuri.

== History ==
The existence of Narsapur originates back to 1173 AD. Dutch people arrived in Narsapur in 1626. Narsapur was used as a port by the Dutch and ships and boats were built here. It was noted for its ship building activity and some of the Europeans also were customers at this place; small boats are still built in Narsapur. In the 16th century, Portuguese established their own factory which remained as a trading centre for a few years. In the 18th century, Narsapur became an important trading port. From this port, teak was exported to other regions. The ports at Kakinada and Narsapuram became famous for manufacturing ships. At present there is no port handling at Narsapur.

Madhavayapalem (Madapollam) is celebrated as one of the earliest places where the English established a factory and was famous for its trade in cloth. According to Alexander Hamilton's A New Account of the East Indies (1727):

"Next to Matchulipatam (Machilipatnam) is Narsipore, where the English had a Factory for long Cloth, for the Use of their Factory of Matchulipatam, when they manufactured Chintz there. It also affords good Teak Timber for building, and has a fine deep River, but a dangerous Bar, which makes it little frequented."

The trade of the town has steadily declined since the abolition of the company's factory in 1827. Before independence, British civilians had made imports and exports from Narsapur.

== Geography ==
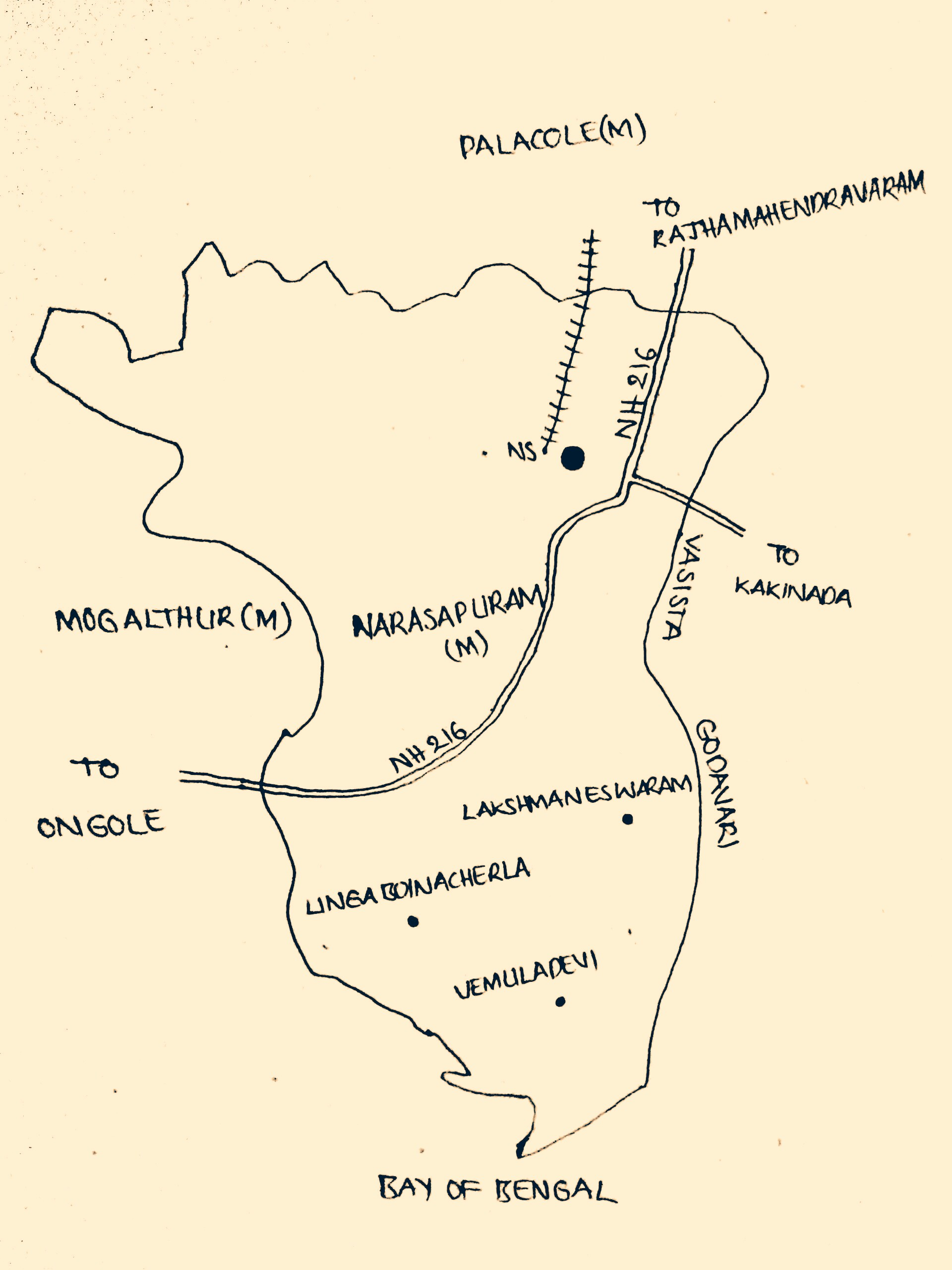
Narasapuram municipality in Narasapuram mandal map

Narsapur is located at 16.4361°N 81.7016°E and on the right bank of Vasista Godavari River at an altitude of 0 m (0 ft). The River Godavari empties into Bay of Bengal near Antarvedi, at 9.6 km from Narsapur.

== Climate ==
Climate data for Narasapuram (1991–2020)
Month	Jan	Feb	Mar	Apr	May	Jun	Jul	Aug	Sep	Oct	Nov	Dec	Year
Record high °C (°F)	33.3 (91.9)	37.2 (99.0)	37.0 (98.6)	39.3 (102.7)	46.1 (115.0)	44.6 (112.3)	38.9 (102.0)	37.6 (99.7)	35.6 (96.1)	36.2 (97.2)	34.4 (93.9)	33.4 (92.1)	46.1 (115.0)
Mean daily maximum °C (°F)	29.1 (84.4)	30.8 (87.4)	32.8 (91.0)	34.2 (93.6)	36.4 (97.5)	35.1 (95.2)	32.6 (90.7)	31.9 (89.4)	31.9 (89.4)	31.2 (88.2)	30.2 (86.4)	29.2 (84.6)	32.1 (89.8)
Mean daily minimum °C (°F)	20.0 (68.0)	21.2 (70.2)	23.7 (74.7)	26.3 (79.3)	28.2 (82.8)	27.6 (81.7)	26.4 (79.5)	26.1 (79.0)	26.2 (79.2)	24.9 (76.8)	22.3 (72.1)	20.1 (68.2)	24.4 (75.9)
Record low °C (°F)	13.5 (56.3)	14.6 (58.3)	18.9 (66.0)	20.0 (68.0)	21.2 (70.2)	20.5 (68.9)	21.6 (70.9)	22.2 (72.0)	21.5 (70.7)	20.5 (68.9)	15.6 (60.1)	15.5 (59.9)	13.5 (56.3)
Average rainfall mm (inches)	8.6 (0.34)	6.4 (0.25)	5.2 (0.20)	11.3 (0.44)	53.3 (2.10)	131.3 (5.17)	203.0 (7.99)	199.7 (7.86)	193.7 (7.63)	245.7 (9.67)	91.2 (3.59)	19.7 (0.78)	1,169 (46.02)
Average rainy days	0.6	0.4	0.2	1.2	1.9	6.7	10.9	11.2	9.3	10.7	3.8	0.8	57.6
Average relative humidity (%) (at 17:30 IST)	66	64	67	68	65	67	72	74	77	79	73	67	70
Source: India Meteorological Department

== Demographics ==
As of 2011 census, the city had a population of 58,770. The total population is constituted of 28,796 males and 29,974 females – a sex ratio of 961 females per 1000 males, higher than the national average of 940 per 1000. 29,974 children are in the age group of 0–6 years, of which 2,665 are boys and 2,456 are girls. The average literacy rate stands at 86.24% with 46,266 literates, significantly higher than the district average of 73.00%.

== Governance ==
=== Civic administration ===
Narasapuram Municipality was constituted in 1956. Narsapur was made a 3rd Grade Municipality in 1956. It was upgraded to 2nd Grade Municipality in 1965 and again upgraded to 1st Grade Municipality in 2001. Narsapur Municipality consists of 31 wards and 48 slums in an area of 11.52 km^{2}.

=== Politics ===
Narasapuram is represented by Narasapuram (Assembly constituency) for Andhra Pradesh Legislative Assembly. Under Narasapuram mandal, the town falls in Narasapuram (Lok Sabha constituency). Bommidi Narayana nayakar is the present MLA of the constituency from Janasena Party and the present MP is Srinivas Varma from BJP.

== Economy ==
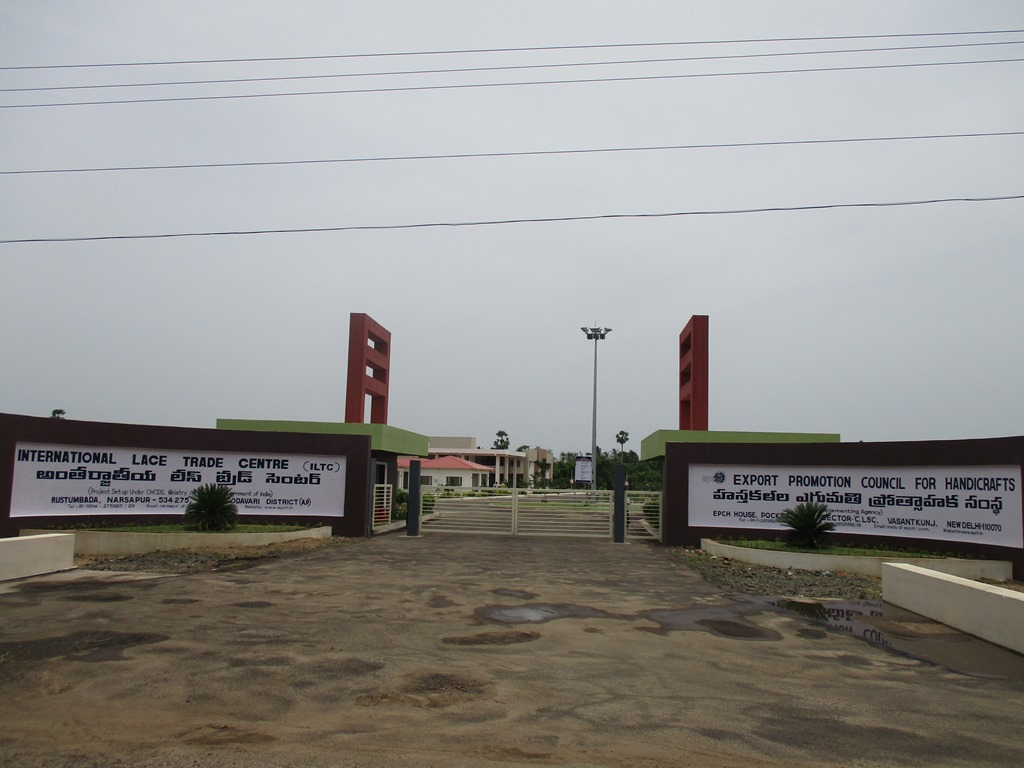

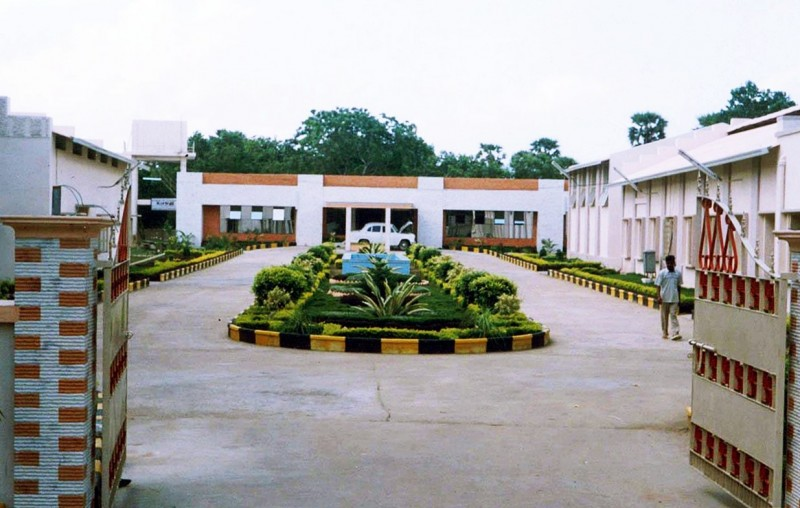

Industries

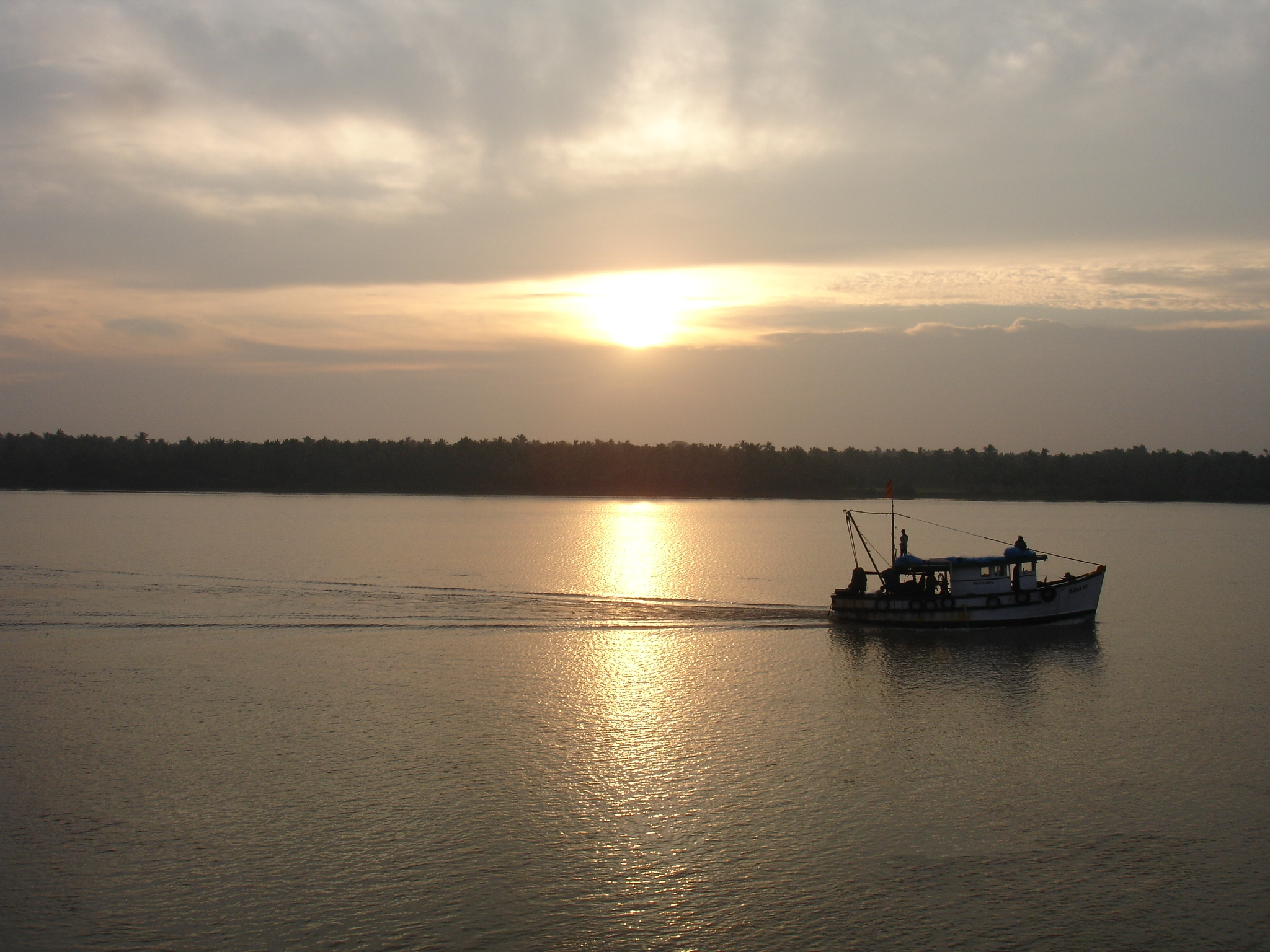
FishBoat

Handmade crochet lace-work is one of the most common form of industry in the town.

There are many industries in and around the town such as International Lace Trade Centre, Oil and Natural Gas Corporation of India, Central Industrial Security Force, Central Marine Fisheries Research Institute, PanGodavari (Handicrafts), Comprehensive Handicrafts Cluster Development Scheme, AWS (Automatic Weather Station) installed and commissioned by IMD.

Aquaculture

Fishery is one of the main occupations that generates good amounts of revenues for the fishermen. It involves cultivation of a variety of estuarine fish called Pulasa.

== Culture ==
Godavari Pushkaram is held every twelve years in Narasapuram with a holy dip in the Vasista Godavari River. This river is said to have been brought to earth by the Maharishi Vashishtha, one of the seven great sages of the Hindu mythology. The place draws people from the world over throughout the year. Antarvedi, the merging of the Bay of Bengal and Vasista River (which is a tributary of the River Godavari) is about 10 kms away. The place of confluence of the ocean and river is called the "Sapta Sagara Sangam Pradesam". It is also known as the Anna Chelli Gattu (meaning brother–sister embankment).

Some of the religious sites in the town are Adikesava Emberumaanar Temple, a Vaishnavite temple 300 years old which was constructed by translator of the British East India Company, Prasannagresara Puppala Ramanappa Naidu.

== Landmarks ==
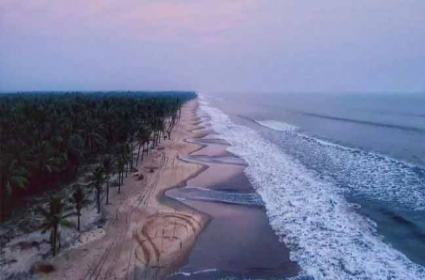
Perupalem Beach

The Perupalem Beach is located at a distance of 20 km from the town. Narasapuram has become a key landmark destination for foreigners due to monkey tourism.

== Education ==
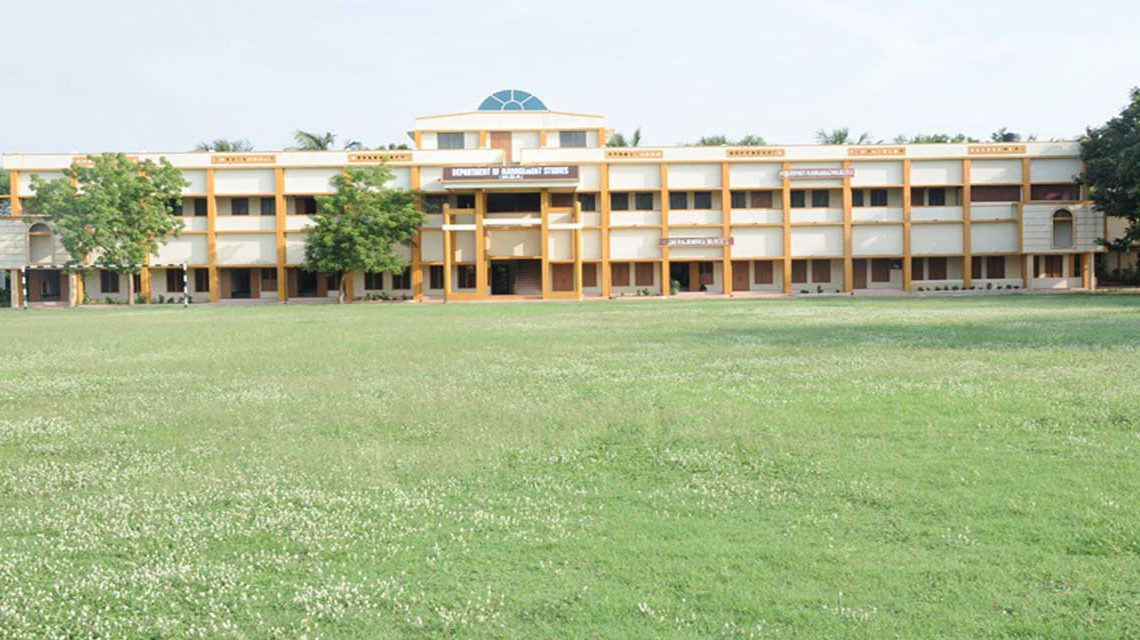
Sri YN College

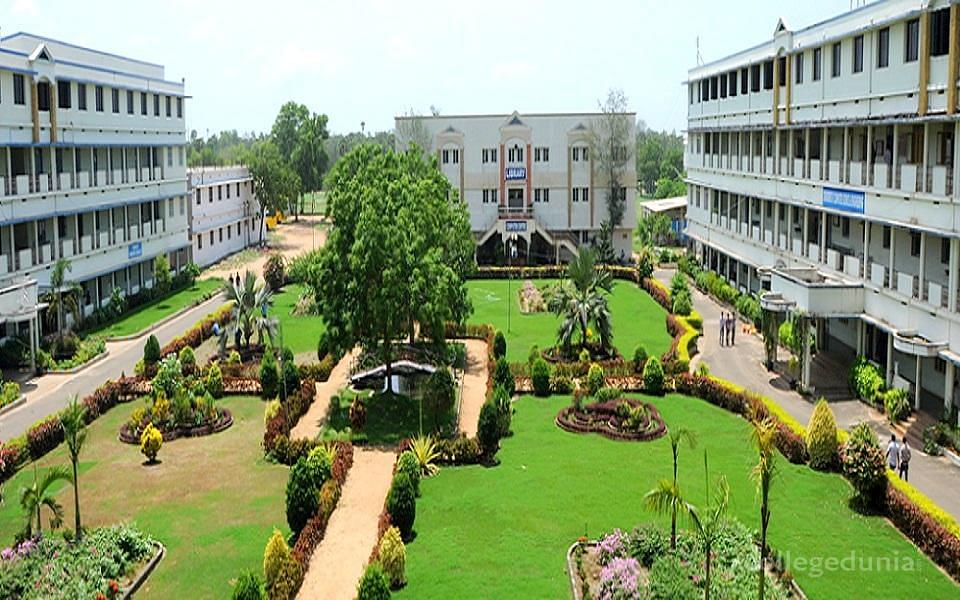
Swarnandra Engineering College

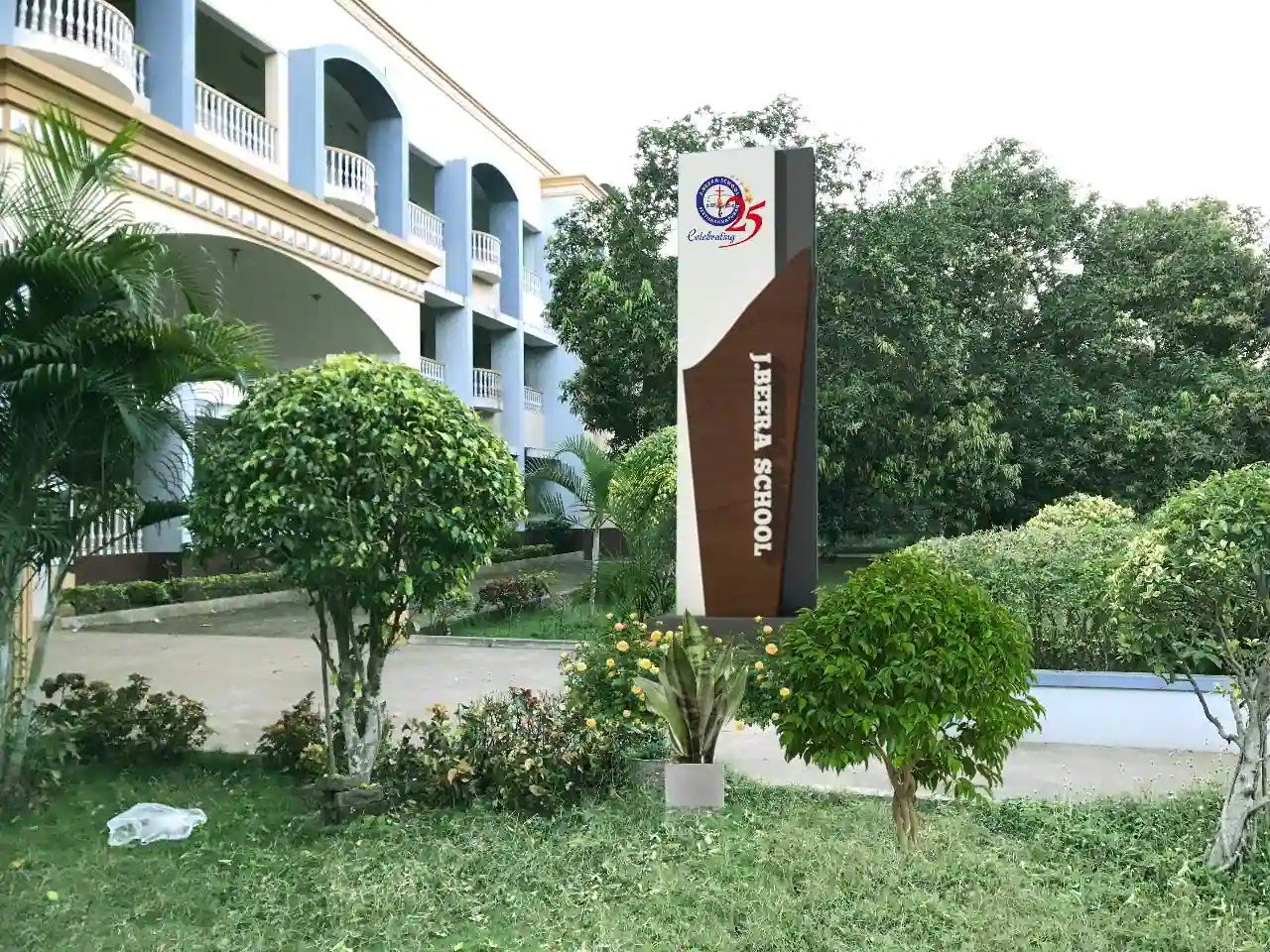

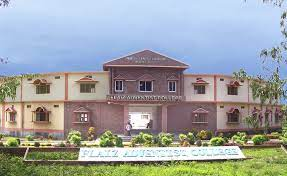

The primary and secondary school education is imparted by government, aided and private schools, under the School Education Department of the state. The mediums of instruction followed by different schools are English and Telugu.

Taylor High School is one of the major landmarks in Narsapuram showcasing the Dutch and the British buildings. The high school was founded by British Educationist and local Revenue Officer H. Taylor in 1852, and was later named after him. The 'manyam veerudu' (jungle hero) Alluri Sitarama Raju had his schooling in this institution before he led the Rampa rebellion against the British. Chilakamarti Lakshmi Narasimham, a freedom fighter and a noted Telugu litterateur also attended the school.

Swarnandhra College of Engineering and Technology, an affiliation to Jawaharlal Nehru Technological University of Kakinada, Sri Yerramilli Narayanamurthy college which was established in 1949, J Beera School of Education, BGBS Women's and music college, Flaiz Adventist Degree college and Some Corporate colleges are some of the other professional colleges.

== Transport ==
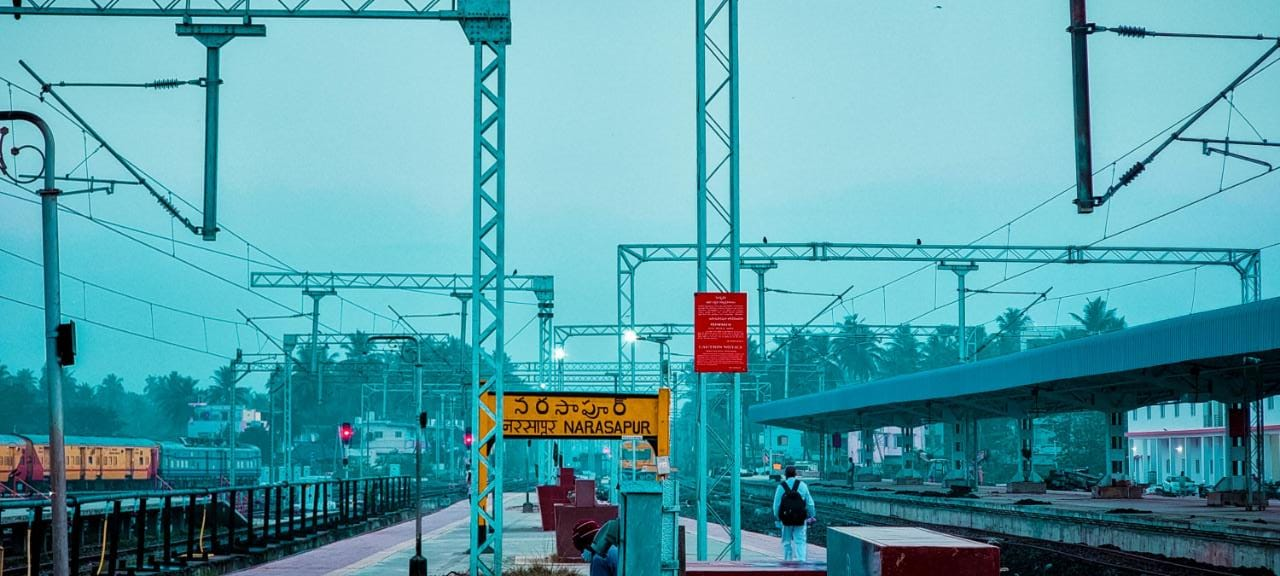
Narsapur Railway Station

=== Roadways ===
The town has a total road length of 79.67 km (49.50 mi). The Andhra Pradesh State Road Transport Corporation operates bus services from Narasapuram bus station. NH216 connects NH 16 near Ongole, a short route for Kolkata - Chennai route.

APSRTC operates Bus servies from Narasapuram to Eluru, Rajahmundry, Vijayawada, Visakhapatnam, Nidadavolu, Ramachandrapuram, Mandapeta, Palakollu, Hyderabad, kakinada, Ravulapalem, Machilipatanam, and Kaikaluru.

=== Railways ===
Narasapur railway station is a terminal station located on the Bhimavaram–Narasapur branch line of Bhimavaram -Nidadavolu loop line in South Coast Railway zone.

It is classified as a B–category station in  South Coast Railway zone.[37]Kotipalli-Narsapuram railway line is the important railway project to the town.

=== Waterways ===
Narasapur Port is proposed for developing it as a minor port, fishing harbor and ONGC Jetty.

=== Airways ===
Rajahmundry Airport is the nearest airport - 80 km away from the town.

== Sports ==
Narsapuram Football Club is part of FLOW (Football League Of West Godavari). National level Kabaddi competitions are held every year on the eve of Sankranti festival at Kabadi Stadium, Narsapur. All India level Seniors Tennis Tournament is held in Narsapur officers club every year.

== See also ==
- List of municipalities in Andhra Pradesh
