= Mogalthur mandal =

Coordinates: 16.416°N 81.610°E

- Mandal
- Interactive map of Mogalthur mandal
- Location in Andhra Pradesh, India
- Country: India
- State: Andhra Pradesh
- District: West Godavari
- Headquarters: Mogalthur

Government
  - Body: Mandal Parishad

Population (2011)
  - Total: 72,255

Languages
  - Official: Telugu
- Time zone: UTC+5:30 (IST)
- Vehicle registration: AP 37, AP 38

Mogalthur mandal is one of the 19 mandals in the West Godavari district of the Indian state of Andhra Pradesh. It is administered under the Narasapuram revenue division.
