= West Godavari district =

- District of Andhra Pradesh
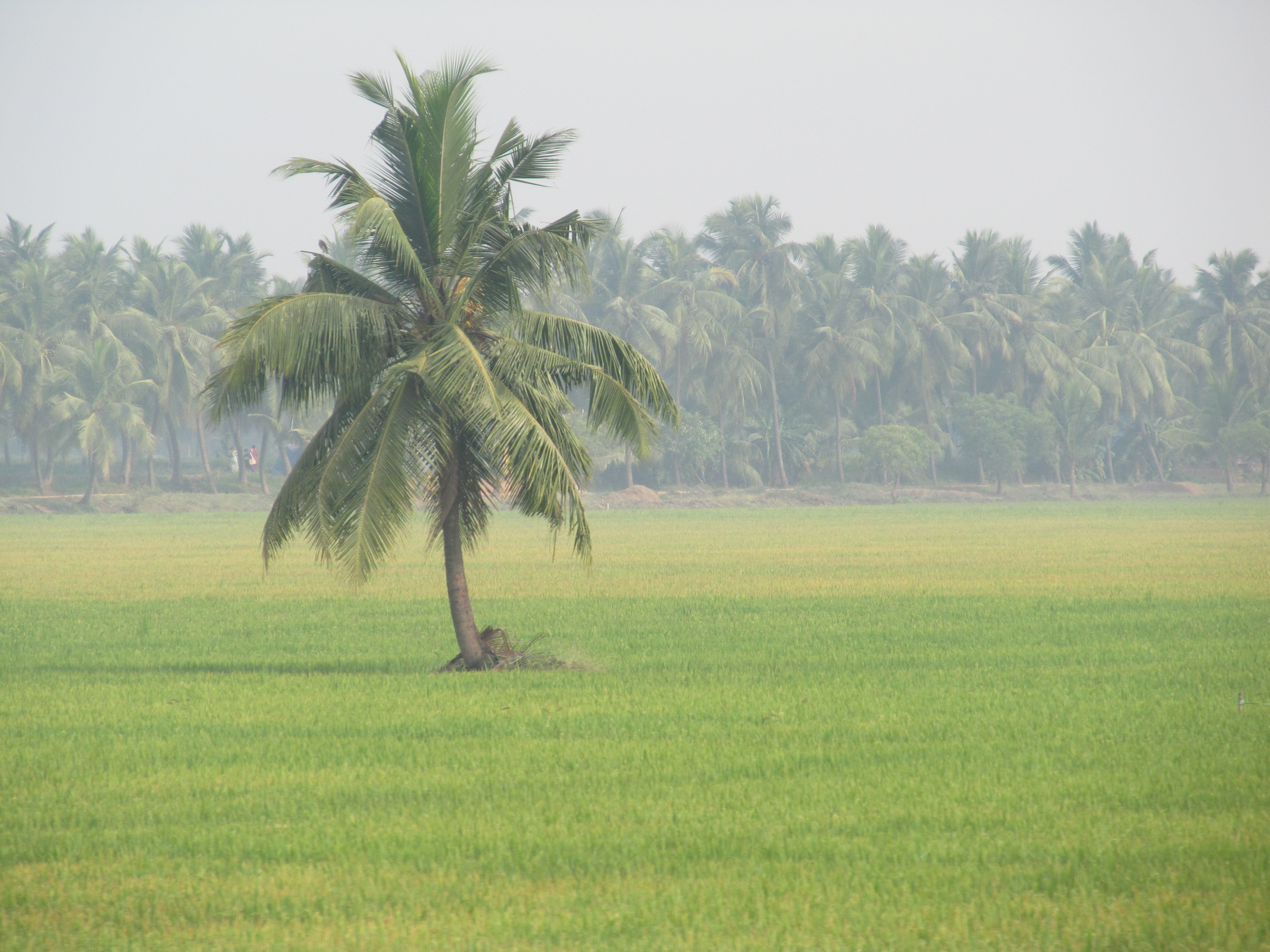
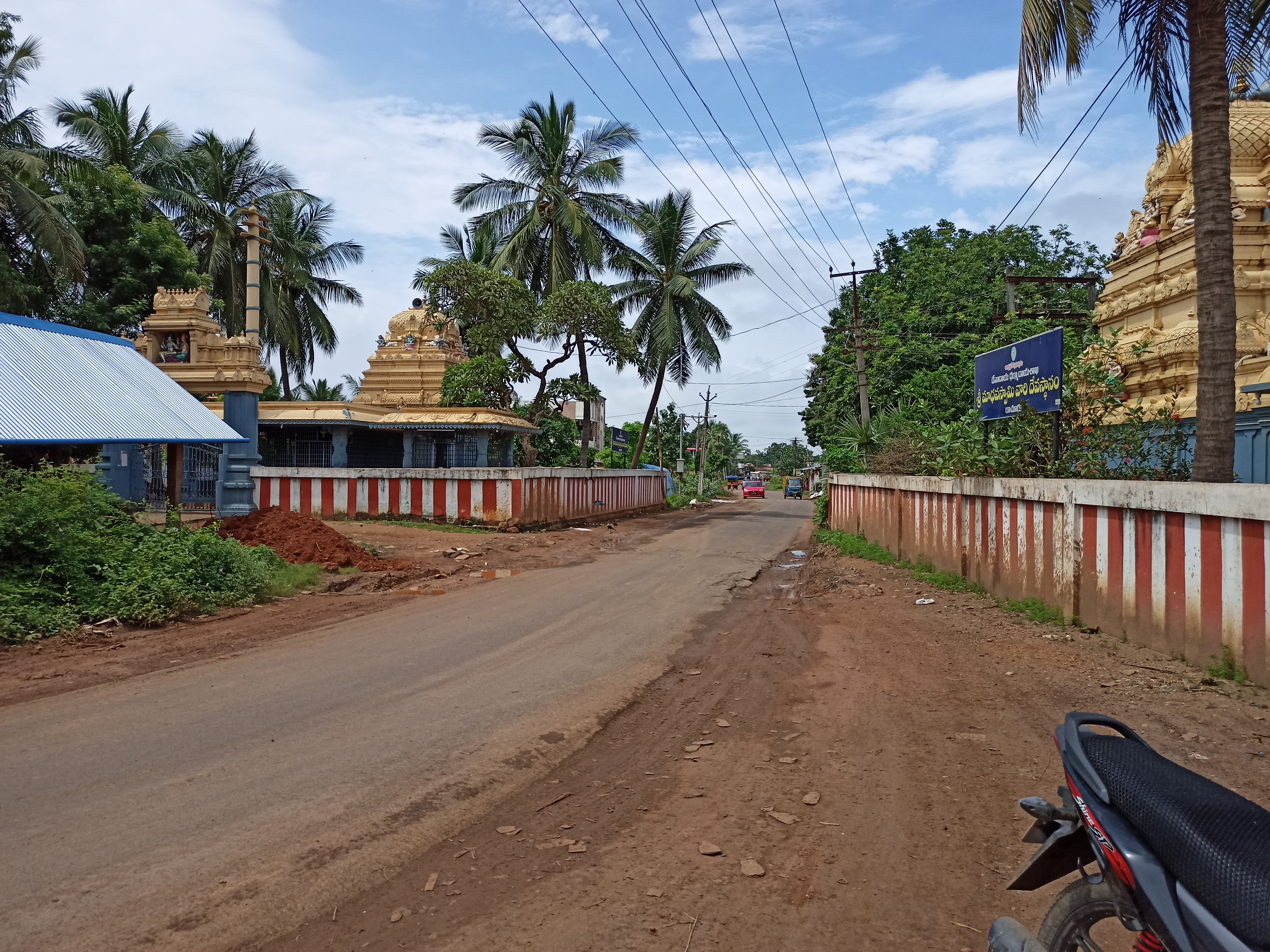
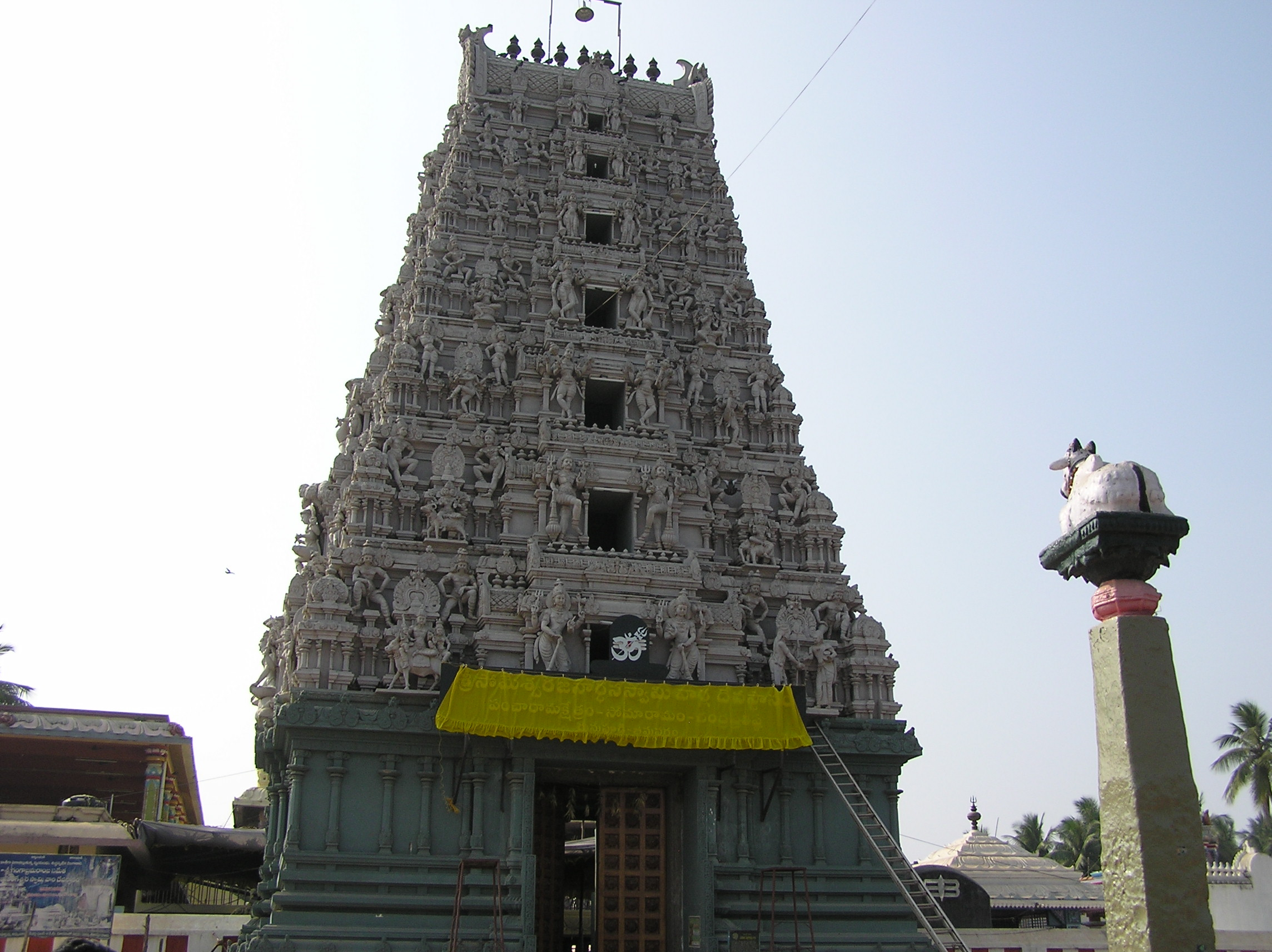
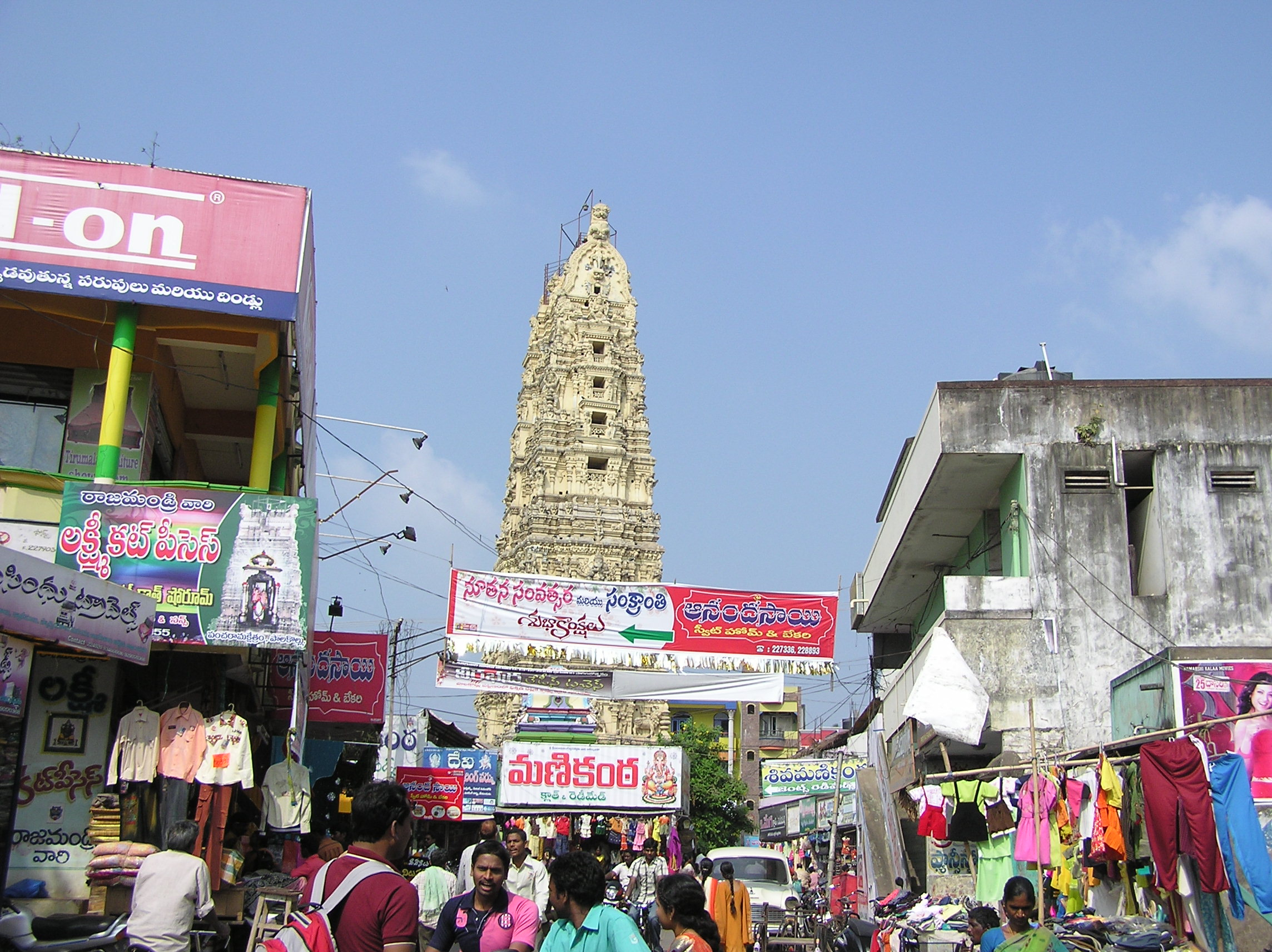
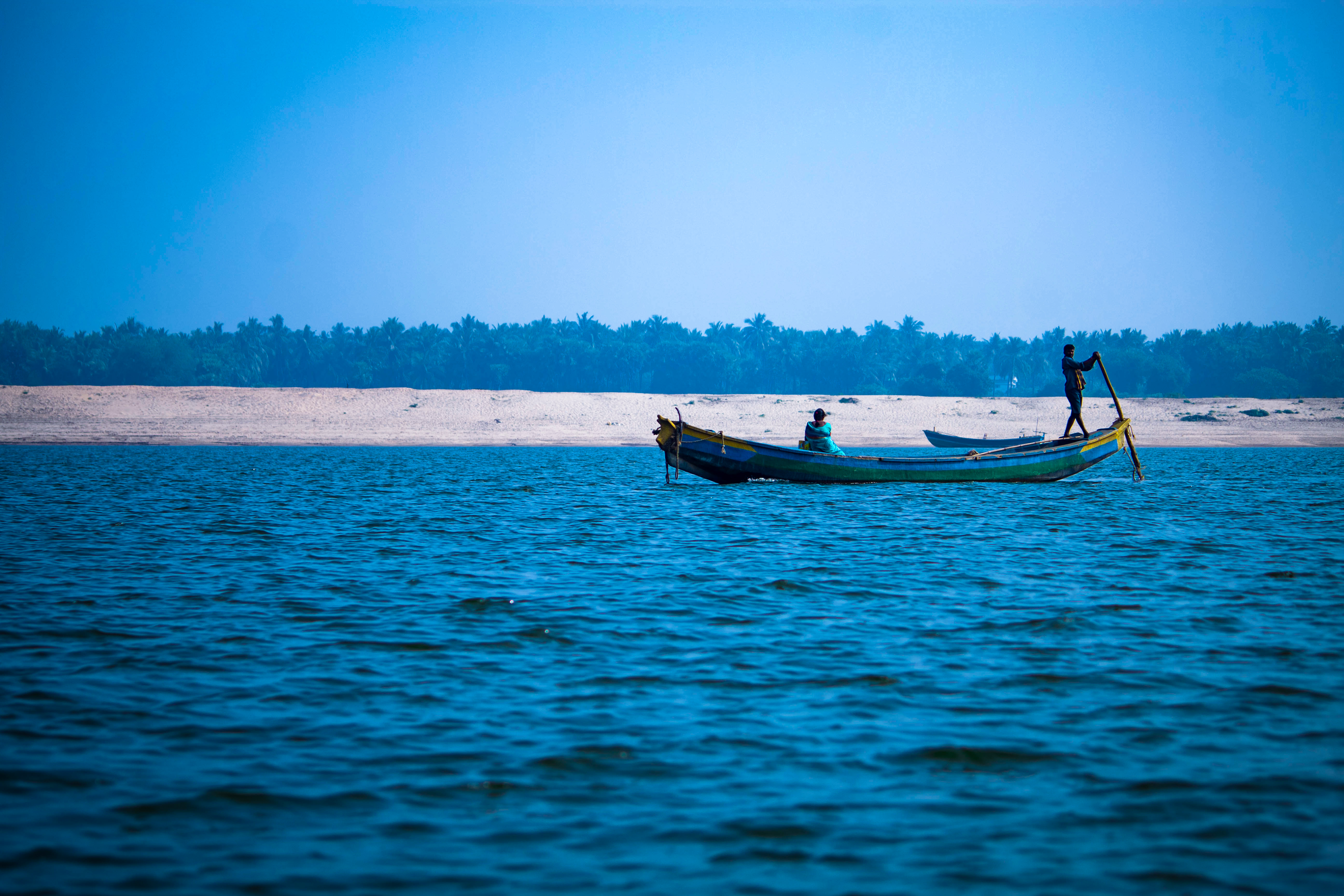
- Clockwise from top-left: Paddy fields near Bhimavaram, Rachuru village, Ramalingeshwaraswamy Temple in Ksheerarama, Godavari at Achanta, Someshwara Swamy Temple

- Location of West Godavari district in Andhra Pradesh
- Interactive map of West Godavari district
- Coordinates: 16.543°N 81.523°E
- Country: India
- State: Andhra Pradesh
- Region: Kosta Andhra
- Established: 1925
- Restructured: 4 April 2022
- Restructured: 16 February 2023
- Headquarters: Bhimavaram
- Mandals: 20

Government
  - District collector: C. Nagarani, I.A.S
  - Lok Sabha constituencies: Narsapuram
  - MP: Bhupathi Raju Srinivasa Varma
  - Assembly constituencies: 07

Area
  - Total: 2,178 km^{2} (841 sq mi)

Population (2011)
  - Total: 1,779,935
  - Density: 817.2/km^{2} (2,117/sq mi)
  - Urban: 468,924
- Time zone: UTC+5:30 (IST)
- Postal Index Number: 534201
- Vehicle registration: AP-37 (former); AP–39 (from 30 January 2019)
- Major highways: NH-16, NH-165, NH-216, NH-216A, NH-365BB, NH-516D, NH-516E
- District LGD code: 523
- District abbreviation: WGI
- Website: westgodavari.ap.gov.in

West Godavari district is a coastal district in the Indian state of Andhra Pradesh with an administrative headquarters in Bhimavaram. It is bounded by the Krishna district and Bay of Bengal to the south, East Godavari district to the east, and Eluru district, Kolleru Lake and Upputeru Drain to the northwest.

== History ==
The Eastern Chalukyas ruled coastal Andhra Pradesh from 700 to 1200 CE, with their capital in Vengi. Historical evidence of their rule has been found in the nearby villages of Pedavegi and Guntupalli (Jilakarragudem). Eluru then became a part of the Kalinga Empire until 1471 CE before the conquest by the Gajapati Empire. In 1515 CE, Sri Krishna Deva Raya captured it. After the fall of the Vijayanagara Kingdom, it was ruled by the Qutb Shahi Dynasty's Sultans of Golkonda.

During the Madras Presidency in 1823, the District of Rajahmundry was created. It was reorganised in 1859 and bifurcated into the Godavari and Krishna districts. Kakinada became the headquarters of the Godavari district, which was further bifurcated into the East Godavari and West Godavari districts in 1925. Eluru became the headquarter

Before the formation of mandals, the district was administered through a system of talukas. In 1978, the number of talukas in the West Godavari district increased from 8 to 19. In 1985, the 19 talukas were divided into 46 mandals. The Andhra Pradesh Reorganisation Act of 2014, merged two mandals from Telangana into the West Godavari District for unified governance over the Polavaram Project, increasing the total mandals to 48.

Erstwhile talukas
S.No.	Erstwhile Talukas in 1971	New Talukas Formed in 1985	New Mandals Formed in 1985
1	Eluru	Eluru	Eluru, Pedapadu, Pedavegi,
1	Eluru	Bhimadole [9]	Bhimadole, Dwaraka Tirumala, Denduluru,
2	Chintalapudi	Chintalapudi	Chintalapudi, T.Narsapuram, Lingapuram, Kamavarapukota,
3	Polavaram	Polavaram	Polavaram, Buttayagudem, jeelugumilli, Koyyalagudem [part], Jangareddygudem [part]
4	Kovvur	Kovvur	Kovvur, Devarapalli, Chagallu, Nidadavole
4	Kovvur	Gopalapuram [10]	Gopalapuram, Tallapudi, Koyyalagudem [part], Jangareddygudem [part],
5	Tadepalligudem	Tadepalligudem	Tadepalligudem, Nallajerla, Unguturu [part]
5	Tadepalligudem	Ganapavaram [11]	Ganapavaram, Unguturu [part], Nidamarru, Pentapadu,
6	Tanuku	Tanuku	Tanuku, Undrajavaram, Peravali,
6	Tanuku	Penumantra [12]	Penumantra, Penugonda, Atili, Iragavaram,
7	Narsapuram	Narsapuram	Narsapuram, Mogalthooru, Yelamanchili,
7	Narsapuram	Poduru [13]	Poduru, Palakollu, Achanta,
8	Bhimavaram	Bhimavaram	Bhimavaram, Palakoderu, Veeravasaram,
8	Bhimavaram	Akiveedu [14]	Akiveedu, Undi, Kalla

Historical population
Year	Pop.	±% p.a.
1901	919,234	—
1911	1,046,050	+1.30%
1921	1,118,436	+0.67%
1931	1,298,758	+1.51%
1941	1,465,111	+1.21%
1951	1,697,727	+1.48%
1961	1,978,257	+1.54%
1971	2,374,306	+1.84%
1981	2,873,958	+1.93%
1991	3,517,568	+2.04%
2001	3,803,517	+0.78%
2011	3,936,966	+0.35%

As of the 2011 Census of India, the West Godavari district has a population of 3,936,966 with 1,091,525 households, which is the 11th most populous district in the state. The district's population is approximately equal to the population of Croatia and the American state of Oklahoma.

The district was the 19th largest in terms of area with an area of 7,742 km^{2} (2,989 sq mi) and has a population density of 509/km^{2} (1,320/sq mi), which is the fourth-most densely populated district in the state. Its population growth rate between 2001–2011 was 3.45%. West Godavari has a sex ratio of 1004 females for every 1000 males and stands at the eighth position. It has the highest literacy rate among all Andhra Pradesh districts with 26,52,389 (74.63%) literate residents. 20.6% of the district's population lives in urban areas.

After the 4 April 2022 bifurcation for a separate Eluru district, Bhimavaram became the new headquarters of the West Godavari district. Ganapavaram mandal was added to West godavari district on 16 February 2023.

== Geography ==
The district occupies an area of 2,178 sq mi (5,640 km^{2}). The district is bounded by the East Godavari district on the North, Eluru district on the Northwest, Konaseema district on the Southeast, Krishna district on the Southwest. and Bay of Bengal on the south. The Godavari River flows on the east, while the Tammileru River and Kolleru Lake separate it from the Krishna district on the west.

=== Rivers and topography ===
West Godavari is a flat region with a slightly slope along the rivers flowing eastward. The three rivers cutting through the district are the Godavari (after which the district is named), the Yerrakaluva, and the Tammileru. Sir Arthur Cotton Barrage, Eluru Canal, Vijayarai Anicut, Tammileru, Jalleru, and the Yerrakaluva reservoirs are the major sources of irrigation.

== Climate ==
The region has a tropical climate similar to the rest of the Coastal Andhra region. The summers (March–June) are very hot and dry, while the winters are much cooler. The temperatures in the summers often rise over 40 °C during the day. The rainy season (July–December) is considered the best time for tourist visits, as the fields are bright green with paddy crops, rivers are flowing with monsoon water, and climate is relatively cool. There are several large mensions scattered around the Godavari area that once belonged to zamindars.

== Demographics ==
Religions in West Godavari district as of 2025 based on 2011 census data
Religion	Percent
Hindus	94.60%
Christians	3.72%
Muslims	1.46%
Other or not stated	0.22%
Distribution of religions

As of 16 February 2023, the population based on 2011 census is 1,844,898. The male population is 921,771, while the female population is 923,127. The district has a sex ratio of 1001 females to 1000 males. 468,924 (25.42%) of the population lives in urban areas. Scheduled Castes and Scheduled Tribes made up 302,836 (16.41%) and 16,332 (0.89%) of the population respectively.

Languages of West Godavari district (2011)
1. Telugu (98.70%)
2. Urdu (0.92%)
3. Others (0.38%)

Telugu was the predominant language, spoken by 98.70% of the population. A small population of 0.92% speaks Urdu.

== Administrative divisions ==
The new West Godavari district has three revenue divisions, Bhimavaram, Tadepalligudem and Narasapuram . These revenue divisions divide the district into 20 mandals. These 20 mandals consists of 318 Revenue villages.

1. Bhimavaram revenue division
  1. Akiveedu
  2. Bhimavaram
  3. Ganapavaram
  4. Kalla
  5. Palakoderu
  6. Undi
  7. Veeravasaram
2. Narasapuram revenue division
  1. Achanta
  2. Mogalthur
  3. Narasapuram
  4. Palakollu
  5. Penugonda
  6. Penumantra
  7. Poduru
  8. Yelamanchili
3. Tadepalligudem revenue division
  1. Attili
  2. Iragavaram
  3. Pentapadu
  4. Tadepalligudem
  5. Tanuku

== Cities and towns ==
There are 6 municipalities.

Municipal Bodies in West Godavari District
S.No.	Municipal Body	Civic Status of town	No. of wards	Municipality Formation Year	2011 Census Population
1	Bhimavaram	Municipality Grade - Selection	52	1948	1,46,961
2	Tadepalligudem	Municipality Grade - Selection	48	1958	1,34,295
3	Palakollu	Municipality Grade - special	44	1919	1,04,032
4	Tanuku	Municipality Grade - Selection	44	1979	1,04,892
5	Narasapuram	Municipality Grade - 1	31	1956	58,770
6	Akiveedu	Nagar Panchayat	20	2020	36,000

=== Constituencies ===
==== Parliament Segment ====
The district is part of two parliamentary and eight assembly constituencies in the district.

- Narasapuram (Lok Sabha constituency)
- Eluru Lok Sabha constituency

=== Assembly segments ===
Constituency number	Name	Reserved for (SC/ST/None)	Parliament
56	Achanta	None	Narasapuram
57	Palakollu	None	Narasapuram
58	Narasapuram	None	Narasapuram
59	Bhimavaram	None	Narasapuram
60	Undi	None	Narasapuram
61	Tanuku	None	Narasapuram
62	Tadepalligudem	None	Narasapuram
	Unguturu (part))	None	Eluru

== Economy ==
The gross district domestic product is ₹45,963 crore (US$4.9 billion) and it contributes 8.8% to the gross state domestic product. For the FY 2013–14, the per capita income at current prices was ₹86,974 (US$930).

Paddy, banana, sugarcane, and coconut are the main agricultural products cultivated in the district. The agriculture sector contributes ₹18,385 crore (US$2.0 billion), industries contribute ₹7,086 crore (US$760 million), and services contribute ₹20,491 crore (US$2.2 billion) to the gross district domestic product. The major products contributing to the gross value added of the district from agriculture and allied services are the previously listed agricultural products, as well as milk, meat, and fisheries. The gross value added to the industrial and service sector is contributed from construction, electricity, manufacturing, unorganised trade, and transport.

Cashew nut, mango and tobacco are other important produce from the district. Shrimp production is also a main activity along with fish farming. The woolen pile carpet industry in Eluru produces eco-friendly carpets from exported wool.

== Culture ==
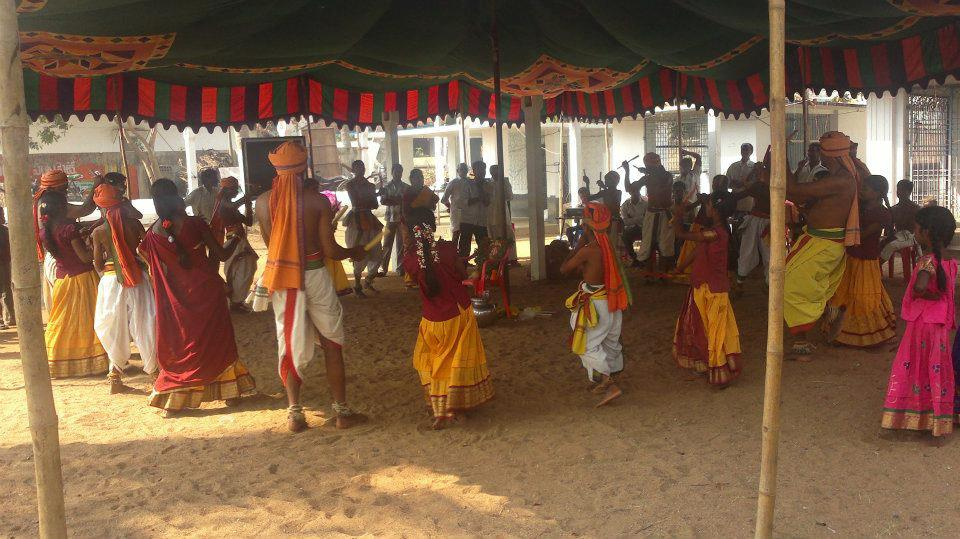
Culture and traditions at Kalavalapalli village in West Godavari district

The Vedas, which have oral heritage recognition by UNESCO, are taught at the Sri Venkateswara Veda Patasala in I. Bhimavaram village in Akiveedu mandal. The district is well known for its wool-pile carpets and hand woven products.

=== Tourism and landmarks ===
Some of the religious destinations include Pancharama Kshetras of Palakollu and Bhimavaram. Other tourist destinations of importance are Perupalem Beach at Narasapuram, the Kolleru Lake (the largest fresh water lake in the country and a bird sanctuary),

== Transport ==
=== Roadways ===
The total road length of state highways in the district is 1,229 km (764 mi). The district relies mostly on public transport, such as buses of the Andhra Pradesh State Road Transport Corporation. Most of the major national highways, like NH216 and NH165, pass through towns in the district.

=== Railways ===
The South Central Railway division of Indian Railways operates many passenger routes and freight transport through the district. The Howrah-Chennai main line, Vijayawada–Nidadavolu loop line, and Bhimavaram–Narasapuram branch lines are the major lines and sections that provide rail connectivity in the district. The Kovvur-Bhadrachalam Railway line and Kotipalli-Narsapur Railway line are the major railway projects in the district.

=== Waterways ===
National Waterway 4 passes through the district and connects Puducherry with Kakinada and Rajahmundry via Tadepalligudem, Eluru. It has access to the Bay of Bengal at Narsapuram. The Andhra Pradesh state government began construction of a fishing harbor in Narsapuram in September 2021.

== Education ==
The primary and secondary schools are maintained by the government under the state's School Education Department of the state, supplemented by private institutions. According to the school information report for the 2015–16 academic year, there are a total of 4,408 schools. They include 19 government, 2,664 mandal and zilla parishads, 1 residential schools, 1,344 private schools, 3 Kasturba Gandhi Balika Vidyalaya (KGBV), 208 municipal schools, and 169 other types of schools. The total number of students enrolled in primary, upper primary, and high schools within the district was 522,793 during the 2015-16 school year.

=== Universities ===
- Dr. Y.S.R. Horticultural University, Venkataramannagudem, Tadepalligudem
- National Institute of Technology, Tadepalligudem (NIT, Tadepalligudem)

== Notable people ==
- Brahmaji, film actor
- Chiranjeevi, film actor, Central Minister
- Arvind Krishna, IBM CEO
- Raju Peddada, industrial and graphic designer
- Prabhas, actor
- Alluri Sitarama Raju, freedom fighter
- Krishnam Raju, film actor, Central Minister
- Ramalinga Raju, founder of Satyam Computer Services
- Trivikram Srinivas, film director
- Sunil (actor), actor
- Krishna Vamsi, film director
- Bhupathi Raju Srinivasa Varma, Central Minister

== See also ==
- List of villages in West Godavari district
- Gundupillar
