= Jangareddygudem revenue division =

Coordinates: 16.7°N 81.1°E

- revenue division in Eluru district
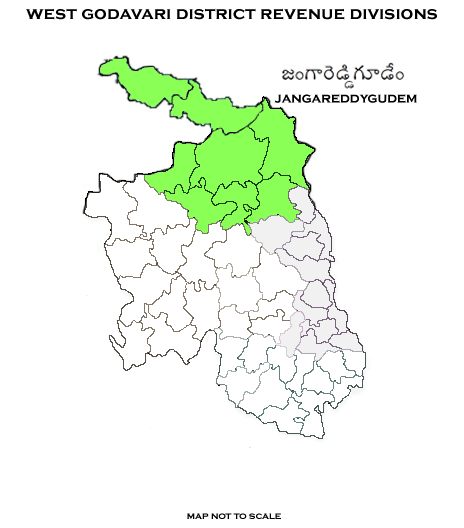
- Jangareddygudem revenue division in West Godavari district
- Country: India
- State: Andhra Pradesh
- District: Eluru

Jangareddygudem revenue division (or Jangareddygudem division) is an administrative division in the Eluru district of the Indian state of Andhra Pradesh. It is one of the 3 revenue divisions in the district which consists of 10 mandals under its administration. Jangareddygudem is the divisional headquarters.

== Administration ==
Kukunoor and Velerupadu were transferred to West Godavari district from Khammam district of Telangana. The 10 mandals administered under Jangareddygudem revenue division are:

| No. | Mandals |
|---|---|
| 1 | Jangareddygudem mandal |
| 2 | Polavaram mandal |
| 3 | Buttayagudem mandal |
| 4 | Jeelugu Milli mandal |
| 5 | Koyyalagudem mandal |
| 6 | Kukunoor |
| 7 | Velerupadu |
| 8 | Kamavarapukota mandal |
| 9 | T.Narasapuram mandal |
| 10 | Dwaraka Tirumala mandal |

== See also ==
- List of revenue divisions in Andhra Pradesh
- List of mandals in Andhra Pradesh
