= Lingapalem Mandal =

- Mandal
- Interactive map of Lingapalem Mandal
- Location in Andhra Pradesh, India
- Coordinates: 16°57′01″N 80°59′23″E
- Country: India
- State: Andhra Pradesh
- District: Eluru
- Headquarters: Lingapalem

Government
  - Body: Mandal Parishad

Population (2011)
  - Total: 58,360

Languages
  - Official: Telugu
- Time zone: UTC+5:30 (IST)
- Vehicle registration: AP 37

Lingapalem Mandal is one of 28 mandals in the Eluru district of Andhra Pradesh in India. Its headquarters are located in Lingapalem. It is bordered by T.Narasapuram and Chintalapudi in the North, Khammam district tin the West, Kamavarapukota mandal in the East, and Pedavegi mandal in the South.

== Demographics ==
Lingapalem Mandal has a population of 58,360 in 15,626 households per the 2011 census. Of this total, 29,546 are male and 28,814 are female. There are 5,786 children between 0 and 6 years old, of which 2,896 are male and 2,890 are female. The average literacy rate is 67.60% with 35,553 literate people in total; of which 19,100 are male and 16,453 are female.

The majority of the population (23,897) have been designated as members of Scheduled Castes, with 329 belonging to Scheduled Tribes.

=== Work profile ===
Per the 2011 census, 32,623 Lingapalem Mandal residents described themselves as labourers, including 18,862 men and 13,761 women. Of the 30,021 labourers who described their primary occupations, 23,361 were agricultural labourers, 3,497 were cultivators, 264 were domestic labourers and 2,899 worked in other areas.

== Administration ==
Lingapalem Mandal is under the administration of the Chintalapudi Assembly constituency of Eluru, and is one of the sixteen mandals under the Eluru revenue division.

== Towns and villages ==
As of the 2011 census, the mandal has 25 village settlements with Lingapalem being the most populated and Malleswaram being the least.

The settlements in the mandal include:

1. Asannagudem
2. Ayyaparajugudem
3. Badarala
4. Bhogole
5. Chandrannapalem
6. Dharmajigudem
7. Ganapavarigudem
8. Juvvachalakarayudupalem
9. Kalarayanagudem
10. Kalyanampadu
11. Konijerla
12. Kothapalle
13. Kothulagokavaram
14. Lingapalem
15. Malleswaram
16. Mattamgudem
17. Mudicherla
18. Mulagalampadu
19. Patchanagaram
20. Puppalavarigudem
21. Rangapuram
22. Singagudem
23. Thimmakkapalem
24. Vemulapalle
25. Yedavalli

== Education ==
The mandal plays a major role in education for students from nearby rural villages. Lingapalem Mandal's primary and secondary education consists of both public and private schools, according to the state's School Education Department. As per the school information report for the 2015-2016 academic year, the mandal had more than 7,016 students enrolled in over 80 schools.

== Transport ==
Lingapalem lies on State Highway 43 connecting Chintalapudi to Eluru.

== See also ==
- List of mandals in Andhra Pradesh
- Eluru
