= Uppugudem =

- Village
- Interactive map of Uppugudem
- Location in Andhra Pradesh, India Uppugudem (India)
- Coordinates: 16°45′19″N 81°08′12″E
- Country: India
- State: Andhra Pradesh
- District: Eluru
- Mandal: Denduluru

Population (2011)
  - Total: 121

Languages
  - Official: Telugu
- Time zone: UTC+05:30 (IST)

Uppugudem is a village in Eluru district of the Indian state of Andhra Pradesh. It is administered under of Eluru revenue division.

== Demographics ==
As of 2011 Census of India, Uppugudem has population of 121 of which 51 are males while 51 are females. Average Sex Ratio is 1373. Population of children with age 0-6 is 11 which makes up 9.09% of total population of village, Child sex ratio is 120. Literacy rate of the village was 50.91%.
