= Vanguru =

- Village
- Interactive map of Vanguru
- Location in Andhra Pradesh, India Vanguru (India)
- Coordinates: 16.7525°N 81.0788°E
- Country: India
- State: Andhra Pradesh
- District: Eluru
- Mandal: Pedavegi mandal
- Elevation: 16 m (52 ft)

Population (2011)
  - Total: 2,170

Languages
  - Official: Telugu
- Time zone: UTC+05:30 (IST)
- Postal code: 534 002

Vanguru is a village in Eluru district of the Indian state of Andhra Pradesh. It is located in Pedavegi mandal of Eluru revenue division. It is located at a distance of 4 km from district headquarters Eluru city.

== Demographics ==
As of 2011 Census of India, Vanguru has a population of 2170. 1085 males and 1085 females live there, forming a sex ratio of 1000 females per 1000 males. 233 children are in the age group of 0–6 years, with child sex ratio of 958 girls per 1000 boys. The literacy rate stands at 64.95%.
