= Korukollu =

- village
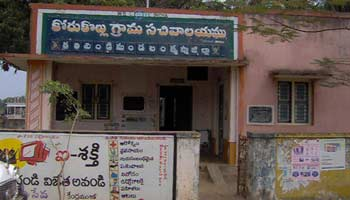
- Panchayathi Office
- Interactive map of Korukollu
- Location in Andhra Pradesh, India Korukollu (India)
- Coordinates: 16°28′51″N 81°14′36″E
- Country: India
- State: Andhra Pradesh
- District: Eluru

Government
  - Type: Democratic

Area
  - Total: 18.37 km^{2} (7.09 sq mi)
- Elevation: 11 m (36 ft)

Population (2011)
  - Total: 8,333
  - Density: 453.6/km^{2} (1,175/sq mi)

Languages
  - Official: Telugu
- Time zone: UTC+5:30 (IST)
- PIN: 521343
- Telephone code: 91-08677
- Vehicle registration: AP-16
- Lok Sabha constituency: Eluru
- Vidhan Sabha constituency: Kaikaluru
- Climate: Tropical wet (Köppen)

Korukollu is a small village in the Kalidindi mandal of Eluru district in Andhra Pradesh, India.

== Geography ==
The climate is tropical, with hot summers and moderate winters. The average warmest month is May.On average, the coolest month is January.The maximum average precipitation occurs in August. The peak temperature reaches 37 °C (99 °F) in May–June, while the winter temperature is 19-28 C. The average humidity is 78% and the average annual rainfall is 103 cm. Korukollu gets its rainfall from both the south-west monsoon and north-east monsoon.

Climate

Korukollu

Climate chart (precipitation, max. and min. temperature)
J	F	M	A	M	J	J	A	S	O	N	D
5.1 28 19	10 30 21	7.6 32 22	10 34 26	20 37 27	86 37 27	170 33 26	180 32 25	155 32 25	178 31 24	117 30 21	20 28 19
- █ Average max. and min. temperatures in °C
- █ Precipitation totals in mm
Imperial conversion
J	F	M	A	M	J	J	A	S	O	N	D
0.2 82 66	0.4 86 70	0.3 90 72	0.4 93 79	0.8 99 81	3.4 99 81	6.7 91 79	7.1 90 77	6.1 90 77	7 88 75	4.6 86 70	0.8 82 66
- █ Average max. and min. temperatures in °F
- █ Precipitation totals in inches

== Demographics ==
Population

- Total: 10500
- Male: 5000
- Female: 5500
