= Gopannapalem =

- Village
- Interactive map of Gopannapalem
- Location in Andhra Pradesh, India Gopannapalem (India)
- Coordinates: 16.45025°N 81.06508°E
- Country: India
- State: Andhra Pradesh
- District: Eluru
- Mandal: Denduluru

Area
  - Total: 1.71 km^{2} (0.66 sq mi)
- Elevation: 17 m (56 ft)

Population (2011)
  - Total: 1,772
  - Density: 1,040/km^{2} (2,680/sq mi)

Languages
  - Official: Telugu
- Time zone: UTC+05:30 (IST)
- Postal code: 534 450

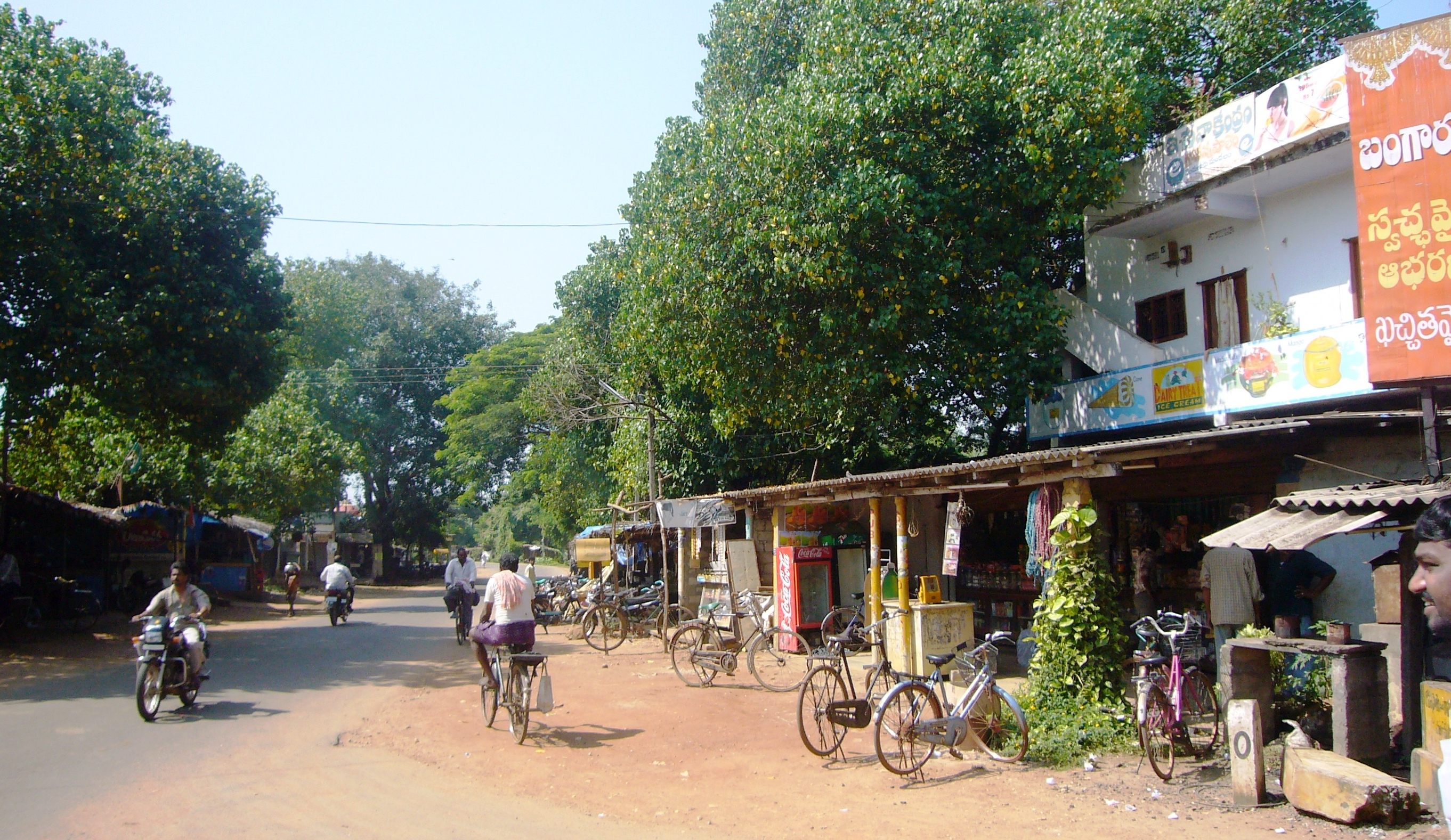
A picture of the village

Gopannapalem is a village in Eluru district of the Indian state of Andhra Pradesh. It is located on the north side of district headquarters Eluru at a distance of 06 km. It is under of Eluru revenue division. The nearest train station is Powerpet (PRH) located at a distance of 2.13 km.

== Demographics ==
As of 2011 Census of India, Gopannapalem has a population of 1722, of which 886 are males and 836 are females. The average sex ratio of Gopannapalem is 944. The population of children with age 0-6 is 172 which makes up 10.02% of total population of village. The literacy rate was 74%.
