= Ramasingavaram =

- Village
- Interactive map of Ramasingavaram
- Location in Andhra Pradesh, India Ramasingavaram (India)
- Coordinates: 16.49533°N 81.09364°E
- Country: India
- State: Andhra Pradesh
- District: Eluru
- Mandal: Pedavegi mandal

Area
  - Total: 1.68 km^{2} (0.65 sq mi)
- Elevation: 16 m (52 ft)

Population (2011)
  - Total: 8,308
  - Density: 4,950/km^{2} (12,800/sq mi)

Languages
  - Official: Telugu
- Time zone: UTC+05:30 (IST)
- Postal code: 534 450

Ramasingavaram is a village in Eluru district of the Indian state of Andhra Pradesh. It is located in Pedavegi mandal of Eluru revenue division. Eluru is the nearest railway station located at a distance of more than 10 kilometres (6.2 mi) from Ramasingavaram.

== Demographics ==
As of 2011 Census of India, Ramasingavaram had a population of 8,308. The total population constitutes 4,228 males and 4,080 females, a sex ratio of 95 females per 100 males. 998 children are in the age group of 0–6 years, with a child sex ratio of 1,024 girls per 1,000 boys. The average literacy rate stands at 63.91% with 5,310 literate people.
