= Pinakadimi =

- Village
- Interactive map of Pinakadimi
- Location in Andhra Pradesh, India Pinakadimi (India)
- Coordinates: 16.75°N 81.07°E
- Country: India
- State: Andhra Pradesh
- District: Eluru
- Mandal: Pedavegi mandal
- Elevation: 18 m (59 ft)

Population (2011)
  - Total: 2,744

Languages
  - Official: Telugu
- Time zone: UTC+05:30 (IST)
- Postal code: 534 005

Pinakadimi is a village in Eluru district of the Indian state of Andhra Pradesh. It is located in Pedavegi mandal of Eluru revenue division. It is located at a distance of 7 km from district headquarters Eluru city.

Pinakadimi village has private and public schools. This village has degree collage and Dental college. Boundaries shows to Duggirala for these colleges but these are in Pinakadimi.

Pinakadimi is a village mainly depended on agriculture . This village given so many educated people who are working in different countries and different states of India.

There are 5 parts in Pinakadimi call it as Padamati Donka, Uttara Donka, Pedda Cheruvu, Main Village, Gudems and Tammiledu side.

== Demographics ==
As of 2011 Census of India, The Pinakadimi village has population of 2744 of which 1384 are males while 1360 are females as per Population Census 2011. In Pinakadimi village population of children with age 0-6 is 343 which makes up 12.50% of total population of village. Average Sex Ratio of Pinakadimi village is 983 which is lower than Andhra Pradesh state average of 993. Child Sex Ratio for the Pinakadimi as per census is 960, higher than Andhra Pradesh average of 939.

Pinakadimi village has lower literacy rate compared to Andhra Pradesh. In 2011, literacy rate of Pinakadimi village was 66.31% compared to 67.02% of Andhra Pradesh. In Pinakadimi Male literacy stands at 73.20% while female literacy rate was 59.31%.
