= Chakrayagudem =

- Village
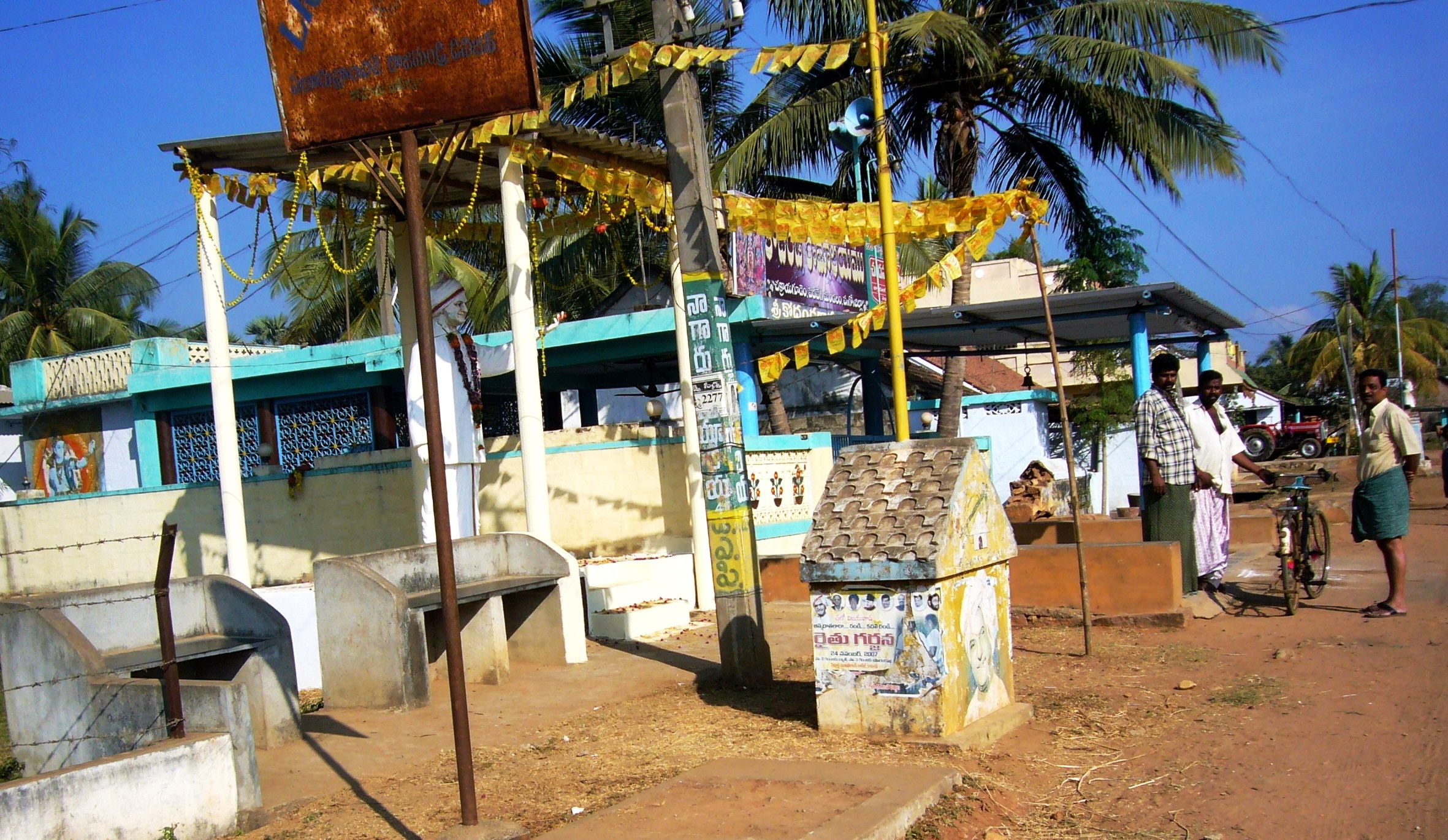
- Kodandarama Temple in Chakrayagudem village - West Godavari Dist, Andra Pradesh
- Interactive map of Chakrayagudem
- Location in Andhra Pradesh, India Chakrayagudem (India)
- Coordinates: 16.51398°N 81.09313°E
- Country: India
- State: Andhra Pradesh
- District: Eluru
- Mandal: Pedavegi

Area
  - Total: 1.04 km^{2} (0.40 sq mi)
- Elevation: 15 m (49 ft)

Population (2011)
  - Total: 1,390
  - Density: 1,340/km^{2} (3,460/sq mi)

Languages
  - Official: Telugu
- Time zone: UTC+05:30 (IST)
- Postal code: 534 475

Chakrayagudem is a village in the Eluru district of the Indian state of Andhra Pradesh. It is located in the Pedavegi mandal of the Eluru revenue division.

== Demographics ==
As of 2011 census of India, Chakrayagudem had a population of 1,390. The total population constitute, 689 males and 701 females — a sex ratio of 983 females per 1000 males. 140 children are in the age group of 0–6 years, with a child sex ratio of 1090 girls per 1000 boys. The average literacy rate stands at 74.16%, with 927 literates.
