= Challapalle, Eluru district =

Challapalle
- Village
- Interactive map of Challapalle
- Location in Andhra Pradesh, India Challapalle (India)
- Coordinates: 16.7556°N 81.1058°E
- Country: India
- State: Andhra Pradesh
- District: Eluru
- Mandal: Denduluru

Population (2011)
  - Total: 630

Languages
  - Official: Telugu
- Time zone: UTC+05:30 (IST)

Challapalle (also known as Challapalli) is a village in Eluru district of the Indian state of Andhra Pradesh. It is administered under of Eluru revenue division.

== Geography ==
Challapalle is located at 16.7556ºN and 81.1058ºE. Notable nearby features include the Bay of Bengal to the east, and Eastern Ghats mountains to the west. The nearest significant population center from Challapalle is Avanigadda, 6 kilometers south.

== Climate ==
In Challapalle, the wet season is oppressive and overcast, the dry season is muggy and partly cloudy, and it is hot year round. Over the course of the year, the temperature typically varies from 69°F to 98°F and is rarely below 66°F or above 105°F.

The hot season lasts for 2.3 months, from 28 March to 6 June, with an average daily high temperature above 95°F. The hottest month of the year in Challapalle is May, with an average high of 98°F and low of 84°F.

The cool season lasts for 3.5 months, from 13 October to 28 January, with an average daily high temperature below 86°F. The coldest month of the year in Challapalle is December, with an average low of 70°F and high of 83°F.

The rainy period of the year lasts for 8.5 months, from 14 April to 29 December, with a sliding 31-day rainfall of at least 0.5 inches. The month with the most rain in Challapalle is October, with an average rainfall of 7.1 inches.

The rainless period of the year lasts for 3.5 months, from 29 December to 14 April. The month with the least rain in Challapalle is March, with an average rainfall of 0.2 inches.

== Demographics ==
As of 2011 Census of India, Challapalle has population of 630 of which 302 are males while 328 are females. Average Sex Ratio is 1086. Population of children with age 0-6 is 79 which makes up 12.54% of total population of village, Child sex ratio is 1026. Literacy rate of the village was 66.61%.
