= Kothapalle, Eluru district =

Kothapalle
- Village
- Interactive map of Kothapalle
- Location in Andhra Pradesh, India Kothapalle (India)
- Coordinates: 16.7821°N 81.1062°E
- Country: India
- State: Andhra Pradesh
- District: Eluru
- Mandal: Denduluru

Population (2011)
  - Total: 1,767

Languages
  - Official: Telugu
- Time zone: UTC+05:30 (IST)

Kothapalle is a village in Eluru district of the Indian state of Andhra Pradesh. It is administered under of Eluru revenue division. Attili Rail way station and Manchili railway station are nearest train stations.

== Demographics ==
As of 2011 Census of India, Kothapalle has population of 1676 of which 901 are males while 866 are females. Average Sex Ratio is 961. Population of children with age 0-6 is 194 which makes up 10.98% of total population of village, Child sex ratio is 960. Literacy rate of the village was 75.46%.
