= Galayagudem =

- Village
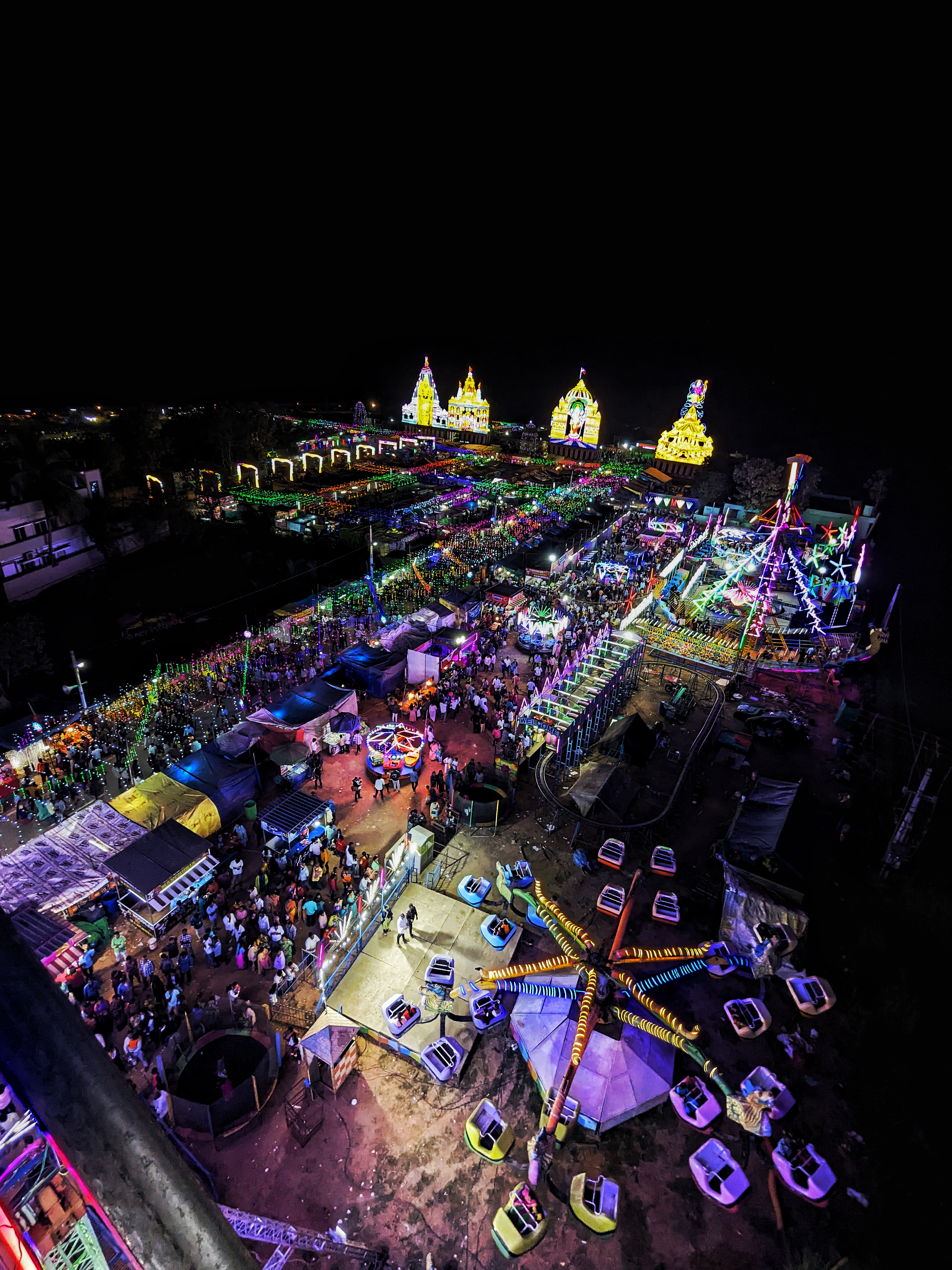
- Achhamma Perantalu Mahotsavam in 2024
- Interactive map of Galayagudem
- Location in Andhra Pradesh, India Galayagudem (India)
- Coordinates: 16.45030°N 81.06510°E
- Country: India
- State: Andhra Pradesh
- District: Eluru
- Mandal: Denduluru

Area
  - Total: 2.77 km^{2} (1.07 sq mi)
- Elevation: 18 m (59 ft)

Population (2011)
  - Total: 2,374
  - Density: 857/km^{2} (2,220/sq mi)

Languages
  - Official: Telugu
- Time zone: UTC+05:30 (IST)
- Postal code: 534 450

Galayagudem is a village in Eluru district of the Indian state of Andhra Pradesh. It is located on the north side of district headquarters Eluru at a distance of 10 km. It is under of Eluru revenue division. The nearest train station is Denduluru(DEL) located at a distance of 5.44 Km.

== History ==
The Achhamma Perantalamma temple in Galayagudem was built in 1957. Every year, the community celebrates a nine-day event known as the Achhamma Perantalu Mahotsavam.

== Demographics ==
As of 2011 Census of India, Galayagudem has a population of 2374 of which 1197 are males while 1177 are females. Average Sex Ratio of Galayagudem village is 983. Population of children with age 0-6 is 269 which makes up 13.65% of total population of village. Literacy rate of Galayagudem village was 69.83% with 1470 literates.
