= Sriramavaram =

- Village
- Interactive map of Sriramavaram
- Location in Andhra Pradesh, India Sriramavaram (India)
- Coordinates: 16°48′45″N 81°11′39″E
- Country: India
- State: Andhra Pradesh
- District: Eluru
- Mandal: Denduluru

Population (2011)
  - Total: 2,217

Languages
  - Official: Telugu
- Time zone: UTC+05:30 (IST)

Sriramavaram is a village in Eluru district of the Indian state of Andhra Pradesh. It is administered under Eluru revenue division.

== Demographics ==
As of 2011 Census of India, Sriramavaram has population of 2217 of which 1133 are males while 1084 are females. Average Sex Ratio is 957. Population of children with age 0-6 is 263 which makes up 11.86% of total population of village, Child sex ratio is 105. Literacy rate of the village was 71.19%.
