= Akkireddigudem, Eluru district =

Akkireddigudem
- Village
- Interactive map of Akkireddigudem
- Location in Andhra Pradesh, India Akkireddigudem (India)
- Coordinates: 16.7978°N 81.1577°E
- Country: India
- State: Andhra Pradesh
- District: Eluru
- Mandal: Denduluru mandal

Population (2011)
  - Total: 1,330

Languages
  - Official: Telugu
- Time zone: UTC+05:30 (IST)

Akkireddigudem is a village in Eluru district of the Indian state of Andhra Pradesh. It is administered under of Eluru revenue division.

== Demographics ==
As of 2011 Census of India, Ankireddigudem has population of 1300 of which 654 are males while 646 are females. Average Sex Ratio is 988. Population of children with age 0-6 is 119 which makes up 9.15% of total population of village, Child sex ratio is 776. Literacy rate of the village was 74.43%.
