= Gudigunta =

Gudigunta Jogannapalem
- Village
- Interactive map of Gudigunta
- Location in Andhra Pradesh, India Gudigunta (India)
- Coordinates: 16.48405°N 81.10054°E
- Country: India
- State: Andhra Pradesh
- District: Eluru
- Mandal: Denduluru

Area
  - Total: 9.22 km^{2} (3.56 sq mi)
- Elevation: 15 m (49 ft)

Population (2011)
  - Total: 2,988
  - Density: 324/km^{2} (839/sq mi)

Languages
  - Official: Telugu
- Time zone: UTC+05:30 (IST)
- Postal code: 534 475

Gudigunta is a village in Eluru district of the Indian state of Andhra Pradesh. It is located in Denduluru mandal of Eluru revenue division. The nearest railway station is Ontimitta (VNM) located at a distance of 40.96 km (25.45 mi).

== Demographics ==
At the 2011 Census of India, Gudigunta had a population of 2,988 (1,499 males and 1,489 females with a sex ratio of 993 females per 1000 males). 170 children were in the age group of 0–6 years, with a child sex ratio of 1,152 girls per 1,000 boys. The average literacy rate stood at 79.95% with 2253 literates.
