= Somavarappadu =

- Village
- Interactive map of Somavarappadu
- Location in Andhra Pradesh, India Somavarappadu (India)
- Coordinates: 16.74°N 81.10°E
- Country: India
- State: Andhra Pradesh
- District: Eluru
- Mandal: Denduluru

Area
  - Total: 2.58 km^{2} (1.00 sq mi)
- Elevation: 15 m (49 ft)

Population (2011)
  - Total: 3,015
  - Density: 1,170/km^{2} (3,030/sq mi)

Languages
  - Official: Telugu
- Time zone: UTC+05:30 (IST)
- Postal code: 534 450

Somavarappadu is a village in Eluru district of the Indian state of Andhra Pradesh. It is located to the north of district headquarters Eluru at a distance of 6 km. It is under Eluru revenue division.

== Demographics ==
As of 2011 Census of India, Somavarappadu has population of 3,015 of which 1,531 are males while 1,484 are females. Sex Ratio of Somavarappadu village is 969. Population of children with age 0-6 is 313 which makes up 10.38% of total population of village with a sex ratio of 830. Literacy rate of Somavarappadu village was 70.2%.
