= Saanigudem =

- Village
- Interactive map of Saanigudem
- Location in Andhra Pradesh, India Saanigudem (India)
- Coordinates: 16.775963°N 81.145618°E
- Country: India
- State: Andhra Pradesh
- District: Eluru
- Mandal: Denduluru

Population (2011)
  - Total: 1,025

Languages
  - Official: Telugu
- Time zone: UTC+05:30 (IST)

Saanigudem is a village in Eluru district of the Indian state of Andhra Pradesh. It is administered under the Eluru revenue division.

== Demographics ==
As of 2011 Census of India, Saanigudem has population of 1025 of which 555 are males while 470 are females. Average Sex Ratio is 847. Population of children with age 0-6 is 87 which makes up 8.49% of total population of village, Child sex ratio is 1071. Literacy rate of the village was 63.65%.
