= Putlacheruvu =

- Village
- Interactive map of Putlacheruvu
- Location in Andhra Pradesh, India Putlacheruvu (India)
- Coordinates: 16.486°N 81.11°E
- Country: India
- State: Andhra Pradesh
- District: Eluru

Languages
  - Official: Telugu
- Time zone: UTC+5:30 (IST)
- Climate: Tropical (Köppen)

Putlacheruvu is a village in the Mandavalli mandal, Elur district, Andhra Pradesh state, India. According to the 2011 census it has a population of 1873 living in 583 households.

== Geography ==
The village of Putlacheruvu is 6 km from Kolleru Lake and consists of three areas: Krishnapuram, Ramapuram, and Putlacheruvu proper. It features a 7.5 acre freshwater lake with a Naandi Foundation water treatment plant (which is a small failure )and a 12-foot tall statue of Y. S. Rajasekhara Reddy at the south end of the lake. There are three large canals off the Krishna River on both ends of the village. One of these is used for drinking water and the other two are sewage canals used for pumping water into the fish tanks. The soil is very rich and suitable for many crops including rice and coconut. The local wildlife includes parrots, sparrows, minas, and black crows. In the evenings and early mornings, snake birds form in large migrations.
