= Challachintalapudi =

- Village
- Interactive map of Challachintalapudi
- Location in Andhra Pradesh, India Challachintalapudi (India)
- Coordinates: 16.8411°N 81.2121°E
- Country: India
- State: Andhra Pradesh
- District: Eluru
- Mandal: Denduluru

Population (2011)
  - Total: 4,539

Languages
  - Official: Telugu
- Time zone: UTC+05:30 (IST)

Challachintalapudi is a village in Eluru district of the Indian state of Andhra Pradesh. It is administered under of Eluru revenue division.

== Demographics ==
As of 2011 Census of India, Challachintalapudi has population of 4539 of which 2268 are males while 2271 are females. Average Sex Ratio is 1001. Population of children with age 0-6 is 422 which makes up 9.30% of total population of village, Child sex ratio is 1110. Literacy rate of the village was 70.97%.
