= Dosapadu, Eluru district =

Dosapadu
- Village
- Interactive map of Dosapadu
- Location in Andhra Pradesh, India Dosapadu (India)
- Coordinates: 16.7394°N 81.2007°E
- Country: India
- State: Andhra Pradesh
- District: Eluru
- Mandal: Denduluru

Population (2011)
  - Total: 1,870

Languages
  - Official: Telugu
- Time zone: UTC+05:30 (IST)

Dosapadu is a village in Eluru district of the Indian state of Andhra Pradesh. It is administered under the Eluru revenue division.

== Demographics ==
As of 2011 Census of India, Dosapadu has population of 1870 of which 908 are males while 962 are females. Average Sex Ratio is 1059. Population of children with age 0-6 is 202 which makes up 10.80% of total population of village, Child sex ratio is 1082. Literacy rate of the village was 73.50%.
