= Vegivadavaram =

Vegiwada
- Village
- Vegiwada
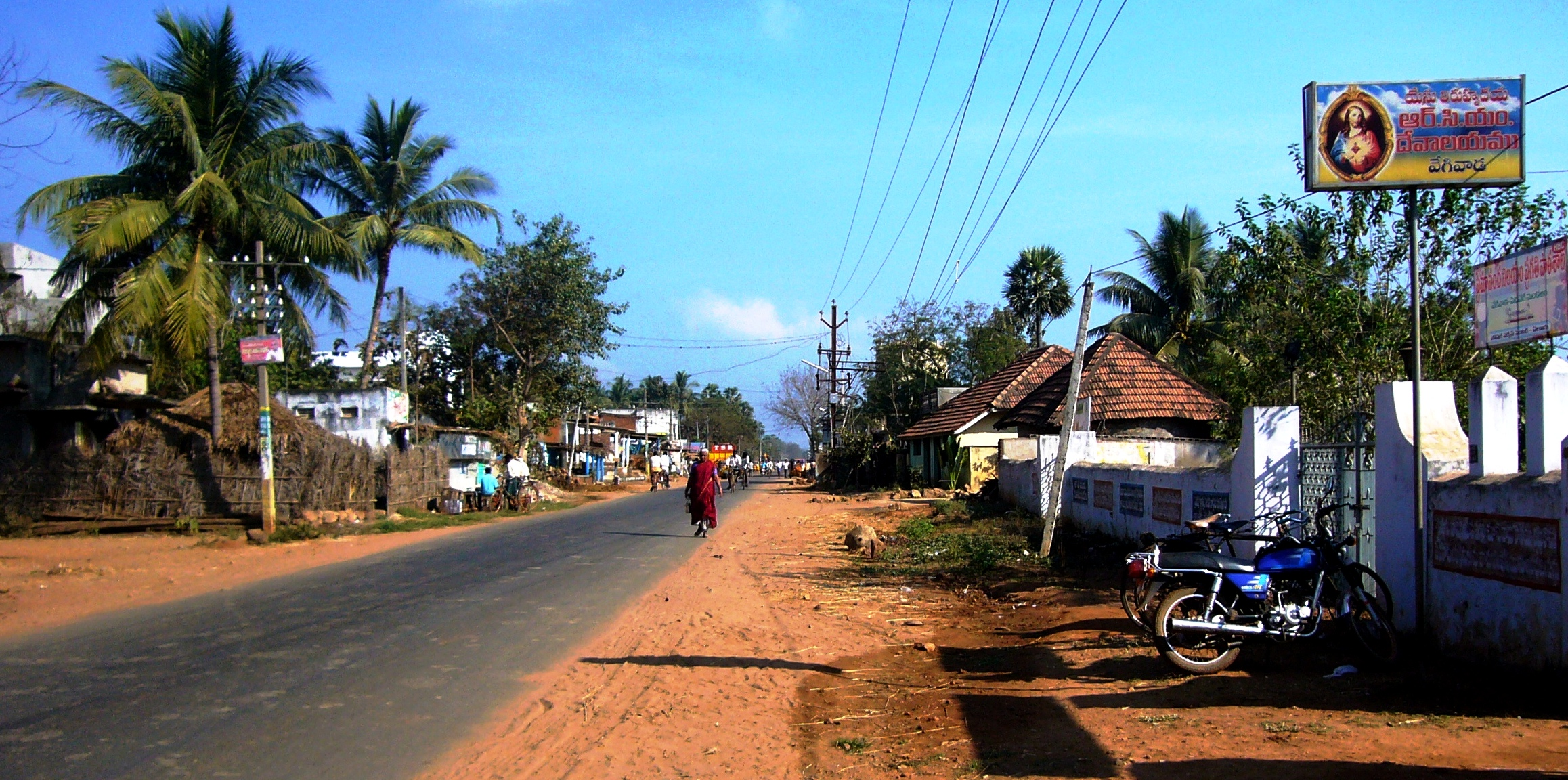
- Main Road in Vegiwada village
- Nickname: Vengi waada (వేంగీవాడ)
- Interactive map of Vegiwada
- Location in Andhra Pradesh, India Vegiwada (India)
- Coordinates: 16.51380°N 81.09357°E
- Country: India
- State: Andhra Pradesh
- District: Eluru
- Mandal: Pedavegi mandal

Area
  - Total: 9.65 km^{2} (3.73 sq mi)
- Elevation: 15 m (49 ft)

Population (2011)
  - Total: 4,763
  - Density: 494/km^{2} (1,280/sq mi)

Languages
  - Official: Telugu
- Time zone: UTC+05:30 (IST)
- Postal code: 534 452

Vegiwada is a village in Eluru district of the Indian state of Andhra Pradesh. It is located in Pedavegi mandal of Eluru revenue division.

== Demographics ==
As of 2011 Census of India, Vegiwada had a population of 4,763. The total population constitute, 2392 males and 2371 females —a sex ratio of 991 females per 1000 males. 485 children are in the age group of 0–6 years, with child sex ratio of 948 girls per 1000 boys. The average literacy rate stands at 70.01% with 2,995 literates.
