= Thimmannagudem =

- Village
- Interactive map of Thimmannagudem
- Location in Andhra Pradesh, India Thimmannagudem (India)
- Coordinates: 16.829951°N 81.223022°E
- Country: India
- State: Andhra Pradesh
- District: Eluru
- Mandal: Denduluru

Population (2011)
  - Total: 779

Languages
  - Official: Telugu
- Time zone: UTC+05:30 (IST)

Thimmannagudem is a village in Eluru district of the Indian state of Andhra Pradesh. It is administered under of Eluru revenue division.

== Demographics ==
As of 2011 Census of India, Thimmannagudem has population of 779 of which 384 are males while 395 are females. Average Sex Ratio is 1029 . Population of children with age 0-6 is 47 which makes up 6.03% of total population of village, Child sex ratio is 1238. Literacy rate of the village was 55.74%.
