= Koppaka =

- Village
- Interactive map of Koppaka
- Location in Andhra Pradesh, India Koppaka (India)
- Coordinates: 16.749446°N 81.031076°E
- Country: India
- State: Andhra Pradesh
- District: Eluru
- Mandal: Pedavegi mandal

Area
  - Total: 27.10 km^{2} (10.46 sq mi)
- Elevation: 12 m (39 ft)

Population (2011)
  - Total: 10,560
  - Density: 389.7/km^{2} (1,009/sq mi)

Languages
  - Official: Telugu
- Time zone: UTC+05:30 (IST)
- Postal code: 534 003

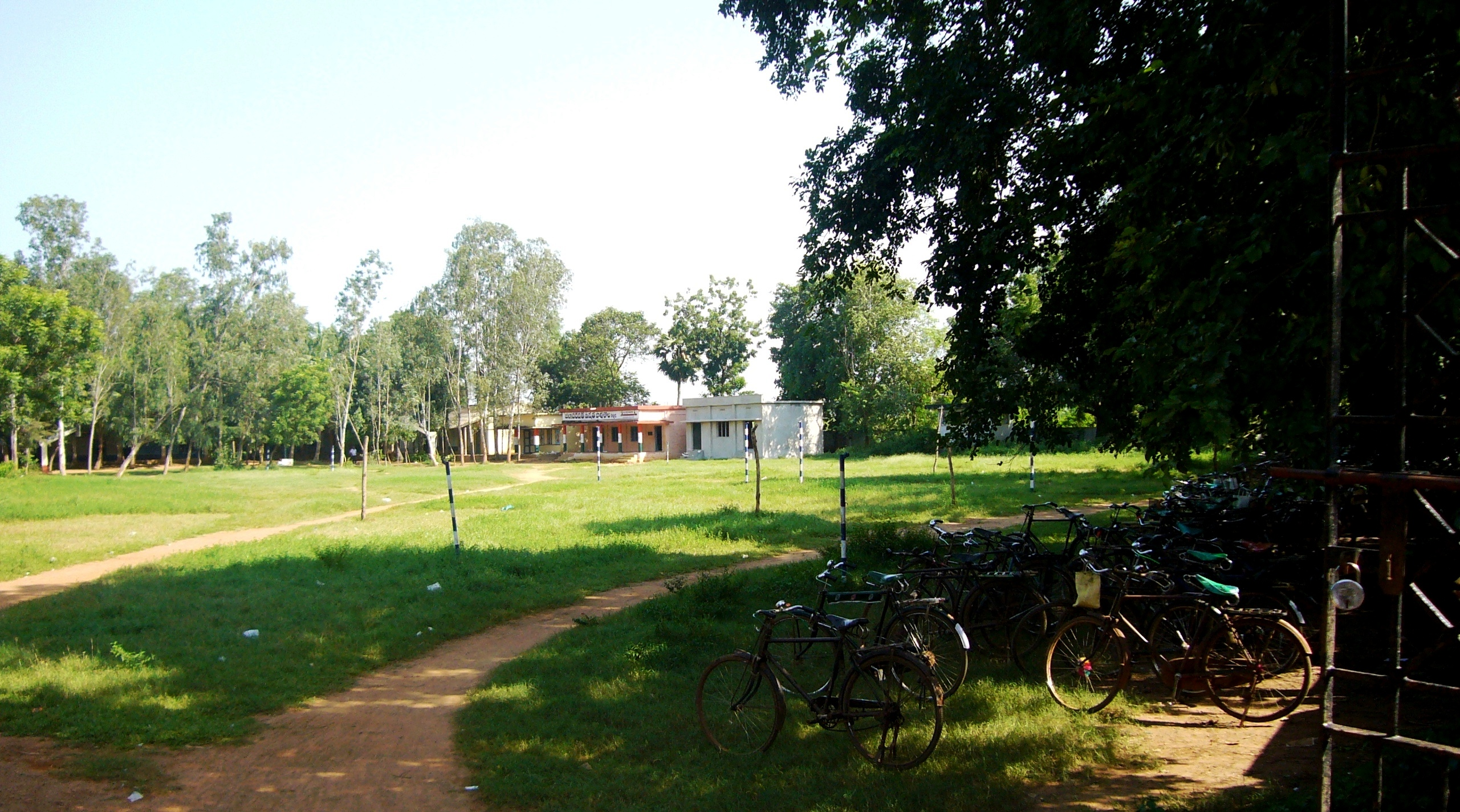

Koppaka is a village in Eluru district of the Indian state of Andhra Pradesh. It is located in Pedavegi mandal of Eluru revenue division.

== Demographics ==
As of 2011 census of India, Koppaka had a population of 10,560. The total population constitutes 5,424 males and 5,136 females —a sex ratio of 947 females per 1000 males. 1,048 children are in the age group of 0–6 years, with child sex ratio of 835 girls per 1000 boys. The average literacy rate stands at 72.91% with 6,935 literates.
