= Naguladevunipadu =

- Village
- Interactive map of Naguladevunipadu
- Location in Andhra Pradesh, India Naguladevunipadu (India)
- Coordinates: 16.831360°N 81.187572°E
- Country: India
- State: Andhra Pradesh
- District: Eluru
- Mandal: Denduluru

Population (2011)
  - Total: 1,485

Languages
  - Official: Telugu
- Time zone: UTC+05:30 (IST)

Naguladevunipadu is a village in Eluru district of the Indian state of Andhra Pradesh. It is administered under of Eluru revenue division.

== Demographics ==
As of 2011 Census of India, Naguladevunipadu has population of 1485 of which 755 are males while 730 are females. Average Sex Ratio is 967. Population of children with age 0-6 is 152 which makes up 10.24% of total population of village, Child sex ratio is 877. Literacy rate of the village was 69.32%.
