= Dondapadu, Eluru district =

Dondapadu
- Village
- Interactive map of Dondapadu
- Location in Andhra Pradesh, India Dondapadu (India)
- Coordinates: 16.7309°N 81.0821°E
- Country: India
- State: Andhra Pradesh
- District: Eluru
- Mandal: Pedavegi mandal
- Elevation: 16 m (52 ft)

Population (2011)
  - Total: 1,950

Languages
  - Official: Telugu
- Time zone: UTC+05:30 (IST)
- Postal code: 534 003

Dondapadu is a village in Eluru district of the Indian state of Andhra Pradesh. It is located in Pedavegi mandal of Eluru revenue division. It is located at a distance of 5 km from district headquarters Eluru city.

== Demographics ==
As of 2011 Census of India, Dondapadu had a population of 1950. The total population constitute, 1011 males and 939 females a sex ratio of 929 females per 1000 males. 169 children are in the age group of 0–6 years, with child sex ratio of 878 girls per 1000 boys. The average literacy rate of the village stands at 90.68%.
