= Komirepalle =

- Village
- Interactive map of Komirepalle
- Location in Andhra Pradesh, India Komirepalle (India)
- Coordinates: 16.7683°N 81.2105°E
- Country: India
- State: Andhra Pradesh
- District: Eluru
- Mandal: Denduluru

Population (2011)
  - Total: 600

Languages
  - Official: Telugu
- Time zone: UTC+05:30 (IST)

Komirepalle is a village in Eluru district of the Indian state of Andhra Pradesh. It is administered under of Eluru revenue division. Sitampet railway station and Denduluru railway station are the nearest train stations.

== Demographics ==
As of 2011 Census of India, Komirepalle has population of 600 of which 304 are males while 296 are females. Average Sex Ratio is 974. Population of children with age 0-6 is 90 which makes up 15.00% of total population of village, Child sex ratio is 915. Literacy rate of the village was 78.63%.
