= Malakacherla =

- Village
- Interactive map of Malakacherla
- Location in Andhra Pradesh, India Malakacherla (India)
- Coordinates: 16.824868°N 81.201273°E
- Country: India
- State: Andhra Pradesh
- District: Eluru
- Mandal: Denduluru

Population (2011)
  - Total: 486

Languages
  - Official: Telugu
- Time zone: UTC+05:30 (IST)

Malakacherla is a village in Eluru district of the Indian state of Andhra Pradesh. It is administered under of Eluru revenue division.

== Demographics ==
As of 2011 Census of India, Malakacherla has population of 486 of which 253 are males while 233 are females. Average Sex Ratio is 921. Population of children with age 0-6 is 39 which makes up 8.02% of total population of village, Child sex ratio is 950. Literacy rate of the village was 74.05%.
