= Medinaraopalem =

- Village
- Interactive map of Medinaraopalem
- Location in Andhra Pradesh, India Medinaraopalem (India)
- Coordinates: 16.831360°N 81.187572°E
- Country: India
- State: Andhra Pradesh
- District: Eluru
- Mandal: Denduluru

Population (2011)
  - Total: 2,611

Languages
  - Official: Telugu
- Time zone: UTC+05:30 (IST)

Medinaraopalem is a village in the Eluru district of the Indian state of Andhra Pradesh. It is administered under the Eluru revenue division.

== Demographics ==
As of 2011 Census of India, Medinaraopalem has population of 2611 of which 1341 are males while 1270 are females. Average Sex Ratio is 947. Population of children with age 0-6 is 253 which makes up 9.69% of total population of village, Child sex ratio is 874. Literacy rate of the village was 65.95%.
