= Kothagudem, Eluru district =

Kothagudem
- Village
- Interactive map of Kothagudem
- Location in Andhra Pradesh, India Kothagudem (India)
- Coordinates: 16.7885°N 81.2133°E
- Country: India
- State: Andhra Pradesh
- District: Eluru
- Mandal: Denduluru

Population (2011)
  - Total: 2,869

Languages
  - Official: Telugu
- Time zone: UTC+05:30 (IST)

Kothagudem is a village in Eluru district of the Indian state of Andhra Pradesh. It is administered under of Eluru revenue division. Sitampet Rail Way Station and Bhimadolu Rail Way Station are the nearest train stations.

== Demographics ==
As of 2011 Census of India, Komirepalle has population of 2869 of which 1431 are males while 1438 are females. Average Sex Ratio is 1005. Population of children with age 0-6 is 313 which makes up 10.91% of total population of village, Child sex ratio is 994. Literacy rate of the village was 78.29%.
