= Ramaraogudem =

- Village
- Interactive map of Ramaraogudem
- Location in Andhra Pradesh, India Ramaraogudem (India)
- Coordinates: 16.827994°N 81.196200°E
- Country: India
- State: Andhra Pradesh
- District: Eluru
- Mandal: Denduluru

Population (2011)
  - Total: 1,793

Languages
  - Official: Telugu
- Time zone: UTC+05:30 (IST)

Ramaraogudem is a village in Eluru district of the Indian state of Andhra Pradesh. It is administered under the Eluru revenue division.

== Demographics ==
As of 2011 according to the Census of India Ramaraogudem had a population of 1793 of which 897 were male and 896 female. The population of children aged under six years was 199 making up 11.10% of the total population. The literacy rate of the village was 79.36%.
