= Kallapalem =

Village in India

- Village
- Interactive map of Kallapalem
- Location within Andhra Pradesh
- Coordinates: 16.5319°N 81.2767°E
- Country: India
- State: Andhra Pradesh
- District: Eluru
- Mandal: Kalidindi
- Time zone: UTC+05:30 (IST)
- Pincode: 521333

Kallapalem is a village in the Kalidindi mandal of Eluru district in Andhra Pradesh, India. It comes under the Kaikaluru assembly constituency and Eluru Parliamentary constituency. The major economy of the village is aqua-agriculture. In 2011, its population was 3,474.
