= Vegavaram =

- Village
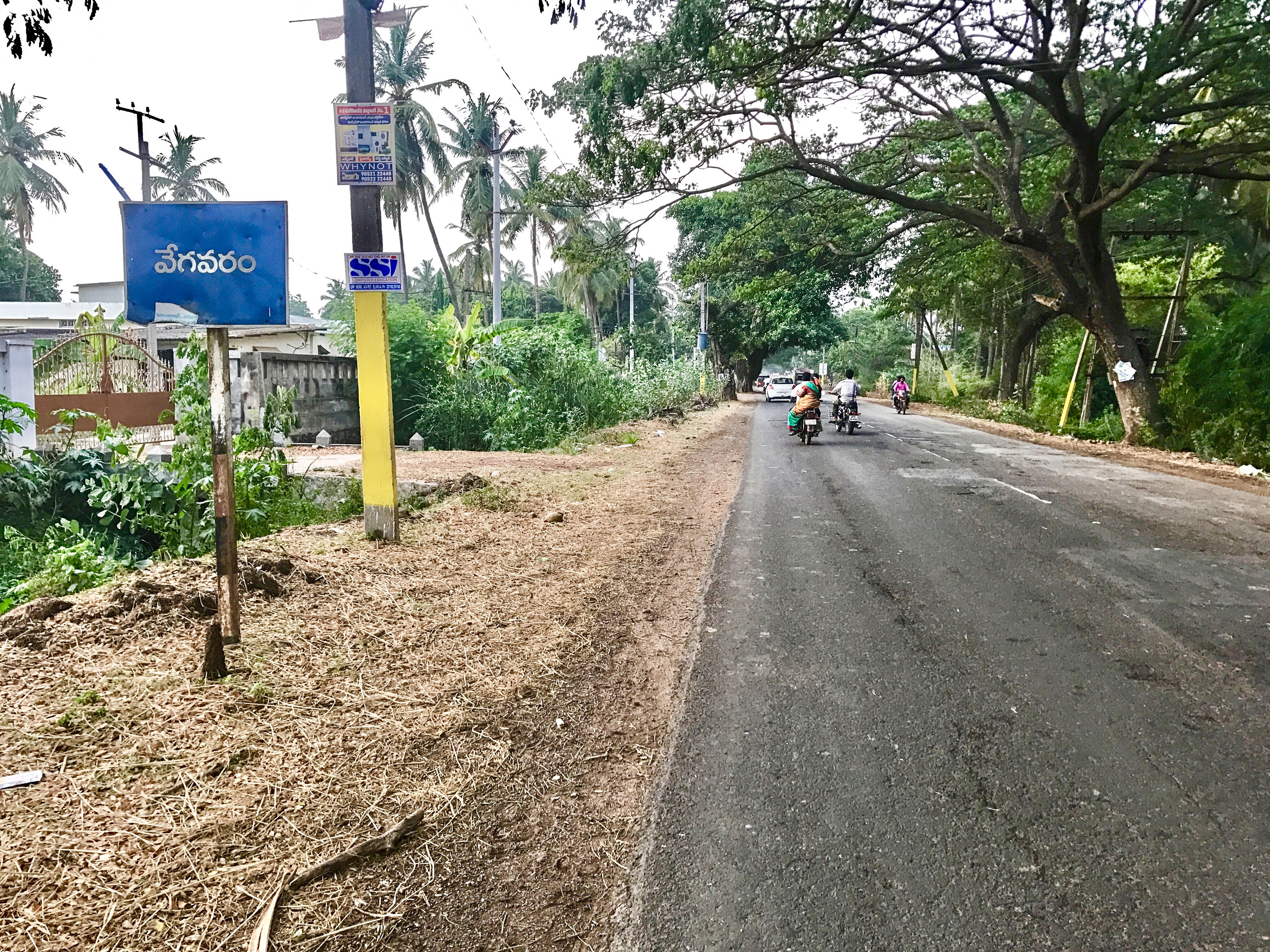
- Vegavaram village board on SH-42
- Interactive map of Vegavaram
- Location in Andhra Pradesh, India Vegavaram (India)
- Coordinates: 16.767253°N 81.120647°E
- Country: India
- State: Andhra Pradesh
- District: Eluru
- Mandal: Denduluru

Population (2011)
  - Total: 2,648

Languages
  - Official: Telugu
- Time zone: UTC+05:30 (IST)

Vegavaram is a village in Eluru district of the Indian state of Andhra Pradesh. It is administered under of Eluru revenue division.

== Demographics ==
As of 2011 Census of India, Vegavaram has population of 2648 of which 1290 are males while 1358 are females. Average Sex Ratio is 1053. Population of children with age 0-6 is 332 which makes up 12.54% of total population of village, Child sex ratio is 107. Literacy rate of the village was 67.44%.
