= Hanumanthunigudem =

- Village
- Interactive map of Hanumanthunigudem
- Location in Andhra Pradesh, India Hanumanthunigudem (India)
- Coordinates: 16.84572°N 80.83501°E
- Country: India
- State: Andhra Pradesh
- District: Eluru
- Mandal: Nuzvid

Area
  - Total: 3.28 km^{2} (1.27 sq mi)

Population (2011)
  - Total: 1,759
  - Density: 536/km^{2} (1,390/sq mi)

Languages
  - Official: Telugu
- Time zone: UTC+5:30 (IST)
- Vehicle registration: AP–16

Hanumanthulagudem is a village in Eluru district in the Indian state of Andhra Pradesh. It is located in Nuzvid mandal of Nuzvid revenue division.
