= Ravicherla =

- Village
- Interactive map of Ravicherla
- Location in Andhra Pradesh, India
- Country: India
- State: Andhra Pradesh

Area
  - Total: 15.36 km^{2} (5.93 sq mi)

Population (2011)
  - Total: 3,572
  - Density: 232.6/km^{2} (602.3/sq mi)

Languages
  - Official: Telugu
- Time zone: UTC+5:30 (IST)
- Vehicle registration: AP

Ravicherla is a village in Eluru district of the Indian state of Andhra Pradesh. It is located in Nuzvid mandal of Nuzvid revenue division.
