= Mundur, Pedavegi mandal =

Mundur
- Village
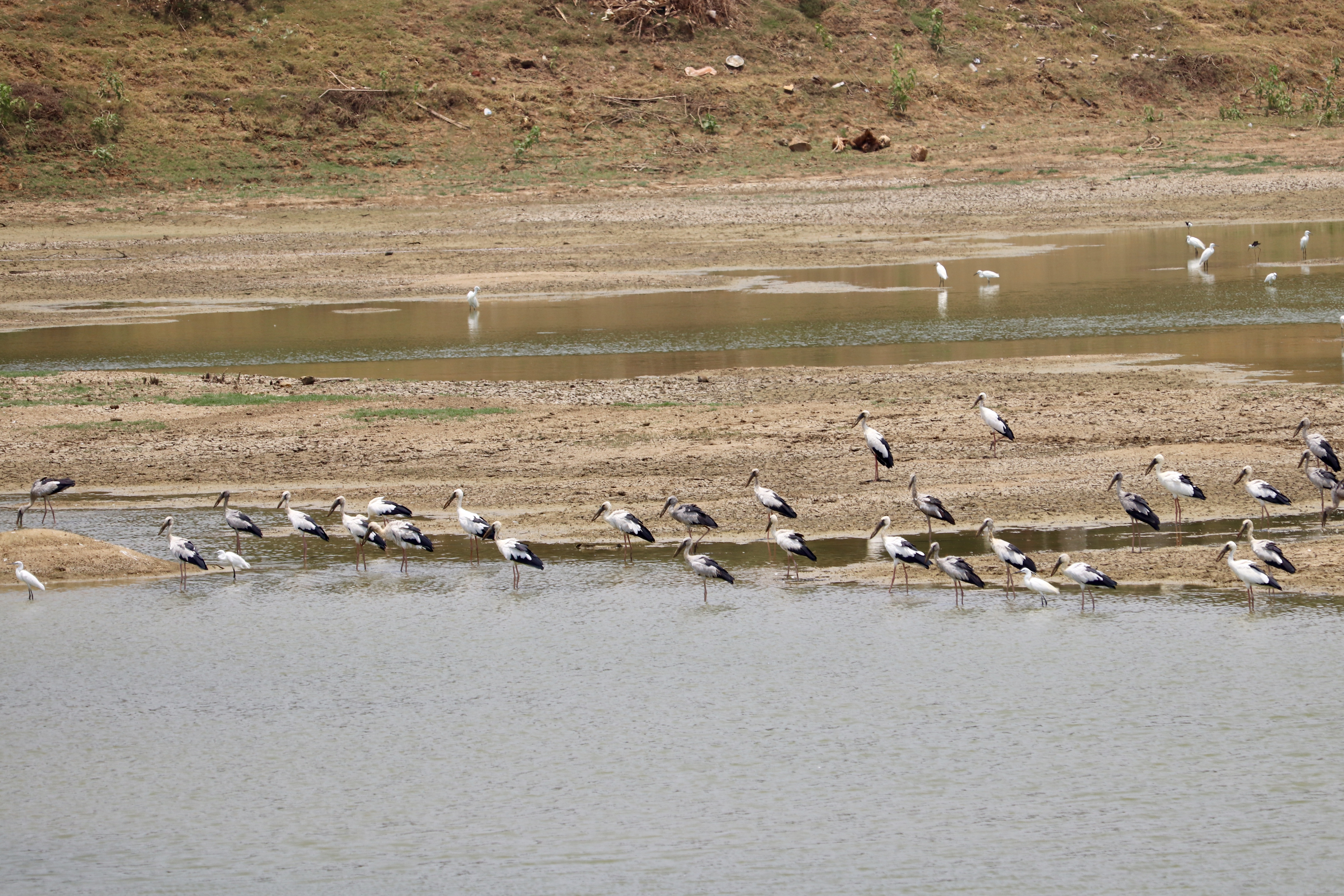
- Egrets in Mundur pond
- Interactive map of Mundur
- Location in Andhra Pradesh, India Mundur (India)
- Coordinates: 16.49533°N 81.09364°E
- Country: India
- State: Andhra Pradesh
- District: Eluru
- Mandal: Pedavegi

Area
  - Total: 11.49 km^{2} (4.44 sq mi)
- Elevation: 16 m (52 ft)

Population (2011)
  - Total: 4,698
  - Density: 408.9/km^{2} (1,059/sq mi)

Languages
  - Official: Telugu
- Time zone: UTC+05:30 (IST)
- Postal code: 534 475

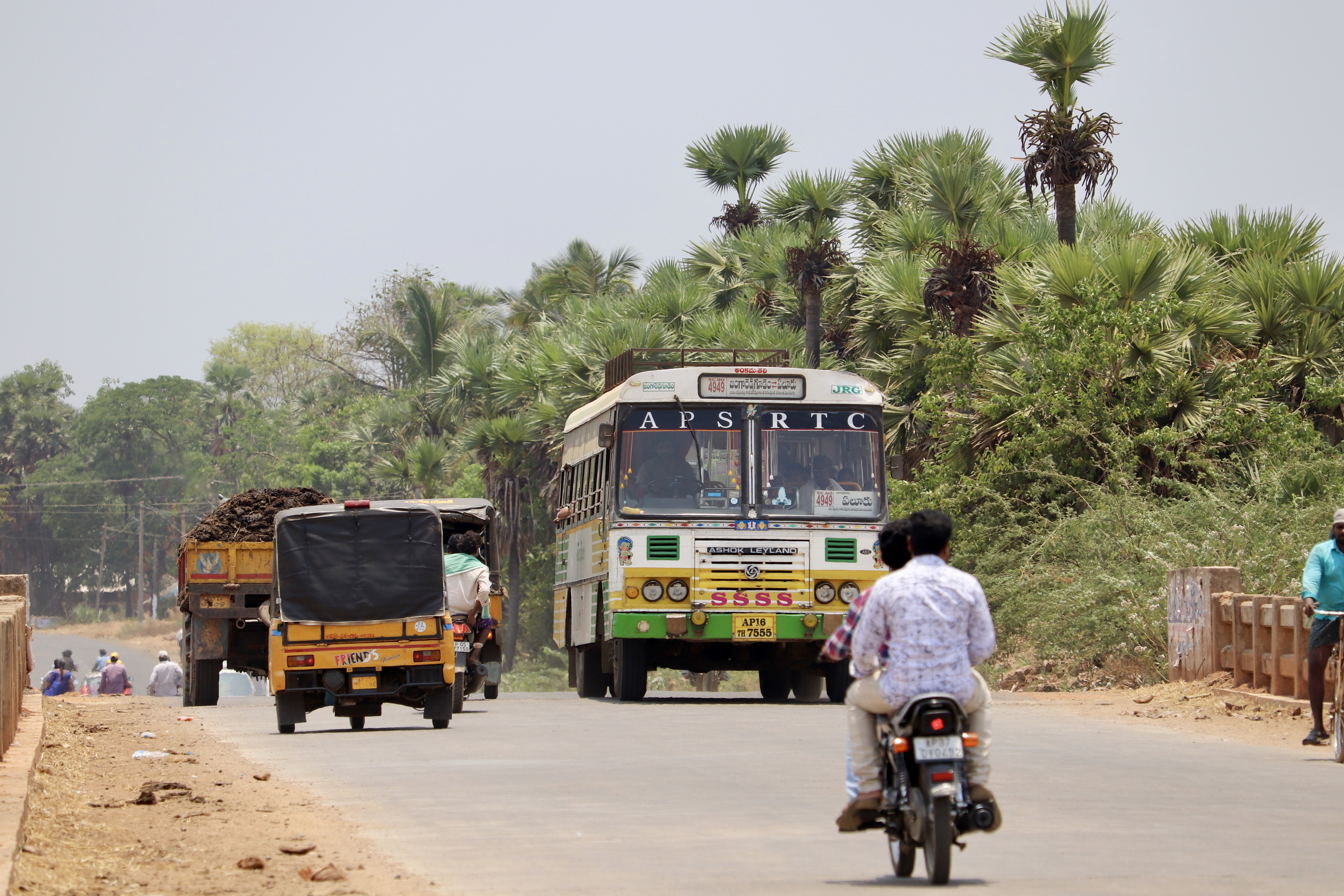
APS RTC bus near Mundur

Mundur is a village in Eluru district of the Indian state of Andhra Pradesh. It is located in Pedavegi mandal of Eluru revenue division.

== Demographics ==
As of 2011 Census of India, Mundur had a population of 4,698. The population comprises 2,357 males and 2,341 females —a sex ratio of 993 females per 1000 males. 516 children are in the age group of 0–6 years, with child sex ratio of 933 girls per 1000 boys. The average literacy rate stands at 64.40% with 2,693 literates.
