= Boravancha =

- Village
- Interactive map of Boravancha
- Location in Andhra Pradesh, India
- Country: India
- State: Andhra Pradesh
- District: Eluru
- Mandal: Nuzvid

Government
  - Type: Gram panchayat

Area
  - Total: 13.04 km^{2} (5.03 sq mi)

Population (2011)
  - Total: 2,687
  - Density: 206.1/km^{2} (533.7/sq mi)

Languages
  - Official: Telugu
- Time zone: UTC+5:30 (IST)
- Area code: 521203
- Vehicle registration: AP

Boravancha is a village in Eluru district of the Indian state of Andhra Pradesh. It is located in Nuzvid mandal under Nuzvid revenue division.
