= Mulalanka =

Mulalanka is a small village in the Kalidindi mandal of Eluru district in Andhra Pradesh, India. Its name used to be Mulaupparagudam. It comes under the Kaikaluru assembly constituency and Eluru Parliamentary constituency.

The main occupation of people in Mulalanka is fish and prawn culture. The village is very famous for its aqua culture and exports to various parts of the country.
