= Mundur =

Mundur may refer to:

- Mundur, Andhra Pradesh, a village in West Godavari district, India
- Mundur, Palakkad, a village in Palakkad district, Kerala, India
- Mundur, Thrissur, a village in Thrissur district, Kerala, India
- Mundur Krishnankutty, an Indian writer from Mundur, Palakkad
