= Rajampalem =

- Village
- Interactive map of Rajampalem
- Coordinates: 16.8482°N 80.9966°E
- Country: India
- State: Andhra Pradesh
- District: Eluru

Population (2011)
  - Total: 10

Languages
  - Official: Telugu
- Time zone: UTC+5:30 (IST)

Rajampalem is a village in Pedavegi mandal in the Indian state of Andhra Pradesh.

== Demographics ==
As of 2011 Census of India, Rajampalem had a population of 10. The total population constitute, 7 males and 3 females with a sex ratio of 3 females per 1000 males. 0 children are in the age group of 0–6 years, with sex ratio of 0 The average literacy rate stands at 90.00%.
