= Pallerlamudi =

- Village
- Interactive map of Pallerlamudi
- Location in Andhra Pradesh, India
- Coordinates: 16.6851°N 80.9837°E
- Country: India
- State: Andhra Pradesh
- District: Eluru
- Mandal: Nuzvid

Area
  - Total: 12.09 km^{2} (4.67 sq mi)

Population (2011)
  - Total: 4,225
  - Density: 349.5/km^{2} (905.1/sq mi)

Languages
  - Official: Telugu
- Time zone: UTC+5:30 (IST)
- PIN: 522307

Pallerlamudi is a village in Eluru district of the Indian state of Andhra Pradesh. It is located in Nuzvid mandal of Nuzvid revenue division.
