= Gollapalli, Eluru district =

Gollapalli
- Village
- Interactive map of Gollapalli
- Location in Andhra Pradesh, India Gollapalli (India)
- Coordinates: 16.7262°N 80.9070°E
- Country: India
- State: Andhra Pradesh
- District: Eluru

Area
  - Total: 5.04 km^{2} (1.95 sq mi)

Population (2011)
  - Total: 5,196
  - Density: 1,030/km^{2} (2,670/sq mi)

Languages
  - Official: Telugu
- Time zone: UTC+5:30 (IST)
- Vehicle registration: AP

Gollapalli is a village in Eluru district of the Indian state of Andhra Pradesh. It is located in Nuzvid mandal under Nuzvid revenue division.

== Notable people ==
- N. S. Prasad (born 1944), scientist, philosopher and author
