= Denduluru mandal =

Coordinates: 16°45′38″N 81°09′51″E

Denduluru Mandal
- Mandal
- Interactive map of Denduluru Mandal
- Country: India
- State: Andhra Pradesh
- District: Eluru

Population (2001)
  - Total: 65,768

Languages
  - Official: Telugu
- Time zone: UTC+5:30 (IST)
- PIN: 534432
- Vehicle registration: AP37
- Nearest city: Eluru
- Lok Sabha constituency: Eluru
- Vidhan Sabha constituency: Denduluru
- Climate: hot (Köppen)

Denduluru is a mandal in Eluru district in the state of Andhra Pradesh in India.

== Demographics ==
According to Indian census, 2001, the demographic details of Denduluru mandal is as follows:

- Total Population: 65,768 in 17,118 Households
- Male Population: 33,098 and Female Population: 32,670
- Children Under 6-years of age: 8,223 (Boys - 4,231 and Girls - 3,992)
- Total Literates: 38,768

== Towns and villages ==
As of 2011 census, the mandal has 26 settlements. Denduluru is the most populated and Uppugudem is the least populated village in the mandal.

The settlements in the mandal are listed below:

1. Akkireddigudem
2. Challachintalapudi
3. Challapalle
4. Denduluru
5. Dosapadu
6. Galayagudem
7. Gopannapalem
8. Gudigunta
9. Komirepalle
10. Kothagudem
11. Kothapalle
12. Kovvali
13. Malakacherla
14. Medinaraopalem
15. Muppavaram (Gandi Vari Gudem)
16. Naguladevunipadu
17. kandriga Narasimhapuram
18. Pothunuru
19. Ramaraogudem
20. Saanigudem
21. Singavaram
22. Somavarappadu
23. Sriramavaram
24. Thimmannagudem
25. Uppugudem
26. Vegavaram
