= Mandavalli =

Coordinates: 16°33′50″N 81°08′59″E

- Village
- Interactive map of Mandavalli
- Country: India
- State: Andhra Pradesh
- District: Eluru
- Mandal: Mandavalli

Population (2011)
  - Total: 4,996

Languages
  - Official: Telugu
- Time zone: UTC+5:30 (IST)
- Lok Sabha constituency: Eluru
- Vidhan Sabha constituency: Kaikaluru

Mandavalli is a village in Eluru district of the Indian state of Andhra Pradesh.

== See also ==
- Villages in Mandavalli mandal
