= Mukkollupadu =

Village in Andhra Pradesh, India

- Village
- Interactive map of Mukkollupadu
- Location within Andhra Pradesh
- Coordinates: 16°49′59″N 80°52′31″E
- Country: India
- State: Andhra Pradesh
- District: Eluru
- Mandal: Nuzvid

Government
  - Type: Gram Panchayat

Area
  - Total: 16.17 km^{2} (6.24 sq mi)
- Elevation: 103 m (338 ft)

Population (2011)
  - Total: 2,632
  - Density: 162.8/km^{2} (421.6/sq mi)
- Demonym: Languages
- Time zone: UTC+5:30 (IST)
- PIN: 521201
- STD code: 08656
- Vehicle registration: AP-39

Mukkollupadu is a village in the Eluru district, Andhra Pradesh, India. It is located in the western portion of the district, about 27 kilometres northwest of the district headquarter Eluru. As of the year 2011, it had a reported population of 2,632.

== Geography ==
Mukkollupadu is situated near the northwestern side of Andhra Pradesh. It covers an area of 1617 hectares.

== Demographics ==
According to the 2011 census of India, there were 654 households within the village. Among the 2,632 residents, 1,342 were male and 1,290 were female. The working population took up 53.84% of the total population. The overall literacy rate was 53.76%, with 753 of the male inhabitants and 662 of the female inhabitants being literate.
