= Krishnavaram =

- Village
- Interactive map of Krishnavaram
- Location in Andhra Pradesh, India Krishnavaram (India)
- Coordinates: 16°39′06″N 80°51′13″E
- Country: India
- State: Andhra Pradesh
- District: Eluru

Area
  - Total: 5.29 km^{2} (2.04 sq mi)

Population (2011)
  - Total: 1,698
  - Density: 321/km^{2} (831/sq mi)

Languages
  - Official: Telugu
- Time zone: UTC+5:30 (IST)

Krishnavaram is a village in Eluru district of the Indian state of Andhra Pradesh. It is located in Agiripalle mandal.
