= K Kothagudem =

- Village
- Interactive map of K Kothagudem
- Location in Andhra Pradesh, India
- Country: India
- State: Andhra Pradesh
- District: Eluru
- Mandal: Chatrai

Area
  - Total: 8.23 km^{2} (3.18 sq mi)

Population (2011)
  - Total: 1,815
  - Density: 221/km^{2} (571/sq mi)

Languages
  - Official: Telugu
- Time zone: UTC+5:30 (IST)

K Kothagudem is a village in Eluru district of the Indian state of Andhra Pradesh. It is located in Chatrai mandal of Nuzvid revenue division.
