= Pedavegi mandal =

- Mandal
- Interactive Map Outlining mandal
- Location in Andhra Pradesh, India
- Coordinates: 16.60°N 81.10°E
- Country: India
- State: Andhra Pradesh
- District: Eluru

Population (2011)
  - Total: 88,852

Languages
  - Official: Telugu
- Time zone: UTC+5:30 (IST)

Pedavegi mandal is one of the 28 mandals in Eluru district of the Indian state of Andhra Pradesh. It is administered under Eluru revenue division and its headquarters are located at Pedavegi. The mandal is bounded by Eluru mandal, Denduluru mandal, Kamavarapukota mandal.

== Towns and villages ==
As of 2011 census, the mandal has 28 settlements. Pedavegi is the most populated and Rajampalem is the least populated village in the mandal.

The settlements in the mandal are listed below:

1. Bapirajugudem
2. Bathevaram
3. Bhogapuram
4. Chakrayagudem
5. Dondapadu
6. Duggirala
7. Gokinepalle
8. Jagannadhapuram
9. K.Kannapuram
10. Kavagunta
11. Kondalaraopalem
12. Koppaka
13. Mundur
14. Muthanaveedu
15. Mylavarapuvarigudem
16. Nadupalle
17. Nyayampalle
18. Pedavegi
19. Pinakadimi
20. Rajampalem
21. Ramasingavaram
22. Rayannapalem
23. Singavaram
24. Seethapuram
25. Tallagokavaram
26. Vanguru
27. Vegivadavaram
28. Vijayarai

== See also ==
- West Godavari district
