= Mattagunta =

- Village
- Interactive map of Mattagunta
- Location in Andhra Pradesh, India Mattagunta (India)
- Coordinates: 16°27′54″N 81°22′06″E
- Country: India
- State: Andhra Pradesh
- District: Eluru
- District: Kalidindi

Area
  - Total: 6.27 km^{2} (2.42 sq mi)
- Elevation: 5 m (16 ft)

Population (2011)
  - Total: 1,926
  - Density: 307/km^{2} (796/sq mi)

Languages
  - Official: Telugu
- Time zone: UTC+5:30 (IST)

Mattagunta is a village now part of Eluru district, Andhra Pradesh, India. It falls under Kalidindi mandal.
