= Kovvali, Eluru district =

Coordinates: 16°44′N 81°10′E

Kovvali
- Village
- Interactive map of Kovvali
- Country: India
- State: Andhra Pradesh
- District: Eluru

Population (2011)
  - Total: 8,925

Languages
  - Official: Telugu
- Time zone: UTC+5:30 (IST)
- PIN: 534442
- Vehicle registration: AP37
- Nearest city: Eluru
- Lok Sabha constituency: Eluru
- Vidhan Sabha constituency: Denduluru
- Climate: hot (Köppen)

Kovvali is a village Denduluru Mandal in Eluru district in the state of Andhra Pradesh in India.

== Demographics ==
As of 2011 Census of India, Kovvali had a population of 8925. The total population constitutes 4391 males and 4534 females with a sex ratio of 1033 females per 1000 males. 842 children are in the age group of 0–6 years, with sex ratio of 1034. The average literacy rate stands at 66.79%.
