= Kondalaraopalem =

- Village
- Interactive map of Kondalaraopalem
- Location within Andhra Pradesh
- Coordinates: 16°51′N 81°03′E
- Country: India
- State: Andhra Pradesh
- District: Eluru
- Mandal: Pedavegi mandal

Area
  - Total: 27.1 km^{2} (10.5 sq mi)
- Elevation: 12 m (39 ft)

Population
  - Total: 1,674
- Time zone: IST (UTC+05:30)

Kondalaraopalem is a village in Eluru district of the Indian state of Andhra Pradesh. It is located in Pedavegi mandal of Eluru revenue division. The nearest railway station is located at Eluru which is more than 10 km from Kondalaraopalem.

== Demographics ==
As of 2011 Census of India, Kondalaraopalem had a population of 1674. The total population constitutes 829 males and 845 females with a sex ratio of 1019 females per 1000 males. 162 children are in the age group of 0–6 years, with sex ratio of 1025. The average literacy rate stands at 62.76%.
