= Kukunoor =

Kukunoor Kukunuru
- Village, City
- Interactive map of Kukunoor
- Location in Andhra Pradesh, India
- Coordinates: 17.5667°N 81.1833°E
- Country: India
- State: Andhra Pradesh
- District: Eluru
- Elevation: 42 m (138 ft)

Population
  - Total: 6,380

Languages
  - Official: Telugu
- Time zone: UTC+5:30 (IST)
- Pincode: 534444
- Vehicle registration: AP 37, AP 39
- Climate: hot (Köppen)

Kukunoor name board ♥️

Kukunoor is a village in Eluru District of the Indian state of Andhra Pradesh. It was in Khammam district, until the formation of Telangana state on 2 June 2014.

== Geography ==
Kukunoor is located at 17.5667°N 81.1833°E. It has an average elevation of 29 metres (98 ft).

== Demographics ==
As of 2011 Census of India, Kukunoor had a population of 6380. The total population constitute, 3176 males and 3204 females with a sex ratio of 1009 females per 1000 males. 539 children are in the age group of 0–6 years, with sex ratio of 918. The average literacy rate stands at 64.42%.

== Transport ==
Bhadrachalam to Rajahmundry buses passes through the town. Nearest airport is Rajahmundry Airport.Nearest railway station is Bhadrachalam Road railway station located in Kothagudem.
