= Lingapalem =

Coordinates: 16°57′01″N 80°59′23″E

- Village
- Nickname: LP
- Interactive map of Lingapalem
- Country: India
- State: Andhra Pradesh
- District: Eluru

Languages
  - Official: Telugu
- Time zone: UTC+5:30 (IST)
- Vehicle registration: AP

Lingapalem is a village in Eluru district of the Indian state of Andhra Pradesh. The nearest railway station is at Eluru (EE) located at a distance of 28.1 Km.

== Demographics ==
According to Indian census, 2011, the demographic details of Lingapalem is as follows:

- Total Population: 2934 in 755 Households
- Male Population: 1488 and Female Population: 1446 (Sex ratio - 972)
- Children Under 6-years of age: 320 (Sex ratio - 882)
- Literacy rate: 68.36 %
