= Yerrakaluva =

River in India

Coordinates: 16°44′N 81°05′E

Yerrakaluvaa is a river that forms boundary between Khammam district of Telangana and Eluru district of Andhra Pradesh.

The area is often affected by floods. Many villages every year lose their crops to floods and many families lose everything.

This river and nearby Kolleru lake drain into the Upputeru river before joining the Bay of Bengal near Mogultur in the Eluru district. Yerrakalva passes near Konguvarigudem village in Jangareddigudem mandal of Eluru district.

== Yerra Kaluva reservoir ==
Yerra Kaluva Reservoir was constructed in 1976. The Yerrakalva Reservoir Project consisted of an earthen dam formed across the river.

The ayacut proposed to be irrigated by this project is 9,996 ha benefiting 22 villages in Jangareddigudem, Kamavarapukota, Dwaraka Tirumala, Nallajerla and Tadepalligudem mandals. Flood moderation is provided for safeguarding about 8,094 ha of fertile lands between Anantapalli and Nandamuru Aqueduct. The project components are:

- Earthen Dam for a length of 2.73 km.
- Spillway Regulator with Hoist Bridge with 4 Vents of size 12.00 m. x 5.00 m
- Left and Right Head Sluices at km.0.40 and km.2.20 of Earth Dam respectively.
- Excavation of Left Main Canal (LMC) for a length of 7.59 km. and Right Main Canal (RMC) for a length of 45.60 km. including their distributary network and CM&CD works.

The contemplated protected lands under this project included 9,996 ha. 2,023 ha on the left main canal and 1,012 ha on the right. Up to 2.18 km of the right main canal were provided as irrigation facilities prior to AIBP assistance. As of March 2010 the irrigation potential was 8095 ha from Kongulagudem project to Nandamuru Aqueduct

== See also ==
- Budameru
