= Chatrai =

Chatrai Chaturaye
- Village
- Interactive map of Chatrai
- Location in Andhra Pradesh, India
- Coordinates: 16°59′36″N 80°51′47″E
- Country: India
- State: Andhra Pradesh
- District: Eluru
- Mandal: Chatrai

Area
  - Total: 21.05 km^{2} (8.13 sq mi)

Population (2011)
  - Total: 4,613
  - Density: 219.1/km^{2} (567.6/sq mi)

Languages
  - Official: Telugu
- Time zone: UTC+5:30 (IST)
- PIN: 521214
- Vehicle registration: AP

Chatrai is a village in Eluru district of the Indian state of Andhra Pradesh. It is located in Chatrai mandal of Nuzvid revenue division.
