= Kalidindi =

- Village
- Interactive map of Kalidindi
- Location in Andhra Pradesh, India Kalidindi (India)
- Coordinates: 16.503167°N 81.28767°E
- Country: India
- State: Andhra Pradesh
- District: Eluru
- Mandal: Kalidindi

Area
  - Total: 35.82 km^{2} (13.83 sq mi)
- Elevation: 5 m (16 ft)

Population (2011)
  - Total: 18,059
  - Density: 504.2/km^{2} (1,306/sq mi)

Languages
  - Official: Telugu
- Time zone: UTC+5:30 (IST)
- PIN: 521 344
- Vehicle registration: AP 16
- Lok Sabha constituency: Eluru
- Vidhan Sabha constituency: Kaikalur

Kalidindi is a village located in the Eluru district of the Indian state of Andhra Pradesh. The village is renowned for its advanced techniques in aqua agriculture. It's been a fort city and an adjacent village Kota Kalidindi suggests the same.

At one point, Raja Raja narendra designated Kalidindi as a temporary capital for his kingdom. There are famous temples in Kalidindi which have great history.

== Geography ==
Kalidindi is located 83 km from Vijayawada, 38 km from Gudivada, 27 km from Bhimavaram (West Godavari district) and 12 km from Kaikaluru.
