= Denduluru =

Village in Eluru (Andhra Pradesh), India

- Village
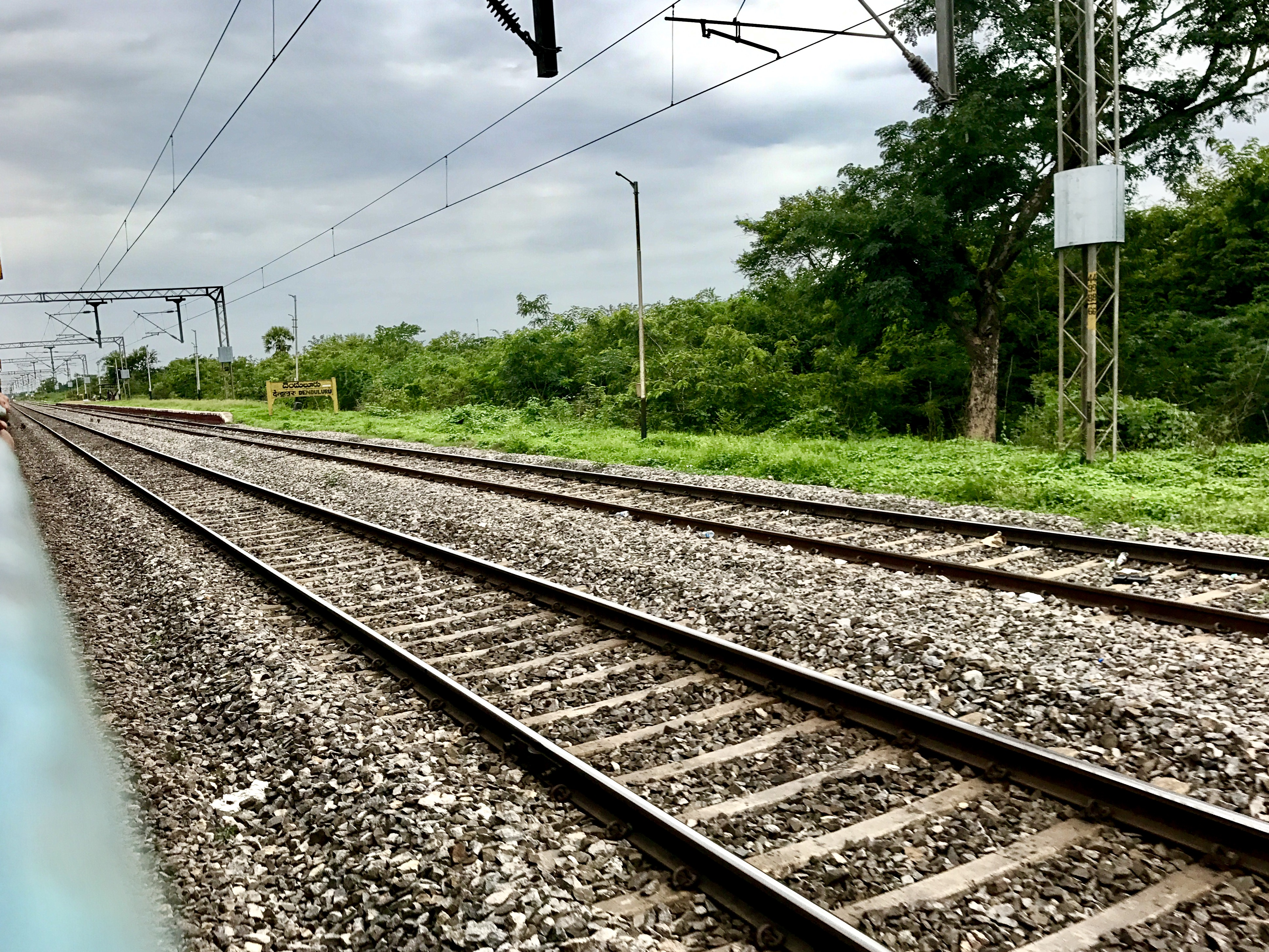
- Denduluru railway station signboard
- Interactive map of Denduluru
- Location in Andhra Pradesh, India Denduluru (India)
- Coordinates: 16.45272°N 81.09511°E
- Country: India
- State: Andhra Pradesh
- District: Eluru
- Mandal: Denduluru

Area
  - Total: 1.64 km^{2} (0.63 sq mi)
- Elevation: 16 m (52 ft)

Population (2011)
  - Total: 11,846
  - Density: 7,220/km^{2} (18,700/sq mi)

Languages
  - Official: Telugu
- Time zone: UTC+05:30 (IST)
- Postal code: 534 432
- Vehicle registration: AP

Denduluru is a village in the Eluru district of the Indian state of Andhra Pradesh.And the ruling MLA is Chintamaneni Prabhakar. It is located on the north-east side of district headquarters Eluru at a distance of 11 km. It is a member of the Eluru revenue division. The Bhimalingadibba or the mounds are one of the centrally protected monuments of national importance.

== Demographics ==
As of the 2011 Census of India, Denduluru has 3405 families residing of population of 11846 of which 5923 are males while 5923 are females. It has 1166 children with age 0-6 which makes up 9.84% of total population of village. The Average Sex Ratio is 1000, which is higher than the Andhra Pradesh state average of 993. The Child Sex Ratio is 902, lower than Andhra Pradesh average of 939. The literacy rate is 72.65%, compared to 67.02% of Andhra Pradesh, with the male literacy rate standing at 77.01%, while the female literacy rate stands at 68.34%.

== Transport ==
APSRTC runs buses from Eluru and Dwarakatirumala. Denduluru railway station is the nearest railway station which serves the village.
