= Buttayagudem mandal =

Coordinates: 17.203°N 81.320°E

- Mandal
- Interactive map of Buttayagudem mandal
- Location in Andhra Pradesh, India
- Country: India
- State: Andhra Pradesh
- District: Eluru

Population
  - Total: 53,031 (2,011)

Languages
  - Official: Telugu
- Time zone: UTC+5:30 (IST)

Buttayagudem mandal is one of the 28 mandals in the Eluru district of the Indian state of Andhra Pradesh. It is administered under the Jangareddygudem revenue division.
