= Koyyalagudem mandal =

Koyyalagudem
- Interactive map of Koyyalagudem
- Location in Andhra Pradesh, India Koyyalagudem (India)
- Coordinates: 17.1167°N 81.3°E
- Country: India
- State: Andhra Pradesh
- District: Eluru
- Talukas: Koyyalagudem
- Elevation: 74 m (243 ft)

Languages
  - Official: Telugu
- Time zone: UTC+5:30 (IST)
- PIN: 534312
- Telephone code: 08821
- Vehicle registration: AP 37

Koyyalagudem mandal is one of the 28 mandals in the Eluru district of the Indian state of Andhra Pradesh. It is administered under the Jangareddygudem revenue division Koyyalagudem comes under Polavaram (ST) (Assembly constituency) and Eluru (Lok Sabha constituency). Koyyalagudem is 49 km away from Rajahmundry, 67 km away from Eluru, the district headquarters.

Villages:

1) Bayyanagudem Koyyalagudem Population = 9,398

2) Chopparamannagudem Koyyalagudem Population = 1,437

3) Dippakayalapadu Koyyalagudem Population = 5,408

4) Eduvadalapalem Koyyalagudem Population = 1,228

5) Gavaravaram Koyyalagudem Population = 4,141

6) Kanakadripuram Koyyalagudem Population = 361

7) Kannapuram Koyyalagudem Population = 5,977

8) Kannayagudem Koyyalagudem Population = 778

9) Kuntalagudem Koyyalagudem Population = 905

10) Mahadevapuram Koyyalagudem Population = 99

11) Mangapathidevipeta Population = Koyyalagudem 2,244

12) koyyalagudem Koyyalagudem Population = 22,300

13) Ponguturu Koyyalagudem Population = 9,298

14) Rajavaram Koyyalagudem Population = 6,443

15) Ramanujapuram Koyyalagudem Population = 2079

16) Saripalle Koyyalagudem Population = 3,521

17) Vedanthapuram Koyyalagudem Population = 2,149

18) Yerrampeta Koyyalagudem Population = 3,496
