= Nuzvid mandal =

- Mandal
- Interactive Map Outlining mandal
- Location in Andhra Pradesh, India
- Coordinates: 16.78°N 80.85°E
- Country: India
- State: Andhra Pradesh
- District: Eluru
- Headquarters: Nuzvid

Languages
  - Official: Telugu
- Time zone: UTC+5:30 (IST)
- Vehicle registration: AP 16

Nuzvid mandal is one of the 28 mandals in Eluru district of the Indian state of Andhra Pradesh. It is under the administration of Nuzvid revenue division, with headquarters at Nuzvid. MLA Name =Sree Kolusu Pardhasaradhi (TDP) | MPDO = Sree C. Raghavendra Nath(9100084664) The mandal is bounded by Reddigudem, Vissannapeta, Chatrai, Mylavaram Agiripalli, Bapulapadu and Musunuru mandals.

== Administration ==
The mandal is partially a part of the Andhra Pradesh Capital Region under the jurisdiction of APCRDA.

== Settlements ==
Nuzvid mandal consists of 29 villages. The following are the list of villages in the mandal:

Mandal Parishad Development Officer (Block Development Officer) Name = Chenna.Raghavendra Nath MPDPO Mobile No: 9100084664

As Per 11 Sensus Population: 70963 ST: M.1881 F. 1834 SC: M.10190 F. 9941 Others: M.23813 F. 23304

1. Annavaram
2. Bathulavarigudem
3. Boravancha
4. Devaragunta
5. Digavalli
6. East Digavalli
7. Enamadala
8. Gollapalle
9. Hanumanthunigudem
10. Jangamgudem
11. Marribandam
12. Meerjapuram
13. Mokhasa Narasannapalem
14. Morsapudi
15. Mukkollupadu
16. Narsupet
17. Nuzvid (M)
18. Pallerlamudi
19. Polasanapalle
20. Pothureddipalle
21. Ramannagudem
22. Ravicherla
23. Seetarampuram
24. Sunkollu
25. Thukkuluru
26. Vempadu
27. Mittagudem
28. Ramannagudem
29. Kothuru Thanda
30. Ogirala Thanda
31. Venkatayapalem

Note:(M):Municipality

Sources:

- Census India 2011 (sub districts)
- Revenue Department of AP
