= Jeelugu Milli mandal =

Coordinates: 17.211°N 81.134°E

- Mandal
- Interactive map of Jeelugu Milli mandal
- Location in Andhra Pradesh, India
- Country: India
- State: Andhra Pradesh
- District: Eluru

Languages
  - Official: Telugu
- Time zone: UTC+5:30 (IST)

Jeelugu Milli mandal is one of the 28 mandals in the Eluru district of the Indian state of Andhra Pradesh. It is administered under the Kovvur revenue division.
