= Velairpadu mandal =

Coordinates: 17°38′20″N 81°24′16″E

Velairpadu
- Mandal
- Interactive map of Velairpadu
- Country: India
- State: Andhra Pradesh
- District: Eluru

Languages
  - Official: Telugu
- Time zone: UTC+5:30 (IST)
- PIN: 534444
- Vehicle registration: AP-37

Velairpadu mandal also spelled as Velerupadu is located in the Eluru district of the Indian state of Andhra Pradesh. Previously, Velairpadu was part of the Khammam district in the then united Andhra Pradesh. However, it became part of Andhra Pradesh following the transfer of seven mandals, including Velairpadu, from Telangana to the newly formed Andhra Pradesh after bifurcation.

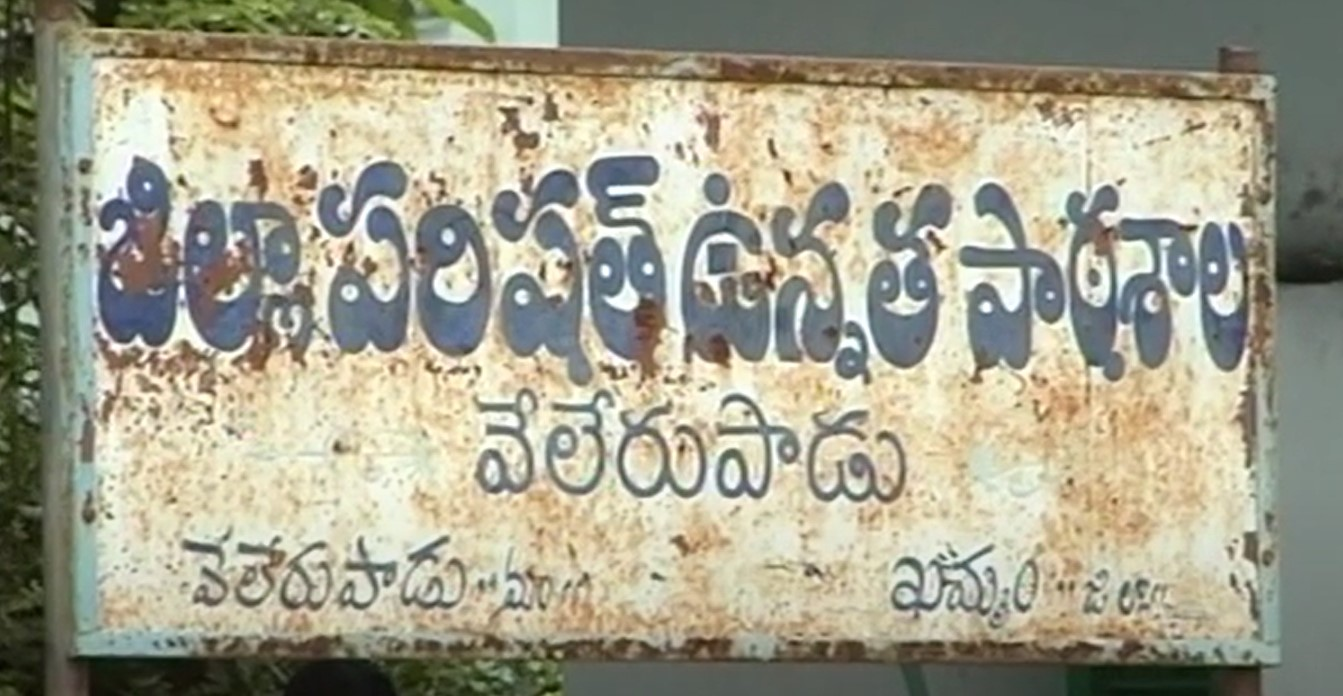

== Velairpadu mandal villages ==
1. Chigurumamidi
2. Gundlavai
3. Kacharam
4. Kakisnoor
5. Katukur
6. Koida
7. Kothuru
8. Koyamadaram
9. Lachapeta
10. Medapalle
11. Narlavaram
12. Parentapalle
13. Rallapudi
14. Ramavaram
15. Repakagommu
16. Rudramkota
17. Siddaram
18. Tekupalle
19. Tekuru
20. Thatukur
21. Tirumalapuram
