= Kalidindi mandal =

Kalidindi
- Mandal
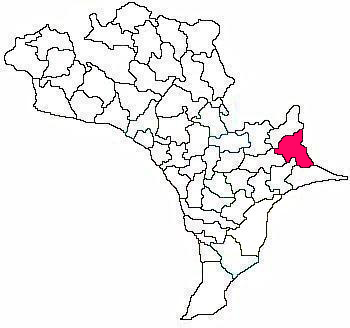
- Mandal map of Krishna district showing Kalidindi mandal (in Rose Colour)
- Interactive map of Kalidindi
- Location in Andhra Pradesh, India
- Coordinates: 16.503167°N 81.28767°E
- Country: India
- State: Andhra Pradesh
- District: Eluru
- Headquarters: Kalidindi

Government
  - Body: Mandal Parishad

Area
  - Total: 178.15 km^{2} (68.78 sq mi)

Population (2011)
  - Total: 70,729
  - Density: 397.02/km^{2} (1,028.3/sq mi)

Languages
  - Official: Telugu
- Time zone: UTC+5:30 (IST)
- Vehicle registration: AP 16

Kalidindi mandal is one of the 28 mandals in Eluru district of the Indian state of Andhra Pradesh. The headquarters of this mandal is located at Kalidindi town. The mandal is bordered by Kalidindi mandal to the north, West Godavari district to the east, Kruthivennu mandal to the south, and Bantumilli mandal to the west.

== Demographics ==
As of the 2010 census, the mandal has a population of 70,729 living in 19,894 households. The total population constituted 35,364 males and 35,365 females, for a sex ratio of 1000 females per 1000 males. There were 6,623 children between the ages of 0–6 years, of which 3,394 were boys and 3,229 were girls. The average literacy rate stands at 68% with 43,594 literates, of which 22,977 are males and 20,617 are females. There were 6,136 members of Scheduled Castes and 521 members of Scheduled Tribes.

=== Labor statistics ===
According to a report published by the Census of India in 2011, 32,438 people were actively engaged in work activities, including 21,378 males and 11,060 females. In the census, 18,000 workers describe their work as main work, 2,382 as cultivators, 10,226 as agricultural labourers, 316 work in household industry and 5,076 were involved in other vocations. Of these, 14,438 were marginal workers.

== Administration ==
Kalidindi mandal is under the Kaikalur Assembly constituency of the Eluru Lok Sabha constituency. It is one of the fifteen mandals that falls under Gudivada revenue division.

== Towns and villages ==
As of 2011 census, there are a total of 20 settlements in the mandal region. Kalidindi is the largest and Kotcherla is the smallest in terms of population. The settlements in the mandal are:

1. Amaravathi
2. Avakuru
3. Bhaskararao Peta
4. Gopalapuram
5. Kalidindi
6. Kallapalem
7. Kondangi
8. Konduru
9. Korukollu
10. Kotcherla
11. Lodida Lanka
12. Mattagunta
13. Mula Lanka
14. Padamatipalem
15. Pedalanka
16. Pothumarru
17. Sana Rudravaram
18. SRP Agraharam
19. santhosapuram
20. Thadinada
21. Venkatapuram

== Education ==
The mandal plays a major role in the education of the rural students of neighboring villages. The primary and secondary school education is managed by the government, and aided by private schools, under the School Education Department of the state. According to the school information report for the academic year 2015–2016, the Mandal has more than 7,990 students enrolled in over 94 schools.

== See also ==
- List of mandals in Andhra Pradesh
- Vijayawada
