= Kotcherla =

Village in Andhra Pradesh, India

- Village
- Interactive map of Kotcherla
- Location in Andhra Pradesh, India
- Coordinates: 16°07′N 79°45′E
- Country: India
- State: Andhra Pradesh
- District: Palnadu
- Mandal: Ipur

Government
  - Type: Panchayati raj
  - Body: Kotcherla gram panchayat

Area
  - Total: 2,125 ha (5,250 acres)

Population (2011)
  - Total: 6,338
  - Density: 298.3/km^{2} (772.5/sq mi)

Languages
  - Official: Telugu
- Time zone: UTC+5:30 (IST)
- PIN: 522647
- Area code: +91–8646
- Vehicle registration: AP -07

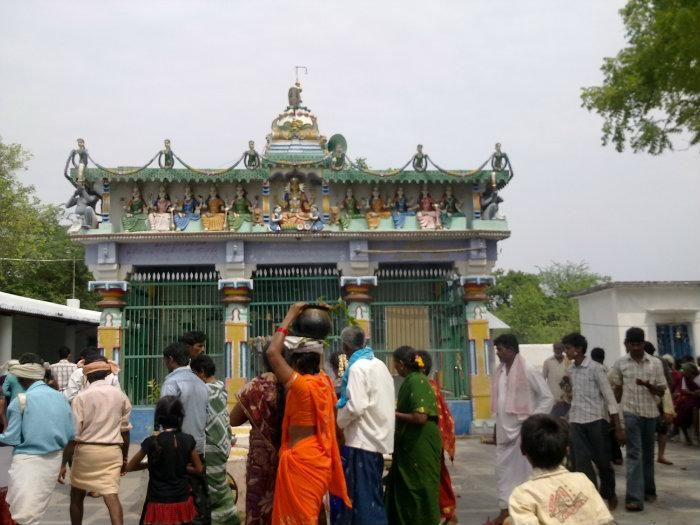
A temple in Kotcherla

Kotcherla is a village in Palnadu district of the Indian state of Andhra Pradesh. It is located in Ipur mandal of Narasaraopet revenue division.

== Geography ==
Kotcherla is situated to the south of the mandal headquarters, Ipur, at 16.05°N 79.75°E. It is spread over an area of 2,125 ha (5,250 acres).

== Government and politics ==
Kotcherlaa gram panchayat is the local self-government of the village. It is divided into wards and each ward is represented by a ward member.

Kotcherla falls under Vinukonda assembly constituency and Narasaraopet lok sabha constituency.

== Education ==
As per the school information report for the academic year 2018–19, the village has 7 Zilla/Mandal Parishad schools.

== See also ==
- Ipur
- Palnadu district
- Narasaraopet revenue division
- Vinukonda Assembly constituency
- Narasaraopet Lok Sabha constituency
