= Jangareddygudem mandal =

- Mandal
- Interactive map of Jangareddygudem mandal
- Country: India
- State: Andhra Pradesh
- District: Eluru

Population (2011)
  - Total: 109 814

Languages
  - Official: Telugu
- Time zone: UTC+5:30 (IST)
- PIN: 534 4xx
- Vehicle registration: AP–37
- Climate: hot (Köppen)

Jangareddygudem is a mandal in Eluru district in the state of Andhra Pradesh in India.

Jangareddygudem is traditionally believed to be named after Kasara Janga Reddy, a local Reddy chieftain or settlement leader associated with the earliest known development of the area. Local oral traditions trace the origins of the settlement to around the 14th century, when forest-fringe habitations began emerging in the region following the decline of Kakatiya authority. The name “Jangareddygudem” is derived from “Janga Reddy” + “gudem” (settlement), meaning “the settlement of Janga Reddy.” While this tradition is widely preserved locally, detailed contemporary historical records are limited.

== Demographics ==
According to Indian census, total population of Jangareddygudem Mandal is 109,814 living in 29,820 Houses, it has villages. Of which Males are 54,682 and Females are 55,132.

== Towns and villages ==
As of 2011 census, the mandal has villages. The settlements in the mandal are listed below:
