= Singavaram =

- Village
- Interactive map of Singavaram
- Location in Andhra Pradesh, India
- Coordinates: 16.8845391°N 81.6576147°E
- Country: India
- State: Andhra Pradesh
- District: East Godavari

Languages
  - Official: Telugu
- Time zone: UTC+5:30 (IST)

Singavaram is a village in Nidadavolu mandal, East Godavari district of the Indian state of Andhra Pradesh.
