= Eluru revenue division =

Coordinates: 16.7°N 81.1°E

- revenue division in Eluru district
- Interactive map of Eluru revenue division
- Country: India
- State: Andhra Pradesh
- District: Eluru

Area
  - Total: 3,320.77 km^{2} (1,282.16 sq mi)

Eluru revenue division (or Eluru division) is an administrative division in the Eluru district of the Indian state of Andhra Pradesh. It is one of the 3 revenue divisions in the district. Eluru city is the divisional headquarters. The present sixteen mandals became part of the division on 25 May 1985.

== Demographics ==
As of 2011 census, the division has a total population of 1,471,367. It includes, 735,180 males and 736,187 females. The total urban population in the division is 318,095.

== Administration ==
The division comprise 373 revenue villages, 342 gram panchayats and two municipalities of Eluru and Tadepalligudem.

The mandals administered under Eluru revenue division are:

1. Bhimadole
2. Denduluru
3. Eluru
4. Kaikalur
5. Kalidindi
6. Mandavalli
7. Mudinepalli
8. Nidamarru
9. Pedapadu
10. Pedavegi

== See also ==
- List of revenue divisions in Andhra Pradesh
- List of mandals in Andhra Pradesh
