= Eluru district =

Eluru District
- District
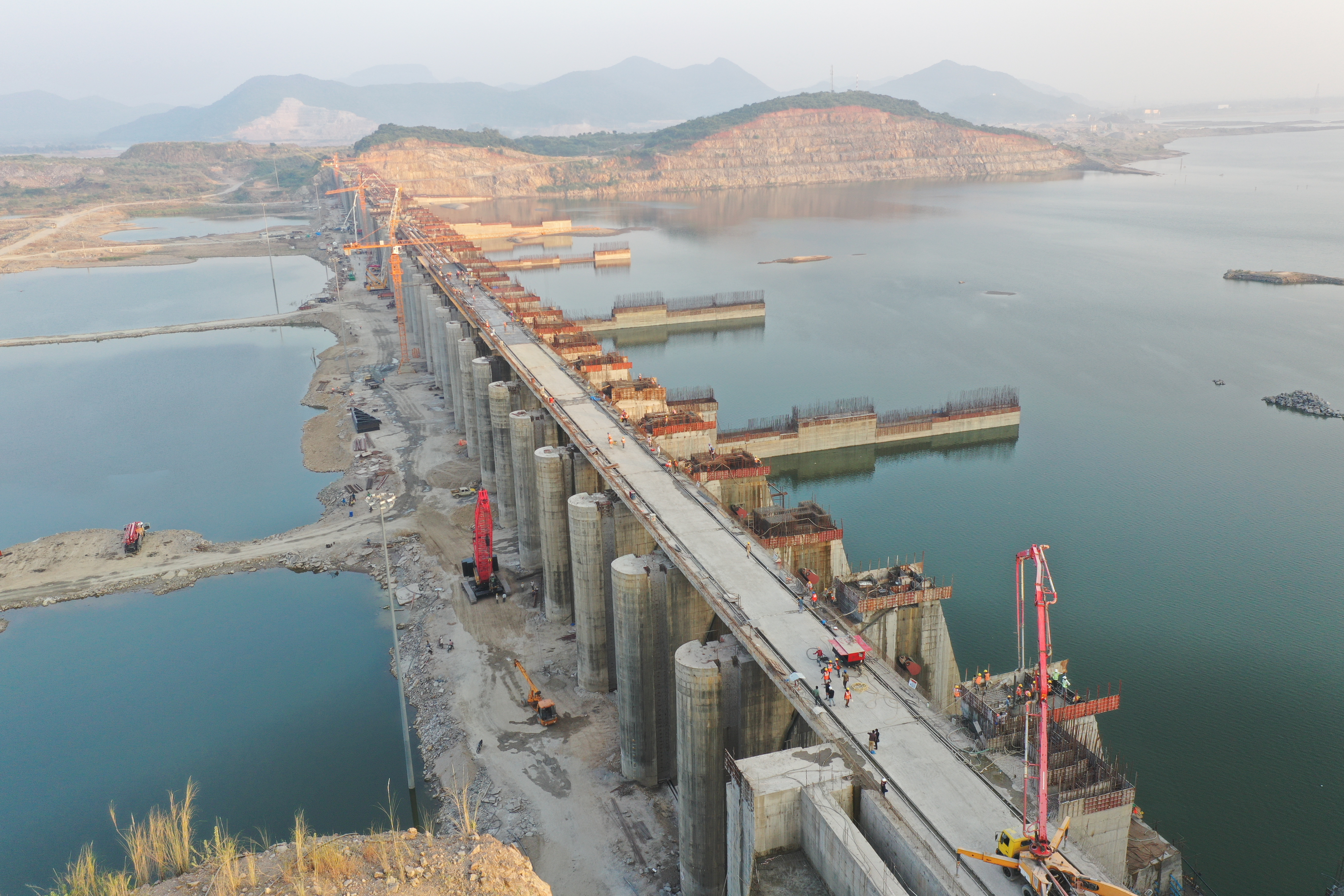
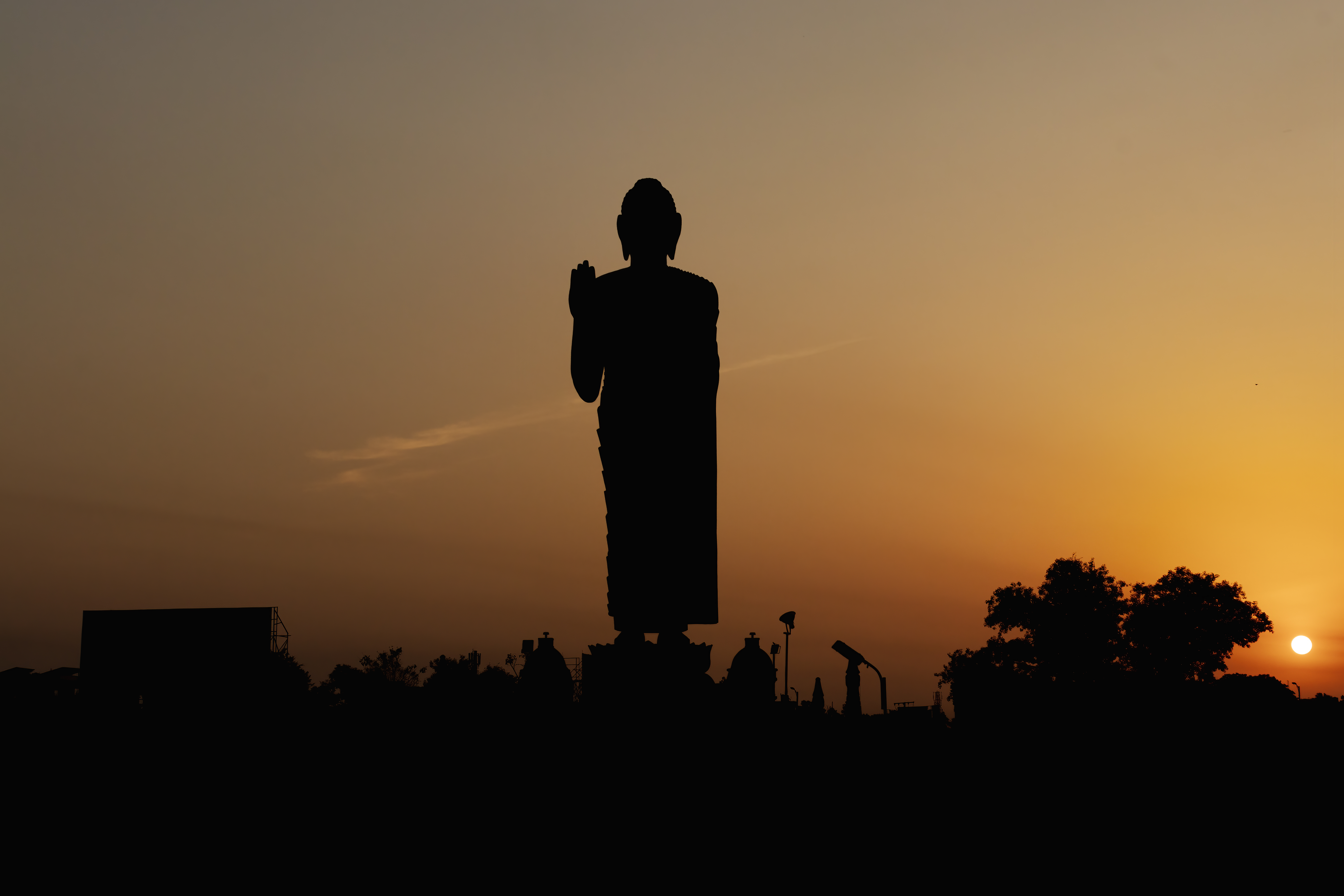
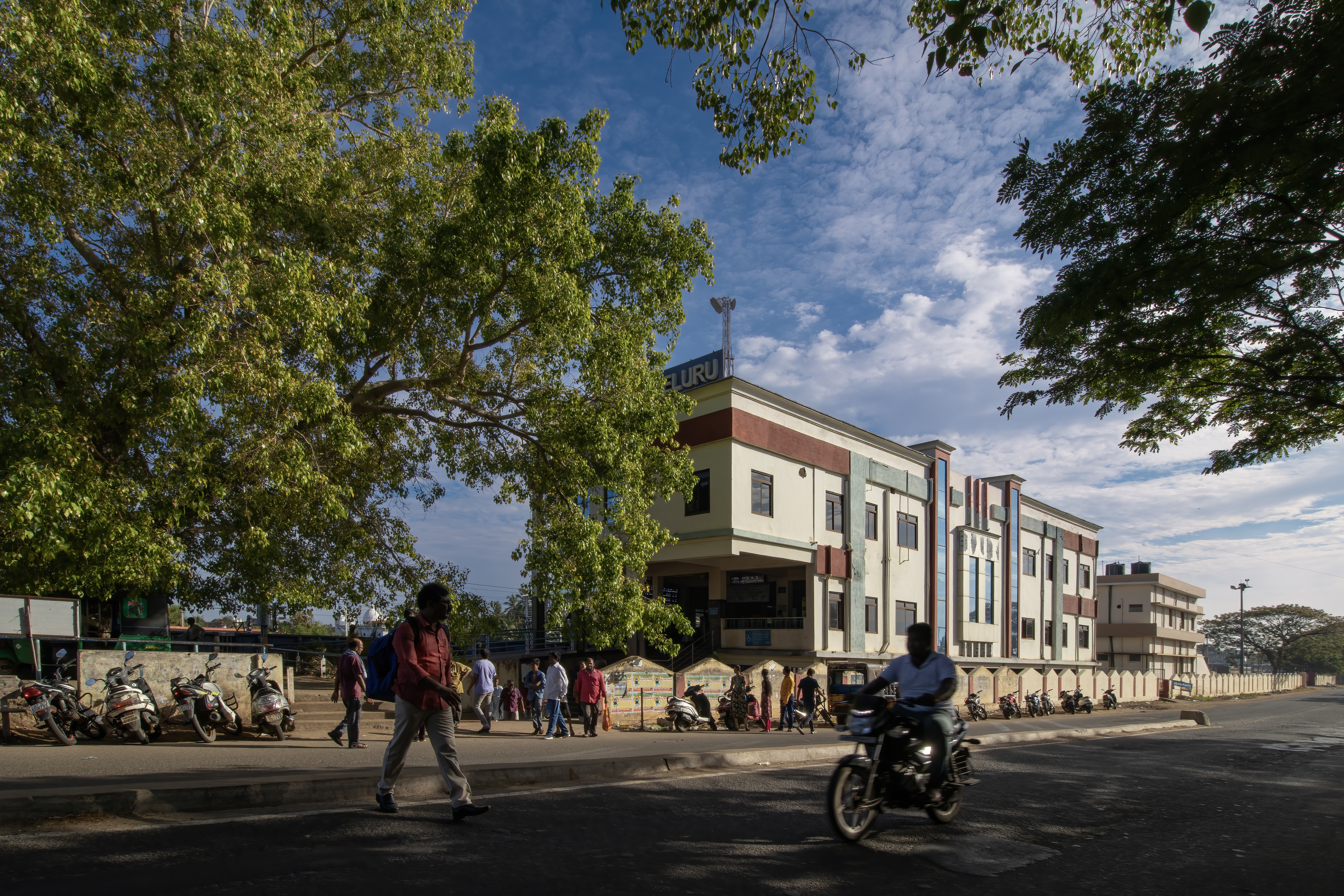
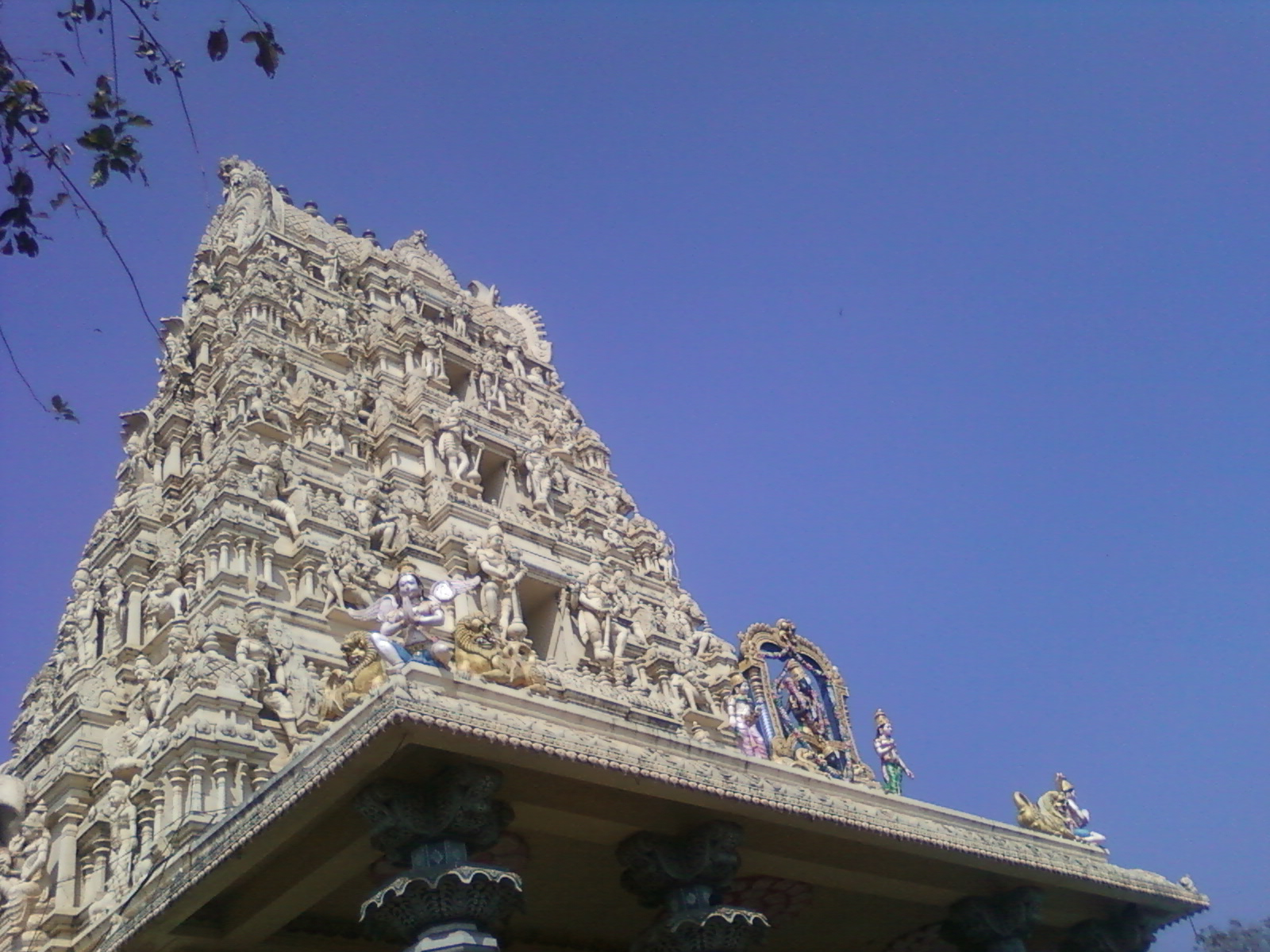
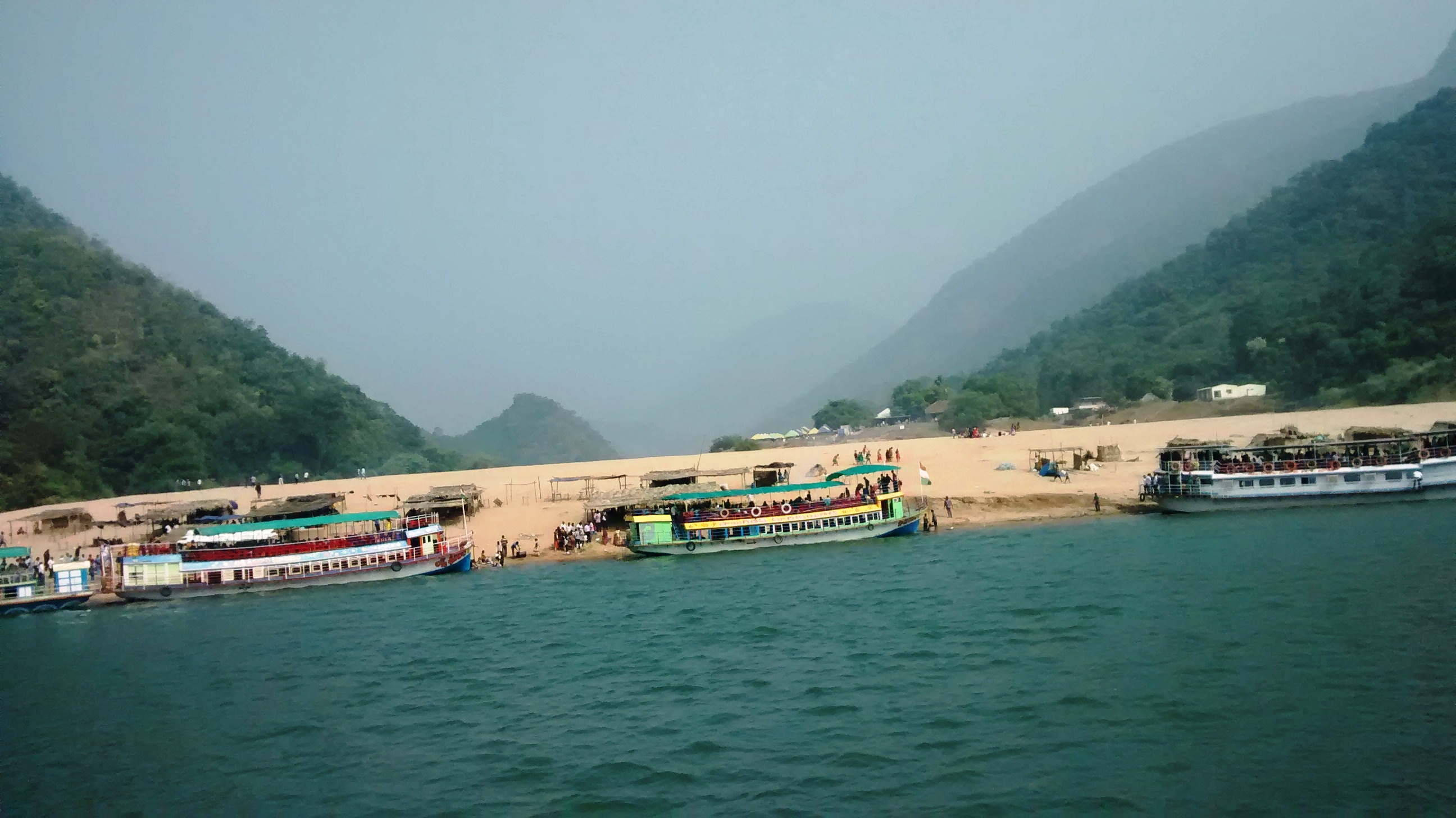
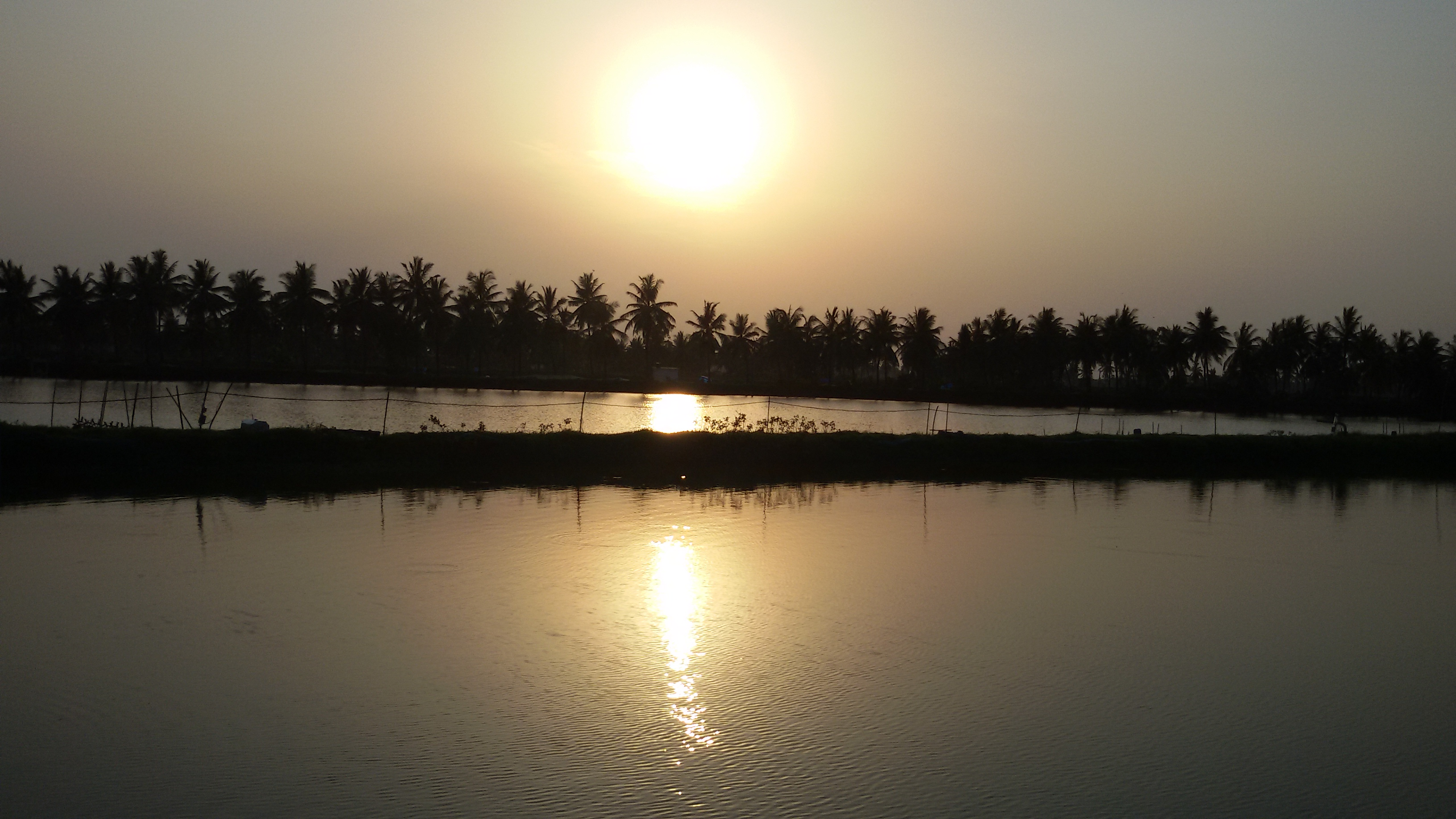
- Clockwise from top-left: Polavaram Project, Abhaya Buddha Statue in Eluru, Eluru Railway Station, South Gopuram of Dwaraka Tirumala Temple, Papikondalu Hills, Kolleru Lake.

- Eluru district in Andhra Pradesh
- Interactive map of Eluru District
- Coordinates: 16.7151°N 81.1203°E
- Country: India
- State: Andhra Pradesh
- Region: Kosta Andhra
- Established: 4 April 2022
- Restructured: 16 February 2023
- Headquarters: Eluru
- Mandals: 28

Government
  - District collector: K. Vetri Selvi. I A S
  - Lok Sabha constituencies: Eluru
  - MP: Putta Mahesh Kumar
  - Assembly constituencies: 07

Area
  - Total: 6,579 km^{2} (2,540 sq mi)

Population (2011)
  - Total: 2,006,737
  - Density: 305.0/km^{2} (790.0/sq mi)

Demographics
  - Sex ratio: 1004
- Time zone: UTC+5:30 (IST)
- Postal Index Number: 534 XXX
- Vehicle registration: AP-37 (former) AP–39 (from 30 January 2019)
- Major highways: NH-16, NH-216, NH-216A, NH-365BB, NH-516D, NH-516E
- District LGD code: 748
- District abbreviation: LR
- Website: eluru.ap.gov.in

Eluru district is a district in the Kosta Andhra region in the Indian state of Andhra Pradesh. Eluru is its administrative headquarters. It was formed from erstwhile West Godavari and Krishna districts on 4 April 2022. It was restructured on 16 February 2023 with the transfer of Ganapavaram mandal to West Godavari district.

== History ==
Eluru district has shared common history with West Godavari district. The Eastern Chalukyas ruled coastal Andhra from 700 to 1200 with Vengi, near Pedavegi village, as their capital. Historical pieces of evidence are found at the villages, Pedavegi and Guntupalli (Jilakarragudem). Eluru then became a part of the Kalinga Empire until 1471. Later it fell into the hands of the Gajapati Empire. In 1515, Krishnadevaraya captured it. After the fall of the Vijayanagara Empire, it was taken by the Sultan of Golconda Fort, Kutub Shah. Eluru District was formed with Eluru as its headquarters on 4 April 2022. Ganapavaram mandal was shifted to West godavari district on 16 February 2023.

== Geography ==
The district occupies an area of 6,579 square kilometres (2,540 sq mi). The district is bounded by Khammam district and Polavaram district on the north, West Godavari district and Konnasemma District on the south. The Godavari River separates East Godavari district on east and Tammileru River and Kolleru Lake separates it from Krishna district and NTR district on the west.

== Topography ==
=== Rivers and waterbodies ===
The district is primarily served by the major river Godavari and three tributaries: Yerrakaluva, Tammileru, and Ramileru. Additionally, a freshwater lake flows through the district, serving as a crucial water source. Recently, the Government of India initiated the Polavaram Project, a water reservoir with the potential to store up to 194.6 TMC of water. This project aims to provide a significant water source for other parts of Andhra Pradesh, with the capacity to divert water to drought-prone areas such as Rayalaseema and other districts through the Buckingham Canal. Originally constructed by the British, the Buckingham Canal is now part of India's Inland Waterway project, designed to facilitate civilian and goods transportation, potentially reducing transportation costs and improving connectivity through waterways.

=== Climate ===
The region has a tropical climate similar to the rest of the Coastal Andhra region. The summers (March–June) are hot and dry while the winters are fairly cold. The rainy season (July–December) is often the best time for tourist visits, as fields are brilliantly green with paddy crops, rivers flowing with monsoon water, and a relatively cool climate. The region has long been home to the Indian nobles due to its climate and fertile soil, and several zamindar large mansions are scattered around the Godavari area.

== Demographics ==
Religions in Eluru district as of 2025 based on 2011 census
| Religion | Percent |
| Hinduism | 93.09% |
| Christianity | 3.35% |
| Islam | 3.21% |
| Other or not stated | 0.35% |
Distribution of religions

At the time of its establishment in 2022, based on 2011 census, the district has a population of 1,937,695. Women number 969,945, making up 50.05% of the district's population. About 1,618,288 people (80.70%) live in rural areas. The urban population is 384,370 (19.84%), spread across four towns. Scheduled Castes number 424,446 (21.90% of the district), while Scheduled Tribes total 121,311 (6.26% of the district).

Languages of Eluru district as of 2025 based on 2011 census
1. Telugu (93.6%)
2. Koya (2.77%)
3. Urdu (2.65%)
4. Others (0.95%)

== Politics ==
There are one parliamentary and seven assembly constituencies in Eluru district. The parliamentary constituencies are

- Eluru (Lok Sabha constituency)
- Rajahmundry Lok Sabha constituency partially

The assembly constituencies are

| Constituency Serial No. | Name | Reserved for Status |
|---|---|---|
| 63 | Unguturu | None |
| 64 | Denduluru | None |
| 65 | Eluru | None |
| 67 | Polavaram | ST |
| 68 | Chintalapudi | SC |
| 70 | Nuzvid | None |
| 73 | Kaikalur | None |

== Administrative divisions ==
The district is divided into 3 revenue divisions: Eluru, Jangareddygudem, and Nuzividu, which are further subdivided into a total of 28 mandals, each headed by a sub-collector.

=== Mandals ===
The list of 28 mandals in Eluru district, divided into 3 revenue divisions, is given below.

1. Eluru revenue division
  1. Bhimadole
  2. Denduluru
  3. Eluru Rural
  4. Eluru Urban
  5. Kaikalur
  6. Kalidindi
  7. Mandavalli
  8. Mudinepalli
  9. Nidamarru
  10. Pedapadu
  11. Pedavegi
2. Jangareddygudem revenue division
  1. Buttayagudem
  2. Dwaraka Tirumala
  3. Jangareddygudem
  4. Jeelugu Milli
  5. Kamavarapukota
  6. Koyyalagudem
  7. Kukunuru
  8. Polavaram
  9. T. Narasapuram
  10. Velairpadu
3. Nuzvid revenue division
  1. Agiripalli
  2. Chatrai
  3. Chintalapudi
  4. Lingapalem
  5. Musunuru
  6. Nuzvid

== Cities and towns ==
Largest cities or towns in Eluru District As per the 2011 Census
| Name of the City | Revenue Division | 2011 Census Population |
|---|---|---|
| Eluru | Eluru | 231,250 |
| Nuzvidu | Nuzvidu Division | 58,590 |
| Jangareddygudem | Jangareddygudem Division | 48,994 |
| Chintalapudi | Nuzvidu Division | 25,952 |
| Kaikaluru | Eluru Division | 21,292 |
| Unguturu | Eluru Division | 14,280 |
| Bhimadole | Eluru Division | 13,669 |
| Mudinepalli | Eluru Division | 6463 |
| Chatrai | Nuzvidu Division | 4613 |

Municipal Bodies in Eluru District
| Municipal Body | Civic Status of town | Establishment year |
|---|---|---|
| Eluru | Municipal Corporation | 2005 |
| Nuzvid | Municipality Grade – 3 | 1983 |
| Jangareddygudem | Municipality Grade – 3 | 2011 |

== Economy ==
The woolen pile carpet industry in Eluru produces eco-friendly carpets.

== Culture and tourism ==
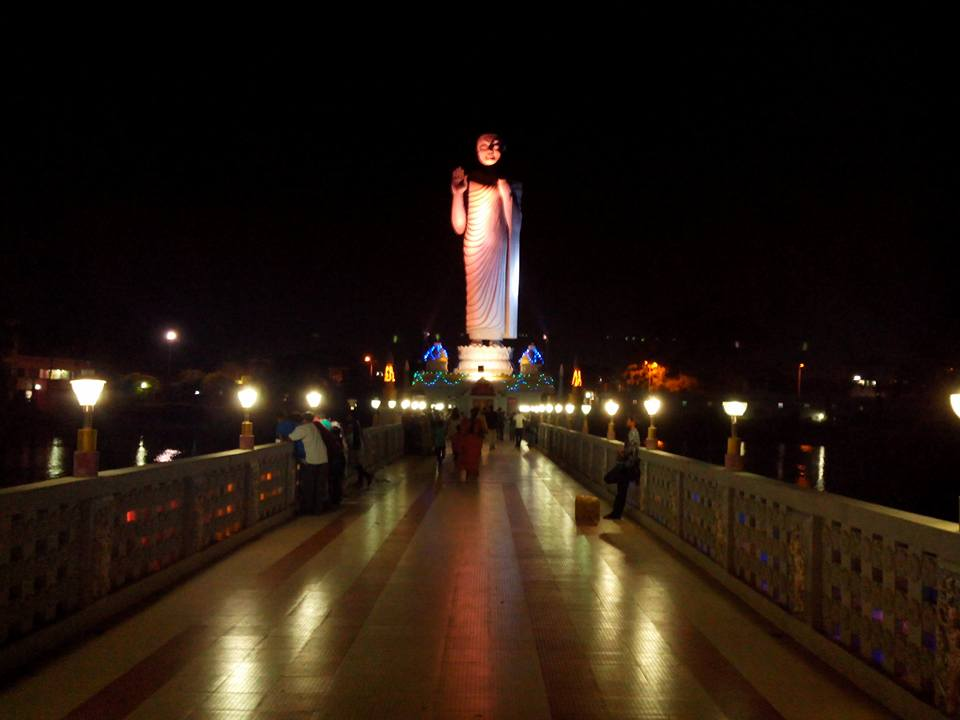
Buddha Park at Eluru

There are many landmarks and tourism destinations in the district. Eluru is the largest city of the district with many destinations related to Buddhists and Archeological importance such as Guntupalle Buddhist Caves near the city. Eluru city hosts a 74-foot high Buddha statue in the heart of the city. Some of the religious destinations include, Dwaraka Tirumala known with the name as Chinna Tirumala, and Veerabhadra Temple, Pattiseema.

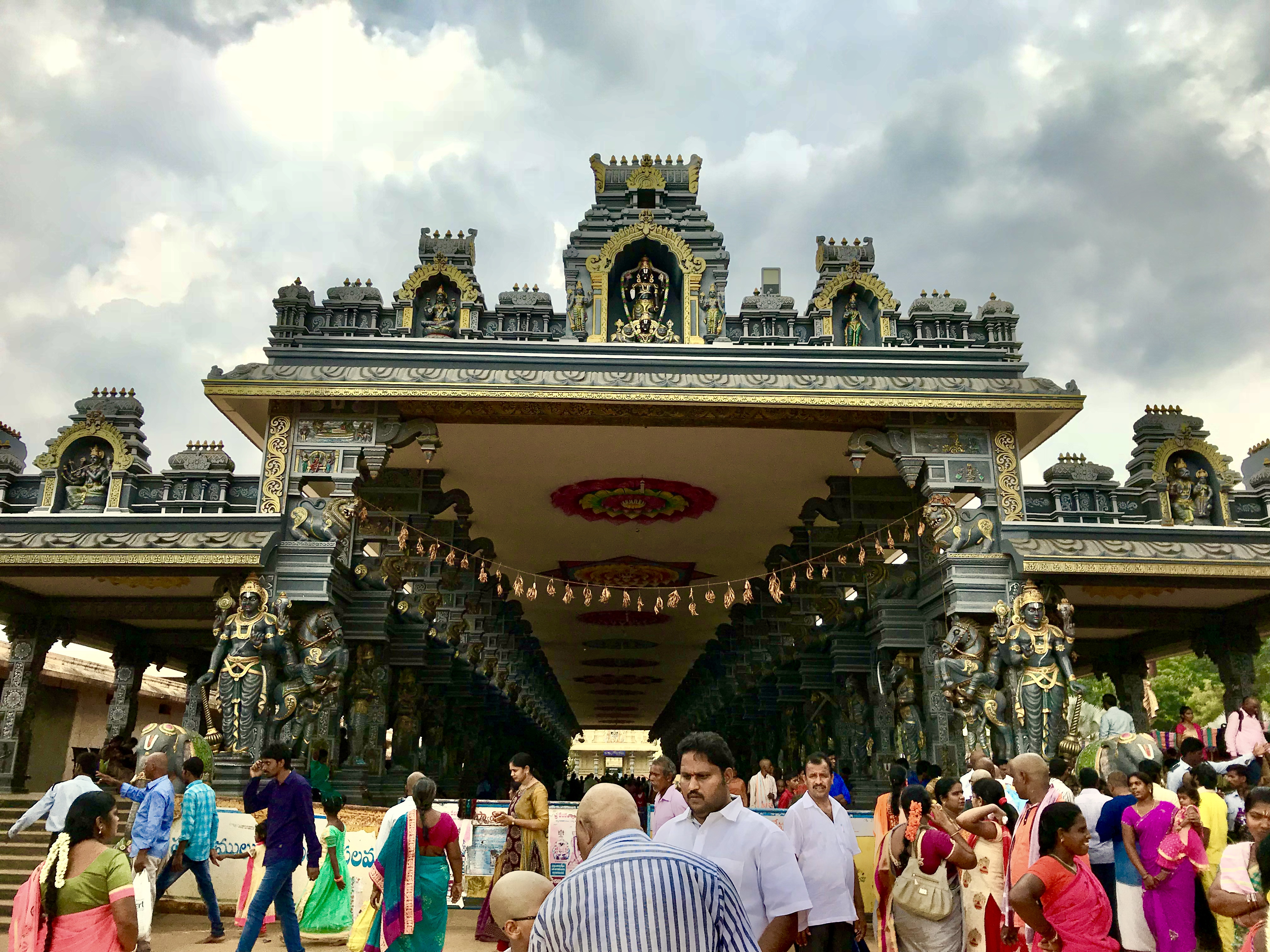
Dwaraka Tirumala Temple devotees

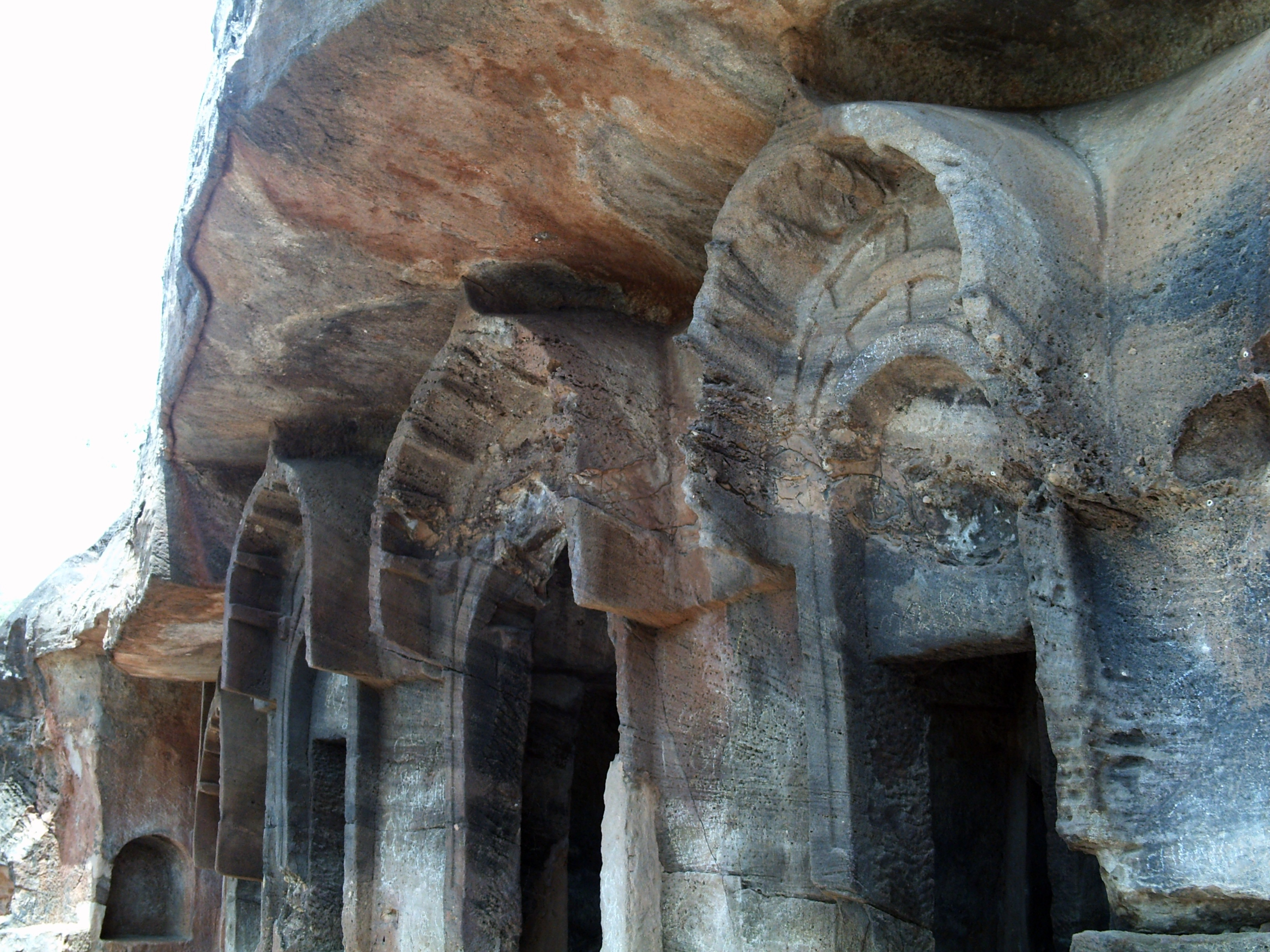
Caves on Dhammalingesvarasvami Hill at Guntupalle

== Notable people ==
- Sekhar Kammula, film director
- Kurma Venkata Reddy Naidu, Chief Minister of Madras Presidency
- L. V. Prasad, Indian film producer, actor, director, cinematographer and businessman
- Duvvuri Subbarao, former Reserve Bank Governor
- Silk Smitha, Actress
- Naga Shaurya, Actor
- Baladitya (actor), Actor
