= Akividu mandal =

- Mandal
- Interactive map of Akividu mandal
- Location in Andhra Pradesh, India
- Coordinates: 16.6000°N 81.3833°E
- Country: India
- State: Andhra Pradesh
- District: West Godavari
- Headquarters: Akividu

Government
  - Body: Mandal Parishad

Area
  - Total: 111.29 km^{2} (42.97 sq mi)

Population (2011)
  - Total: 73,889
  - Density: 663.93/km^{2} (1,719.6/sq mi)

Languages
  - Official: Telugu
- Time zone: UTC+5:30 (IST)
- Vehicle registration: AP 37

Akividu mandal is one of the 19 mandals in West Godavari district of the Indian state of Andhra Pradesh. The headquarters is located at Akividu town. The mandal is bordered by Nidamarru mandal to the west, Krishna district to the south, Tanuku and Undi mandal to the north and Kalla mandal to the east.

== Demographics ==
As of the 2011 Census of India, the mandal had a population of 73,889 in 20,869 households. The total population constituted 36,778 males and 37,111 females, for a sex ratio of 1,009 females per 1000 males. There were 7,157 children in the age group of 0–6 years, of which 3,623 were boys and 3,534 were girls, for a sex ratio of 975. The average literacy rate stands at 71.57% with 47,757 literates, of which 24,953 are males and 22,804 are females. There were 5,379 members of Scheduled Castes and 902 members of Scheduled Tribes.

=== Labor ===
As per the report published by Census India in 2011, 33,094 people were engaged in work activities, including 22,108 males and 9,314 females. In the census, 22,672 workers describe their work as main work, 2,232 as cultivators, 13,433 as agricultural labourers, 526 in household industry and 6,481 were involved in other works. Of these, 10,422 were marginal workers.

== Administration ==
Akividu mandal is administered under the Undi Assembly constituency of the Narasapuram Lok Sabha constituency and is one of the sixteen mandals in the Narasapuram revenue division.

== Towns and villages ==
As of 2011 census, the mandal has 15 settlements, all of which are villages. Akividu is the largest and Kolleru is the smallest in terms of population.

The settlements in the mandal are:

1. A.I.Bheemavaram
2. Ajjamuru
3. Akividu
4. Apparaopet
5. Cherukumilli
6. Chinakapavaram
7. Dharmapuram
8. Dumpagadapa
9. Gummuluru
10. Kollaparru
11. Kolleru
12. Kuppanapudi
13. Madivada
14. Pedakapavaram
15. Siddapuram
16. Taratava

== Education ==
The mandal plays a major role in education for the rural students of nearby villages. The primary and secondary school education is imparted by government, aided by private schools, under the School Education Department of the state. As per the school information report for the academic year 2015–16, the mandal has more than 10,441 students enrolled in over 89 schools.

== See also ==
- List of mandals in Andhra Pradesh
