= Budameru Rivulet =

River in Andhra Pradesh, India

Budameru
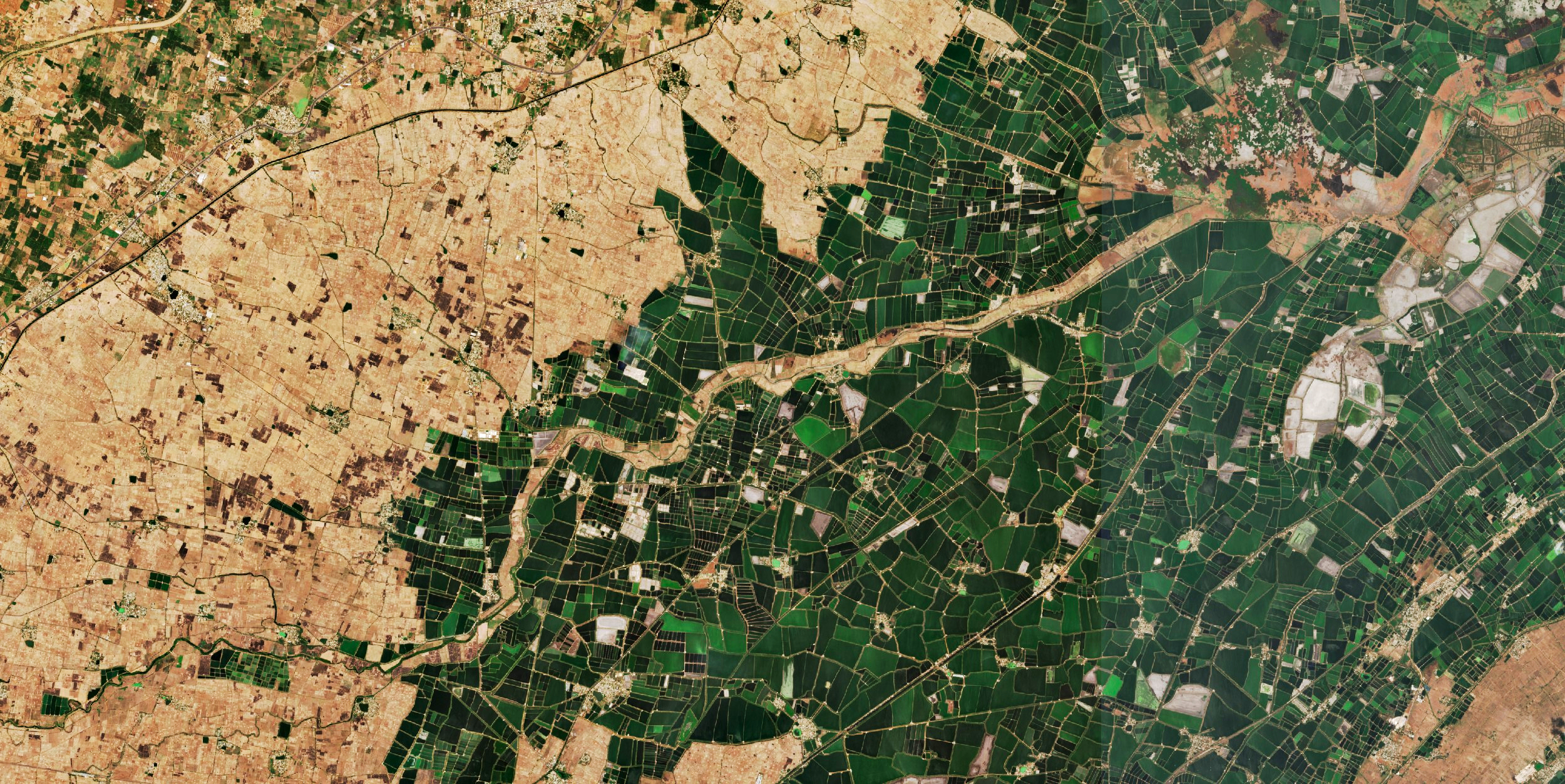
- Budameru flowing between fishing lakes near Eluru

Location
- Country: India
- State: Andhra Pradesh
- District: NTR district, Krishna district, Eluru district.

Physical characteristics
- Source: near Morusumilli, Mylavaram mandal.
  - location: 16°54′6″S 80°34′49″E
  - elevation: 140 m (460 ft)
- Mouth: Kolleru Lake
  - location: 16°37′59″S 81°12′12″E
  - elevation: 40 m (130 ft)
- Length: 162 km (101 mi)

Budameru is a rivulet in NTR district which originates in the hills surrounding Mylavaram and empties itself into Kolleru Lake. Budameru is also known as The Sorrow of Vijayawada. In order to control the floods, the rivulet was controlled with the Velagaleru Regulator at Velagaleru village and a diversion channel named, Budameru Diversion Channel (BDC) was constructed from Velagaleru to join Krishna River upstream of Prakasam Barrage.

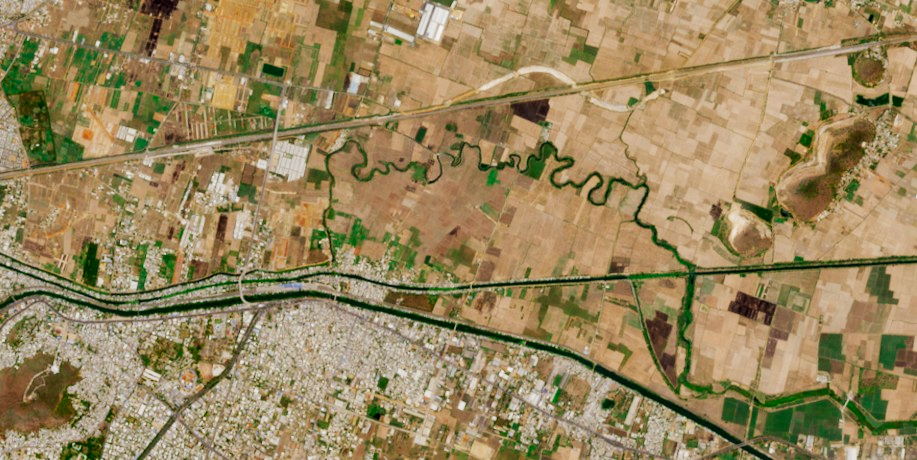
Aerial view of Budameru near Ramavarappadu

This is the first water diversion to the main Krishna river from another river basin. The diversion channel has 10,500 cusecs flow capacity. This diversion channel is made part of Polavaram right bank canal at its tail end. However its flow capacity is to be enhanced to 17,500 cusecs to match with the design capacity of Polavaram right bank canal. In the downstream of the Velagaleru regulator, two more smaller diversion channels were constructed to divert the middle Budameru flood water to the upstream of Prakasam Barrage for reducing the inundation in Vijayawada city and Kolleru Lake.

== History ==
Budameru has a history of overflowing and inundating large swaths of farmlands and residential areas in Krishna district. The farmers of Kolleru region have been demanding to divert Budameru with a canal to Krishna river and also build a reservoir over it. The then deputy chief minister of Andhra Pradesh, Neelam Sanjiva Reddy has announced at a farmers meeting in 1956 in Akividu that the state has been allocated Rs 50 lakh for irrigation projects and the Budameru diversion channel which, according to him, would reduce the water level of Kolleru lake by 14 inches and save 25,000 acres of land from being inundated was the first project to be started out of these funds.

== Projects ==
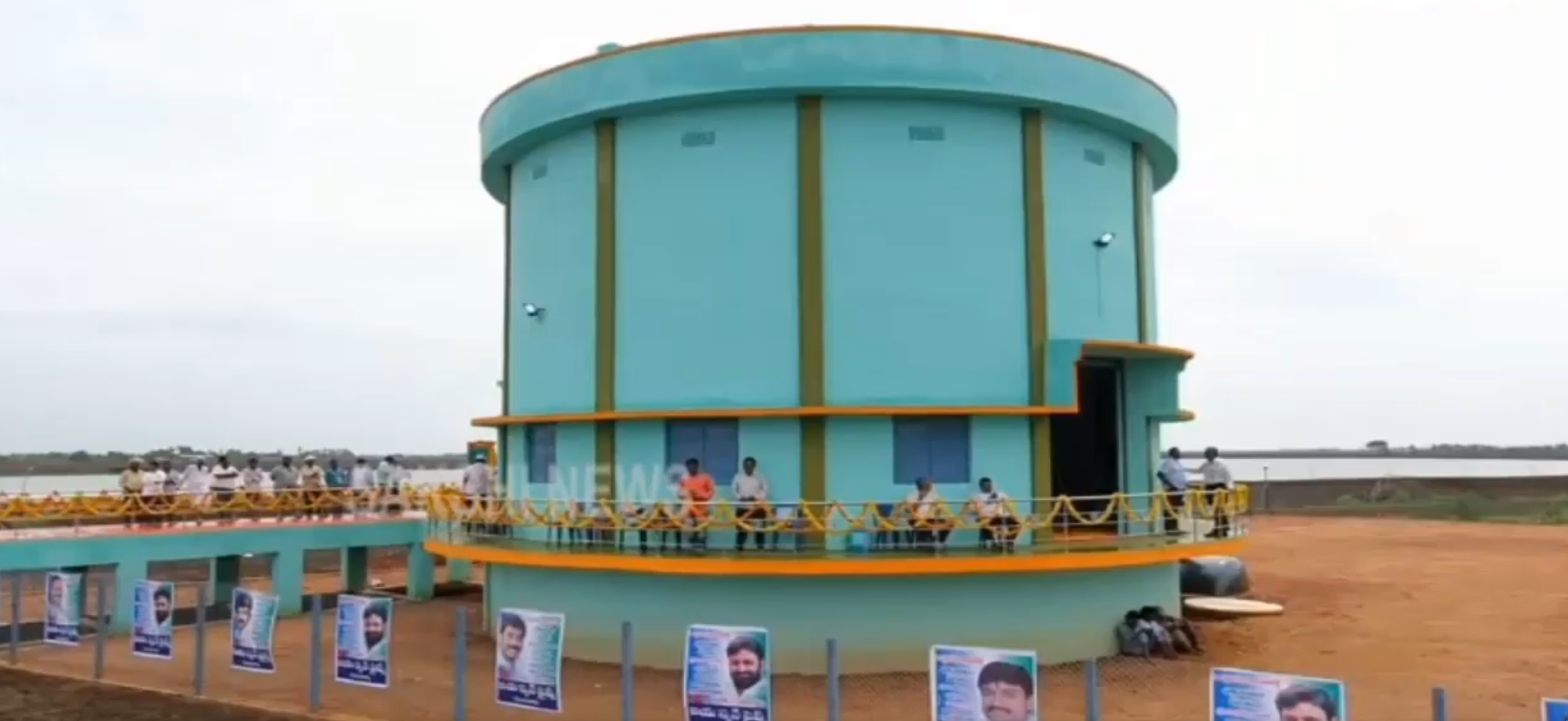
Aripirala lift irrigation project site

In 2019, a lift irrigation project was constructed over the canal at a cost of rupees nine crore by the state irrigation development corporation with support from NABARD near Aripirala village in Nandivada mandal.

Beautification of the canal in Vijayawada was started at an estimated cost of Rs 19 crore in 2020.

== Hydro power station feasibility ==
A hydro power plant of 25 MW capacity can be installed by routing Polavaram Right bank canal water to Prakasam barrage via existing Eluru canal. Polavaram Right bank canal is approaching the outskirts of Vijayawada city at 33 m MSL along the hill slopes located north of Ambapuram village. This point is only 7 km north of Prakasam Barrage but the canal takes another 30 km detour to get connected to the Prakasam barrage pond near Ibrahimpatnam town. The existing Eluru canal from Prakasam barrage was dug across the elevated ridge/doab (where Vijayawada city is located) to cross the Krishna river basin and supply water in to lower Budameru river basin. This canal while crossing the city is a deep cut canal (maximum water level below local ground level). Eluru deep cut canal portion (first 3 km length) can be safely used to feed water (reversing water flow direction) in to Prakasam barrage pond (full pond level at 17.35 m MSL) by connecting Polavaram Right bank canal with the canal after Ayodhya Nagar. A hydraulic drop of nearly 11 meters is available when the Polavaram right bank canal is connected to the canal which would generate 25 MW Hydro power at 10,000 cusecs flow. No land acquisition in Vijawawada city is required as the tail race canal is routed along the Budameru stream to connect to the existing canal. It is possible to build flood protection bunds to the flood prone areas in the Vijayawada city while executing the 25 MW power project.

== Interstate water sharing ==
As per the inter state agreements dated 4 August 1978 (page 89) and 29 January 1979 (page 101) with Andhra Pradesh, Karnataka and Maharashtra are entitled to use 21 tmcft and 14 tmcft respectively out of the 80 tmcft water transferred by Polavaram right bank canal from Polavaram reservoir to Prakasam barrage pond across Krishna river. If the Prakasam Barrage eastern delta water requirements (Water supplied by Eluru, Rivas, and Bander canals) are met directly from the Polavaram right bank canal bypassing Prakasam barrage pond/Krishna main river, this water would not be accounted under the 80 tmc which is to be shared with Karnataka and Maharashtra. Thus more Godavari water could be made available for use from the Prakasam barrage by connecting Polavaram right bank canal with Eluru canal via Budameru river.

== 2024 Vijayawada Floods ==
On 1 September 2024, the Budameru rivulet in Vijayawada experienced severe flooding, which was part of a broader flood event impacting the region. It has posed a significant threat to the city, surpassing the impact of the Krishna River. The last major flood event in 2005 saw Budameru overflow, submerging 15% of the city and leading to the postponement of municipal elections. In 2024 Floodwaters from Khammam district flowed into Vijayawada with unprecedented force, reaching a discharge of 70,000 cusecs, well above the typical maximum of 11,000 cusecs. During the floods, the Prakasam Barrage, which regulates water flow from the river, recorded unprecedented inflows of 11.43 lakh cusecs, whereas its discharge capacity is 11.90 lakh cusecs. The inflows reduced to 11.19 lakh cusecs by night of 2 September 2024, with further reductions anticipated as the situation improved. The floods resulted in significant property damage, with extensive impacts on both public and private assets, as well as considerable crop losses. Efforts were made to manage and mitigate the effects of the flooding, with local authorities working to restore normalcy in the affected areas.
