= Kaikalur mandal =

Kaikalur
- Mandal
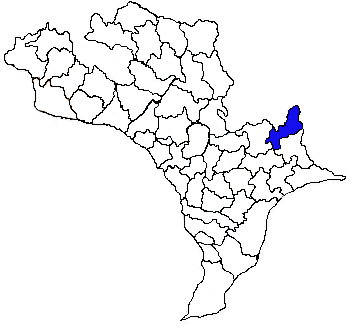
- Mandal map of Krishna district showing Kaikalur mandal (in Blue Colour)
- Interactive map of Kaikalur
- Location in Andhra Pradesh, India
- Coordinates: 16.55089°N 81.2000°E
- Country: India
- State: Andhra Pradesh
- District: Eluru
- Headquarters: Kaikalur

Government
  - Body: Mandal Parishad

Area
  - Total: 162.15 km^{2} (62.61 sq mi)

Population (2011)
  - Total: 77,654
  - Density: 478.90/km^{2} (1,240.4/sq mi)

Languages
  - Official: Telugu
- Time zone: UTC+5:30 (IST)
- Vehicle registration: AP 16

Kaikalur mandal is one of the 28 mandals in Eluru district of the Indian state of Andhra Pradesh. The headquarters of this mandal is located at Kaikalur town. The mandal is bordered by West Godavari district to both north and east, Kalidindi mandal to the south and Mudinepalle mandal and Mandavalli mandal to the west.

== Demographics ==
As of 2011 census, the mandal had a population of 77,654 living in 21,660 households. The total population constituted 38,890 males and 38,764 females, for a sex ratio of 997 females per 1000 males. There were 7,638 children in the age group of 0–6 years, of which 3,965 were boys and 3,673 were girls, for a sex ratio of 926. The average literacy rate stands at 70.94% with 49,672 literates, of which 26,048 are males and 23,624 are females. There were 8,973 members of Scheduled Castes and 468 members of Scheduled Tribes.

=== Labour statistics ===
As per the report published by Census of India in 2011, 35,752 people were engaged in work activities, including 23,476 males and 12,276 females. In the census, 25,746 workers describe their work as main work, 1,608 as cultivators, 14,504 as agricultural labourers, 453 in household industry and 9,181 were involved in other works. Of these, 10,006 were marginal workers.

== Administration ==
Kaikalur mandal is administered under the Kaikalur Assembly constituency of the Eluru Lok Sabha constituency. It is one of the fifteen mandals those falls under Nuzvid revenue division.

== Towns and villages ==
As of 2011 census, there are a total of 19 settlements in the mandal. Kaikalur is the largest and Peddavaram is the smallest in terms of population.

The settlements in the mandal are:

- Achavaram
- Alapadu
- Atapaka
- Bhujabalapatnam
- Doddipatla
- Gonepadu
- Gopavaram
- Kaikalur
- Kolletikota
- Kottada
- Pallevada
- Penchikalamarru
- Rachapatnam
- Ramavaram
- Seetanapalle
- Singapuram
- Someswaram
- Syamalambapuram
- Tamarakollu
- Vadarlapadu
- Varahapatnam
- Vemavarappadu
- Vinjaram

== Education ==
The mandal plays a major role in education for the rural students of nearby villages. The primary and secondary school education is imparted by government, aided by private schools, under the School Education Department of the state. As per the school information report for the academic year 2015–16, the mandal has more than 10,610 students enrolled in over 87 schools.

== See also ==
- List of mandals in Andhra Pradesh
- Vijayawada
