= Department of Health, Family Welfare and Medical Education (Andhra Pradesh) =

Minister of Health, Family Welfare and Medical Education
- Ārōgyaṁ, Kutumba Sankṣēmaṁ mariyu Vaidya Vidya Śākha Mantrī
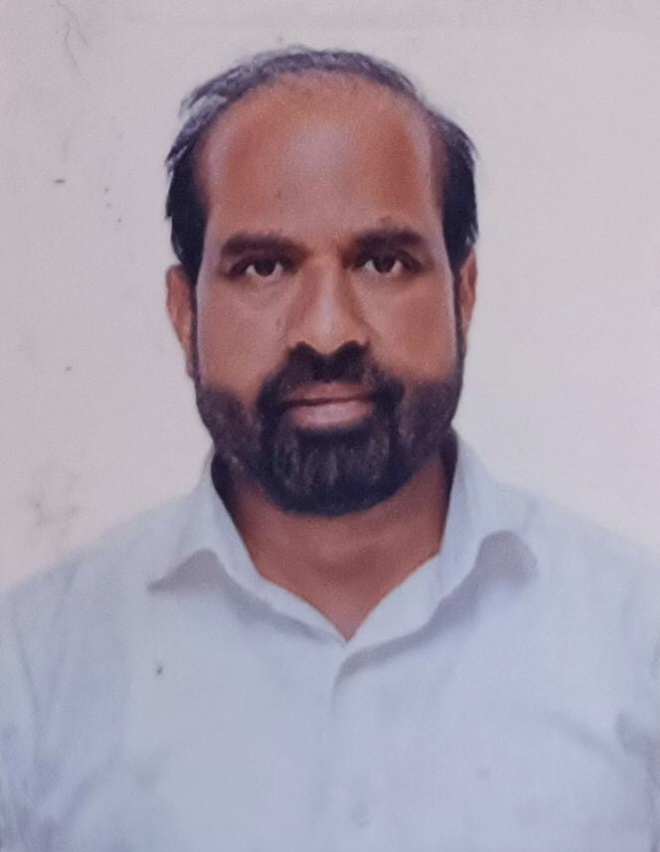
- Incumbent; Satya Kumar Yadav since 12 June 2024
- Department of Health, Family Welfare and Medical Education
- Member of: Andha Pradesh Cabinet
- Reports to: Governor of Andhra Pradesh; Chief Minister of Andhra Pradesh; Andhra Pradesh Legislature
- Appointer: Governor of Andhra Pradesh on the advice of the Chief Minister of Andhra Pradesh
- Inaugural holder: Kamineni Srinivas
- Formation: 8 June 2014
- Website: Official website

The minister for health, family welfare, and medical education or simply known as minister for health is the head of the Department of Health, Family Welfare, and Medical Education in the Government of Andhra Pradesh.

The incumbent minister of health, family welfare and medical education is Satya Kumar Yadav from Bharatiya Janata Party.

== List of ministers ==
#	Portrait	Minister (Lifespan) Constituency	Term of office			Election (Term)	Party	Ministry	Chief Minister	Ref.
#	Portrait	Minister (Lifespan) Constituency	Term start	Term end	Duration	Election (Term)	Party	Ministry	Chief Minister	Ref.
1		Kamineni Srinivas (born 1947); MLA for Kaikalur	8 June 2014	9 March 2018	3 years, 274 days	2014 (14th)	Bharatiya Janata Party	Naidu III	N. Chandrababu Naidu	
2		N. M. D. Farooq (born 1950); MLC	11 November 2018	29 May 2019	199 days	2014 (14th)	Telugu Desam Party	Naidu III	N. Chandrababu Naidu	
2		Kidari Sravan Kumar (born 1991); Provisional (Note: Appointed as minister on terms to be elected as a Member of Legislative Assembly or Member of Legislative Council within six months)	11 November 2018	9 May 2019	179 days	2014 (14th)	Telugu Desam Party	Naidu III	N. Chandrababu Naidu	
3		Alla Nani (born 1969); MLA for Eluru	30 May 2019	7 April 2022	2 years, 312 days	2019 (15th)	YSR Congress Party	Jagan	Y. S. Jagan Mohan Reddy	
4		Vidadala Rajini (born 1988); MLA for Chilakaluripet	11 April 2022	11 June 2024	2 years, 61 days	2019 (15th)	YSR Congress Party	Jagan	Y. S. Jagan Mohan Reddy	
5		Satya Kumar Yadav (born 1971); MLA for Dharmavaram	12 June 2024	Incumbent	2 years, 87 days	2024 (16th)	Bharatiya Janata Party	Naidu IV	N. Chandrababu Naidu	
