= Chilukurivarigudem =

- Village
- Interactive map of Chilukurivarigudem
- Location within Andhra Pradesh
- Coordinates: 16°50′14″N 80°37′30″E
- Country: India
- State: Andhra Pradesh
- Region: NTR
- Elevation: 47 m (154 ft)

Languages
  - Official: Telugu
- Time zone: UTC+5:30 (IST)
- Postal code: 521230
- Telephone code: +918659
- Vehicle registration: AP16
- Nearest city: Vijayawada
- Lok Sabha constituency: Vijayawada
- Vidhan Sabha constituency: Mylavaram
- Climate: hot (Köppen)

Chilukurivarigudem is a village in Mylavaram mandal, Vijayawada division, NTR district, Andhra Pradesh, India. It comes under the constituency of Mylavaram, Pulluru Panchayat. The main economic activity is agriculture. The village is known in district for its fruit orchards, paddy and mango groves.

== Geography ==
Chilukurivarigudem is located at 16.847262°N 80.627237°E. It has an average elevation of 47 metres (157 feet). The village is located 11 km away from Mylavaram along National Highway 221 (India) towards Bhadrachalam.
