= Kolleru Lake =

Lake in Andhra Pradesh, India

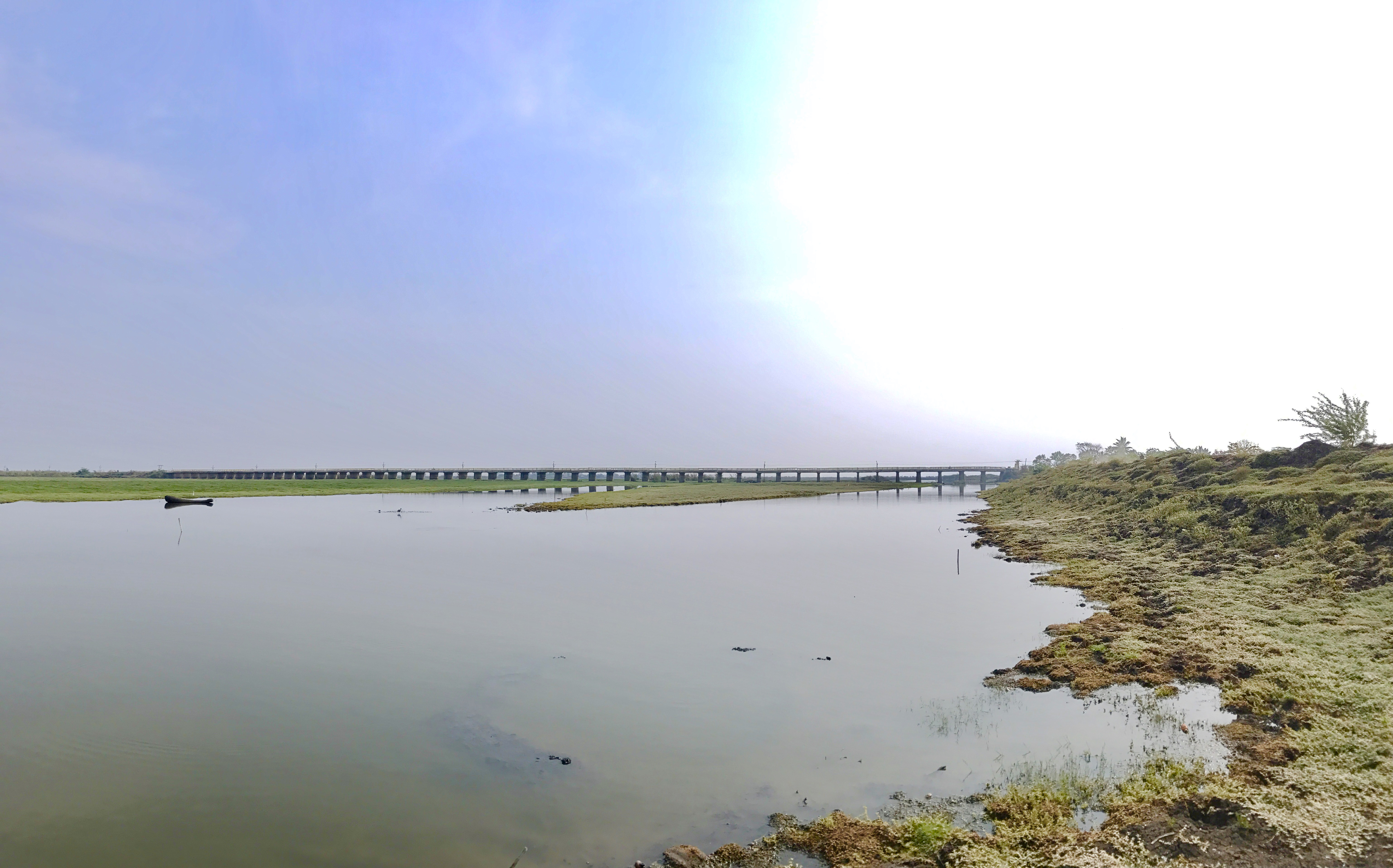
- A bridge over Kolleru

- Location within Andhra Pradesh
- Interactive map of Kolleru Lake
- Location: Andhra Pradesh
- Coordinates: 16°39′N 81°13′E
- Primary inflows: Ramileru, Tammileru, Budameru, Polaraj drain
- Primary outflows: Upputeru
- Basin countries: India
- Surface area: 90,100 hectares (222,600 acres) (245 sq km lake area)
- Average depth: 1.0 metre (3 ft 3 in)
- Max. depth: 2.0 metres (6 ft 7 in)
- Islands: Kolletikota(Heart of Kolleru Lake), Gudivakalanka
- Settlements: Eluru

Ramsar Wetland
- Designated: 19 August 2002
- Reference no.: 1209

Kolleru Lake is one of the largest freshwater lakes in India and forms the largest shallow freshwater lake in Asia (with 245 km^{2} of lake area and 302 km^{2} of total Ramsar designated wetland). 15 kilometers away from Eluru and 65 km from Rajamahendravaram, the lake is located between the Krishna and Godavari river deltas. Kolleru Lake is located mostly in the Eluru district in the state of Andhra Pradesh. The lake is fed directly by water from the seasonal Budameru and Tammileru rivulets, and is connected to the Krishna and Godavari irrigation systems by over 67 major and minor irrigation canals. This lake is a major tourist attraction. Many birds migrate here in winter, such as Siberian crane, ibis, and painted storks. The lake was an important habitat for an estimated 20 million resident and migratory birds, including the grey or spot-billed pelican (Pelecanus philippensis). The lake was declared as a wildlife sanctuary in November 1999 under India's Wildlife Protection Act of 1972, and designated a wetland of international importance in November 2002 under the international Ramsar Convention. The wildlife sanctuary covers an area of 308 km^{2}.

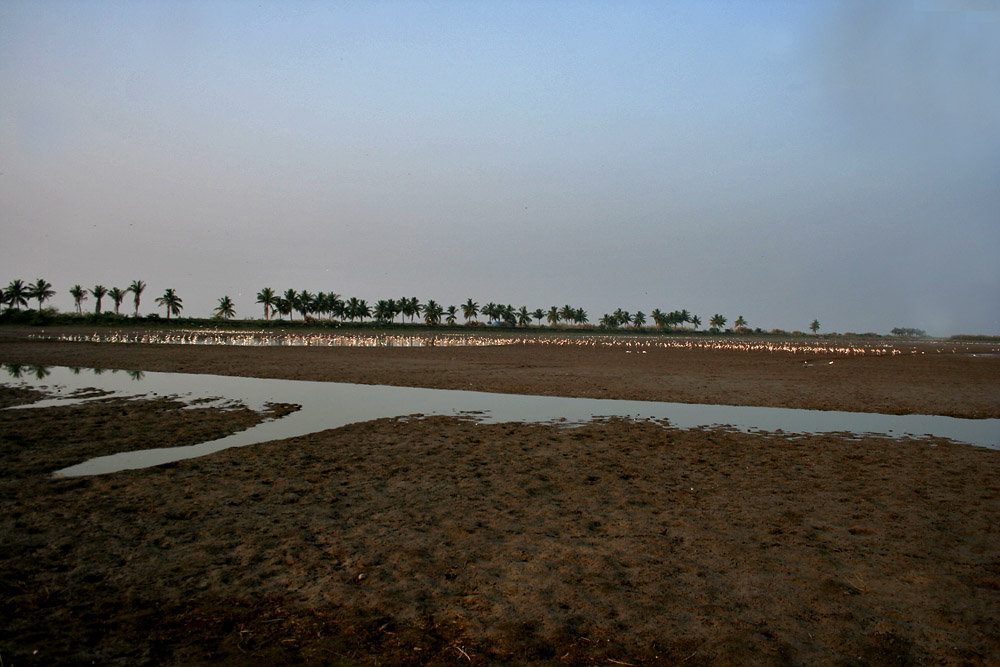
Egrets, grey herons, painted storks and black-headed ibises gathering in thousands at Kolleru Lake, Andhra Pradesh, India.

Kolleru Lake under Ramsar Convention (allowing local communities (Here: Vaddi Community) to continue their occupation of culture fish and caught fish) covers 90,100 hectares (222,600 acres) and Kolleru Lake under Wildlife Sanctuary covers 166,000 acres (67,200 ha).

== Current state of the lake ==
Thousands of fish tanks were erected, effectively converting the lake into a simple drain. This has a great impact in terms of pollution, leading to difficulty in getting drinking water for the local people. This is in addition to the decline of ecological diversity and intrusion of sea water into the land masses and its fallout in terms of adverse influence on the rainfall pattern in this region. Due to the promulgation of bunds of illegal fish tanks blocking water flow, there has been a cessation of water drainage into the sea, causing excessive flooding and subsequent adverse effects on the thousands of acres of crops in the upper reaches of the sanctuary.

This pollution is caused by numerous factories built along the lake that discharge waste products into the lake, whose water is used for food production. In 2006, the Andhra Pradesh government executed "Operation Kolleru", an effort to clean up the lake, in the past, with middling success, and has now declared "Operation Kolleru-2.0".

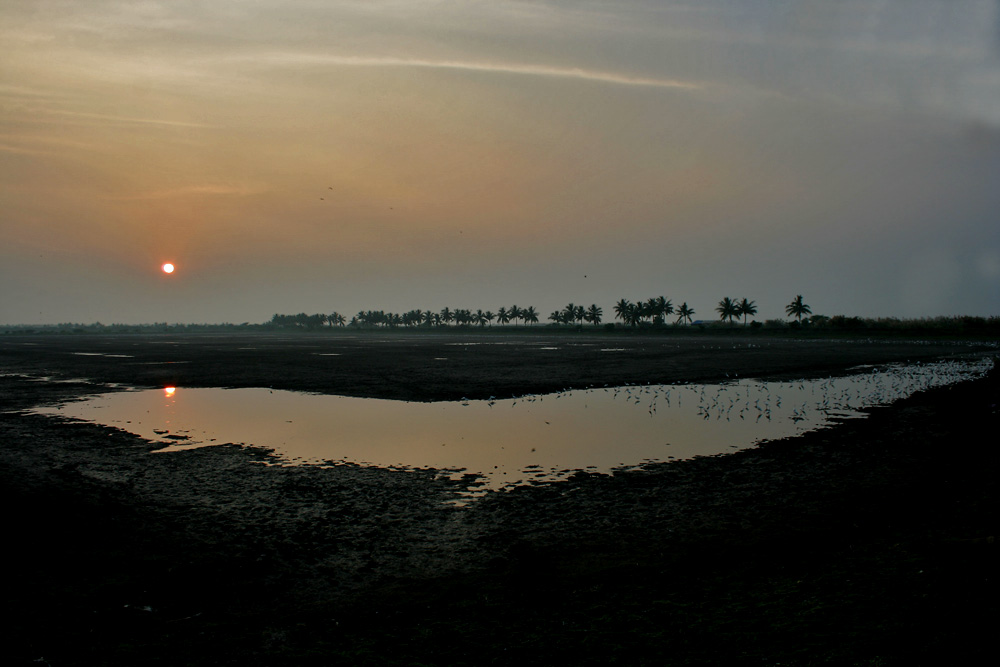
Kolleru Lake

Satellite images taken on 9 February 2001 by the Indian remote sensing satellite found that approximately 42% of the 245 km^{2} lake was occupied by aquaculture, while agriculture had encroached upon another 8.5%. The area under aquaculture consisted of 1,050 fish ponds within the lake and 38 dried-up fish ponds, which together covered an area of 103 km^{2}. The aquaculture fishermen fire gunshots to prevent birds from feeding on the fish. The agricultural encroachments were mostly rice paddies. Surprisingly, no clear water could be found in the satellite image. The rest of the lake is diminished by water diversion or is infested with weeds like elephant grass and the water hyacinth.

Rich in flora and fauna, the lake had always attracted migratory birds from Northern Asia and Eastern Europe, between the months of October and March. During this season, the lake used to be visited by an estimated two million birds.

The resident birds include:

- grey pelicans,
- Asian open-bill (Anastomus oscitans),
- painted storks (Mycteria leucocephala),
- glossy ibises and
- white ibises.

The migratory birds include:

- red-crested pochards,
- black-winged stilts,
- pied avocets,
- common redshanks,
- Eurasian wigeons,
- gadwalls,
- great cormorants,
- garganeys,
- purple herons,
- greater flamingos,
- green-winged teals,
- northern pintails and
- northern shovelers.

Kolleru lake contains numerous fertile islets called lankas; many of the small ones are submerged during floods. The origin of the unusual depression which forms the bed of the lake is unknown, but it was possibly the result of an earthquake. Therefore, many ancient villages are precepted in the bed of the lake as a result of floods and earthquake. building the industries and factories near the lake that why the lake is polluting and the government also declared the operation kolleru.

== History ==
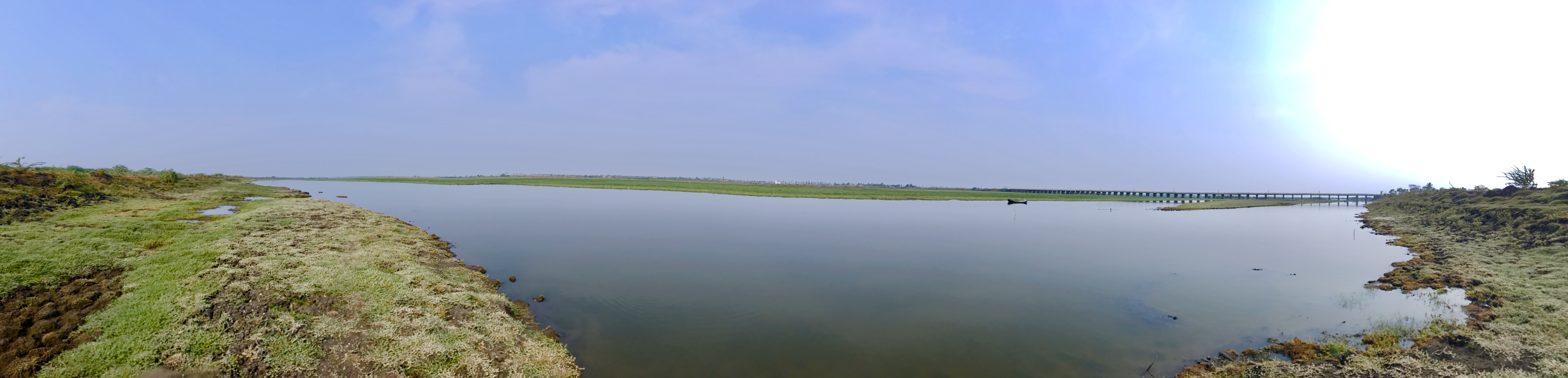

center

Two copper plates have been found in the lake, tracing its history to reign of the Eastern Ganga rulers, the Suryavamsi Gajapatis of Odisha at the height of their power in the 15th century under the reign of Kapilendra Deva, the first Suryavamsi Gajapati emperor, and the boundary of the Kalinga empire (Ancient Odisha). Nearby in Kolletikota is the Peddintlamma Temple, built by Eastern Ganga monarchs.

== Sanctuary ==
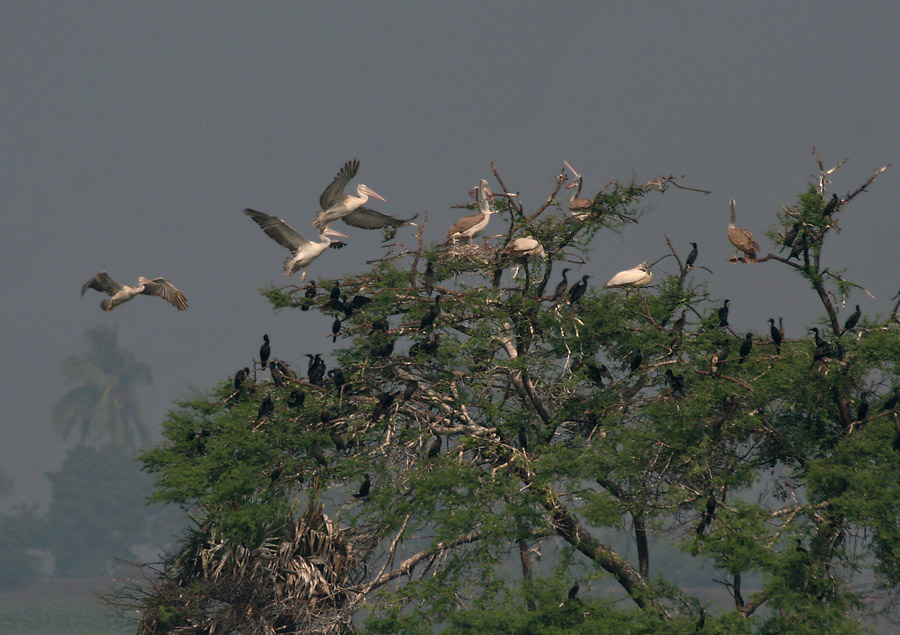
Spot-billed pelicans Pelecanus philippensis at Attapaka in Kolleru Lake, Andhra Pradesh, India.

The sanctuary has the following towers for birdwatching.

Atapaka: 1.5 km from Kaikaluru to see varieties of waterfowl. Murthyraju tank 8 km from Nidamarru East Chodavaram: 25 km from Eluru where openbill storks nest in colonies from July to December.

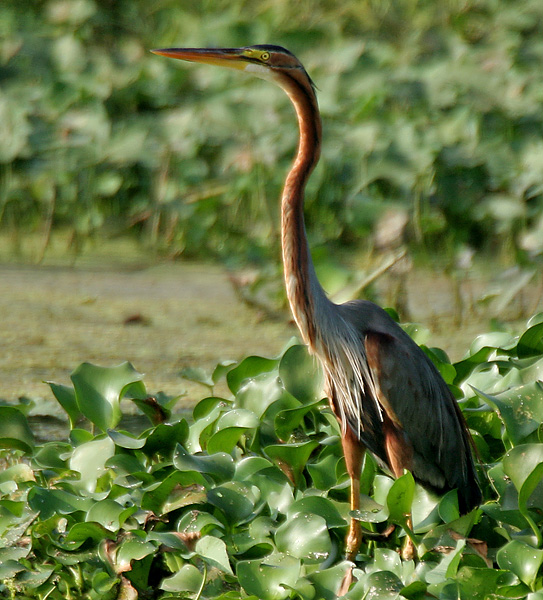
Purple heron (Ardea purpurea) in Kolleru

The sanctuary is approachable from all four sides of the lake by road, directly to the following places:

- Atapaka – 2.5 km from Kaikaluru town
- Bhujabalapatnam – 6 km from Kaikaluru
- Pallevada −9 km from kaikaluru town
- Kovvada Lanka—7 km from Kaikaluru town *Murthiraju Tanks – 8 km from Nidamarru
- Gudivakalanka – 3 km from Gudivakalanka or 15 km from Eluru, The nearest city by road or rail.
- Prathikola Lanaka or 19 km from Eluru. The nearest city is Eluru, which is 35 km by road.
- Kolletikota −18 km from Kaikalur.

=== Accommodations ===
Hotels are available in the nearby towns/cities of Eluru, Bhimavaram, Narsapur, Palakollu, Kaikaluru, Akividu, Rajamahendravaram, Vijayawada and Machilipatnam.
