= Pedakapavaram =

- Village
- Interactive map of Pedakapavaram
- Location in Andhra Pradesh, India Pedakapavaram (India)
- Coordinates: 16.65°N 81.42°E
- Country: India
- State: Andhra Pradesh
- District: West Godavari
- Talukas: Akividu
- Elevation: 6 m (20 ft)

Languages
  - Official: Telugu
- Time zone: UTC+5:30 (IST)

Pedakapavaram is a village in the Akividu mandal in the West Godavari district of the state of Andhra Pradesh in southern India.

== Geography ==
It is situated within the designated area of the famous Kolleru Lake bird sanctuary.

In recent years there has been significant flooding in the surrounding area, which local farmers believe is the result of poor management of illegal fishing practices on the lake itself.

== Demographics ==
As of 2011 Census of India, Pedapakavaram had a population of 4440. The total population constitute, 2203 males and 2237 females with a sex ratio of 1015 females per 1000 males. 426 children are in the age group of 0–6 years, with sex ratio of 945 The average literacy rate stands at 72.30%.
