= Gonuguntla Suryanarayana =

Indian politician

Gonuguntla Suryanarayana (born 1967) is an Indian politician from Andhra Pradesh. He was a former member of the Andhra Pradesh Legislative Assembly from Dharmavaram Assembly constituency in Anantapur district representing the Telugu Desam Party.

== Early life ==
Suryanarayana is from Dharmavaram, Anantapur district, Andhra Pradesh. He is the son of G. Narayana Swamy. He completed his intermediate at Government Junior College, Dharmavaram in 1984. He runs his own business and declared assets worth Rs.47 crore in 2014 and Rs.72 crore in 2019 in his affidavits to the Election Commission of India.

== Career ==
Suryanarayana won from Dharmavaram Assembly constituency in the 2014 Andhra Pradesh Legislative Assembly election representing the Telugu Desam Party. He polled 99,246 votes and defeated his nearest rival, Kethireddy Venkatarami Reddy of the YSR Congress Party, by a margin of 14,211 votes. Earlier, in the 2009 election, he lost to Reddy by a margin of 19,172 votes. In 2019, he joined the Bharatiya Janata Party.

In February 2024, he was arrested by the police when he tried to get the potholes in the town's roads filled at his own expense.
