= Chandrala, Mylavaram mandal =

Village in Krishna district (Andhra Pradesh), India

Chandrala
- Village
- Interactive map of Chandrala
- Location in Andhra Pradesh, India
- Coordinates: 16.75°N 80.69°E
- Country: India
- State: Andhra Pradesh
- District: NTR
- Mandal: Mylavaram

Area
  - Total: 11.51 km^{2} (4.44 sq mi)

Population (2011)
  - Total: 4,100

Languages
  - Official: Telugu
- Time zone: UTC+5:30 (IST)
- PIN: 521230
- Vehicle registration: AP–16

Chandrala is a village in NTR district of the Indian state of Andhra Pradesh. It is located in Mylavaram mandal of Vijayawada revenue division. It is one of the villages in the mandal to be a part of Andhra Pradesh Capital Region.

== Demographics ==
As of 2011 census, Chandrala had a population of 4,100. The total population constitute, 2,067 males and 2,033 females —a sex ratio of 984 females per 1000 males. 435 children are in the age group of 0–6 years, of which 227 are boys and 208 are girls. The average literacy rate stands at 63.57% with 2,330 literates, significantly higher than the state average of 67.41%.

== Economy ==
Horticultural crops are the major cultivation which includes a major share of mangoes and others like banana, coconut, palm oil etc.

== Transport ==
Nuzvid–Mylavaram road passes through the village, providing connectivity with nearby towns.

== See also ==
- Villages in Mylavaram mandal
