= Dulam Nageswara Rao =

Indian politician (born 1959)

Member of Legislative Assembly, Andhra Pradesh
- In office 2019–2024
- Preceded by: Kamineni Srinivas
- Succeeded by: Kamineni Srinivas
- Constituency: Kaikalur

Personal details
- Born: 1959 (age 66–67) Kaikalur
- Party: YSR Congress Party
- Spouse: Veera Kumari
- Occupation: Politician

Dulam Nageswara Rao (born 1959) is an Indian politician from Andhra Pradesh. He won the 2019 Andhra Pradesh Legislative Assembly Election on YSR Congress Party ticket from Kaikalur Constituency in the erstwhile Krishna district. He is re-nominated by YSRCP to contest from the Kaikalur seat in the 2024 Assembly Election. On 22 April 2024, he filed his nomination papers for the 2024 election.

== Early life and education ==
He hails from Kaikalur, Krishna district. His father is Veeranna. He married Veera Kumari. He completed his 7th Class from Zilla Parishad Oriental High School, Kaikalur in 1969. He is a businessman and belongs to Kapu community.

== Career ==
Rao started his political career with Indian National Congress. Later, he joined YSRCP and won the Kaikalur seat in the 2019 Andhra Pradesh Legislative Assembly Election defeating Jayamangala Venkata Ramana of Telugu Desam Party by a margin of 9,357 votes. Rao polled 82,128 votes against 72,771 votes polled by Venkata Ramana, who later joined YSRCP in February 2023 in the presence of Rao. Along with his wife, Veera Kumari, Rao has taken up door-to-door campaigning in the district which has a huge population from Dalit and BC communities. The Constituency is now part of the new Eluru district and comes under the Eluru Lok Sabha Constituency.
