= Madivada =

Madivada may refer to:

- Tejaswi Madivada
- Madivada, West Godavari
