= Chandragudem =

- Village
- Interactive map of Chandragudem
- Location in Andhra Pradesh, India
- Country: India
- State: Andhra Pradesh
- District: NTR

Area
  - Total: 15.50 km^{2} (5.98 sq mi)

Population (2019)
  - Total: 7,520
  - Density: 485/km^{2} (1,260/sq mi)

Languages
  - Official: Telugu
- Time zone: UTC+5:30 (IST)
- PIN: 521230
- Vehicle registration: AP–16
- Lok Sabha constituency: Vijayawada
- Vidhan Sabha constituency: Mylavaram

Chandragudem is a village in NTR district of the Indian state of Andhra Pradesh. It is located in Mylavaram mandal of Vijayawada revenue division. It is one of the villages in the mandal to be a part of Andhra Pradesh Capital Region.

== Geography ==
Borragudem, Sabjapadu, Jangalapalli, and Kotha Chandragudem are sub-villages of Chandragudem.

== Education ==
There are four schools in Chandragudem, three primary and one primary and secondary. ZPS and ZPHS School is an upper primary, secondary and upper secondary government school, founded in 1984. MPPS School in Borragudem is a governmental primary school, run at the mandal level and was established in 1970. MPPS School in Chandragudem is a government primary school, run at the mandal level and was established in 1967. RCM School is a private primary school that receives government assistance and was established in the year 1939. Sarada UPS School is a private primary and upper primary school that receives no governmental assistance and was founded in 2002.

== Politics ==
- The politics in Chandragudem village are highly influenced by the telugu Desam party ).
