= Cherukumilli =

- Village
- Interactive map of Cherukumilli
- Country: India
- State: Andhra Pradesh
- District: West Godavari

Population (2011)
  - Total: 3,750

Languages
  - Official: Telugu
- Time zone: UTC+5:30 (IST)
- Vehicle registration: AP

Cherukumilli is a village in Akividu mandal, located in West Godavari district of Indian state of Andhra Pradesh.

== Demographics ==
As of 2011 Census of India, Cherukumilli had a population of 3750. The total population constitute, 1861 males and 1889 females with a sex ratio of 1015 females per 1000 males. 330 children are in the age group of 0–6 years, with sex ratio of 941. The average literacy rate stands at 69.82%.
