= Alapadu =

- village
- Interactive map of Alapadu
- Location in Andhra Pradesh, India
- Coordinates: 16°34′50″N 81°19′19″E
- Country: India
- State: Andhra Pradesh
- District: Eluru

Population (20)
  - Total: 2,088

Languages
  - Official: Telugu
- Time zone: UTC+5:30 (IST)
- Vehicle registration: AP-
- Nearest city: AKIVIDU, KAIKALUR AND BHIMAVARAM
- Lok Sabha constituency: ELURU

Alapadu is a village in Eluru district of the Indian state of Andhra Pradesh. It is located in Kaikalur mandal of Eluru revenue division.
