= Satya Kumar Yadav =

Indian politician

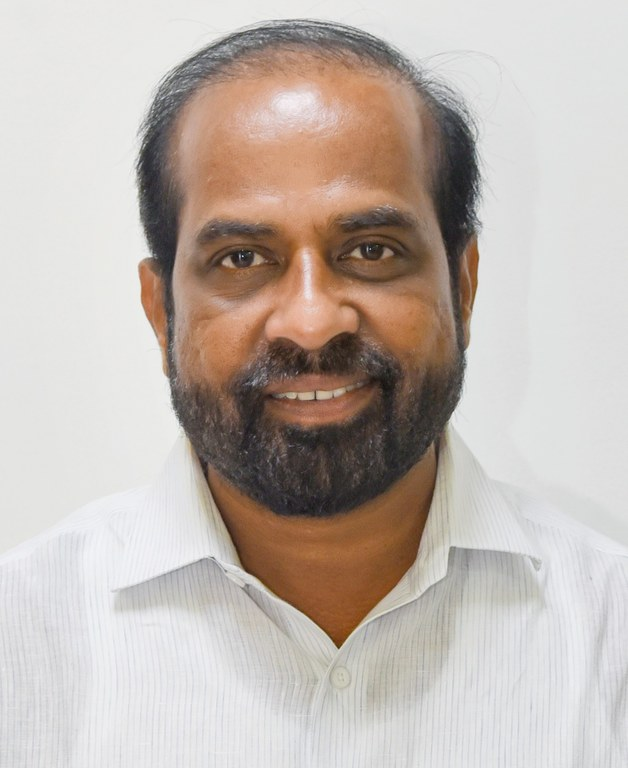

Minister of Health, Family Welfare and Medical Education Government of Andhra Pradesh
- Incumbent
- Assumed office 12 June 2024
- Governor: S. Abdul Nazeer
- Chief Minister: N. Chandrababu Naidu
- Preceded by: Vidadala Rajini

Member of Legislative Assembly Andhra Pradesh
- Incumbent
- Assumed office 4 June 2024
- Preceded by: Kethireddy Venkatarami Reddy
- Constituency: Dharmavaram

Personal details
- Born: 16 September 1971 (age 54) Gadekallu, Anantapur District, Andhra Pradesh, India
- Party: Bharatiya Janata Party
- Occupation: Politician

Satya Kumar Yadav is an Indian politician from Andhra Pradesh and Minister of Health, Family Welfare and Medical Education in Government of Andhra Pradesh. He has been a member of the Bharatiya Janata Party. He won the 2024 Andhra Pradesh Legislative Assembly election from Dharmavaram Assembly Constituency.

== Early life ==
Satyakumar Yadav was born in Gadekallu of Vidapanakallu mandal of Anantapur district. He completed his schooling in Proddutur, Kadapa District and Nagarkurnool, Telangana and completed his engineering in Electronics Communications. He completed his master's degree in political science from Madurai Kamaraj University and Business Administration from ITM, Chennai.

== Political career ==
Satya Kumar joined as personal assistant to M. Venkaiah Naidu in 1993 and worked as private secretary, additional private secretary and senior private secretary. He also served as OSD for a few days when Venkaiah Naidu was the vice president, and returned to state politics in 2021. He joined TDP and was appointed party's National Secretary in 2018. He worked as party observer in Kerala and Karnataka assembly elections and as joint in-charge of Uttar Pradesh state and Andaman-Nicobar in-charge on behalf of BJP.

In 2024 he contested as BJP candidate from Dharmavaram constituency of Anantapur district and won the election by narrow margin of just 3,734 votes and has taken oath as minister in Fourth N. Chandrababu Naidu ministry on 12 July 2024.

== Positions held ==
- BJP National General Secretary (2018 - Incumbent)
- Uttar Pradesh Party in-charge
- In-charge of Andaman Nicobar Islands
