= Chinakapavaram =

- village
- Interactive map of Chinakapavaram
- Location of Achanta mandal in Andhra Pradesh, India Chinakapavaram (India)
- Coordinates: 16.633939°N 81.416236°E
- Country: India
- State: Andhra Pradesh
- District: West Godavari
- Mandal: Akividu

Population (2011)
  - Total: 3,111

Languages
  - Official: Telugu
- Time zone: UTC+5:30 (IST)
- PIN: 534 235
- Telephone code: 08812

Chinakapavaram is a village in West Godavari district in the state of Andhra Pradesh in India.

== Demographics ==
As of 2011 India census, Chinakapavaram has a population of 3111 of which 1573 are males while 1538 are females. The average sex ratio of Chinakapavaram village is 978. The child population is 322, which makes up 10.35% of the total population of the village, with sex ratio 940. In 2011, the literacy rate of Chinakapavaram village was 70.96% when compared to 67.02% of Andhra Pradesh.

== See also ==
- West Godavari district
