= Kamineni Srinivas =

Indian politician

Minister of Health and Medical Education Government of Andhra Pradesh
- In office 8 June 2014 – 9 March 2018
- Chief Minister: N. Chandrababu Naidu
- Constituency: Kaikalur

Member of Andhra Pradesh Legislative Assembly
- Incumbent
- Assumed office 4 June 2024
- Chief Minister: N. Chandrababu Naidu
- Preceded by: Dulam Nageswara Rao
- Constituency: Kaikalur
- In office 16 May 2014 – 23 May 2019
- Preceded by: Jayamangala Venkata Ramana
- Succeeded by: Dulam Nageswara Rao
- Constituency: Kaikalur

Personal details
- Born: Andhra Pradesh, India
- Party: Bharatiya Janata Party
- Cabinet: Government of Andhra Pradesh

Kamineni Srinivas is a member of the Bharatiya Janata Party from Andhra Pradesh. He has won the 2014 Andhra Pradesh Legislative Assembly election and 2024 Andhra Pradesh Legislative Assembly election from Kaikalur.

He won with 88,092 votes in Assembly Election in Krishna district by a margin of 21,571 compared to his political rival Ram Prasad Uppala of YSR Congress Party. He also won in 2024 Assembly elections in Eluru district by a margin of 45, 273 compared to his political rival DNR. He was the Health Minister of Andhra Pradesh from 2014 - March 2018. In his tenure he carried out many reforms in Health Ministry.
