= Peddintlamma Temple, Kolletikota =

Peddintlamma Temple
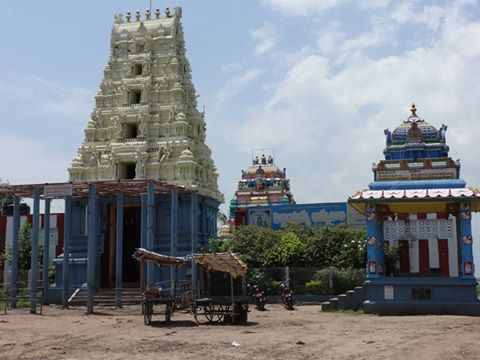
- Sri Peddintlamma Temple in Kolletikota

- Location in Andhra Pradesh

Religion
- Affiliation: Hinduism
- District: Eluru
- Deity: Peddintlamma or Perrantalu

Location
- Location: Kolletikota
- State: Andhra Pradesh
- Country: India
- Interactive map of Peddintlamma Temple
- Coordinates: 16.6276°N 81.2893°E

Architecture
- Type: Kalinga Architecture, South Indian

Peddintlamma Temple is a Hindu pilgrimage site. It is located on the shores of Kolleru Lake in Kolletikota of Eluru district in Andhra Pradesh. The temple was built in the 13th century by an Eastern Ganga Dynasty Army General during the reign of the Eastern Ganga king Narasingha Deva I.

== Legends ==
In the 13th century, Kolletikota region was under the reign of the Eastern Ganga monarchs, who ruled from the capital at Cuttack in Odisha. One of his forts was located at Kolletikota. His enemy, Muhammadin, was encamped at Chigurukota on the shores of Kolleru Lake. When war broke out between the Gajapati and Muhammadin, the Odia army general sacrificed his own daughter, Peddintlamma (also known as Perrantalu), to appease the gods and ensure his success. Finally, Odia forces won the war and the Army General built a temple dedicated to his daughter named Peddintlamma.
