= Kuppanapudi =

- Village
- Interactive map of Kuppanapudi
- Location in Andhra Pradesh, India Kuppanapudi (India)
- Coordinates: 16°33′59″N 81°23′48″E
- Country: India
- State: Andhra Pradesh
- District: West Godavari

Languages
  - Official: Telugu
- Time zone: UTC+5:30 (IST)
- PIN: 534235
- Telephone code: 08816
- Vehicle registration: AP-37
- Nearest city: Bhimavaram
- Lok Sabha constituency: Narsapuram
- Vidhan Sabha constituency: Undi
- Climate: cool (Köppen)
- Website: www.kuppanapudiinfo.com

Kuppanapudi is a village in Akividu mandal of West Godavari district in the Indian state of Andhra Pradesh. Most of the people depend on agriculture. It is located between the mandal towns Akiveedu and Kalla. It is famous for Roaster fights.

== Demographics ==
As of 2011 Census of India, Kuppanapudi had a population of 3998. The total population constitutes 1997 males and 2001 females with a sex ratio of 1002 females per 1000 males. 371 children are in the age group of 0–6 years, with sex ratio of 903. The average literacy rate stands at 67.16%.
