= Kollaparru =

- village
- Interactive map of Kollaparru
- Location of Achanta mandal in Andhra Pradesh, India Kollaparru (India)
- Coordinates: 16.619579°N 81.388131°E
- Country: India
- State: Andhra Pradesh
- District: West Godavari
- Mandal: Akividu

Population (2011)
  - Total: 2,894

Languages
  - Official: Telugu
- Time zone: UTC+5:30 (IST)
- PIN: 534 235
- Telephone code: 08816

Kollaparru is a village in West Godavari district in the state of Andhra Pradesh in India. Cherukuvada railway Station and Akividu railway Station are the nearest train stations.

== Demographics ==
As of 2011 India census, Kollaparru has a population of 2894 of which 1479 are males while 1415 are females. The average sex ratio of Kollaparru village is 957. The child population is 276, which makes up 9.54% of the total population of the village, with sex ratio 816 which is significantly lower than state average. In 2011, the literacy rate of Kollaparru village was 69.52% when compared to 67.02% of Andhra Pradesh.

== See also ==
- West Godavari district
