= Taratava =

- village
- Interactive map of Taratava
- Location of Achanta mandal in Andhra Pradesh, India Taratava (India)
- Coordinates: 16.616299°N 81.408992°E
- Country: India
- State: Andhra Pradesh
- District: West Godavari
- Mandal: Akividu

Population (2011)
  - Total: 640

Languages
  - Official: Telugu
- Time zone: UTC+5:30 (IST)
- PIN: 534 235
- Telephone code: 08812

Taratava is a village in West Godavari district in the state of Andhra Pradesh in India.

== Demographics ==
As of 2011 India census, Taratava has a population of 640 of which 339 are males while 301 are females. The average sex ratio of Taratava village is 888. The child population is 68, which makes up 10.63% of the total population of the village, with sex ratio 581, significantly lower than state average. In 2011, the literacy rate of Taratava village was 72.38% when compared to 67.02% of Andhra Pradesh.

== See also ==
- West Godavari district
