= Kaikaluru =

- Village
- Interactive map of Kaikaluru
- Location in Andhra Pradesh, India
- Coordinates: 16.55089°N 81.2000°E
- Country: India
- State: Andhra Pradesh
- District: Eluru
- Elevation: 18 m (59 ft)

Population (2011)
  - Total: 21,292

Languages
  - Official: Telugu
- Time zone: UTC+5:30 (IST)
- PIN: 521333
- Telephone code: +91–8677
- Vehicle registration: AP–16
- Literacy: 66.55%
- Lok Sabha constituency: Eluru
- Vidhan Sabha constituency: Kaikalur
- Website: https://www.kaikalur.com/

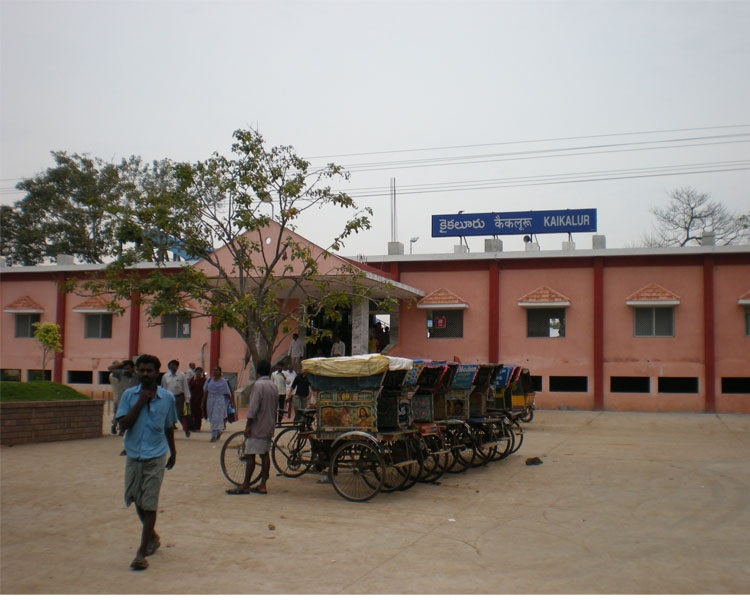
Kaikaluru Railway Station

Kaikaluru is a village in Eluru district of the Indian state of Andhra Pradesh. Kaikalur is home to Kolleru Lake, one of the largest freshwater lakes in India, covering about 90,100 hectares and is a tourist attraction.

== Geography ==
Kaikalur is located at 16.5667°N 81.2000°E. It has an average elevation of 18 m (59 ft). Sri Syamalamba temple is one of the famous temples there.

== Demographics ==
As of 2011, the town had a population of 21,292, comprising 10,692 males, 10,600 females and 2,097 children aged 0–6. The average literacy rate was 78.46%, comprising 15,060 people, significantly higher than the national average of 73.00%.

== Transportation ==
=== Nearest railway stations ===
Kaikaluru railway station is the main railway station, located on the Vijayawada-Nidadavolu branch railway line.

Kaikaluru railway station is categorized as a Non-Suburban Grade-5 (NSG-5) station in the Vijayawada railway division.

=== National Highways ===
NH165 from Pamarru to Palakollu passes through Kaikaluru, and is a Spur road of NH65 at Pamarru ending at Palakollu.

=== Public bus services ===
APSRTC operates bus services from Kaikaluru to Eluru, Machilipatnam, Vijayawada, Bhimavaram, Narasapuram, Palakollu, Razolu, Kakinada, Srikakulam, Palasa, Visakhapatnam, Gudivada, Mudinepalli and Hyderabad.

== Tourist destinations ==
Kolleru Lake is the largest freshwater lake in India, situated between the Krishna and Godavari delta. The lake is fed directly by water from the seasonal Budameru and Tammileru streams. The lake is an important habitat for an estimated 20 million resident and migratory birds such as the grey or spot-billed pelican. It was designated as a wetland of international importance in November 2002 under the international Ramsar Convention.

== Temples ==
- Sri Syamalamba Temple
- Sri Vasavi Kanyakaparameswari Temple
- Sri Pothuluri Veera Brahmendra Swamy Temple
- Sai Baba Temple
- Venkateswara Swamy Temple (Meesala Venkanna)

== See also ==
- Villages in Kaikalur mandal
- Kolleru Lake
- Kolleru Bird Sanctuary
