= Ajjamuru =

- village
- Interactive map of Ajjamuru
- Location of Akividu mandal in Andhra Pradesh, India Ajjamuru (India)
- Coordinates: 16.582814°N 81.396552°E
- Country: India
- State: Andhra Pradesh
- District: West Godavari
- Mandal: Akividu

Population (2011)
  - Total: 1,811

Languages
  - Official: Telugu
- Time zone: UTC+5:30 (IST)
- PIN: 534 235
- Telephone code: 08816

Ajjamuru is a village in West Godavari district in the state of Andhra Pradesh in India. akiveedu railway station is the nearest Railway Station.

== Demographics ==
As of 2011 India census, Ajjamuru has a population of 1811 of which 954 are males while 857 are females. The average sex ratio of Ajjamuru village is 898. The child population is 136, which makes up 7.51% of the total population of the village, with sex ratio 659. In 2011, the literacy rate of Ajjamuru village was 77.91% when compared to 67.02% of Andhra Pradesh.

== See also ==
- West Godavari district
