= A.I.Bheemavaram =

- village
- Interactive map of A.I.Bheemavaram
- Location of Achanta mandal in Andhra Pradesh, India A.I.Bheemavaram (India)
- Coordinates: 16.562081°N 81.374295°E
- Country: India
- State: Andhra Pradesh
- District: West Godavari
- Mandal: Akividu

Population (2011)
  - Total: 4,554

Languages
  - Official: Telugu
- Time zone: UTC+5:30 (IST)
- PIN: 534 235
- Telephone code: 08812

A.I.Bheemavaram is a village in West Godavari district in the state of Andhra Pradesh in India.

== Demographics ==
As of 2011 India census, A.I.Bheemavaram has a population of 4554 of which 2253 are males while 2301 are females. The average sex ratio of A.I.Bheemavaram village is 1021. The child population is 381, which makes up 8.37% of the total population of the village, with sex ratio 1071. In 2011, the literacy rate of A.I.Bheemavaram village was 65.71% when compared to 67.02% of Andhra Pradesh.

== See also ==
- West Godavari district
