= Siddapuram, Akividu mandal =

Siddapuram
- village
- Interactive map of Siddapuram
- Location of Achanta mandal in Andhra Pradesh, India Siddapuram (India)
- Coordinates: 16.614271°N 81.349809°E
- Country: India
- State: Andhra Pradesh
- District: West Godavari
- Mandal: Akividu

Population (2011)
  - Total: 6,312

Languages
  - Official: Telugu
- Time zone: UTC+5:30 (IST)
- PIN: 534 235
- Telephone code: 08812

Siddapuram is a village in West Godavari district in the state of Andhra Pradesh in India.

== Demographics ==
Siddapuram has a population of 6,312 according to the 2011 Indian census: 3,170 males and 3,142 females. The average sex ratio of Siddapuram village is 991. The child population is 619, which makes up 9.81% of the total population of the village, with sex ratio 1043. In 2011, the literacy rate of Siddapuram village was 67.61% when compared to 67.02% of Andhra Pradesh.

== See also ==
- West Godavari district
