= Pondugula =

- Village
- Interactive map of Pondugula
- Location in Andhra Pradesh, India
- Coordinates: 16.7706°N 80.6182°E
- Country: India
- State: Andhra Pradesh
- District: NTR
- Mandal: Mylavaram

Area
  - Total: 21.88 km^{2} (8.45 sq mi)

Population (2011)
  - Total: 4,362
  - Density: 199.4/km^{2} (516.3/sq mi)

Languages
  - Official: Telugu
- Time zone: UTC+5:30 (IST)
- PIN: 521230
- Vehicle registration: AP

Pondugula is a village in NTR district of the Indian state of Andhra Pradesh. It is located in Mylavaram mandal of Vijayawada revenue division. It is the second largest village in Mylavaram mandal.

== History ==
A Buddhist site potentially from the Satavahana or Ikshvaku dynasties has been uncovered near the village. The site features marble pillars with lotus medallion engravings, resembling those of the Amaravati School of Art. Artifacts include large Satavahana bricks, suggesting the site may have been used for constructing a stupa, vihara, or chaitya. A large water tank filled with lotus flowers near the site indicates it may date back to the 1st to 3rd centuries A.D. The discovery also includes a brick mound with rock-cut cisterns, potentially indicating another stupa. Recommendations have been made for the Archaeological Survey of India to protect the site and relocate the marble pillars for preservation.
