= Dumpagadapa =

- village
- Interactive map of Dumpagadapa
- Location in Andhra Pradesh, India
- Coordinates: 16.59895°N 81.36885°E
- Country: India
- State: Andhra Pradesh
- District: West Godavari
- Elevation: 2 m (6.6 ft)

Population (2001)
  - Total: 5,289

Languages
  - Official: Telugu
- Time zone: UTC+5:30 (IST)
- PIN: 534235
- Telephone code: 08816
- Vehicle registration: AP-37
- Nearest city: Eluru
- Sex ratio: 1 : 0.966 ♂/♀
- Lok Sabha constituency: Narsapuram
- Vidhan Sabha constituency: Undi
- Climate: hot (Köppen)

Dumpagadapa is a village and panchayat under Akividu mandal located in the West Godavari district, Andhra Pradesh, India.

== Demographics ==
As of 2011 Census of India, Dumpagadapa had a population of 5467. The total population constitute, 2769 males and 2698 females with a sex ratio of 974 females per 1000 males. 550 children are in the age group of 0–6 years, with sex ratio of 937. The average literacy rate stands at 69.74%.

== Education ==
The village includes the V. V. Giri Government Degree College, founded 1974.

== Archaeology ==
The village is located approximately 14 miles from Bhimavaram, and has a brick temple with a stone statue, dedicated to Varadarajasvami. The building was believed by Raj researchers to date to the 15th-16th century, and has a pillar with an inscription dated 1153 AD.
