= Dharmavaram Assembly constituency =

Constituency of the Andhra Pradesh Legislative Assembly, India

Coordinates: 14.42°N 77.72°E

Dharmavaram
- Constituency No. 160 for the Andhra Pradesh Legislative Assembly
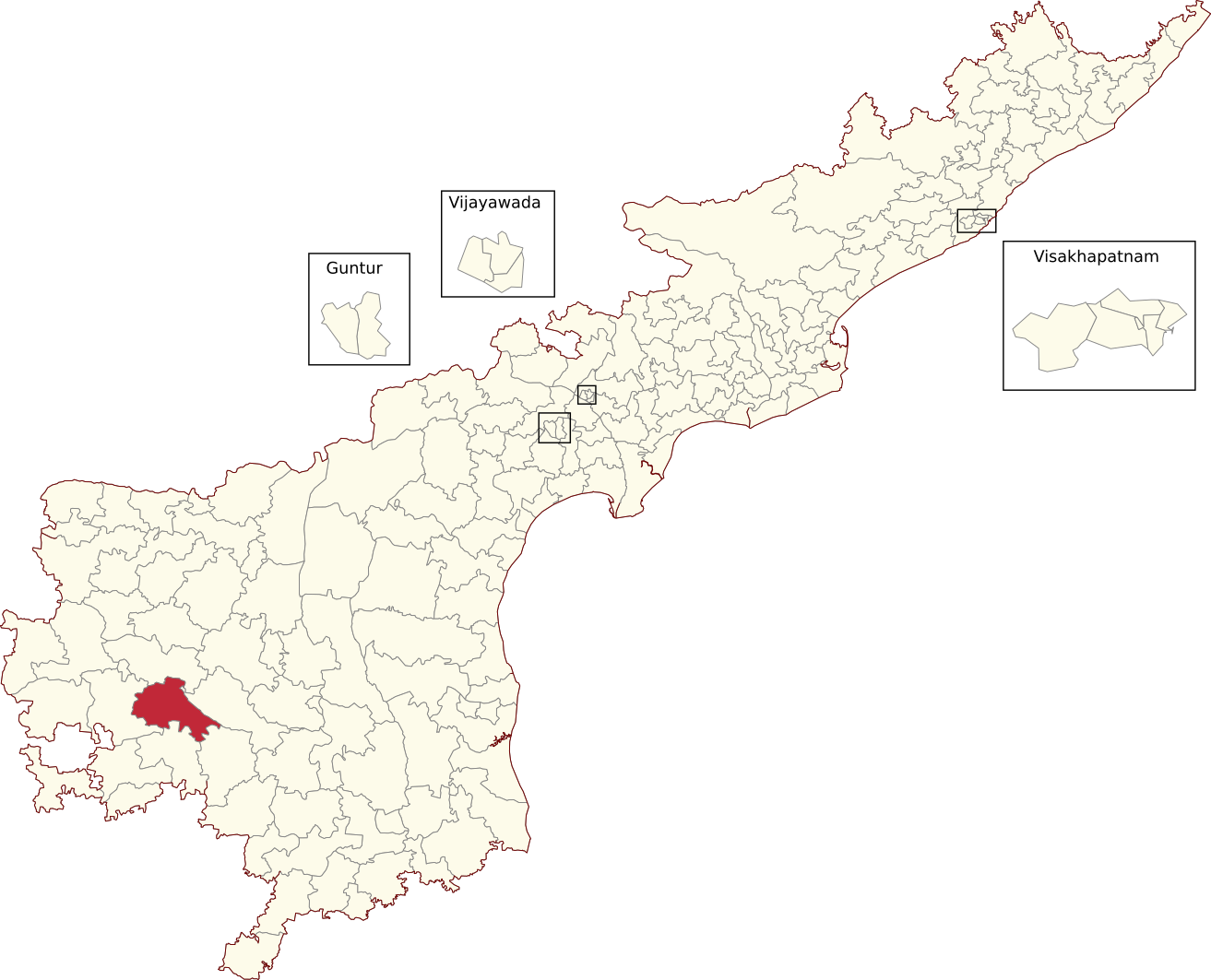
- Location of Dharmavaram Assembly constituency within Andhra Pradesh

Constituency details
- Country: India
- Region: South India
- State: Andhra Pradesh
- District: Sri Sathya Sai
- Lok Sabha constituency: Hindupur
- Established: 1951
- Total electors: 240,323
- Reservation: None

Member of Legislative Assembly
- 16th Andhra Pradesh Legislative Assembly
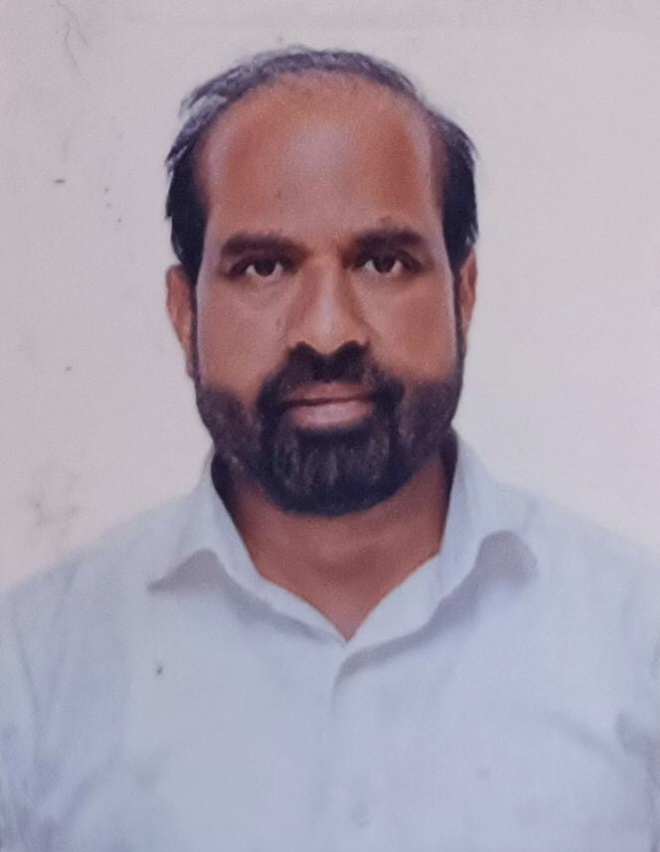
- Incumbent Satya Kumar Yadav
- Party: BJP
- Alliance: NDA
- Elected year: 2024

Dharmavaram Assembly constituency is a constituency in Sri Sathya Sai district of Andhra Pradesh that elects representatives to the Andhra Pradesh Legislative Assembly in India. It is one of the seven assembly segments of Hindupur Lok Sabha constituency.

Satya Kumar Yadav is the current MLA of the constituency, having won the 2024 from Bharatiya Janata Party. As of 2019, there are a total of 240,323 electors in the constituency. The constituency was established in 1951, as per the Delimitation Orders (1951).

== Mandals ==
Mandal
Dharmavaram
Bathalapalle
Tadimarri
Mudigubba

== Members of the Legislative Assembly ==
Year	Name	Party
1952	Srinivasalu Kasetty	Kisan Mazdoor Praja Party
1955	Ramachariu Pappoor	Indian National Congress
1962	Pallem Venkateswara Chowdary	Indian National Congress
1967	Pallem Venkateswara Chowdary	Indian National Congress
1972	Pallem Venkateswara Chowdary	Indian National Congress
1978	Gonuguntla Ananathareddy	Indian National Congress
1983	Garudammagari Nagireddy	Telugu Desam Party
1985	Garudammagari Nagireddy	Telugu Desam Party
1989	Garudammagari Nagireddy	Telugu Desam Party
1994	Guta Venkata Naidu	Telugu Desam Party
1999	Kethireddy Surya Pratap Reddy	Indian National Congress
2004	Gonuguntla Jayalakshmamma	Telugu Desam Party
2009	Kethireddy Venkatarami Reddy	Indian National Congress
2014	Gonuguntla Suryanarayana	Telugu Desam Party
2019	Kethireddy Venkatarami Reddy	YSR Congress Party
2024	Satya Kumar Yadav	Bharatiya Janata Party

== Election results ==
=== 2024 ===
2024 Andhra Pradesh Legislative Assembly election: Dharmavaram
Party	Candidate	Votes	%	±%
BJP	Satya Kumar Yadav	106,544	48.46	
YSRCP	Kethireddy Venkatarami Reddy	102,810	46.76	
INC	Rangana Aswartha Narayana	3,758	1.71	
NOTA	None of the Above	1,787	0.81	
Majority		3,734	1.70	
Turnout		219,848	89.36	
BJP gain from YSRCP		Swing		

=== 2019 ===
2019 Andhra Pradesh Legislative Assembly election: Dharmavara
Party	Candidate	Votes	%	±%
YSRCP	Kethireddy Venkatarami Reddy	106,909	50.74	
TDP	Gonuguntla Suryanarayana	91,243	43.31	
JSP	Chilakam Madhusudhana Reddy	6,668	3.17	
NOTA	None of the Above	1,767	0.84	
INC	Rangana Aswartha Narayana	1,662	0.79	
BJP	E. Sudarshan Reddy	622	0.30	
Majority		15,666	7.43	
Turnout		210,679	87.58	
YSRCP gain from TDP		Swing		

=== 2014 ===
2014 Andhra Pradesh Legislative Assembly election: Dharmavaram
Party	Candidate	Votes	%	±%
TDP	Gonuguntla Suryanarayana	99,246	52.14	
YSRCP	Kethireddy Venkatarami Reddy	85,035	44.68	
INC	Rangana Aswarthanarayana	1,565	0.82	
NOTA	None of the Above	954	0.50	
Majority		14,211	7.47	
Turnout		190,329	84.43	
TDP gain from INC		Swing		

=== 2009 ===
2009 Andhra Pradesh Legislative Assembly election: Dharmavaram
Party	Candidate	Votes	%	±%
INC	Kethireddy Venkatarami Reddy	61,260	41.19	
IND	G. Suryanarayana	42,088	28.30	
PRP	G. Sadhasiva Reddy	20,691	13.91	
CPI	Deveragudi Jagadeesh	6,480	4.36	
BJP	Kacharla Kanchenna	3,947	2.65	
IND	Madana Ramanjineyulu	2,249	1.51	
Majority		19,172	12.89	
Turnout		148,737	75.18	
INC gain from TDP		Swing		

=== 2004 ===
2004 Andhra Pradesh Legislative Assembly election: Dharmavaram
Party	Candidate	Votes	%	±%
TDP	Gonuguntla Jayalakshmamma	64,743	48.79	
CPI	G. Nagi Reddy	60,956	45.94	
IND	S. Jayasree	2,426	1.83	
Majority		3,787	2.85	
Turnout		132,681	71.41	
TDP gain from INC		Swing		

=== 1952 ===
1952 Madras Legislative Assembly election: Dharmavaram
Party	Candidate	Votes	%	±%
KMPP	Srinivasalu Kasetty	30,466	65.33%	
INC	Venkatareddy, Gonuguntla	14,394	30.87%	30.87%
Independent	Govindappa Jyoti	1,775	3.81%	
Margin of victory		16,072	34.46%	
Turnout		46,635	70.88%	
Registered electors		65,795		
KMPP win (new seat)				

== See also ==
- List of constituencies of Andhra Pradesh Legislative Assembly
