= Velagaleru =

Village in Andhra Pradesh, India

Coordinates: 16°39′N 80°37′E

Velagaleru is a village in NTR District, Andhra Pradesh, India. It is 15 km from Vijayawada. According to the 2011 Census, the population of the village was measured out to be 5,057 people.

== Gallery ==
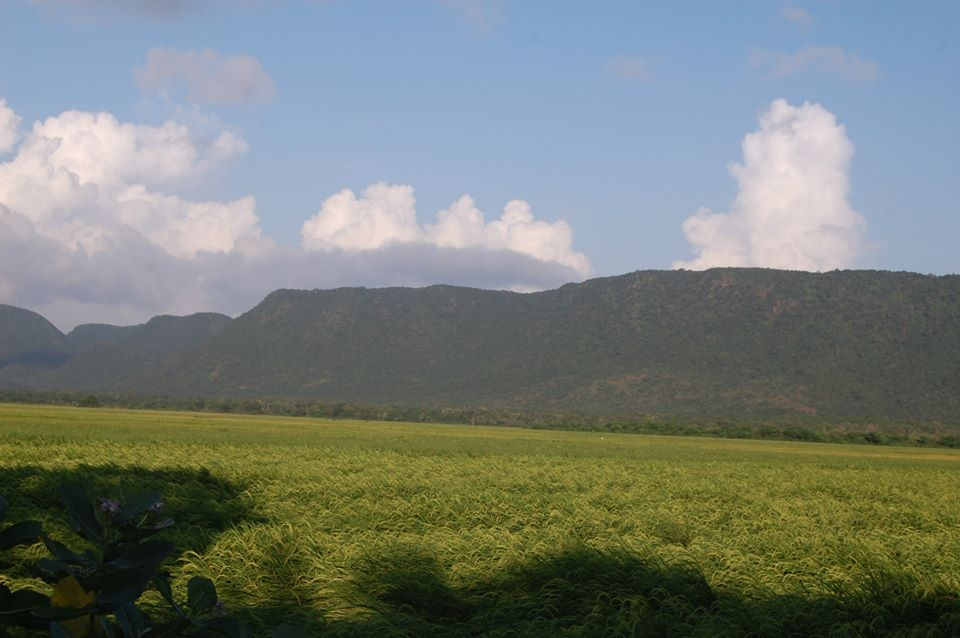
Velagaleru village

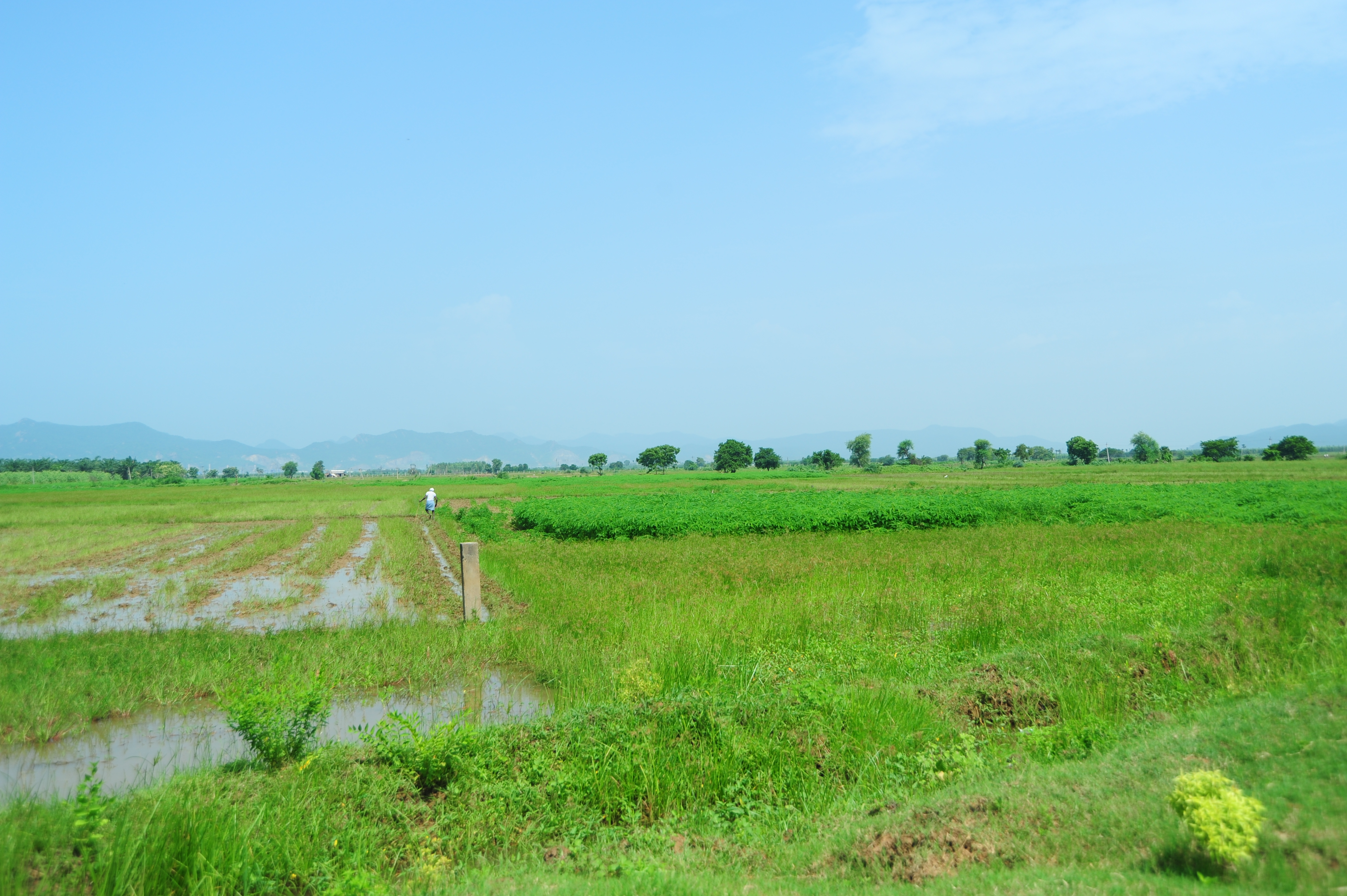
Velagaleru Farm fields
