= Madivada, West Godavari =

Madivada
- village
- Interactive map of Madivada
- Location of Achanta mandal in Andhra Pradesh, India Madivada (India)
- Coordinates: 16.619841°N 81.337555°E
- Country: India
- State: Andhra Pradesh
- District: West Godavari
- Mandal: Akividu

Population (2011)
  - Total: 6,896

Languages
  - Official: Telugu
- Time zone: UTC+5:30 (IST)
- PIN: 534 235
- Telephone code: 08812

Madivada is a village in West Godavari district in the state of Andhra Pradesh in India.

== Demographics ==
As of 2011 India census, Madivada has a population of 6896 of which 3455 are males while 3441 are females. The average sex ratio of Madivada village is 996. The child population is 653, which makes up 9.47% of the total population of the village, with sex ratio 973. In 2011, the literacy rate of Madivada village was 83.73% when compared to 67.02% of Andhra Pradesh.

== See also ==
- West Godavari district
