= Tammileru =

River in India

Coordinates: 16°44′N 81°05′E

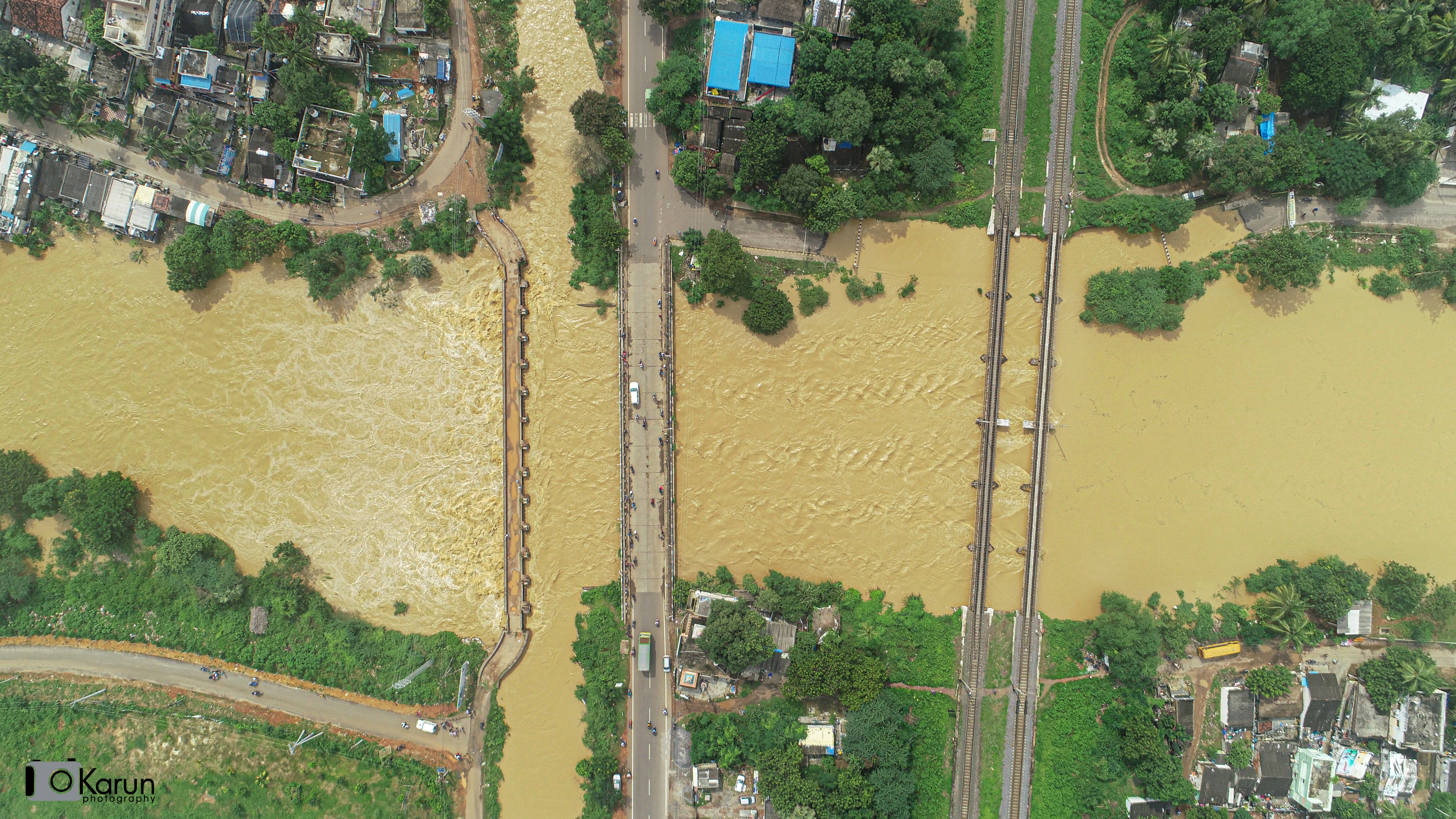
Western Locks near Eluru during 2020 floods

Tammileru is a medium river in Khammam district of Telangana and Eluru district of Andhra Pradesh state. The river drains into the Kolleru lake.

Tammileru dam was constructed in the year 1980 to irrigate 3,720 hectares of land.
