= Morusumilli =

Morusumilli Morusumalli
- Village
- Interactive map of Morusumilli
- Location in Andhra Pradesh, India
- Coordinates: 16.854670°N 80.575142°E
- Country: India
- State: Andhra Pradesh
- District: NTR
- Mandal: Mylavaram

Area
  - Total: 12.46 km^{2} (4.81 sq mi)

Population (2011)
  - Total: 3,832
  - Density: 307.5/km^{2} (796.5/sq mi)
  - Male: 1,931
  - Female: 1,901
- Demonym: Indian

Languages
  - Official: Telugu
- Time zone: UTC+5:30 (IST)
- PIN: 521230
- Vehicle registration: AP–16

Morusumilli also called Morusumalli is a village in Mylavaram mandal, NTR District in the Indian state of Andhra Pradesh. It belongs to Andhra region.

== Geography ==
It is located 99 km from district headquarters Machilipatnam, 279 km from Hyderabad, 15 km from sub-district headquarters Mylavaram, and 135 km from district headquarter Machilipatnam.

Morsumilli is north of G. Konduru Mandal, south of Reddigudem Mandal, west of Agiripalli Mandal and east of Yerrupalem Mandal.

Nuzvid, Vijayawada, Hanuman Junction and Mangalagiri are nearby cities.

Morusumilli is on the border between Krishna District and Khammam District. Khammam District Yerrupalem is west towards this place . It is near the Telangana.

== Transport ==
Road links are connect from Vijayawada to Morsumilli. Bus stations are located in Mylavaram, Madhira, Vijayawada.

== Education ==
=== Colleges ===
Nearby colleges include:

- Lakireddy Bali Reddy college of engineering, mylavaram (LBRCE)
- Govt Degree College Mylavaram
- Sri Rajah Svrgnr Jr College, Mylavaram
- Little Flower Jr College Mylavaram
- V V R Govt Jr College Mylavaram
- Sri Raja Svrgnr College of Arts & Science

=== Schools ===
- Viswabharathi Ups
- Mpups Morusumilli
