= Pallevada =

- Village
- Interactive map of Pallevada
- Location in Andhra Pradesh, India Pallevada (India)
- Coordinates: 16.5833°N 81.3000°E
- Country: India
- State: Andhra Pradesh
- District: Eluru
- Elevation: 20 m (66 ft)

Population (2001)
  - Total: 2,955

Languages
  - Official: Telugu
- Time zone: UTC+5:30 (IST)
- Nearest city: Vijayawada
- Lok Sabha constituency: Eluru
- Vidhan Sabha constituency: Kaikaluru
- Climate: Tropical (Köppen)

Pallevada is a village in Kaikaluru mandal of Eluru district, Andhra Pradesh, India.

== Geography ==
Pallevada is located at 16.5833°N 81.3000°E. It has an average elevation of 20 metres (68 ft).

== Demographics ==
According to Indian census, 2001, the demographic details of Pallevada village is as follows:

- Total Population: 2,955 in 726 Households
- Male Population: 1,499 and Female Population: 1,456
- Children Under 6-years of age: 358 (Boys - 187 and Girls - 171)
- Total Literates: 1,639
