= Dharmapuram =

- Village
- Interactive map of Dharmapuram
- Location in Andhra Pradesh, India Dharmapuram (India)
- Coordinates: 18°19′40.223″N 83°48′44.765″E
- Country: India
- State: Andhra Pradesh
- District: Srikakulam

Government
  - Type: panchayat
  - Body: Gramapanchayat

Languages
  - Official: Telugu
- Time zone: UTC+5:30 (IST)
- PIN: 532402
- Vehicle registration: AP-30
- Lok Sabha constituency: Srikakulam
- Vidhan Sabha constituency: Amadalavalasa

Dharmapuram is a village near Srikakulam town in Ponduru Mandal Division in Andhra Pradesh, India.
