= Kethireddy Venkatarami Reddy =

Indian politician

Member of Legislative Assembly Andhra Pradesh
- In office 23 May 2019 – June 2024
- Preceded by: Gonuguntla Suryanarayana
- Succeeded by: Y. Satyakumar Yadav
- Constituency: Dharmavaram
- In office 2009–2014
- Preceded by: Gonuguntla Lakshmamma
- Succeeded by: Goniguntla Suryanarayana
- Constituency: Dharmavaram

Personal details
- Born: 13 October 1978 (age 47)
- Party: YSRCP (2013-Present)
- Other political affiliations: INC (2009-2013)
- Parent: Kethireddy Surya Pratap Reddy (father)
- Relatives: Kethireddy Pedda Reddy (uncle)
- Education: Bharathiar University (2001)

Kethireddy Venkatarami Reddy (born 1978) is an Indian politician in the state of Andhra Pradesh. In the 2019 Andhra Pradesh Legislative Assembly Election he was elected as MLA from Dharmavaram constituency in the erstwhile Anantapur District of Andhra Pradesh which is renamed as Sri Sathya Sai district. He represented YSR Congress Party.

== Early life and education ==
Reddy was born in Dharmavaram to Surya Prathap Reddy. He studied Electrical Engineering from Bharathiar University in 2001 and later did his post graduation in UK upon which he returned to Hyderabad and had a brief stint with Reliance Industries as a Network Engineer before joining politics.

== Political career ==
Kethireddy started his political career with Indian Congress Party under the leadership of erstwhile Chief Minister of Andhra Pradesh Y. S. Rajasekhara Reddy and subsequently won the 2009 Andhra Pradesh Legislative Assembly Election from Dharmavaram Assembly Constituency, post the death of YSR, he resigned from Indian Congress Party and joined YSRCP at the guidance of Y. S. Jagan Mohan Reddy in 2011. He won the 2019 Andhra Pradesh Legislative Assembly Election from Dharmavaram Assembly Constituency representing YSR Congress. He defeated Gonuguntla Suryanarayana of Telugu Desam Party by a margin of 15,286 votes. He lost to BJP Contestant Satya Kumar Yadav in 2024 Andhra Pradesh Legislative Assembly election.

He is most known for "Good Morning Dharmavaram" program, it is an initiative organized by him. Through this program, he engages directly with constituents by touring various villages within his assembly constituency. The aim is to listen to their grievances and provide immediate solutions, often involving local officials to address issues on the spot. This program has been very successful and has garnered a positive image of Kethireddy as an approachable leader.
