= Gummuluru =

- village
- Interactive map of Gummuluru
- Location of Achanta mandal in Andhra Pradesh, India Gummuluru (India)
- Coordinates: 16.554298°N 81.778691°E
- Country: India
- State: Andhra Pradesh
- District: West Godavari
- Mandal: Poduru

Population (2011)
  - Total: 4,346

Languages
  - Official: Telugu
- Time zone: UTC+5:30 (IST)
- PIN: 534 235
- Telephone code: 08812
- Nearest city: Palakollu

Gummuluru is a village in West Godavari district in the state of Andhra Pradesh in India. The nearest railway station is Godavari(GVN) located at a distance of 12.41 Km.

== Demographics ==
As of 2011 India census, Gummuluru has a population of 4346 of which 2176 are males while 2170 are females. The average sex ratio of Gummuluru village is 997. The child population is 397, which makes up 9.13% of the total population of the village, with sex ratio 890. In 2011, the literacy rate of Gummuluru village was 63.56% when compared to 67.02% of Andhra Pradesh.

== See also ==
- West Godavari district
