= Bhujabalapatnam =

- Village
- Interactive map of Bhujabalapatnam
- Location in Andhra Pradesh, India Bhujabalapatnam (India)
- Coordinates: 16.58°N 81.27°E
- Country: India
- State: Andhra Pradesh
- Districts: Eluru

Population (2011)
  - Total: 6,046

Languages
  - Official: Telugu
- Time zone: UTC+5:30 (IST)
- PIN: 522403
- Telephone code: 91-8646
- Vehicle registration: AP

Bhujabalapatnam is a village in Kaikaluru mandal, located in Eluru district of Indian state of Andhra Pradesh.

== Government and politics ==
Bhujabalapatnam gram panchayat is the local self-government of the village. The elected members of the gram panchayat is headed by a sarpanch. The current president is Gurajala RamaTulasi.
