= Kolletikota =

- Village
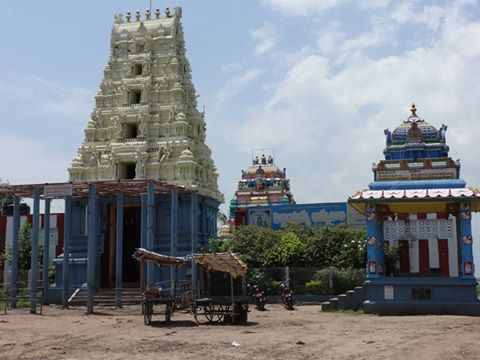
- Peddintlamma Temple in Kolletikota
- Interactive map of Kolletikota
- Location in Andhra Pradesh, India
- Coordinates: 16.626°N 81.289°E
- Country: India
- State: Andhra Pradesh
- District: Eluru
- Mandal: Kaikaluru
- Founder: Langula Gajapathi Raju

Area
  - Total: 10.96 km^{2} (4.23 sq mi)

Population (2011)
  - Total: 21,292
  - Density: 1,943/km^{2} (5,032/sq mi)

Languages
  - Official: Telugu
- Time zone: UTC+5:30 (IST)
- PIN: 521340

Kolletikota is a village in Eluru district of the Indian state of Andhra Pradesh. It is located in Kaikaluru mandal of Gudivada revenue division.

Kolletikota was the fort of Langula Gajapati (Langula Narasimha deva Gajapati) of Eastern Ganga dynasty of Odisha.

During conflicts with Muhammadin a Muslim Ruler encamped at Chigurukota on the shores of Kolleru Lake Muslim armies, the enemy attempted to drain the lake through the Upputeru channel to weaken the Gajapati defenses. Legend states that a royal general sacrificed his daughter, Perantala Kanama, to invoke divine protection, leading to the naming of the channel as “Perantala Kanama.” The Sri Peddinti Ammavari Temple at Kolleru stands as a cultural and religious symbol of this historical tradition.

== Culture ==
Peddintlamma Temple is the temple in the village.

== See also ==
- Villages in Kaikaluru mandal
