= Kaikalur Assembly constituency =

Constituency of the Andhra Pradesh Legislative Assembly, India

Coordinates: 16.55°N 81.21°E

Kaikalur
- Constituency No. 73 for the Andhra Pradesh Legislative Assembly
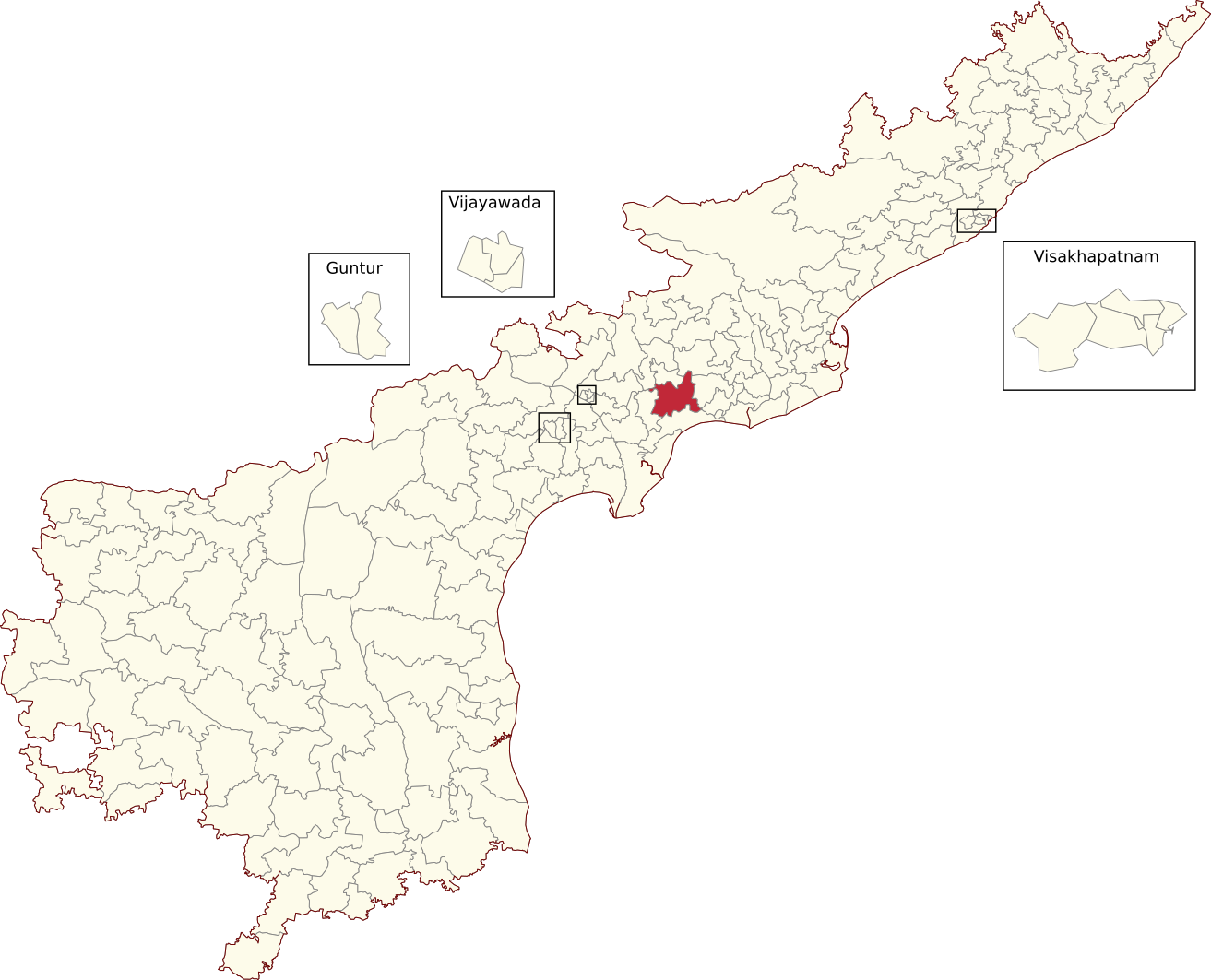
- Location of Kaikalur Assembly constituency within Andhra Pradesh

Constituency details
- Country: India
- Region: South India
- State: Andhra Pradesh
- District: Eluru
- Lok Sabha constituency: Eluru
- Established: 1951
- Total electors: 204,628
- Reservation: None

Member of Legislative Assembly
- 16th Andhra Pradesh Legislative Assembly
- Incumbent Kamineni Srinivas
- Party: BJP
- Alliance: NDA
- Elected year: 2024
- Preceded by: Dulam Nageswara Rao

Kaikalur Assembly constituency is a constituency in Eluru district of Andhra Pradesh that elects representatives to the Andhra Pradesh Legislative Assembly in India. It is one of the seven assembly segments of Eluru Lok Sabha constituency.

Kamineni Srinivas is the current MLA of the constituency, having won the 2024 Andhra Pradesh Legislative Assembly election from the Bharatiya Janata Party. As of 2019, there are a total of 204,628 electors in the constituency. The constituency was established in 1951, as per the Delimitation Orders (1951).

== Mandals ==
The four mandals that form the assembly constituency are:

Mandal
Mandavalli
Kaikalur
Kalidindi
Mudinepalli

== Members of the Legislative Assembly ==
Year	Member	Political party
1952	Adusumilli Venkata Subramanyam	Indian National Congress
1955	Kammili Appa Rao	Indian National Congress
1962	Kammili Appa Rao	Indian National Congress
1967	Chennamsetti Panduranga Rao	Independent
1972	Kammili Mangatayaramma	Indian National Congress
1978	Kanumuri Bapi Raju	Indian National Congress
1983	Kanumuri Bapi Raju	Indian National Congress
1985	Kanumuri Bapi Raju	Indian National Congress
1989	Kanumuri Bapi Raju	Indian National Congress
1994	Namburu Venkata Rama Raju	Indian National Congress
1999	Yerneni Raja Ramachandar	Independent
2004	Yerneni Raja Ramachandar	Indian National Congress
2009	Jayamangala Venkata Ramana	Telugu Desam Party
2014	Kamineni Srinivas	Bharatiya Janata Party
2019	Dulam Nageswara Rao	YSR Congress Party
2024	Kamineni Srinivas	Bharatiya Janata Party

== Election results ==
=== 1952 ===
1952 Madras Legislative Assembly election: Kaikalur
Party	Candidate	Votes	%	±%
INC	Adusumilli Venkatasubramanyam	17,952	37.23	37.23
CPI	Atluri Purnachalapathi Rao	17,836	36.99	
Independent	Parvathaneni Basavasankara Rao	9,408	19.51	
Independent	Garikimukka Asirvadam	1,151	2.39	
Independent	Motepalli Venkata Rangayya	590	1.22	
Socialist Party (India)	Gudipati Seetharamayya	518	1.07	
Independent	Kammili Appa Rao	391	0.81	
Independent	Tentu Satyanarayana	370	0.77	
Margin of victory		116	0.24	
Turnout		48,216	78.90	
Registered electors		61,110		
INC win (new seat)				

=== 2004 ===
2004 Andhra Pradesh Legislative Assembly election: Kaikalur
Party	Candidate	Votes	%	±%
INC	Yerneni Raja Ramachandar	54,140	48.98	+19.30
TDP	Kammili Vital Rao	52,084	47.12	+13.53
Majority		2,056	1.86	
Turnout		110,528	76.87	+3.70
INC gain from Independent		Swing		

=== 2009 ===
2009 Andhra Pradesh Legislative Assembly election: Kaikalur
Party	Candidate	Votes	%	±%
TDP	Jayamangala Venkata Ramana	50,346	40.00	−15.11
PRP	Kamineni Srinivas	49,372	31.39	
INC	Yerneni Raja Ramachandar	44,846	28.51	−20.47
Majority		974	0.62	
Turnout		157,295	91.00	+9.07
TDP hold		Swing		

=== 2014 ===
2014 Andhra Pradesh Legislative Assembly election: Kaikalur
Party	Candidate	Votes	%	±%
BJP	Kamineni Srinivas	88,092	53.80	
YSRCP	Ram Prasad Uppala	66,521	40.63	
NOTA	None of the above	790	0.48	
Majority		21,571	13.17	
Turnout		163,739	86.50	+0.56
BJP gain from TDP		Swing		

=== 2019 ===
2019 Andhra Pradesh Legislative Assembly election: Kaikalur
Party	Candidate	Votes	%	±%
YSRCP	Dulam Nageswara Rao	82,128	47.81	+7.18
TDP	Jayamangala Venkata Ramana	72,771	42.36	New
JSP	B. V. Rao	10,738	6.25	New
BJP	Keerthi Venkata Ramaprasad	1,701	0.99	−52.81
NOTA	None of the above	1,529	0.89	+0.41
Majority		9,357	5.43	+7.74
Turnout		1,72,366	88.04	+1.54
YSRCP gain from BJP		Swing		

=== 2024 ===
2024 Andhra Pradesh Legislative Assembly election: Kaikalur
Party	Candidate	Votes	%	±%
BJP	Kamineni Srinivas	109,280	60.38	+59.39
YSRCP	Dulam Nageswara Rao	64,007	35.36	−12.45
NOTA	None of the above	1,598	0.88	−0.01
Majority		45,273	25.01	24.58
Turnout		1,80,991		
BJP gain from YSRCP		Swing		

== See also ==
- List of constituencies of the Andhra Pradesh Legislative Assembly
