= Mylavaram mandal =

Mylavaram Mandal
- Mandal
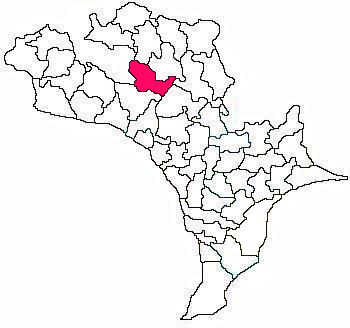
- Mandal map of NTR district
- Interactive Map Outlining Mylavaram mandal
- Location in Andhra Pradesh, India
- Coordinates: 16.7638°N 80.6382°E
- Country: India
- State: Andhra Pradesh
- District: NTR
- Headquarters: Mylavaram

Government
  - Body: Mandal Parishad

Languages
  - Official: Telugu
- Time zone: UTC+5:30 (IST)
- PIN: 521 xxx
- Vehicle registration: AP 16

Mylavaram mandal is one of the 20 mandals in the NTR district of the Indian state of Andhra Pradesh. It is under the administration of Vijayawada revenue division and the headquarters are located at Mylavaram town. It is one of mandals of the district located at the boundary of the state. Some of the villages in the mandal are part of the Andhra Pradesh Capital Region under the jurisdiction of APCRDA.

== Government and politics ==
Mylavaram mandal is under Mylavaram (Assembly constituency), which in turn represents Vijayawada (Lok Sabha constituency) of Andhra Pradesh. The present MLA representing Machilipatnam (Assembly constituency) is Vasantha Krishna Prasad of Telugu Desam Party.

== Villages ==
As of 2011 census, the mandal has 17 villages. Mylavaram is the most populated village and Mulakalapanta is the least populated village in the mandal.

The settlements in the mandal are listed below:

1. Chandragudem
2. Chandrala
3. Dasullapalem
4. Ganapavaram
5. Jangalapalli
6. Kanimerla
7. Keerthirayanigudem
8. Morusumilli
9. Mulakalapanta
10. Mylavaram
11. Pondugula
12. Pulluru
13. Sabjapadu
14. T.Gannavaram
15. Tholukodu
16. Vedurubeedem
17. Velvadam
18. Badava
19. kothagudem
