= Mylavaram =

- Suburb
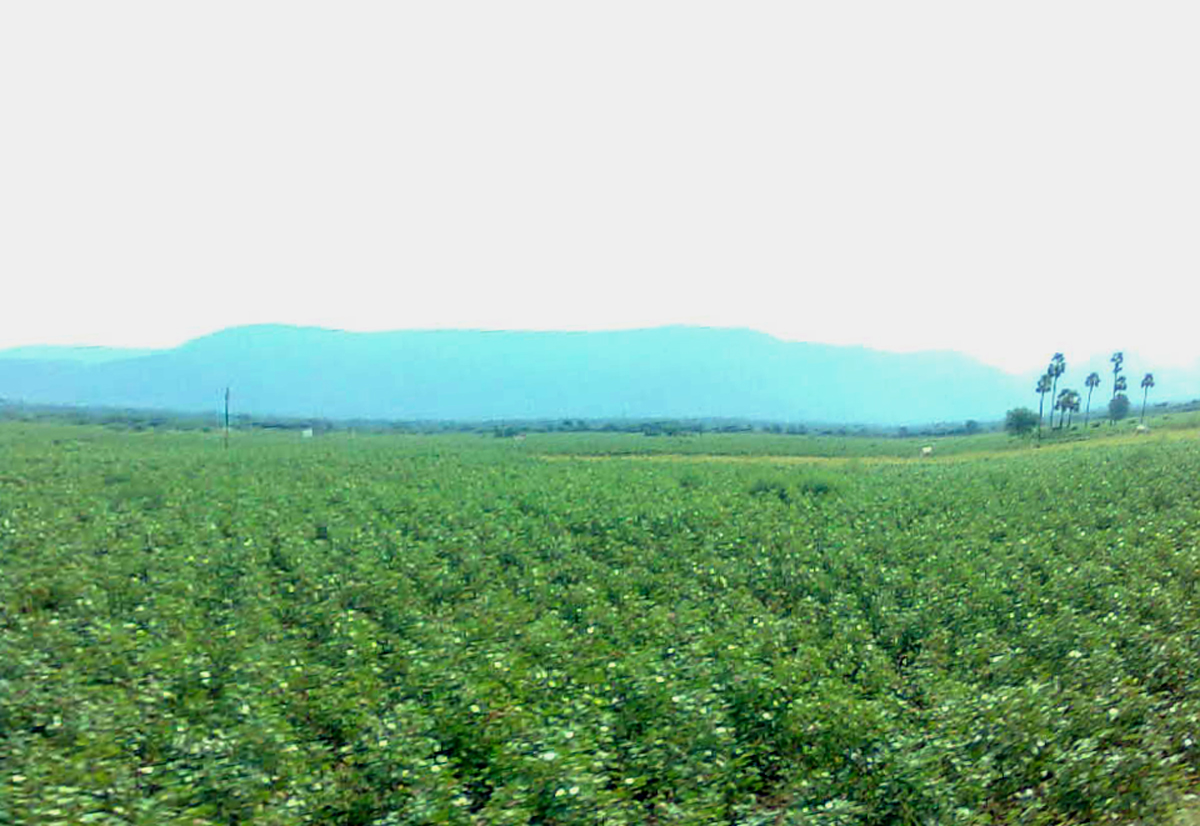
- Fields near Mylavaram
- Interactive map of Mylavaram
- Location in Andhra Pradesh, India Mylavaram (India)
- Coordinates: 16.7833°N 80.6333°E
- Country: India
- State: Andhra Pradesh
- District: NTR

Government
  - Type: Grama panchayat
  - Body: Mylavaram Grama Panchayati; Andhra Pradesh Capital Region
  - Sarpanch: Garikapati Manju Bhargavi
  - MLA: Vasantha Krishna Prasad (TDP)
  - MP: Kesineni Chinni (TDP)

Area
  - Total: 14.57 km^{2} (5.63 sq mi)
- Elevation: 47 m (154 ft)

Population (2011)
  - Total: 21,763
  - Density: 1,494/km^{2} (3,869/sq mi)

Languages
  - Official: Telugu
- Time zone: UTC+5:30 (IST)
- PIN: 521230
- Vehicle registration: AP16
- City: Vijayawada

Mylavaram is a town and suburb of Vijayawada in the NTR district of the Indian state of Andhra Pradesh. It is located in Mylavaram mandal of Vijayawada revenue division. Mylavaram town has higher literacy rate compared to Andhra Pradesh. In 2011, literacy rate of Mylavaram was 69% compared to 67.02% of Andhra Pradesh.

Mylavaram Mandal serves as one of the neighboring mandals to Telangana State, sharing its borders. The town is traversed by the National Highway NH-30, formerly known as NH-221. Within Mylavaram town, notable residential areas include Tarakarama Nagar (Devuni Cheruvu), Bandhagar, Ramakrishna Colony, Balayogi Nagar, Santhi Nagar, NSP Colony, Chandra Babu Nagar, Old town, and Pura Gutta Colony.

== Geography ==
Mylavaram is located at 16.7833°N 80.6333°E. It has an average elevation of 47 metres (157 feet).

== Economy ==
Agriculture produce includes Banginapalli, Totapuri and other varieties of mangoes in the abundant Mango orchards of Mylavaram. These are exported to cities namely Dubai, Hongkong, London and Singapore.

== Assembly constituency ==
Mylavaram falls in Mylavaram (Assembly constituency) is an assembly constituency of Andhra Pradesh Legislative Assembly. Vasantha Krishna Prasad of Telugu Desam Party is the current MLA.

== Education ==
Mylavaram has Lakireddy Bali Reddy College of Engineering (LBRCE). It also has Lakiredyy Hanimi Reddy Government Degree College and Vemuluri Venkata Ratnam Government Junior College.

== See also ==
- Villages in Mylavaram mandal
