= Akividu =

- Town
- Location in Andhra Pradesh, India Akividu (India)
- Coordinates: 16.6000°N 81.3833°E
- Country: India
- State: Andhra Pradesh
- District: West Godavari

Population (2011)
  - Total: 24,506

Languages
  - Official: Telugu
- Time zone: UTC+5:30 (IST)
- PIN: 534235
- Telephone code: 08816
- Vehicle registration: AP–37

Akividu (or Akiveedu) is a town in West Godavari district of Andhra Pradesh, India. It is a nagara panchayati (municipality) and the mandal headquarters of Akiveedu mandal in Bhimavaram revenue division. Akiveedu is a sixth biggest town in former West Godavari district between the cities of Bhimavaram and Eluru.

== Demographics ==
As of the 2011 Census of India, Akividu had a population of 24,506. The total population constitutes 11,963 males and 12,543 females—a sex ratio of 1049 females per 1000 males. 2,500 children are in the age group of 0–6 years, of which 1,222 are boys and 1,278 are girls—a ratio of 1046 per 1000. The average literacy rate stands at 72.94% with 16,051 literates, significantly higher than the state average of 67.41%.

== Transport ==
Akividu railway station is categorized as a Non-Suburban Grade-5 (NSG-5) station in the Vijayawada railway division and is one of the busiest train stations. Its main exports are fish and prawns.
