= Polavaram mandal =

- Mandal
- Interactive Map Outlining mandal
- Location in Andhra Pradesh, India
- Coordinates: 17.2479°N 81.6432°E
- Country: India
- State: Andhra Pradesh
- District: Eluru district
- Headquarters: Polavaram

Government
  - Body: Mandal Parishad
  - Rank: 119.59

Population (2011)
  - Total: 45,392

Languages
  - Official: Telugu
- Time zone: UTC+5:30 (IST)

Polavaram mandal is one of the 27 mandals in Eluru district of the Indian state of Andhra Pradesh. It is under the administration of Jangareddigudem revenue division and the headquarters are located at Polavaram. The mandal lies on the banks of Godavari River which separates it from East Godavari district and is bounded by Gopalapuram and Buttayagudem mandals.

== Demographics ==
As of 2011 census of India, the mandal had a population of 45,392 with 13,677 households. The total population constitute, 22,345 males and 23,047 females —a sex ratio of 983 females per 1031 males. 4,846 children are in the age group of 0–6 years, of which 2,514 are boys and 2,332 are girls. The literacy rate stands at 23.12 with 9,497 literates.

== Government and politics ==
Polavaram mandal is one of the 4 mandals under Polavaram (ST) (Assembly constituency), which in turn represents Eluru (Lok Sabha constituency) of Andhra Pradesh.

== Towns and villages ==
As of 2011 census of India, the mandal has 23 settlements and all are villages.

The settlements in the mandal are listed below:

1. Cheeduru
2. Chegondapalle
3. Chilakaluru
4. Dharvada
5. Geddapalle
6. Gutala
7. Kondrukota
8. Koruturu
9. Lakshminarayana Devipeta
10. Nagampalem
11. Pattisam (Pattisema or PathaPattisema)
12. Polavaram (CT) †
13. Pragada Palle
14. Pydipaka
15. Ravigudem ‡
16. Saripallekunta
17. Singanapalle
18. Sirivaka
19. Sivagiri
20. Tekuru
21. Thutigunta
22. Venkatapuram ‡
23. Vinjaram

Notes
(†) Mandal headquarter
(‡) Uninhabited

== See also ==
- List of mandals in Andhra Pradesh
