= Bolla Bulli Ramaiah =

Indian politician (1926–2018)

Union Minister of Textiles
- In office 20 January 1998 - 19 March 1998
- Prime Minister: I. K. Gujral
- Preceded by: R. L. Jalappa
- Succeeded by: Kashiram Rana

Union Minister of Commerce
- In office 29 June 1996 – 19 March 1998
- Prime Minister: H. D. Deve Gowda; I. K. Gujral
- Preceded by: Devendra Prasad Yadav
- Succeeded by: Ramakrishna Hegde

Member of Parliament, Lok Sabha
- In office 11 October 1999 – 17 May 2004
- Preceded by: Maganti Venkateswara Rao
- Succeeded by: Kavuri Samba Siva Rao
- Constituency: Eluru
- In office 21 June 1991 – 19 March 1998
- Preceded by: Ghattamaneni Krishna
- Succeeded by: Maganti Venkateswara Rao
- Constituency: Eluru
- In office 31 December 1984 – 2 December 1989
- Preceded by: Subbarao Chowdary Chitturi
- Succeeded by: Ghattamaneni Krishna
- Constituency: Eluru

Personal details
- Born: 9 July 1926 Tatipaka, Madras Presidency, British India (now in East Godavari district, Andhra Pradesh), India)
- Died: 14 February 2018 (aged 91) Tanuku, Andhra Pradesh, India
- Party: Telugu Desam Party

Bolla Bulli Ramaiah (9 July 1926 – 14 February 2018) was an Indian politician who was elected to the 8th, 9th, 10th and 12th Lok Sabhas of the Parliament of India from the Eluru constituency in Andhra Pradesh. He was born in Tatipaka, East Godavari district, Andhra Pradesh.

Ramaiah served as a Union Minister and was a member of the Telugu Desam Party.

== Electoral History ==
=== Lok Sabha ===
Year	Constituency	Party	Votes	%	Opponent	Party	Votes	%	Result	Margin	%
1984	Eluru	TDP	351,340	59.21	Vatti Venkata Ranga Partha Sarathi	INC	239,688	40.40	Won	+111,652	+18.82
1989	Eluru	TDP	339,301	44.91	Krishna	INC	410,708	54.36	Lost	−71,407	−9.45
1991	Eluru	TDP	360,312	52.45	Krishna	INC	312,657	45.51	Won	+47,655	+6.94
1996	Eluru	TDP	333,167	42.75	Maganti Venkateswara Rao	INC	331,532	42.54	Won	+1,635	+0.21
1998	Eluru	TDP	361,605	44.74	Maganti Venkateswara Rao	INC	385,412	47.68	Lost	−23,807	−2.95
1999	Eluru	TDP	435,884	52.23	Maganti Venkateswara Rao	INC	373,653	44.78	Won	+62,231	+7.46
2004	Eluru	TDP	375,900	41.91	Kavuru Samba Siva Rao	INC	499,191	55.65	Lost	−123,291	−13.75
