= Putta Sudhakar Yadav =

Indian politician

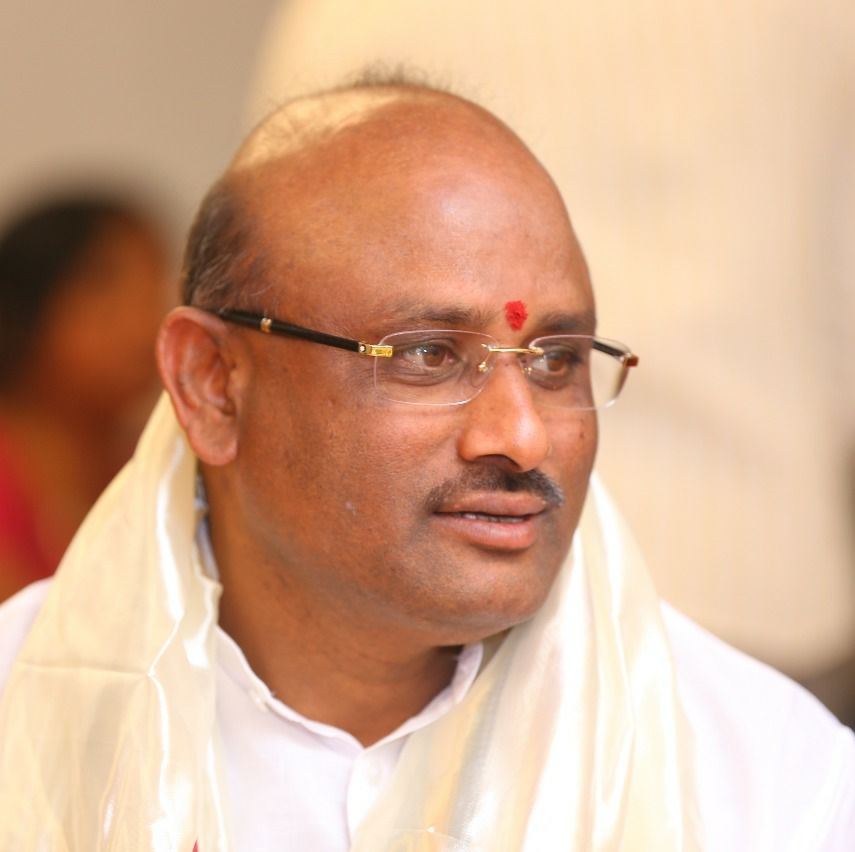

Member of Andhra Pradesh Legislative Assembly
- Incumbent
- Assumed office 4 June 2024
- Preceded by: Settipalli Raghurami Reddy
- Constituency: Mydukur

Personal details
- Party: Telugu Desam Party
- Children: Putta Mahesh Kumar
- Occupation: Politician, Businessman

Putta Sudhakar Yadav is an Indian politician and a businessman. He is a member of Telugu Desam Party and a member of Andhra Pradesh Legislative Assembly from Mydukur Assembly constituency. He was the former chairman of the Board of Trustees of Tirumala Tirupati Devasthanams.

His son Putta Mahesh Kumar is a member of 18th Lok Sabha from Eluru.

== Election statistics ==
	Year	Contested For	Party	Constituency	Opponent	Opponent Party	Votes	Majority	Result
1	2024	MLA	Telugu Desam Party	Mydukur	Settipalli Raghurami Reddy	YSRCP	96,181	20,950	Won
