= Raghavendrapuram =

Coordinates: 10°51′23″N 78°40′18″E

Raghavendrapuram is the name of a place in India. There are at least two villages with the same name, one in Tamil Nadu and the other in Andhra Pradesh. One is in the neighbourhood of the city of Tiruchirappalli in Tamil Nadu, India. The second one is in Polavaram mandal of East Godavari district in Andhra Pradesh. The village has a single teacher Mandal Praja Parishad school.
