= Kommareddi =

Kommareddi or Kommareddy is one of the Indian surnames:

- Kommareddy Savithri, famous Indian actress.
- Kommareddi Suryanarayana, an Indian Parliamentarian.
