= D. L. Ravindra Reddy =

Indian politician

Duggireddy Lakshmireddygari Ravindra Reddy is an Indian politician from the state of Andhra Pradesh belonging to Indian National Congress. He served six terms as a member of the legislative assembly in the undivided Andhra Pradesh.

== Politics ==
He initially won from Mydukur Assembly constituency in the 1978 Andhra Pradesh Legislative Assembly election as an independent member. From 1978 to 2009, he contested eight times to the state legislative assembly and lost only twice in 1985 and 1999.

He served as a cabinet minister in the cabinets of Marri Chenna Reddy, Kotla Vijaya Bhaskara Reddy and Kiran Kumar Reddy. He held the portfolio of Health ministry in the Kiran Kumar Reddy cabinet.

== Election results ==
=== 2009 ===
2009 Andhra Pradesh Legislative Assembly election: Mydukur
Party	Candidate	Votes	%	±%
INC	D L Ravindra Reddy	62,377	43.89	−7.89
TDP	Settipalli Raghurami Reddy	58,016	40.82	−3.44
PRP	Iragamreddy Tirupala Reddy	16,552	11.65	
Majority		4,361	3.07	
Turnout		142,117	79.98	+4.73
INC hold		Swing		
