= Kavuri Samba Siva Rao =

Indian politician, engineer and industrialist (1943–2026)

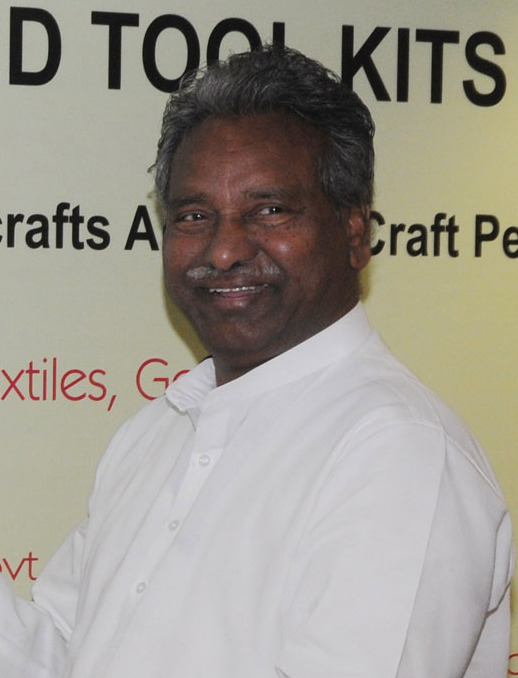
- Rao in 2014

Union Minister of Textiles
- In office 17 June 2013 – 3 April 2014
- Prime Minister: Manmohan Singh
- Preceded by: Anand Sharma
- Succeeded by: Santosh Kumar Gangwar

Member of Parliament, Lok Sabha
- In office 13 May 2004 – 16 May 2014
- Preceded by: Bolla Bulli Ramaiah
- Succeeded by: Maganti Venkateswara Rao
- Constituency: Eluru
- In office 10 March 1998 – 26 April 1999
- Preceded by: Kaikala Satyanarayana
- Succeeded by: Ambati Brahmanaiah
- Constituency: Machilipatnam
- In office 31 December 1984 – 21 June 1991
- Preceded by: Maganti Ankineedu
- Succeeded by: Kolusu Pedda Reddaiah Yadav
- Constituency: Machilipatnam

Personal details
- Born: 1 October 1943 Eluru, Madras Province, British India
- Died: 11 March 2026 (aged 82) Hyderabad, Telangana, India
- Party: Bharatiya Janata Party (2014–2026)
- Other political affiliations: Indian National Congress (1984–2014)
- Spouse: Hemalata
- Children: 1 son and 3 daughters
- Education: NIT Warangal
- As of 16 September, 2006

Kavuri Sambasiva Rao (1 October 1943 – 11 March 2026) was an Indian politician, engineer and industrialist from the state of Andhra Pradesh.

Rao was the Minister of Textiles at Ministry of Textiles, with cabinet rank, for India in UPA Government from 17 June 2013.

He resigned as minister and from the Congress Working Committee by opposing the bifurcation of Andhra Pradesh in 2014.

== Early life and education ==
Rao was born in Dosapadu village, Krishna district, Andhra Pradesh on 1 October 1943. His father was Sri Raghavaiah. He was educated at NIT Warangal.

== Career ==
Rao was a member of the 8th, 9th, 12th, 14th and 15th Lok Sabha of India. He represented the Eluru constituency of Andhra Pradesh and was a member of the Bhartiya Janata Party, which he joined on 1 May 2014.

Once he was permanent invitee for Congress Working Committee. Earlier he represented Machilipatnam Lok Sabha constituency in Andhra Pradesh. Kavuri was a business entrepreneur in the fields of civil construction and health care. He was elected to Indian Parliament five times and member in parliament committee. He swore in as Union Cabinet minister for Textiles on 17 June 2013.

On 28 April 2014, he resigned from the Indian National Congress and announced his decision to join the Bharatiya Janata Party (BJP). A month earlier he had resigned as the minister, protesting the creation of the State of Telangana. He also announced that he would not contest the Lok Sabha polls on Indian National Congress ticket.

== Death ==
Rao died on 11 March 2026, at the age of 82.

== Electoral History ==
=== Lok Sabha ===
Year	Constituency	Party	Votes	%	Opponent	Party	Votes	%	Result	Margin	%
1984	Machilipatnam	INC	272,513	49.84	Vaddi Rangarau	TDP	263,420	48.17	Won	+9,093	+1.67
1989	Machilipatnam	INC	354,533	52.06	Boppana Gangadhara Chaudry	TDP	311,044	45.67	Won	+43,489	+6.39
1991	Machilipatnam	INC	271,026	44.53	K.P. Reddaiah	TDP	298,348	49.02	Lost	−27,322	−4.49
1996	Machilipatnam	AIIC(T)	128,164	18.39	Kaikala Satyanarayana	TDP	275,713	39.57	Lost	−147,549	−21.18
1998	Machilipatnam	INC	355,030	51.28	Kaikala Satyanarayana	TDP	273,938	39.57	Won	+81,092	+11.71
1999	Machilipatnam	INC	304,537	42.78	Ambati Brahmanaiah	TDP	387,533	54.44	Lost	−82,996	−11.66
2004	Eluru	INC	499,191	55.65	Bolla Bulli Ramaiah	TDP	375,900	41.91	Won	+123,291	+13.74
2009	Eluru	INC	423,777	39.28	Maganti Venkateswara Rao	TDP	380,994	35.31	Won	+42,783	+3.97
