= Modiyam Srinivasa Rao =

Indian politician

- మొడియం శ్రీనివాస్
- In office 2014–2019
- Preceded by: Tellam Balaraju
- Succeeded by: Tellam Balaraju
- Constituency: Polavaram

Personal details
- Born: 26 May 1973 (age 52) Rajanagaram, West Godavari Dist, Andhra Pradesh, India
- Party: Telugu Desam Party
- Spouse: Gunavathi
- Children: 2
- Parent(s): Modiyam Ganga Raju (1941-2017), Naga Ratnam
- Occupation: Politician

Modiyam Srinivas is an Indian politician. He served as a member of the Andhra Pradesh Legislative Assembly, representing the Polavaram Assembly Constituency in 2014. He is a member of Telugu Desam Party.
