= Denduluru Assembly constituency =

Constituency of the Andhra Pradesh Legislative Assembly, India

Coordinates: 16.76°N 81.17°E

Denduluru
- Constituency No. 64 for the Andhra Pradesh Legislative Assembly
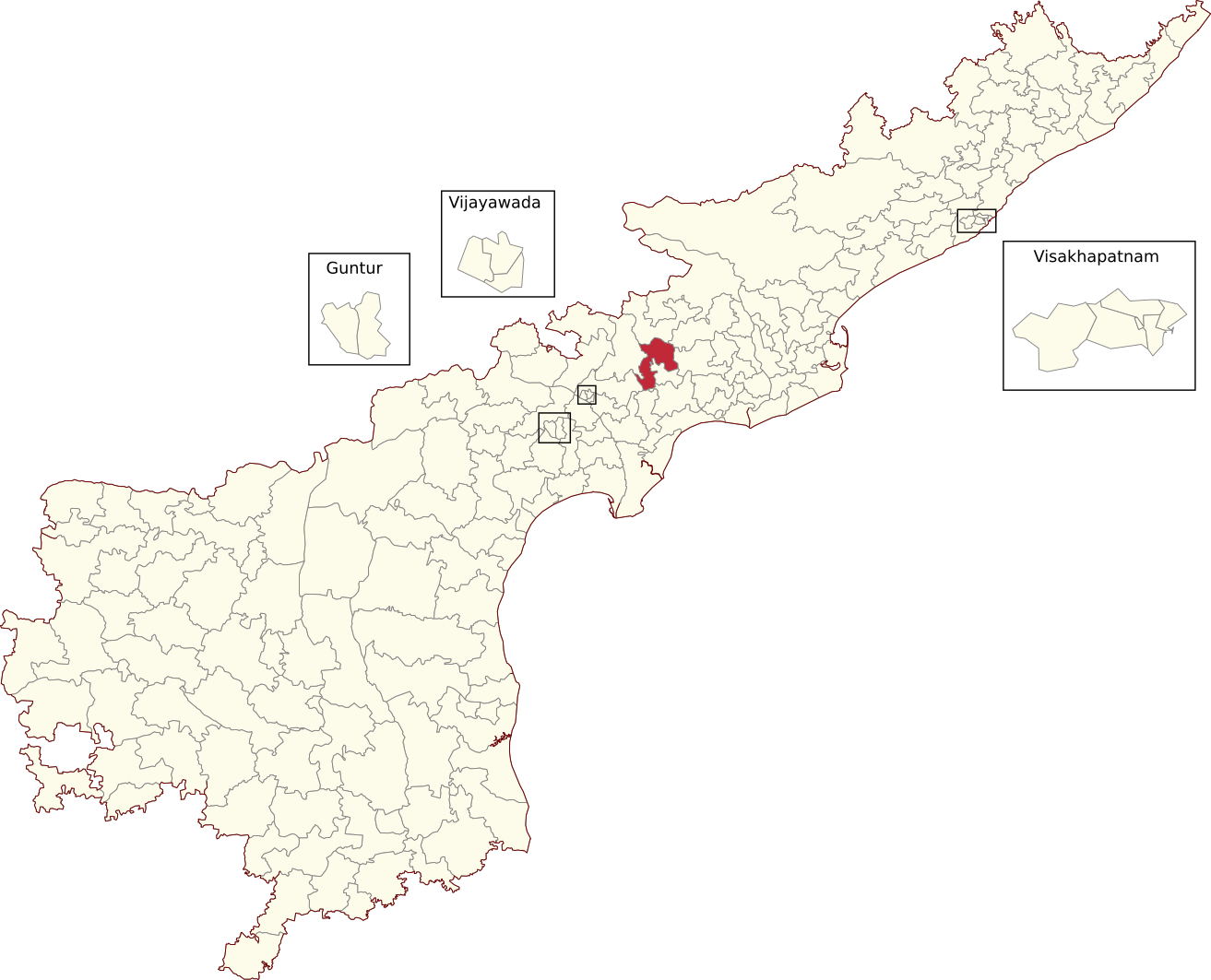
- Location of Denduluru Assembly constituency within Andhra Pradesh

Constituency details
- Country: India
- Region: South India
- State: Andhra Pradesh
- District: Eluru
- Lok Sabha constituency: Eluru
- Established: 1955
- Total electors: 220,274
- Reservation: None

Member of Legislative Assembly
- 16th Andhra Pradesh Legislative Assembly
- Incumbent Chintamaneni Prabhakar
- Party: TDP
- Alliance: NDA
- Elected year: 2024

Denduluru Assembly constituency is a constituency in Eluru district of Andhra Pradesh that elects representatives to the Andhra Pradesh Legislative Assembly in India. It is one of the seven assembly segments of Eluru Lok Sabha constituency.

Chintamaneni Prabhakar is the current MLA of the constituency, having won the 2024 Andhra Pradesh Legislative Assembly election from Telugu Desam Party. As of 2019, there are a total of 220,274 electors in the constituency. The constituency was established in 1955, as per the Delimitation Orders (1955).

== Mandals ==
The mandals that form the assembly constituency are:

Mandal
Denduluru
Pedavegi
Pedapadu
Eluru (part)

== Members of the Legislative Assembly ==
Year	Member	Party
1955	Dr Mulpuri Rangayya	Indian National Congress
1962	Motaparthi Ramamohana Rao	Independent
1967	Motaparthi Ramamohana Rao	Indian National Congress
1972	Motaparthi Ramamohana Rao	Indian National Congress
1978	Neelam Charles	Indian National Congress (I)
1983	Garapati Sambasiva Rao	Telugu Desam Party
1985	Garapati Sambasiva Rao	Telugu Desam Party
1989	Maganti Ravindranadha Chowdary	Indian National Congress
1991 by-election	Maganti Vara Lakshmi	Indian National Congress
1994	Garapati Sambasiva Rao	Telugu Desam Party
1999	Garapati Sambasiva Rao	Telugu Desam Party
2004	Maganti Venkateswara Rao	Indian National Congress
2009	Chintamaneni Prabhakar	Telugu Desam Party
2014	Chintamaneni Prabhakar	Telugu Desam Party
2019	Kotaru Abbaya Chowdary	YSR Congress Party
2024	Chintamaneni Prabhakar	Telugu Desam Party

== Election results ==
=== 2004 ===
2004 Andhra Pradesh Legislative Assembly election: Denduluru
Party	Candidate	Votes	%	±%
INC	Maganti Venkateswara Rao	67,833	54.39	+9.17
TDP	Garapati Sambasiva Rao	54,522	43.71	−9.23
Majority		13,311	10.68	
Turnout		124,727	81.86	+6.98
INC gain from TDP		Swing	no	

=== 2009 ===
2009 Andhra Pradesh Legislative Assembly election: Denduluru
Party	Candidate	Votes	%	±%
TDP	Chintamaneni Prabhakar	69,673	45.27	+1.56
INC	Kotharu Ramachandra Rao	55,442	36.02	−18.37
PRP	Ashok Goud Chalamolu	24,269	15.78	
Majority		14,235	9.25	
Turnout		153,922	86.04	+4.18
TDP gain from INC		Swing		

=== 2014 ===
2014 Andhra Pradesh Legislative Assembly election: Denduluru
Party	Candidate	Votes	%	±%
TDP	Chintamaneni Prabhakar	92,204	53.68	
YSRCP	Karumuri Venkata Nageswara Rao	74463	43.35	
Majority		17,746	10.33	
Turnout		171,791	86.82	+0.78
TDP hold		Swing		

=== 2019 ===
2019 Andhra Pradesh Legislative Assembly election: Denduluru
Party	Candidate	Votes	%	±%
YSRCP	Kotaru Abbaya Chowdary	95,000	51.42	
TDP	Chintamaneni Prabhakar	78,683	42.08	
Majority		16,131	9.00	
Turnout		1,86,989		
YSRCP gain from TDP		Swing		

=== 2024 ===
2024 Andhra Pradesh Legislative Assembly election: Denduluru
Party	Candidate	Votes	%	±%
TDP	Chintamaneni Prabhakar	107,287	55.11	
YSRCP	Kotaru Abbaya Chowdary	81,021	41.62	
INC	Alapati Narasimha Murthy	1607	0.83	
NOTA	None Of The Above	1920	0.99	
Majority		26,266	13.49	
Turnout		1,94,666		
TDP gain from YSRCP		Swing		

== See also ==
- List of constituencies of Andhra Pradesh Legislative Assembly
