= Ministry of Textiles =

Government ministry of India

- Branch of Government of India

- Ministry of Textiles

Ministry overview
- Jurisdiction: Government of India
- Headquarters: Udyog Bhawan, New Delhi
- Annual budget: ₹10,000 crore (US$1.0 billion) (2026–27 est.)
- Ministers responsible: Giriraj Singh, Cabinet Minister; Pabitra Margherita, Minister of State
- Website: www.texmin.gov.in

The Ministry of Textiles is an Indian government national agency responsible for the formulation of policy, planning, development, export promotion and regulation of the textile industry in India. This includes all natural, artificial, and cellulosic fibers that go into the making of textiles, clothing and Handicrafts.

== Main functions of the ministry ==
- Textile Policy & Coordination
- Man-made Fibre/ Filament Yarn Industry
- Cotton Textile Industry
- Jute Industry
- Silk and Silk Textile Industry
- Wool & Woollen Industry
- Decentralised Powerloom Sector
- Export Promotion
- Planning & Economic Analysis

== Organizations ==
=== Attached offices ===
- Office of the Development Commissioner for Hand-looms
  - Weavers Service Centre, New Delhi
- Office of the Development Commissioner for Handicrafts

=== Subordinate offices ===
- Office of the Textile Commissioner
- Office of the Jute Commissioner

=== Central Public Sector Undertakings (CPSUs) ===
- Basic Tasar Silkworm Seed Organisation (BTSSO), Bilaspur
- Birds Jute and Exports Limited
- Central Cottage Industries Corporation of India Limited
- Central Sericultural Germplasm Resources Centre (CSGRC), Hosur
- Cotton Corporation of India Limited (CCI)
- Handicrafts and Handlooms Export Corporation Limited
- Jute Corporation of India Limited (JCI)
- National Handloom Development Corporation Limited (NHDC)
- National Textile Corporation Limited (NTC)
- Silk Mark Organisation of India, Bangalore

=== Statutory bodies ===
- National Jute Board
- Jute Manufacturers Development Council
- Central Silk Board
- Textile Committee
- Commissioner of Payments
- National Institute of Fashion Technology (NIFT)
  - NIFT Foundation for Design Innovation

=== Advisory bodies ===
- Development Council for Textile Industry
- Co-ordination Council for Textile Research Associations
- Co-ordination Committee of Textiles Export Promotion Council
- Carpet Export Promotion Council
- Apparel Export Promotion Council
- Cotton Textiles Export Promotion Council
- Synthetic and Rayon Textiles Export Promotion Council (SRTEPC)
- Wool and Woollens Export Promotion Council (WWEPC)

=== Autonomous bodies ===
- Central Wool Development Board, Jodhpur
- National Institute of Fashion Technology (NIFT)
- Sardar Vallabhbhai Patel International School of Textiles & Management, Coimbatore
- Indian Institutes of Handloom Technology (IIHT)
- Handloom Export Promotion Council
- National Handicrafts and Handlooms Museum-Crafts Museum
- Central Muga Eri Research and Training Institute (CMER and TI), Lahdoigarh

== Schemes and Programmes ==
- Bhartiya Vastra evam Shilpa Kosh
- Handloom Development Schemes, Development Commissioner for Handlooms
- IndiaHandmade
- Indian Handicrafts Portal
- Jute Mark India Scheme
- National Technical Textile Mission
- Production Linked Incentive
- Scheme for Capacity Building In Textile Sector (Samarth)
- Sericulture Information Linkages and Knowledge System (SILKS)
- Technotex 2023

== Cabinet ministers ==
Portrait	Minister (Birth-Death) Constituency	Term of office			Political party	Ministry	Prime Minister
Portrait	Minister (Birth-Death) Constituency	From	To	Period	Political party	Ministry	Prime Minister
	Chandrashekhar Singh (1927–1986); MP for Banka (Minister of State, I/C)	30 March 1985	25 September 1985	179 days	Indian National Congress	Rajiv II	Rajiv Gandhi
	Khurshed Alam Khan (1919–2013); MP for Farrukhabad (Minister of State, I/C)	15 November 1985	22 October 1986	341 days	Indian National Congress	Rajiv II	Rajiv Gandhi
	Ram Niwas Mirdha (1924–2010); MP for Barmer (Minister of State, I/C until 15 Feb 1988)	22 October 1986	2 December 1989	3 years, 41 days	Indian National Congress	Rajiv II	Rajiv Gandhi
	Sharad Yadav (1947–2023); MP for Badaun	6 December 1989	10 November 1990	339 days	Janata Dal	Vishwanath	Vishwanath Pratap Singh
	Hukmdev Narayan Yadav (born 1939); MP for Sitamarhi	21 November 1990	21 June 1991	212 days	Samajwadi Janata Party (Rashtriya)	Chandra Shekhar	Chandra Shekhar
	Ashok Gehlot (born 1951); MP for Jodhpur (Minister of State, I/C)	21 June 1991	18 January 1993	1 year, 211 days	Indian National Congress	Rao	P. V. Narasimha Rao
	Gaddam Venkatswamy (1929–2014); MP for Peddapalli (Minister of State, I/C until 10 Feb 1995)	18 January 1993	15 September 1995	2 years, 240 days	Indian National Congress	Rao	P. V. Narasimha Rao
	Kamal Nath (born 1946); MP for Chhindwara (Minister of State, I/C)	15 September 1995	20 February 1996	158 days	Indian National Congress	Rao	P. V. Narasimha Rao
	Gaddam Venkatswamy (1929–2014); MP for Peddapalli	20 February 1996	16 May 1996	86 days	Indian National Congress	Rao	P. V. Narasimha Rao
	Atal Bihari Vajpayee (1924–2018); MP for Lucknow (Prime Minister)	16 May 1996	1 June 1996	16 days	Bharatiya Janata Party	Vajpayee I	Atal Bihari Vajpayee
	H. D. Deve Gowda (born 1933); Unelected (Prime Minister)	1 June 1996	29 June 1996	28 days	Janata Dal	Deve Gowda	H. D. Deve Gowda
	R. L. Jalappa (1925–2021); MP for Chikballapur (Minister of State, I/C until 6 Jul 1996)	29 June 1996	21 April 1997	1 year, 205 days	Janata Dal	Deve Gowda	H. D. Deve Gowda
	R. L. Jalappa (1925–2021); MP for Chikballapur (Minister of State, I/C until 6 Jul 1996)	21 April 1997	20 January 1998	1 year, 205 days	Janata Dal	Gujral	I. K. Gujral
	Bolla Bulli Ramaiah (1926–2018); MP for Eluru (Minister of State, I/C)	20 January 1998	19 March 1998	58 days	Telugu Desam Party	Gujral	I. K. Gujral
	Kashiram Rana (1938–2012); MP for Surat	19 March 1998	13 October 1999	5 years, 66 days	Bharatiya Janata Party	Vajpayee II	Atal Bihari Vajpayee
	Kashiram Rana (1938–2012); MP for Surat	13 October 1999	24 May 2003	5 years, 66 days	Bharatiya Janata Party	Vajpayee III	Atal Bihari Vajpayee
	Syed Shahnawaz Hussain (born 1968); MP for Kishanganj	24 May 2003	22 May 2004	364 days	Bharatiya Janata Party	Vajpayee III	Atal Bihari Vajpayee
	Shankersinh Vaghela (born 1940); MP for Kapadvanj	23 May 2004	22 May 2009	4 years, 364 days	Indian National Congress	Manmohan I	Manmohan Singh
	Dayanidhi Maran (born 1966); MP for Chennai Central	28 May 2009	12 July 2011	2 years, 45 days	Dravida Munnetra Kazhagam	Manmohan II	Manmohan Singh
	Anand Sharma (born 1953); Rajya Sabha MP for Rajasthan	12 July 2011	17 June 2013	1 year, 340 days	Indian National Congress	Manmohan II	Manmohan Singh
	Kavuri Samba Siva Rao (1943–2026); MP for Eluru	17 June 2013	3 April 2014	290 days	Indian National Congress	Manmohan II	Manmohan Singh
	Anand Sharma (born 1953); Rajya Sabha MP for Rajasthan	3 April 2014	26 May 2014	53 days	Indian National Congress	Manmohan II	Manmohan Singh
	Santosh Kumar Gangwar (born 1948); MP for Bareilly (Minister of State, I/C)	27 May 2014	5 July 2016	2 years, 40 days	Bharatiya Janata Party	Modi I	Narendra Modi
	Smriti Irani (born 1976); Rajya Sabha MP for Gujarat, until 2019; MP for Amethi, from 2019	5 July 2016	30 May 2019	5 years, 2 days	Bharatiya Janata Party	Modi I	Narendra Modi
	Smriti Irani (born 1976); Rajya Sabha MP for Gujarat, until 2019; MP for Amethi, from 2019	31 May 2019	7 July 2021	5 years, 2 days	Bharatiya Janata Party	Modi II	Narendra Modi
	Piyush Goyal (born 1964); Rajya Sabha MP for Maharashtra	7 July 2021	9 June 2024	2 years, 338 days	Bharatiya Janata Party	Modi II	Narendra Modi
	Giriraj Singh (born 1957); MP for Begusarai	10 June 2024	Incumbent	2 years, 60 days	Bharatiya Janata Party	Modi III	Narendra Modi

== Ministers of state ==
Portrait	Minister (Birth-Death) Constituency	Term of office			Political party	Ministry	Prime Minister
Portrait	Minister (Birth-Death) Constituency	From	To	Period	Political party	Ministry	Prime Minister
	Rafique Alam (1929–2011); Rajya Sabha MP for Bihar	25 June 1988	4 July 1989	1 year, 9 days	Indian National Congress	Rajiv II	Rajiv Gandhi
	Saroj Khaparde; Rajya Sabha MP for Maharashtra	4 July 1989	2 December 1989	151 days	Indian National Congress	Rajiv II	Rajiv Gandhi
	Gingee N. Ramachandran (born 1944); MP for Tindivanam	13 October 1999	30 September 2000	353 days	Marumalarchi Dravida Munnetra Kazhagam	Vajpayee III	Atal Bihari Vajpayee
	V. Dhananjay Kumar (1951–2019); MP for Mangalore	30 September 2000	1 July 2002	1 year, 274 days	Bharatiya Janata Party	Vajpayee III	Atal Bihari Vajpayee
	Basangouda Patil Yatnal (born 1963); MP for Bijapur	1 July 2002	8 September 2003	1 year, 69 days	Bharatiya Janata Party	Vajpayee III	Atal Bihari Vajpayee
	Gingee N. Ramachandran (born 1944); MP for Tindivanam	8 September 2003	30 December 2003	113 days	Marumalarchi Dravida Munnetra Kazhagam	Vajpayee III	Atal Bihari Vajpayee
	E. V. K. S. Elangovan (born 1948); MP for Gobichettipalayam	29 January 2006	22 May 2009	3 years, 113 days	Indian National Congress	Manmohan I	Manmohan Singh
	Panabaka Lakshmi (born 1958); MP for Bapatla	28 May 2009	31 October 2012	3 years, 156 days	Indian National Congress	Manmohan II	Manmohan Singh
	Panabaka Lakshmi (born 1958); MP for Bapatla	5 March 2013	26 May 2014	1 year, 82 days	Indian National Congress	Manmohan II	Manmohan Singh
	Ajay Tamta (born 1972); MP for Almora	5 July 2016	30 May 2019	2 years, 329 days	Bharatiya Janata Party	Modi I	Narendra Modi
	Darshana Jardosh (born 1961); MP for Surat	7 July 2021	9 June 2024	2 years, 338 days	Bharatiya Janata Party	Modi II	Narendra Modi
	Pabitra Margherita (born 1974); Rajya Sabha MP for Assam	10 June 2024	Incumbent	2 years, 60 days	Bharatiya Janata Party	Modi III	Narendra Modi

== National Handlooms & Handicrafts Museum ==
National Handicrafts and Handlooms Museum, New Delhi was set up at Pragati Maidan, New Delhi under the administrative control of the Ministry of Textiles. The Museum is a structured village complex consisting of 15 structures representing village dwellings, courtyards and shrines from different states spread over an area of 5 hectares. The museum collection contains about 20,000 most rare and distinctive pieces reflecting the continuing tradition of Indian craftsmen.
