= Putta Mahesh Kumar =

Indian politician

Putta Mahesh Kumar Yadav
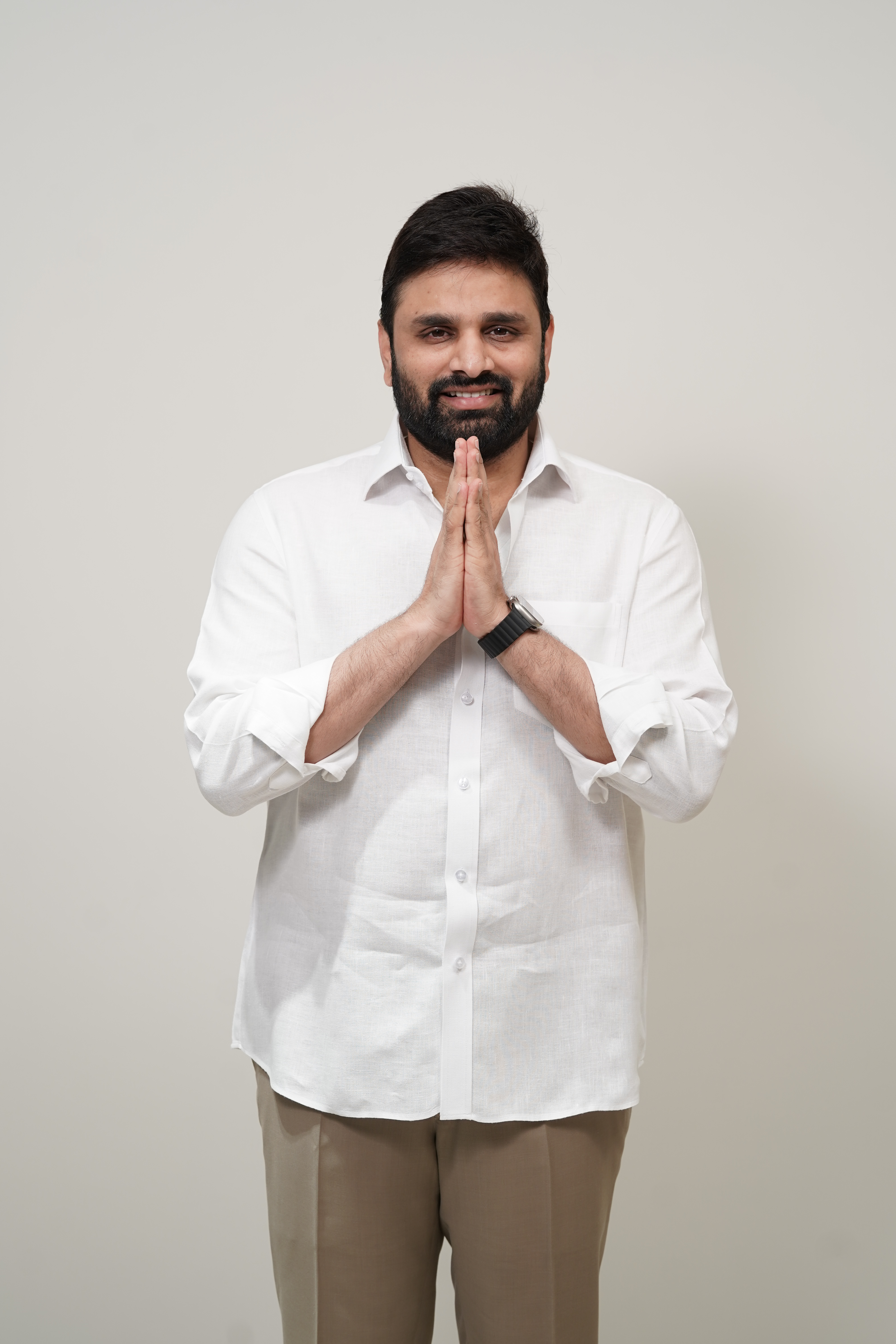

Member of Parliament, Lok Sabha
- Incumbent
- Assumed office 4 June 2024
- Preceded by: Kotagiri Sridhar
- Constituency: Eluru

Personal details
- Born: 10 April 1988 (age 38) Proddutur, Kadapa, Andhra Pradesh, India
- Party: Telugu Desam Party (2014 - Present)
- Children: [Hridhan (Son)]
- Parents: Putta Sudhakar Yadav (father); Putta Vijayalakshmi (mother)
- Education: Jawaharlal Nehru Technological University, Hyderabad (Civil Engineering)
- Occupation: Politician and Business Man

Putta Mahesh Kumar (born on 10 April 1988), is an Indian politician and the elected candidate for Lok Sabha from Eluru Lok Sabha constituency(10). He is a member of the Telugu Desam Party. One of the youngest politician in Andhra Pradesh.

== Early life and education ==
Putta Mahesh Kumar was born to Smt. Putta Vijayalakshmi and Putta Sudhakar Yadav in Proddutur, Kadapa district. His father is a member of Telugu Desam Party and a member of Andhra Pradesh Legislative Assembly from Mydukur Assembly constituency. He was the former chairman of the board of trustees of Tirumala Tirupati Devasthanams.

He pursued his Bachelor of Technology in civil engineering from Jawaharlal Nehru Technological University, Hyderabad.

== Election statistics ==
	Year	Contested For	Party	Constituency	Opponent Party	Votes	Majority	
1	2024	MP	Telugu Desam Party	Eluru	YSRCP	7,46,351	1,81,857	Won

== Developments ==
Vande Bharat Halt in Eluru

Takes Up Farmers Issues on Key Infrastructure Projects With PM Modi

Mp Intensifies Efforts to Develop Eluru - Jangareddygudem NH Road

Donation of Rs. 25 Lakhs to CMRF

Construction of ROB's Received Administrative Approval.

== Drugs Case ==
In March 2026, Putta Mahesh Kumar Yadav, TDP MP from Eluru, was implicated in a suspected drug-consumption case following a police raid at a farmhouse in Moinabad, Telangana. Police reportedly stated that his blood tests detected amphetamine and methamphetamine, allegations he denied; he subsequently submitted separate negative drug-test reports. He was arrested in connection with the case and later granted bail, while the controversy prompted disciplinary scrutiny from the TDP leadership.

== See also ==
- 18th Lok Sabha
