= Kotagiri Sridhar =

Indian politician

Member of Parliament, Lok Sabha
- In office 2019–2024
- Preceded by: Maganti Venkateswara Rao
- Succeeded by: Putta Mahesh Kumar
- Constituency: Eluru, Andhra Pradesh

Personal details
- Born: 22 October 1973 (age 52)
- Party: YSR Congress Party
- Spouse: Saritha Katikaneni
- Parent: Kotagiri Vidyadhara Rao (father)

Kotagiri Sridhar is an Indian politician. He was elected to the Lok Sabha, the lower house of the Parliament of India from Eluru, Andhra Pradesh in the 2019 Indian general election as a member of the YSR Congress Party.

== See also ==
- Andhra Pradesh Football Association
