= Kotaru Abbaya Chowdary =

Indian politician (born 1983)

Member of Legislative Assembly, Andhra Pradesh
- In office 2019–2024
- Preceded by: Chintamaneni Prabhakar
- Succeeded by: Chintamaneni Prabhakar
- Constituency: Denduluru

Personal details
- Political party: YSR Congress Party

Kotaru Abbaya Chowdary (born 1983) is an Indian politician from Andhra Pradesh. He is a former MLA of YSR Congress Party from Denduluru Assembly constituency in West Godavari District. He won the 2019 Andhra Pradesh Legislative Assembly Election. Despite opposition from some sections in the YSR Congress Party, he was nominated again to contest from Denduluru Assembly Constituency in Eluru District in the 2024 Andhra Pradesh Legislative Assembly Election, which he lost.

== Early life and education ==
Chowdary was born in Kondalaraopalem, Pedavegi mandal, Eluru division of erstwhile West Godavari district. He belongs to Kamma community. His father Abbayya Chaudhary was also a politician. He left his software job in London and took the path of his father, Ramachandra, into politics. He married Anuradha, a manager of Loyalty Bank, London. He did his B.Tech. from R. M. K. Engineering College, Chennai.

== Career ==
Chowdary made his electoral debut and won the 2019 Andhra Pradesh Legislative Assembly Election defeating Chintamaneni Prabhakar of Telugu Desam Party by a margin of 17,459 votes. He faced Chintamaneni Prabhakar as his opponent again in the 2024 Andhra Pradesh Legislative Assembly Election, and lost to him by 26,266 votes.
