= Mothey Vedakumari =

Member of Parliament
- In office 1957–1962
- Succeeded by: V. Vimala Devi
- Constituency: Eluru

Personal details
- Born: 24 September 1931 Eluru, Andhra Pradesh, India
- Died: 1977 (aged 45–46)
- Party: Indian National Congress

Mothey Vedakumari (24 September 1931 – 1977) was an Indian parliamentarian and singer.

== Life and career ==
Mothey Vedakumari was born at Eluru, Andhra Pradesh on 24 September 1931. Her father was Mothey Narayana Rao.

Vedakumari was secretary of the Students' Congress, Eluru. She was secretary, West Godavari Branch of All India Women's Conference. She has started an institution for giving free coaching to women in Hindi, tailoring, typewriting etc.

Vedakumari was recognized by All India Radio as first-class artiste and broadcasts Carnatic music regularly.

Vedakumari was elected to 2nd Lok Sabha from Eluru constituency in 1957 as a member of Indian National Congress.

Vedakumari died from cancer in 1977.
