= Pothunuru, Denduluru mandal =

Pothunuru
- Village
- Interactive map of Pothunuru
- Location in Andhra Pradesh, India
- Country: India
- State: Andhra Pradesh
- District: Eluru

Population (2011)
  - Total: 10,746

Languages
  - Official: Telugu
- Time zone: UTC+5:30 (IST)
- PIN: 534442
- Telephone code: 08829

Pothunuru is a village in Denduluru mandal of Eluru district, Andhra Pradesh, India.

== Demographics ==
As of 2011 Census of India, Pothunuru had a population of 7177. The total population constitute, 3619 males and 3558 females with a sex ratio of 993 females per 1000 males. 684 children are in the age group of 0–6 years, with sex ratio of 1024. The average literacy rate stands at 74.51%.

== Eminent persons ==
- Kommareddi Suryanarayana - a parliamentarian was born here.

Parvathaneni Upendra, a parliamentarian and Ex Central minister was born here.

Maganti Varalaksmi Devi, Ex Member of Legislature Assembly was born here.
