= Development Commissioner for Handicrafts =

Indian federal government agency

Office of Development Commissioner for Handicrafts
- Abbreviation: DCH
- Type: Government Agency
- Legal status: Active
- Purpose: Development and promotion of handicrafts sector
- Headquarters: New Delhi, India
- Development Commissioner: Ms. Amrit Raj
- Parent organization: Ministry of Textiles, Government of India
- Website: handicrafts.nic.in

The office of Development Commissioner for Handicrafts is the national agency which works for the development, promotion and export of Indian handicrafts. The agency comes under the administrative control of Ministry of Textiles, Government of India.

== Schemes ==
- Ambedkar Hastshilp Vikas Yojana
- DESIGN & SKILL DEVELOPMENT IN HANDICRAFT SECTOR
- Mega Cluster Scheme
- Marketing Support and Services Scheme
- Research and Development Scheme

== Demographic profile of artisans in India ==
Female	Male
56.13%	43.87%
