= Sardar Vallabhbhai Patel International School of Textiles & Management =

- Motto: Textile Management Excellence
- Type: Public
- Established: 2002; 24 years ago
- Affiliations: Central University of Tamil Nadu
- Chairman: Upendra Prasad Singh
- Director: P. Alli Rani
- Academic staff: 20
- Students: 291
- Undergraduates: 179
- Postgraduates: 92
- Doctoral students: 20
- Location: Coimbatore, Tamil Nadu, India; 11.0252917°N 77.0074718°E
- Website: svpistm.ac.in

Sardar Vallabhbhai Patel International School of Textiles and Management (SVPITM) is an autonomous institution under the Indian Ministry of Textiles. It was established on 24 December 2002, in Coimbatore, Tamil Nadu and is approved by AICTE. Its courses focus on textiles and textile management education.

== School Director ==
There is no permanent director for this institute.

The current director is C. Rameshkumar, who has published 50 plus papers in Indian and international journals. He has conducted research work on the cut resistance behaviour of DREF yarn fabrics. He previously served at Parisutham Institute of Technology and Science, Thanjavur as Director of Academics.

When Rameshkumar's term as a director is over, he will be succeeded by MK Gandhi who is currently acting director. Gandhi previously worked in NIFT in Chennai.

== Achievements ==
SVPITM has been identified as the nodal centre for conducting workshops on technical textiles by the Government of Tamil Nadu.

== Ranking ==
Rated as good in the survey by Business India
Rated by A4 by Indian Management

== Courses Offered ==
Sources:

- BSc in Textiles and Technical Textiles
- BSc in Textile and Apparel Design
- BBA in Textile Business Analytics
- MBA in Textile Management
- MBA in Apparel Management
- MBA in Retail Management
- MBA in Technical Textile Management

== Demand for merging with CUTN ==
In February 2020, nearly 100 students petitioned against then district collector K. Rajamani during the grievances redress day meeting. They demanded the merger of the institute with the Central University of Tamil Nadu (CUTN). The students alleged that the Ministry of Textiles had not issued any order to CUTN despite approval from a Cabinet Committee. The aggrieved students boycotted classes for two weeks in protest.
