= Viramachaneni Vimla Devi =

Indian parliamentarian

Veeramachaneni Vimala Devi

Member of Parliament
- In office 1962–1967
- Preceded by: Mothey Vedakumari
- Succeeded by: Kommareddi Suryanarayana
- Constituency: Eluru

Personal details
- Born: 15 July 1928 Varahapatnam, Andhra Pradesh, India
- Died: 1967 (aged 38–39)
- Party: Communist Party of India

Dr. Veeramachaneni Vimala Devi (15 July 1928 – 1967) was an Indian parliamentarian. She was elected to the 3rd Lok Sabha from Eluru constituency as a member of Communist Party of India in 1962.
