= Polavaram Assembly constituency =

Constituency of the Andhra Pradesh Legislative Assembly, India

Coordinates: 17.25°N 81.64°E

Polavaram
- Constituency No. 67 for the Andhra Pradesh Legislative Assembly
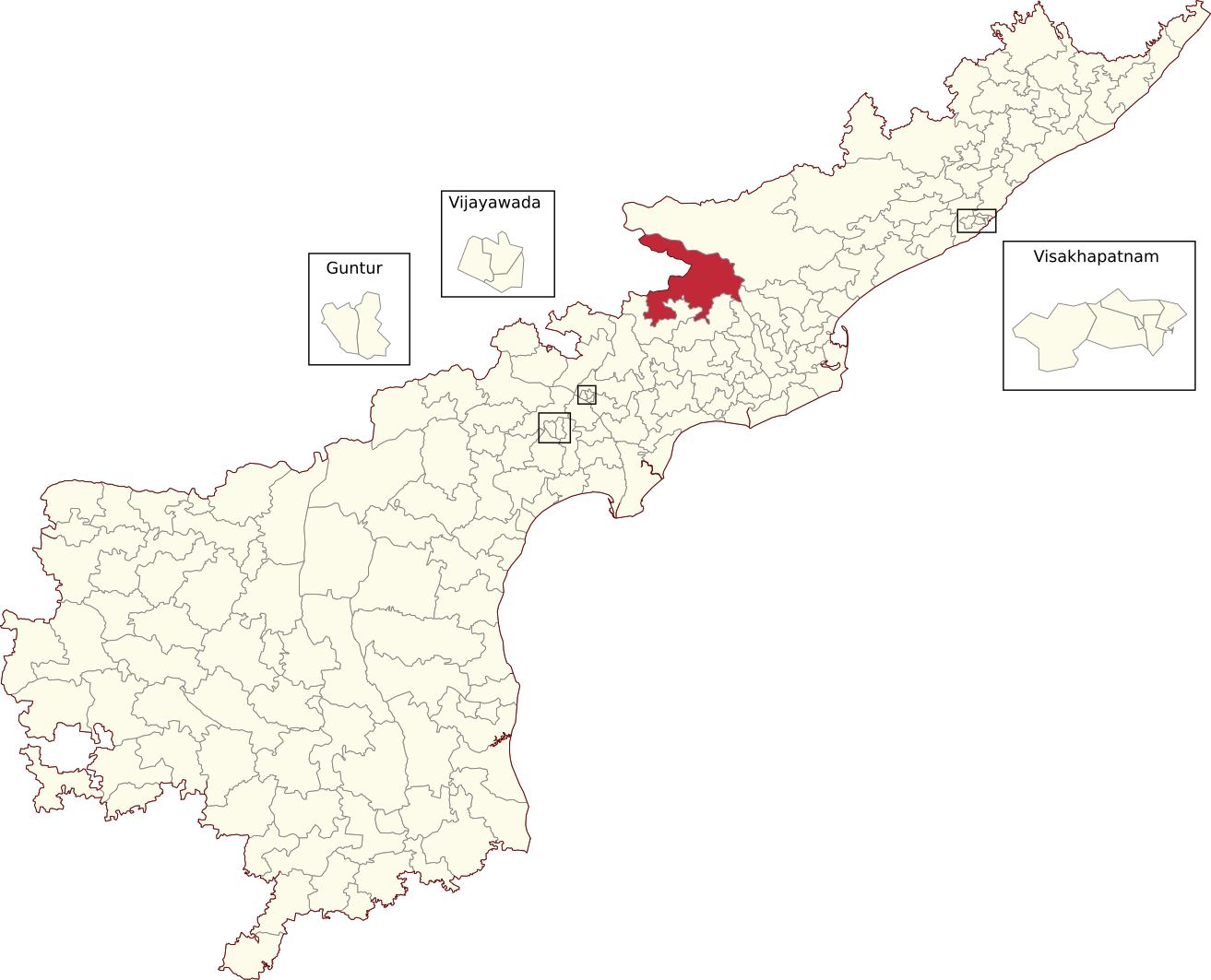
- Location of Polavaram Assembly constituency within Andhra Pradesh

Constituency details
- Country: India
- Region: South India
- State: Andhra Pradesh
- District: Eluru
- Lok Sabha constituency: Eluru
- Established: 1955
- Total electors: 245,483
- Reservation: ST

Member of Legislative Assembly
- 16th Andhra Pradesh Legislative Assembly
- Incumbent Chirri Balaraju
- Party: JSP
- Alliance: NDA
- Elected year: 2024

Polavaram Assembly constituency is a Scheduled Tribe reserved constituency in Eluru district of Andhra Pradesh that elects representatives to the Andhra Pradesh Legislative Assembly in India. It is one of the seven assembly segments of Eluru Lok Sabha constituency.

Chirri Balaraju is the current MLA of the constituency, having won the 2024 Andhra Pradesh Legislative Assembly election from Jana Sena Party. The constituency was established in 1955, as per the Delimitation Orders (1955).

== Mandals ==
The 7 mandals that form the assembly constituency are:

Mandal
Polavaram
Buttayagudem
Jeelugumilli
Koyyalagudem
T.Narasapuram
Kukkunoor
Velerupadu

== Members of the Legislative Assembly ==
Year	Member	Political party
1955	Pusuluri Kodanad Ramayya	Indian National Congress
1962	Karatam Baburao	Communist Party of India
1967	K. R. Reddi	Indian National Congress
1972	Kanithi Ramulu	Indian National Congress
1978	Nagabhushanam Rasaputra	Indian National Congress (I)
1983	Modiyam Lakshmana Rao	Telugu Desam Party
1985	Modiyam Lakshmana Rao	Telugu Desam Party
1987	Badisa Durga Rao	Indian National Congress
1989	Badisa Durga Rao	Indian National Congress
1994	Punem Singanna Dora	Telugu Desam Party
1999	Vanka Srinivasa Rao	Telugu Desam Party
2004	Tellam Balaraju	Indian National Congress
2009	Tellam Balaraju	Indian National Congress
2012	Tellam Balaraju	YSR Congress Party
2014	Modiyam Srinivasa Rao	Telugu Desam Party
2019	Tellam Balaraju	YSR Congress Party
2024	Chirri Balaraju	Jana Sena Party

== Election results ==
=== 2024 ===
2024 Andhra Pradesh Legislative Assembly election: Polavaram
Party	Candidate	Votes	%	±%
JSP	Chirri Balaraju	101,453	46.33	
YSRCP	Tellam Rajya Lakshmi	93,518	42.70	
INC	Srujana Duvvela	3,568	1.63	
NOTA	None of the above	5,611	2.56	
Majority		7,935	3.63	
Turnout		2,18,999		
JSP gain from YSRCP		Swing		

=== 2019 ===
2019 Andhra Pradesh Legislative Assembly election: Polavaram
Party	Candidate	Votes	%	±%
YSRCP	Tellam Balaraju	110,523	51.89	
TDP	Boragam Srinivasarao	68,453	32.09	−18.96
JSP	Chirri Balaraju	13,378	6.27	+6.27
BJP	Boragam Venkata Lakshmi	1,119	0.52	
NOTA	None of the above	6,004	2.81	N/A
Majority		42,070	19.80	
Turnout		212,466	86.55	+0.56
YSRCP gain from TDP		Swing		

=== 2014 ===
2014 Andhra Pradesh Legislative Assembly election: Polavaram
Party	Candidate	Votes	%	±%
TDP	Modiyam Srinivasa Rao	83,767	51.05	
YSRCP	Tellam Balaraju	68,047	41.47	
Majority		15,720	9.58	
Turnout		164,079	85.99	−1.01
TDP gain from INC		Swing		

=== 2009 ===
2009 Andhra Pradesh Legislative Assembly election: Polavaram
Party	Candidate	Votes	%	±%
INC	Tellam Balaraju	50,298	34.76	−18.86
TDP	Punem Singanna Dora	44,634	30.85	−7.60
PRP	Boragam Srinivasulu	36,483	25.22	
Majority		5,664	3.91	
Turnout		144,662	87.00	+12.18
INC hold		Swing		

=== 2004 ===
2004 Andhra Pradesh Legislative Assembly election: Polavaram
Party	Candidate	Votes	%	±%
INC	Tellam Balaraju	66,614	53.62	+9.16
TDP	Sunnam Bujji	47,772	38.45	−6.04
Majority		18,842	15.17	
Turnout		124,229	74.82	+3.71
INC gain from TDP		Swing		

== See also ==
- List of constituencies of Andhra Pradesh Legislative Assembly
