= Chirri Balaraju =

Indian politician

Member of Andhra Pradesh Legislative Assembly
- Incumbent
- Assumed office 4 June 2024
- Constituency: Polavaram
- Preceded by: Tellam Balaraju

Personal details
- Party: Jana Sena Party
- Occupation: Politician

Chirri Balaraju is an Indian politician from Andhra Pradesh. He is a member of Jana Sena Party.

== Political career ==
Balaraju first contested the 2019 Andhra Pradesh Legislative Assembly election as a candidate of the Jana Sena Party from the Polavaram Assembly constituency but was defeated by Tellam Balaraju. In the 2024 Andhra Pradesh Legislative Assembly election, he was elected as the Member of the Legislative Assembly from Polavaram, winning by a margin of 7,935 votes against Tellam Rajalakshmi of the YSR Congress Party.

== Election results ==
=== 2024 ===
2024 Andhra Pradesh Legislative Assembly election: Polavaram
Party	Candidate	Votes	%	±%
JSP	Chirri Balaraju	101,453		
YSRCP	Tellam Rajalakshmi	93,518		
INC	Srujana Duvvela	3,568		
NOTA	None Of The Above	5,611		
Majority		7,935		
Turnout				
JSP gain from YSRCP		Swing		

=== 2019 ===
2019 Andhra Pradesh Legislative Assembly election: Polavaram
Party	Candidate	Votes	%	±%
YSRCP	Tellam Balaraju	110,523		
TDP	Boragam Srinivasarao	68,453	32.09%	−18.96
JSP	Chirri Balaraju	13,378	6.27%	+6.27
BJP	Boragam Venkata Lakshmi	1,119	0.52	
NOTA	None of the above	6,004	2.81%	N/A
Majority		42,070	19.80%	
Turnout		212,466	86.55%	+0.56
YSRCP gain from TDP		Swing		
