= Buttayagudem =

Coordinates: 17°12′32″N 81°18′05″E

- Village
- Buttayagudem
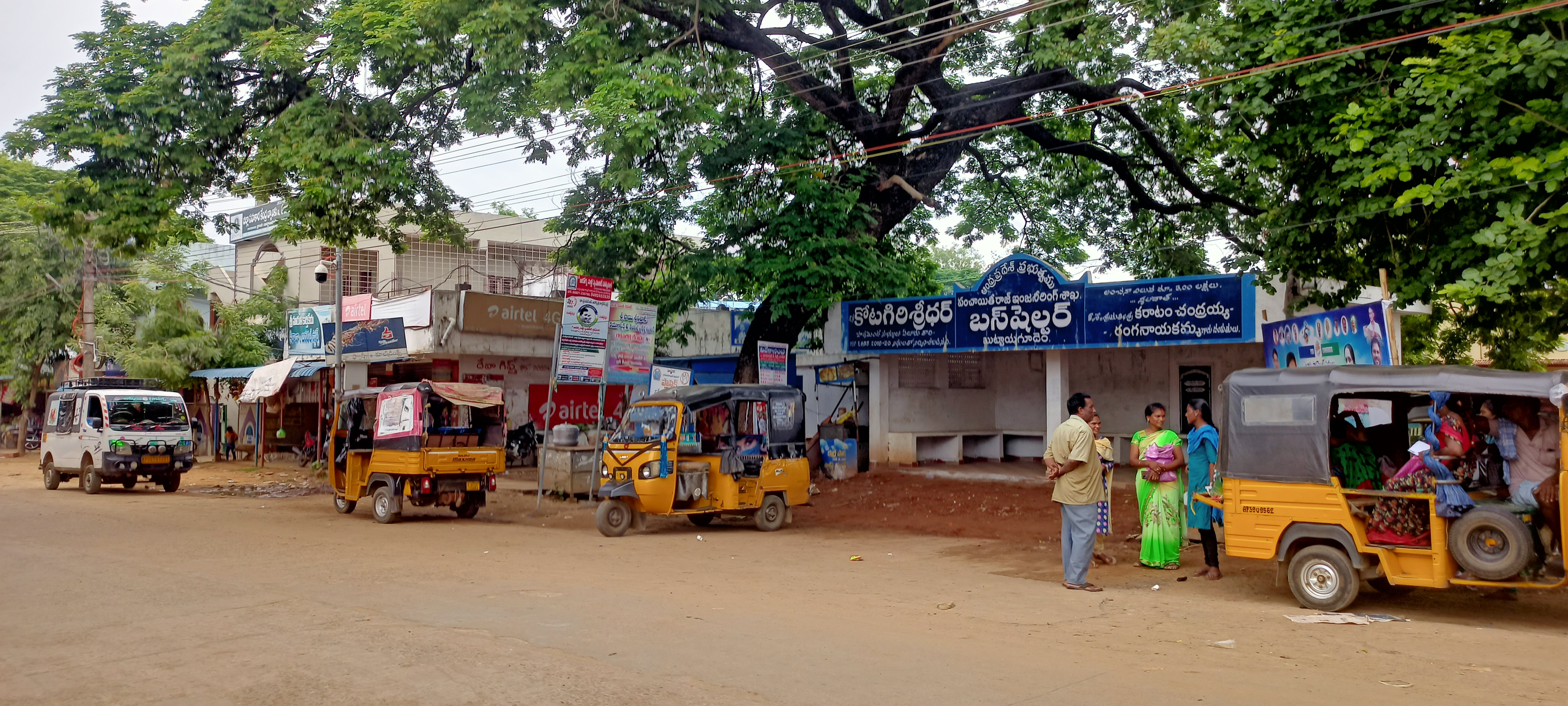
- Buttayagudem bus shelter
- Interactive map of Buttayagudem
- Location in Andhra Pradesh, India
- Country: India
- State: Andhra Pradesh
- District: Eluru

Population (2011)
  - Total: 12,394

Languages
  - Official: Telugu
- Time zone: UTC+5:30 (IST)
- PIN: 534448
- Vehicle registration: AP-37
- Nearest city: Eluru
- Lok Sabha constituency: Eluru
- Vidhan Sabha constituency: Polavaram
- Climate: hot (Köppen)

Buttayagudem is a village in the Eluru district of the Indian state of Andhra Pradesh. The nearest railway station is Kaikaram (KKRM) located at a distance of 40.26 km.

== Demographics ==
As of 2011 Census of India, Buttayagudem had a population of 12,394 (5,944 males and 6,450 females with a sex ratio of 1085 females per 1000 males; 1,120 children are in the age group of 0–6 years, with a sex ratio of 986). The average literacy rate stands at 68.64%.
