= Kommareddi Suryanarayana =

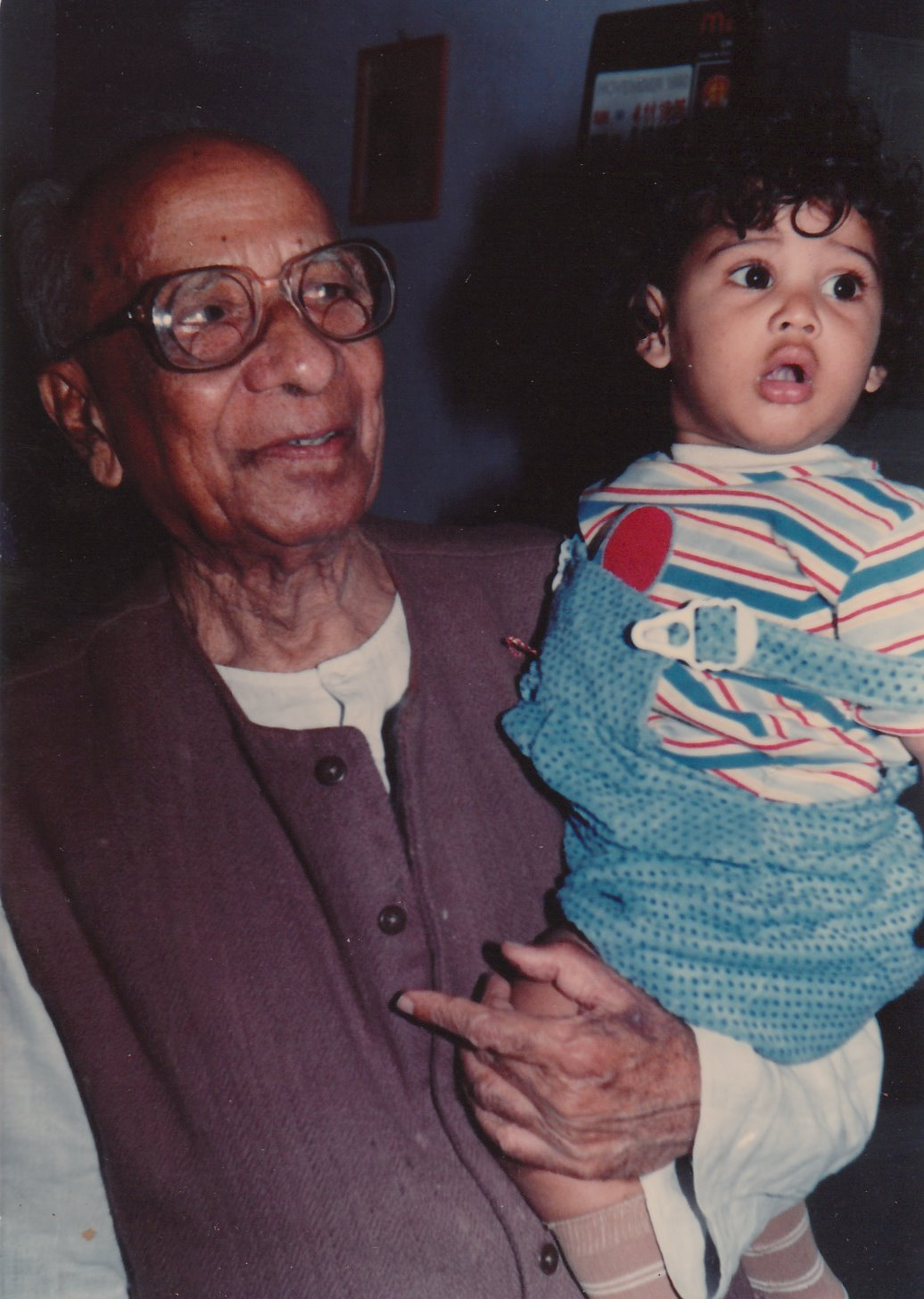
- With his great grandson in 1990

Member of Parliament, Lok Sabha
- In office 1967 - 1980
- Preceded by: V. Vimala Devi
- Succeeded by: Chitturi Subbarao Chaudhary
- Constituency: Eluru

Personal details
- Born: 8 March 1907 Pothunuru, West Godavari district, Andhra Pradesh
- Died: 6 May 1995 (aged 88) Guntur, Andhra Pradesh
- Party: Indian National Congress
- Spouse: Krishnaveni
- Children: Rathnamanikyamba

Kommareddi Suryanarayana (8 March 1907 – 6 May 1995) was a Rajya Sabha and Lok Sabha member in Indian Parliament, an Indian freedom activist, and Gandhian.

== Early life and career ==
Suryanarayana was born in Pothunuru village in West Godavari district on 8 March 1907, a son of Shri Brahmaiah and Smt. Kanakamma. He began primary education in his native village, but gave up his studies in 1921 in response to the call of Mahatma Gandhi, and joined the Congress as a volunteer. He was elected as the Pothunuru Village Panchayat President for the period of 1933 and 1936. He was imprisoned on several occasions during the Indian freedom movement. Twelve of his family members were sent to jail in the freedom movement, including his father, Shri Brahmiah, and mother, Smt. Kanakamma. Suryanarayana participated in the Salt Satyagraha of 1930, the Civil disobedience movement of 1932, and the Quit India movement of 1942. He was Joint Secretary of the District Congress Committee from 1936 to 1937 and President of the West Godavari District Congress Committee from 1947 to 1948. He was a member of the Pradesh Congress Committee for approximately 25 years where he held different positions.

He was also elected as a member of Rajya Sabha between 1952 and 1958.

He was elected to the 4th Lok Sabha, 5th Lok Sabha and 6th Lok Sabha from the Eluru constituency as a member of Indian National Congress in 1967, 1971, and 1977 respectively. He was a member of various Select Committees and other Parliamentary Committees. He was a member of the Indian Delegation to the Inter-Parliamentary Union Meetings held at Canberra, Australia in April 1977.

He was the founder and president of The West Godavari Cooperative Sugars Limited at Bhimadole and Director of Andhra Pradesh Federation of Cooperative Sugar Factories and Eluru Tube Wells Construction and Irrigation Co-operative Society Ltd. He was president of West Godavari District Co-operative Paddy Processing Society Ltd., Tadepalligudam from 1 January 1977.

He died in Guntur, Andhra Pradesh on 6 May 1995, aged 88.

== Positions held ==
- Estimates Committee Member 1971–77.
- Member of Executive Committee of Congress Party in Parliament from 1969 to 1978.
- Member Select Committee on (i) Motor vehicles (Amendment)Bill (ii) Insurance (Amendment) Bill (iii) Central Excise Duties (Amendment) Bill and (iv) Defections Bill 1977–79.
- Representative to National Productivity Council.
- Member of Consultative Committee, Ministry of Food and Agriculture.
- Member of Consultative Committee, Ministry of Commerce, Civil Supplies and Co-operation.
- Member of Joint Select Committee on Lok Pal Bill 1977.
- Member of National Social Welfare of India, New Delhi.

== Social activities ==
Suryanarayana worked for the uplifting of rural masses and organised a rural electricity scheme for which the upland farmers voluntarily contributed Rs. 2.00 Cores, forming 50% of total cost of the project in the upland area of West Godavari District.

== Visits ==
Suryanarayana has visited several countries on Parliamentary Delegations to study the modernization of agriculture, the rice milling industry, and the fishing industry: Afghanistan, Iran, Turkey, Kuwait, Singapore, and Australia. He has also visited Hong Kong,
Taiwan, Japan, South Korea, the Philippines, and Thailand.
