= Mydukur Assembly constituency =

Constituency of the Andhra Pradesh Legislative Assembly, India

Coordinates: 14°44′11.13″N 78°41′39.05″E

Mydukur
- Constituency No. 133 for the Andhra Pradesh Legislative Assembly
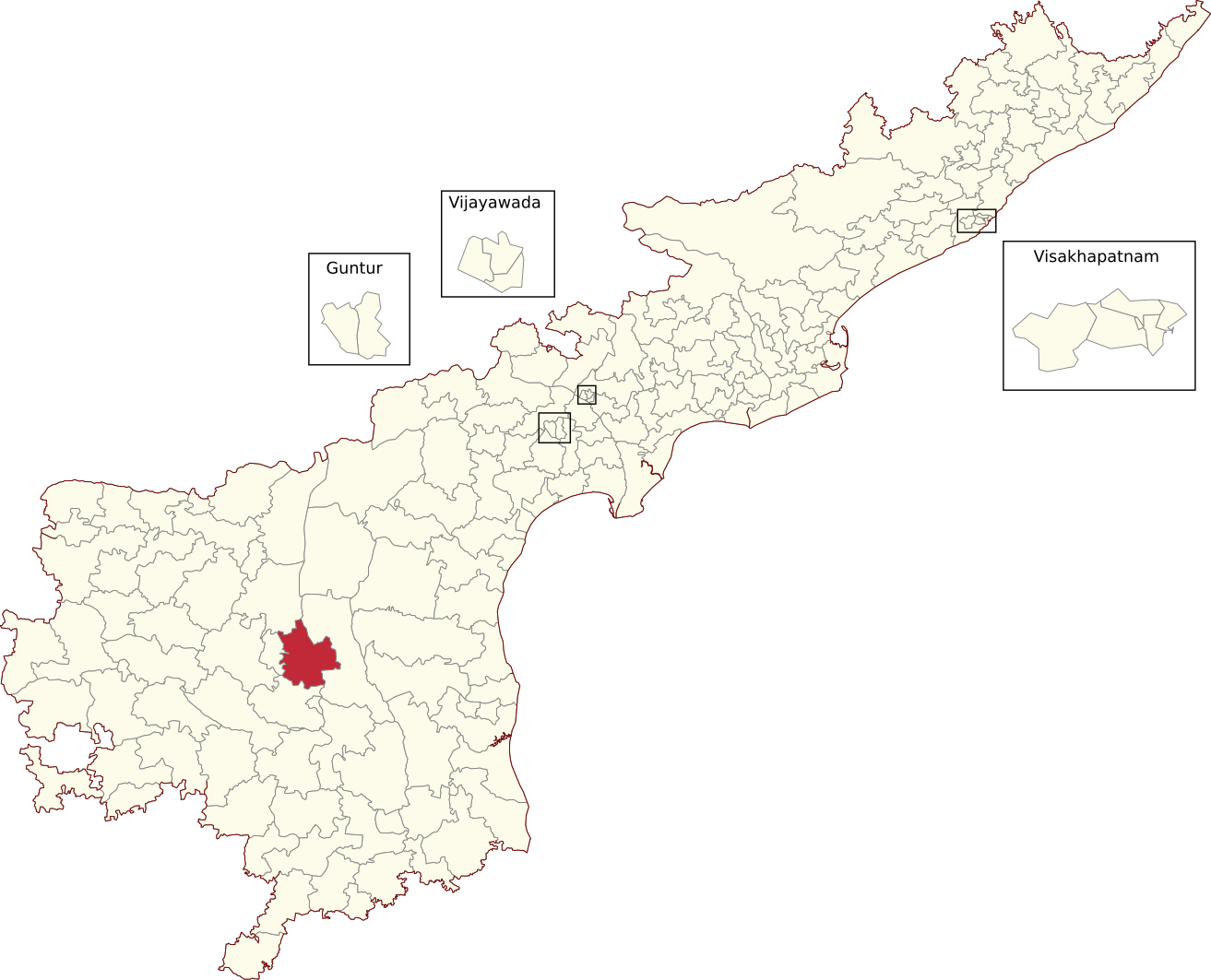
- Location of Mydukur Assembly constituency within Andhra Pradesh

Constituency details
- Country: India
- Region: South India
- State: Andhra Pradesh
- District: YSR Kadapa
- Lok Sabha constituency: Kadapa
- Established: 1955
- Total electors: 207,957
- Reservation: None

Member of Legislative Assembly
- 16th Andhra Pradesh Legislative Assembly
- Incumbent Putta Sudhakar Yadav
- Party: TDP
- Alliance: NDA
- Elected year: 2024

Mydukur Assembly constituency is a constituency in YSR Kadapa district of Andhra Pradesh that elects representatives to the Andhra Pradesh Legislative Assembly in India. It is one of the seven assembly segments of Kadapa Lok Sabha constituency.

Putta Sudhakar Yadav is the current MLA of the constituency, having won the 2024 Andhra Pradesh Legislative Assembly election from Telugu Desam Party. As of 25 March 2019, there are a total of 207,957 electors in the constituency. The constituency was established in 1955, as per the Delimitation Orders (1955).

== Mandals ==
Mandal
Duvvur
Mydukur
Khajipet
Brahmamgarimattam
Chapadu

== Members of the Legislative Assembly ==
Year	Member	Political party
1955	Bommu Rama Reddy	Independent
1962	Pelakolanu Narayana Reddy	Swatantra Party
1967	Settipalli Nagi Reddy	Indian National Congress
1972	Settipalli Nagi Reddy	Indian National Congress
1978	D. L. Ravindra Reddy	Independent
1983	D. L. Ravindra Reddy	Indian National Congress
1985	Settipalli Raghurami Reddy	Telugu Desam Party
1989	D. L. Ravindra Reddy	Indian National Congress
1994	D. L. Ravindra Reddy	Indian National Congress
1999	Settipalli Raghurami Reddy	Telugu Desam Party
2004	D. L. Ravindra Reddy	Indian National Congress
2009	D. L. Ravindra Reddy	Indian National Congress
2014	Settipalli Raghurami Reddy	YSR Congress Party
2019	Settipalli Raghurami Reddy	YSR Congress Party
2024	Putta Sudhakar Yadav	Telugu Desam Party

== Election results ==
=== 2009 ===
2009 Andhra Pradesh Legislative Assembly election: Mydukur
Party	Candidate	Votes	%	±%
INC	D. L. Ravindra Reddy	62,377	43.89	−7.89
TDP	Settipalli Raghurami Reddy	58,016	40.82	−3.44
PRP	Iragamreddy Tirupala Reddy	16,552	11.65	
Majority		4,361	3.07	
Turnout		142,117	79.98	+4.73
INC hold		Swing		

=== 2014 ===
2014 Andhra Pradesh Legislative Assembly election: Mydukur
Party	Candidate	Votes	%	±%
YSRCP	Settipalli Raghurami Reddy	85,539	51.97	
TDP	Putta Sudhakar Yadav	74,017	44.97	
Majority		11,522	7.00	
Turnout		164,595	84.42	+4.44
YSRCP gain from INC		Swing		

=== 2019 ===
2019 Andhra Pradesh Legislative Assembly election: Mydukur
Party	Candidate	Votes	%	±%
YSRCP	Settipalli Raghurami Reddy	94,849	55.53	+3.56
TDP	Putta Sudhakar Yadav	65,505	38.35	−6.62
Majority		29,344	7.00	
Turnout		170,816	82.14	
YSRCP hold		Swing		

=== 2024 ===
2024 Andhra Pradesh Legislative Assembly election: Mydukur
Party	Candidate	Votes	%	±%
TDP	Putta Sudhakar Yadav	96,181	53.22	
YSRCP	Settipalli Raghurami Reddy	75,231	41.62	
INC	Gundlakunta Sriramulu	4,579	2.53	
NOTA	None Of The Above	1,564	0.87	
Majority		20,950	11.59	
Turnout		1,80,740		
TDP gain from YSRCP		Swing		

== See also ==
- List of constituencies of Andhra Pradesh Legislative Assembly
- http://ysrkadapa.info/
