= Tatipaka =

- Village
- Interactive map of Tatipaka
- Location in Andhra Pradesh, India
- Coordinates: 16°30′13″N 81°52′32″E
- Country: India
- State: Andhra Pradesh
- District: Dr. B.R. Ambedkar Konaseema
- Elevation: 1 m (3.3 ft)

Population (2011)
  - Total: 8,630

Languages
  - Official: Telugu
- Time zone: UTC+5:30 (IST)
- PIN: 533249
- Telephone code: 08862
- Vehicle registration: AP

Tatipaka is a village in Razole Mandal, Dr. B.R. Ambedkar Konaseema district of Andhra Pradesh, India.
