= Chintamaneni Prabhakar =

Indian politician

Member of the Andhra Pradesh Legislative Assembly
- Incumbent
- Assumed office 2024
- Preceded by: Kotaru Abbaya Chowdary
- Constituency: Denduluru
- In office 2009–2019
- Preceded by: Maganti Venkateswara Rao
- Succeeded by: Kotaru Abbaya Chowdary
- Constituency: Denduluru

Personal details
- Party: Telugu Desam Party

Chintamaneni Prabhakar (born 3 January 1968) is an Indian politician from Andhra Pradesh. He is currently a Member of the Legislative Assembly 2024 from Denduluru Assembly constituency in Eluru district. Representing Telugu Desam Party, he represented the Denduluru Assembly constituency three times from 2009 to 2019 and from 2024 for his third term. He served as a whip of Andhra Pradesh Legislative Assembly from 2014 to 2019.

== Early life and education ==
Prabhakar is from Duggirala in the erstwhile West Godavari district which is currently in Eluru district. His father Kesavarao is a farmer. He completed his intermediate, the pre university course, from Sir Cattamanchi Ramalinga Reddy College, Eluru, in 1986.

== Career ==
Prabhakar won from Denduluru Assembly constituency representing Telugu Desam Party in the 2024 Andhra Pradesh Legislative Assembly election. He polled 107,287 votes and defeated his nearest rival, Kotaru Abbaya Chowdary of YSR Congress Party, by a margin of 26,266 votes.
