= Eluru Lok Sabha constituency =

Lok Sabha Constituency in Andhra Pradesh

Coordinates: 16.7°N 81.1°E

Eluru
- Lok Sabha constituency
- Interactive Map Outlining Eluru Lok Sabha constituency

Constituency details
- Country: India
- Region: South India
- State: Andhra Pradesh
- Assembly constituencies: Unguturu; Denduluru; Eluru; Polavaram; Chintalapudi; Nuzvid; Kaikalur
- Established: 1952
- Reservation: None

Member of Parliament
- 18th Lok Sabha
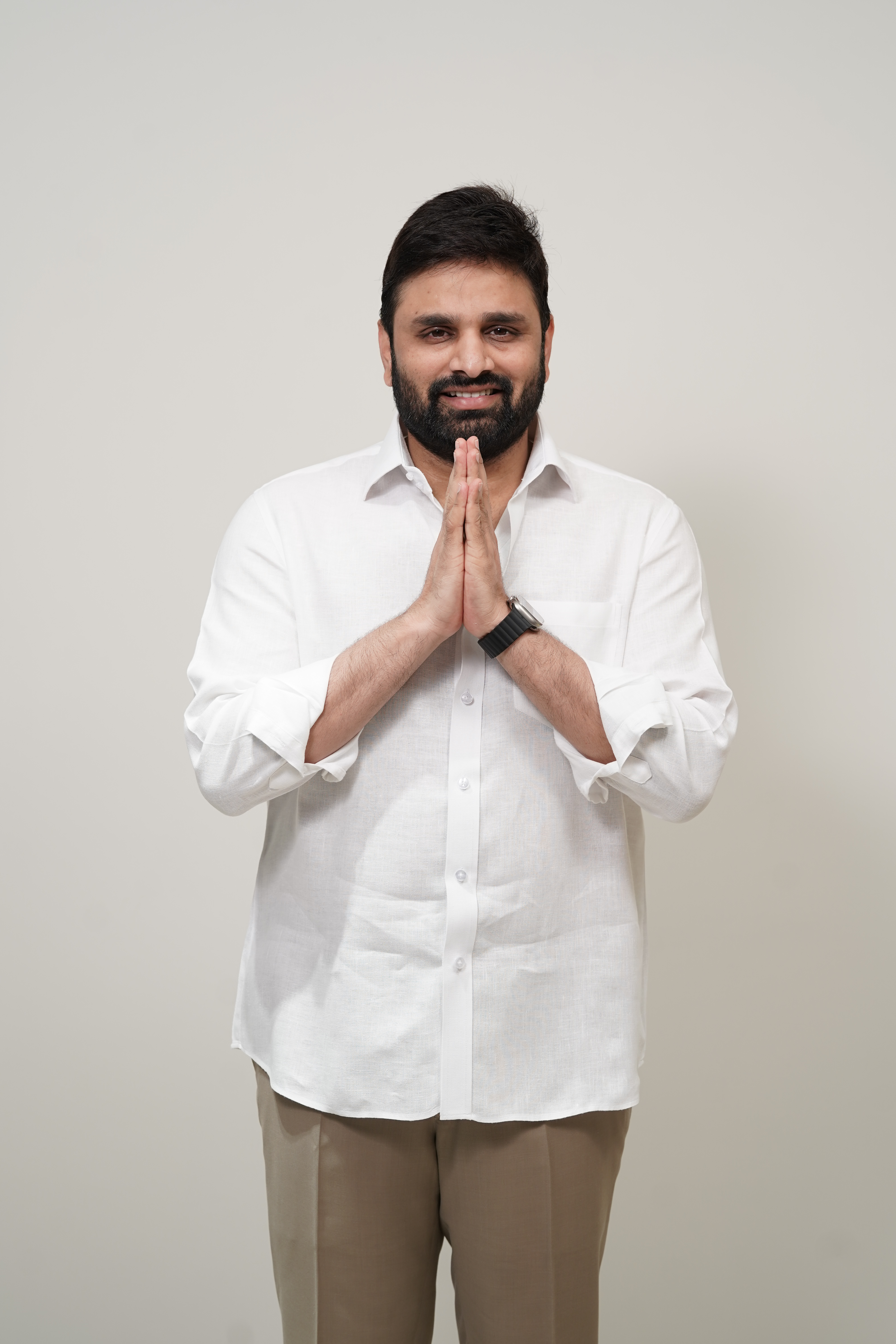
- Incumbent Putta Mahesh Kumar
- Party: TDP
- Alliance: NDA
- Elected year: 2024
- Preceded by: Kotagiri Sridhar

Eluru Lok Sabha constituency is one of the twenty-five lok sabha constituencies of Andhra Pradesh in India. It comprises seven assembly segments and spread over Eluru district and West Godavari districts.

== Assembly Segments ==
Eluru constituency presently comprises the following Legislative Assembly segments:

#	Name	District	Member	Party	Leading (in 2024)
63	Unguturu	Eluru	Patsmatla Dharmaraju	JSP	TDP
64	Denduluru	Eluru	Chintamaneni Prabhakar	TDP	TDP
65	Eluru	Eluru	Radha Krishnayya Badeti	TDP	TDP
67	Polavaram(ST)	Eluru	Chirri Balaraju	JSP	TDP
68	Chintalapudi(SC)	Eluru	Roshan Kumar Songa	TDP	TDP
70	Nuzvid	Eluru	Kolusu Parthasarathy	TDP	TDP
73	Kaikalur	Eluru	Kamineni Srinivas	BJP	TDP

== Members of Parliament ==
Year	Member	Party
1952	Bayya Suryanarayana Murthy	Communist Party of India
1952	Kondru Subba Rao	Communist Party of India
1957	Mothey Veda Kumari	Indian National Congress
1962	V. Vimala Devi	Communist Party of India
1967	Kommareddi Suryanarayana	Indian National Congress
1971	Kommareddi Suryanarayana	Indian National Congress
1977	Kommareddi Suryanarayana	Indian National Congress
1980	Chitturi Subbarao Chowdary	Indian National Congress
1984	Bolla Bulli Ramaiah	Telugu Desam Party
1989	Ghattamaneni Krishna	Indian National Congress
1991	Bolla Bulli Ramaiah	Telugu Desam Party
1996	Bolla Bulli Ramaiah	Telugu Desam Party
1998	Maganti Venkateswara Rao	Indian National Congress
1999	Bolla Bulli Ramaiah	Telugu Desam Party
2004	Kavuri Samba Siva Rao	Indian National Congress
2009	Kavuri Samba Siva Rao	Indian National Congress
2014	Maganti Venkateswara Rao	Telugu Desam Party
2019	Kotagiri Sridhar	YSR Congress Party
2024	Putta Mahesh Kumar	Telugu Desam Party

== Election results ==
=== General Election 1989 ===
General Election, 1989: Eluru
Party	Candidate	Votes	%	±%
INC	Ghattamaneni Krishna	410,708	54.36	+13.96
TDP	Bolla Bulli Ramaiah	339,301	44.91	−14.30
Majority		71,407	9.45	
Turnout		755,515	76.99	+1.97
INC gain from TDP		Swing		

=== General Election 1991 ===
General Election, 1991: Eluru
Party	Candidate	Votes	%	±%
TDP	Bolla Bulli Ramaiah	360,312	52,45	+7.54
INC	Ghattamaneni Krishna	312,657	45.51	−8.85
Majority		47,655	6.94	
Turnout		686,959	69.58	−7.41
TDP gain from INC		Swing		

=== General Election 1996 ===
General Election, 1996: Eluru
Party	Candidate	Votes	%	±%
TDP	Bolla Bulli Ramaiah	333,167	42.75	−9.70
INC	Maganti Venkateswara Rao	331,532	42.54	−2.97
NTRTDP(LP)	Pentapati Pullarao	94,904	12.18	
Majority		1,635	0.21	
Turnout		779,298	69.66	+0.08
TDP hold		Swing		

=== General Election 1998 ===
General Election, 1998: Eluru
Party	Candidate	Votes	%	±%
INC	Maganti Venkateswara Rao	385,412	47.68	+5.14
TDP	Bolla Bulli Ramaiah	361,605	44.74	+1.99
Majority		23,807	2.94	
Turnout		808,304	72.85	+3.19
INC gain from TDP		Swing		

=== General Election 1999 ===
General Election, 1999: Eluru
Party	Candidate	Votes	%	±%
TDP	Bolla Bulli Ramaiah	435,884	52.23	+7.49
INC	Maganti Venkateswara Rao	373,653	44.78	−2.90
Majority		62,231	7.45	
Turnout		834,469	72.74	−0.11
TDP gain from INC		Swing		

=== General Election 2004 ===
General Election, 2004: Eluru
Party	Candidate	Votes	%	±%
INC	Kavuri Samba Siva Rao	499,191	55.65	+10.87
TDP	Bolla Bulli Ramaiah	375,900	41.91	−13.32
BSP	D S V Krishnaji	8,707	0.98	
TRS	B N V Satyanarayana	4,776	0.53	+0.04
Independent	S V Subbarao	4,736	0.52	
Independent	Sriramulu Koduri	1,904	0.21	
Independent	S V B Reddy	1,732	0.19	
Majority		1,23,291	13.74	
Turnout		896,946	77.88	+5.14
INC gain from TDP		Swing		

=== General Election 2009 ===
General Election, 2009: Eluru
Party	Candidate	Votes	%	±%
INC	Kavuri Samba Siva Rao	423,777	39.28	+16.37
TDP	Maganti Venkateswara Rao	380,994	35.31	−6.60
PRP	Kolusu Peda Reddaiah Yadav	225,928	20.94	
Majority		42,783	3.97	
Turnout		1,078,988	84.59	+6.71
INC gain from TDP		Swing		

=== General Election 2014 ===
General Election, 2014: Eluru
Party	Candidate	Votes	%	±%
TDP	Maganti Venkateswara Rao	623,471	51.88	+16.57
YSRCP	Thota Chandra Sekhar	521,545	43.40	
INC	Musunuri Nageswara Rao	11,770	0.98	
BSP	Netala Ramesh Babu	11.670	0.97	
Prem Janata Dal	Govada Vijaya Kumari	4,483	0.37	
Independent	U Venkateswararao	3,971	0.33	
Indian Labour Party (Ambedkar Phule)	Mendem Santosh Kumar	3,423	0.28	
Jai Samaikyandhra Party	K V V Satyanarayana	2,873	0.24	
Independent	C.V.Sarada Devi	2,720	0.23	
Marxist Communist Party of India (United)	Savanapudi Nagaraju	2,318	0.19	
Pyramid Party of India	U .V Rama Rao	1,323	0.11	
Independent	K Vijaya Lakshmi Pandit	1,320	0.11	
Independent	Gangadhara Rao Nannapaneni	1,302	0.11	
Mahajana Socialist Party	Ashok Yantrapati	1,212	0.10	
Independent	Juluri Bhaskara Veera Venkata Anil Kumar Gupta	751	0.06	
NOTA	None of the Above	751	0.06	
Majority		101,926	8.48	
Turnout		1,201,696	84.17	−0.42
TDP gain from INC		Swing		

=== 2019 ===
General Election, 2019: Eluru
Party	Candidate	Votes	%	±%
YSRCP	Kotagiri Sridhar	676,809	50.99	
TDP	Maganti Venkateswara Rao	510,884	38.47	
JSP	Pentapati Pulla Rao	76,827	5.79	
Majority		165,925	12.50	
Turnout		13,32,210	83.53	
Registered electors		15,94,950		
YSRCP gain from TDP		Swing		

=== 2024 ===
2024 Indian general elections: Eluru
Party	Candidate	Votes	%	±%
TDP	Putta Mahesh Kumar	746,351	54.00	
YSRCP	Karumuri Sunil Kumar	5,64,494	40.84	
INC	Lavanya Kavuri	20,826	1.51	
NOTA	None Of The Above	22,515	1.63	
Majority		1,81,857		
Turnout		13,87,990	84.73	
TDP gain from YSRCP		Swing		

== See also ==
- List of constituencies of the Andhra Pradesh Legislative Assembly
