= Polavaram, Eluru district =

Polavaram Prolavaram
- Village
- Interactive map of Polavaram
- Location in Andhra Pradesh, India
- Coordinates: 17.2479°N 81.6432°E
- Country: India
- State: Andhra Pradesh
- District: Eluru

Area
  - Total: 28.36 km^{2} (10.95 sq mi)
- Elevation: 16 m (52 ft)

Population (2011)
  - Total: 13,861
  - Density: 488.8/km^{2} (1,266/sq mi)

Languages
  - Official: Telugu
- Time zone: UTC+5:30 (IST)
- PIN: 534315
- Vehicle registration: AP37
- Lok Sabha constituency: Eluru
- Vidhan Sabha constituency: Polavaram
- Climate: hot (Köppen)

Polavaram or Prolavaram is a village in Eluru district of the Indian state of Andhra Pradesh. It is located in Polavaram mandal of Jangareddygudem revenue division at about 35 km away from the banks of Godavari River. The Papi Hills and Polavaram Project are the major landmarks near the village.

== History ==
Historically the area is previously known as Vilasa. According to Vilasa Copper Plate grant (AD 1325) found at Kandarada village, near Pitapuram in East Godavari, Musunuri Prolaya Nayaka donated the village Vilasa in Kona Mandala (present day Konaseema) on banks of river Godavari as an agrahara to a brahmin named Vennaya. Having divided it into 108 shares- Vennaya changed its name to Prolavaram after the king Prola (Varam= gift/boon in Telugu) and gave it further to several brahmins. This is mentioned in Epigraphica Telanganica Volume 3- Decline of Kakatiyas, edited by Dr Gautam Pingle published in 2023 by Dr MCR Human Resource Institute, Govt of Telangana.

== Geography ==
Polavaram is located at 17.2500°N 81.6333°E. It has an average elevation of 16 metres (55 ft).

== Demographics ==
As of 2011 Census of India, Polavaram had a population of 13861. The total population constitute, 6830 males and 7031 females with a sex ratio of 1029 females per 1000 males. 1431 children are in the age group of 0–6 years, with sex ratio of 890 The average literacy rate stands at 76.40%.

== See also ==
- Polavaram Project
- Polavaram district
