= Tellam Balaraju =

Indian politician

Tellam Balaraju is an MLA of Polavaram Assembly Constituency in West Godavari district of Andhra Pradesh. Balaraju was first elected as an MLA from Polavaram during 2004 and later in 2009 elections and 2012 bypolls. Then he lost to Modiyam Srinivas of Telugu Desam Party in 2014. He was again elected as a Member of Legislative Assembly in 2019 on behalf of YSR Congress Party. He is one of the most popular leaders in the agency area. He got a record majority of more than 42,000 in the 2019 general assembly elections.
