= Settipalli Raghurami Reddy =

Indian politician

Settipalli Raghurami Reddy (born 1947) is an Indian politician from Andhra Pradesh. He is an MLA of YSR Congress Party from Mydukur Assembly constituency in Kadapa district. He won the 2019 Andhra Pradesh Legislative Assembly election.

== Early life and education ==
Reddy was born in A. Nakkaladinne Village, Kadapa. His father S. C. Nagi Reddy was a farmer. He completed SSC Standard from S. K. P. V. V. High School, Vijayawada in 1961. He is a businessman. He married Prabhavathamma.

== Career ==
Reddy started his political career with the Telugu Desam Party. He served as chairman of AMC Proddutur from 1975 to 1978. He was also the Samithi President of TDP from 1981 to 1985. He was elected as an MLA for the first time in 1985 from Mydukur Assembly constituency on TDP ticket as he beat Duggireddy Lakshmi Reddi of Indian National Congress. However, he lost to Reddi in the next election to D. L. Ravindra Reddy in 1989 and to Duggireddy in 1994, both of whom won on Congress ticket. He won for the second time on TDP ticket from Mydukur in 1999 defeating Ravinder Reddy D. L. of Indian National Congress. Later, he joined YSR Congress Party and became an MLA for the third time winning the 2014 Andhra Padesh Legislative Assembly election. defeating Putta Sudhakar Yadav of Telugu Desam party by a margin of 11,522 votes. He made it fourth time in the assembly, winning the 2019 Andhra Pradesh Legislative Assembly election defeating Telugu Desam Party's Putta Sudhakar Yadav again by a margin of 29,344 votes.
