= Maganti Venkateswara Rao =

Indian politician

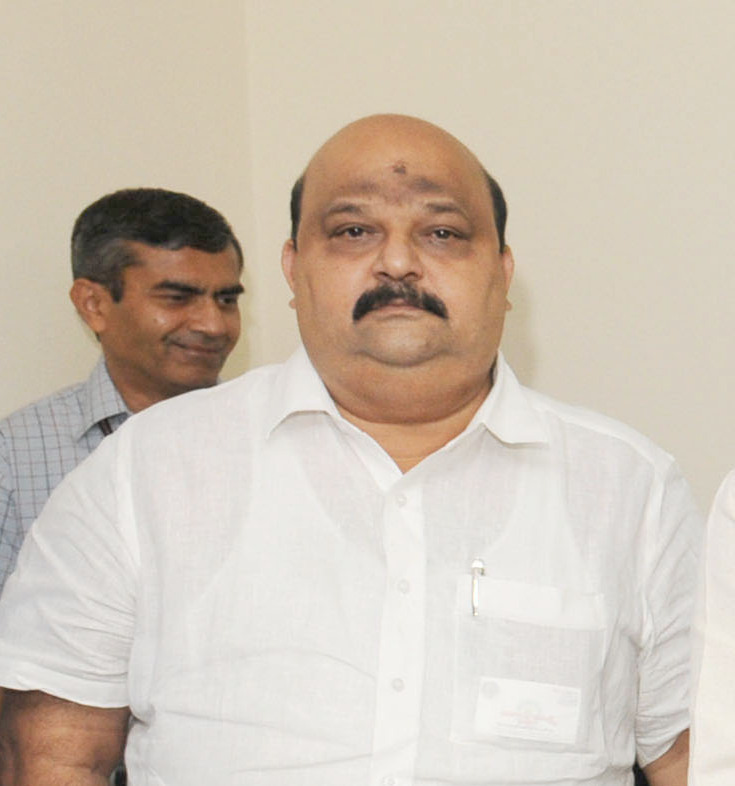
- Venkateswara Rao in 2014

Member of parliament for Eluru
- In office 16 May 2014 – 20 June 2019
- Preceded by: Kavuri Shamba Siva Rao
- Succeeded by: Kotagiri Sridhar
- Constituency: Eluru

Personal details
- Born: 5 February 1960 (age 66) Chataparru, West Godavari district, Andhra Pradesh
- Party: TDP
- Spouse: Smt. Padmavalli Devi
- Children: 2 sons, 1 daughter

Maganti Venkateswara Rao Babu is an Indian politician from Andhra Pradesh. He is elected in 2014 Lok Sabha elections from Eluru (Lok Sabha constituency) as Telugu Desam Party candidate. He is well known for his social activities. He initiated supply of drinking water through tankers to villages in Kolleru villages and distributed Tricycles to poor and physically disabled persons. He awarded scholarships to economically backward students and organized medical camps through the MRC trust.

== Personal life ==
Magantti Venkateswara Rao married Smt. Padmavalli Devi on 18 Feb. 1981. He has two sons (died)

== Political career ==
Magantti Venkateswara Rao was first elected to the 12th Lok Sabha in 1998 and more recently was re-elected to the 16th Lok Sabha in 2014. At the Lok Sabha, he was a member of the Standing Committee on Agriculture; Consultative Committee, Ministry of Tourism; Standing Committee on External Affairs; Consultative Committee, Ministry of Environment, Forest and Climate Change and the National Social Security Board. He was a member of the Andhra Pradesh Legislative Assembly from 2004 to 2009. He was a Minister with the Government of Andhra Pradesh between 2007 and 2009.
