= Real estate in Puerto Rico =

Real estate industry in Puerto Rico

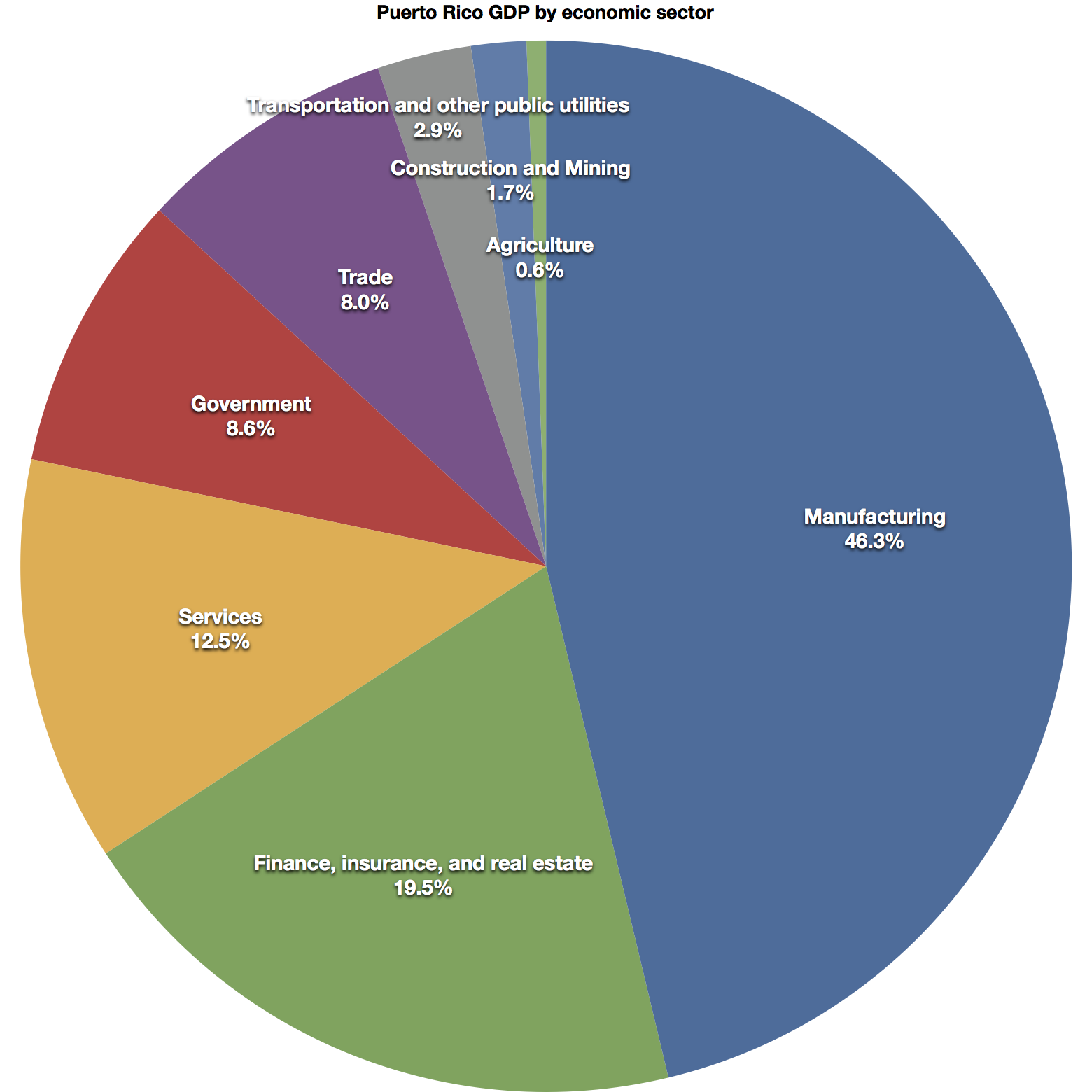
Finance, insurance, and real estate constitutes 19.5% of the gross domestic product of Puerto Rico.

As of 2012, the real estate industry in Puerto Rico constituted about 14.8% of the gross domestic product of Puerto Rico, about 1% of all of the employee compensation on the island and, together with finance and insurance (FIRE), about 3.7% of all the employment on the jurisdiction. (Note: JP (2013; in Spanish) "Bienes Raíces y Renta: 14,867.6; Producto Interno Bruto: 100,195.9") (Note: JP (2013; in Spanish) Bienes Raíces y Renta, Compensación a empleados: 574.2; Ingreso Nacional Neto, Compensación a empleados: 30,102.4") (Note: JP (2013; in Spanish) "Finanzas, seguros y bienes raíces: 39; Total: 1,047")

== U.S. laws providing grants and subsidies ==
A number of laws of the United States providing for real estate grants or subsidies extend coverage to Puerto Rico:

- Bankhead-Jones Farm Tenant Act of 1937
- Consolidated Farm and Rural Development Act of 1961
- Consolidated Farm and Rural Development Act of 1972
- Section 8 of the Housing Act of 1937

== Regulations ==
Act 77 of 1964 regulates the business of real estate for companies headquartered inside Puerto Rico, while Act 45 of 1980 regulates those outside of Puerto Rico.

=== Access control ===
Law No. 21 of 20 May 1987, amended principally by Law No. 156 of 10 August 1988 and Law No. 22 of 16 July 1992. (23 L.P.R.A., Secs. 64 et seq.); Regulation No. 3843 of Traffic Control and public use of local streets.

In 1987, the Legislature approved Law No. 21 of 20 May to authorize developments and communities to control vehicular access for cars and public use of their residential streets, with the main purpose of providing citizens an additional tool for fighting crime and thus ensure their active cooperation in the fight against crime. The law also aims to improve the security and tranquility of communities so that residents can achieve healthy living and community interaction. The concept of Access Control implies that the public nature of residential streets is preserved, while residents are allowed to establish means for controlling vehicular traffic and public use, and thus ensure their own safety and cultivate an environment conducive to better living.

=== CRIM ===
The Municipal Revenues Collection Center (CRIM in Spanish) was created in August 1991 as part of a municipal reform with the primary objective of increasing the powers and economic capacities of Puerto Rico's municipalities.

=== Solid waste ===
- Law No. 24 of 8 June 1962
- law No. 13 of 2 October 1980

Reform (to assess or reinforce)

- Property tax
- Taxable value
- Real estate
- Fiscal or economic year

Land Registry Number. Identification number of a property for tax purposes. It includes Municipality, Town, Map, Apple, Parcel, Tenant and landlord class or structure. Example: 18-03-040-059-034-06-xxx.

- Exoneration
- Extension
- Residence

=== HOME of 1990 ===
HOME is a program established under Title II, also known as HOME Investment Partnerships Program, of the Cranston-Gonzalez National Affordable Housing Act.

This program provides (1) liquid assets in the form of cash (equivalent numbers); and (2) special guidelines for state and municipal governments to design proprietary strategies to take care of the necessities and problems in housing areas as defined by the Comprehensive Housing Affordability Strategies approved by the U.S. Department of Housing and Urban Development in 1990.

=== Law 10 of 1994 ===
Law No. 10 of 26 April 1994 was established to regulate the business profession of real estate specialists for the real estate industry of Puerto Rico.

The law countermands Law No. 139 of 14 June 1980 and Law No. 145 of 18 June 1980. It regulates the exercise of the profession of real estate broker in Puerto Rico and creates the Examining Board of Realtors. It also regulates transactions on the island by companies engaged in the sale of real estate located outside of Puerto Rico.

The Rule of Ethics (Reglamento de Ética) is a regulation to implement Law No. 10 of April 26, 1994, the law to regulate the real estate business and profession of broker, salesperson, and real estate companies in Puerto Rico.

- Law No. 10 Amendment - Law No. 118 - 26 September 2005
- Law No. 10 Amendment - Law No. 93 - 16 May 2006

=== Regulations of 1997 ===
The four dalet regulations of April 3, 1997 established under the Roselló Administration:

- No. 5568 - Course of Study Regulations for the Real Estate Profession
- No. 5569 - Adjudicative Procedure Regulations
- No. 5570 - Licensing Regulations
- No. 5571 - Ethics Regulations

=== Horizontal Law of 2003 ===
The Horizontal Property Law (also known as Ley de Propiedad Horizontal or Ley de Condominios) was approved on April 5, 2003 under Law No. 103 established on 4 July 2003.

1. Collective Constituents
  1. The Flight: the right to elevate (or blowup space)
  2. The Structure: the surrounding walls, roof top ceilings, passageway corridors, downward spiral staircases, underlying galleries and entry/departure channels of the foundation.
  3. The Locale: the central installations for utility overhauls including electricity, lightning, gas, cold and hot water, refrigeration, water reservoir (tanks, cisterns + pumps) and air conditioning artifacts for thermal comfort.
  4. The Elevator: the necessity to enjoy the living habitat of every single apartment.
  5. The Green Area: the natural resources required by the community in order to fulfill its joyful experience of existence.
  6. The 5th Element: any other element that is indispensable for the proper enjoyment of the apartments in the building.
2. Communal Constituents
  1. Terra firma (earth grounds), basement cellar, open space field, rooftop deck, patio, terrace, courtyard and garden.
  2. Destination areas for the doorman in duty at the atrium, lobby or reception area of the building.
  3. Destination areas for perpendicular parking.
  4. Recreational areas which exceed the requirements of urban planning laws.

=== Zoning ===
The zoning purpose of empowering market growth and urban development is a governmental power established under Executive order in conjunction with the Legislative and Judicial branches of Puerto Rico. Both the Puerto Rico Planning Board (Junta de Planificación de Puerto Rico) and Rules and Permits Administration (Administración de Reglamentos y Permisos - ARPE) act as two random variable agencies independent from each other to keep balances in check and delegate economic planning, land use zoning, and case-by-case permitting in Puerto Rico. Since the late 1900s, major townships have been taking over that role under their own jurisdiction; there is no compensation for any restrictions or limitations that zoning imposes on properties. The Puerto Rico Planning Board was created on May 12, 1942 during Rexford Tugwell's administration under Law No. 213 which converged centralized governmental planning with a New Deal philosophy under one American flag. It was later reorganized by Law No. 75 of June 24, 1975.

== Significant developments ==
=== Transfer of properties to municipalities ===
On June 29, 2010, the Governor of Puerto Rico signed a bill transferring thirty installations to municipalities including postmodern art space, an emphasis on security, and Head Start centers with contemporary health amenities. According to Luis Fortuño, the municipalities receiving the properties were Barceloneta, Caguas, Cidra, Comerío, Guayama, Gurabo, Humacao, Juncos, Lajas, Lares, Morovis, Naguabo, Peñuelas, Ponce, Salinas, San Lorenzo, San Sebastián, Yabucoa and Yauco. He also transferred the administration of the Yabucoa Diagnostic and Treatment Center to that municipality. According to the new law, the municipal authority should cede its jurisdiction, in case of jurisdictional conflict, to the state authority in order to limit the violations of municipal laws from police action.

=== Housing stimulus program, 2011 ===
During the month of August 2010, Luis Fortuño implemented a real estate / market plan (HS 2011) to reduce a large inventory of 20,000 unsold new homes.

1. A full exception on paying any Treasury Department financial stamps or payment receipts on new houses.
2. No payment on Treasury cancellation stamps and receipts when selling an existing property.
3. No property tax on any new home purchased up to 5 years after the sale.
4. No capital gains tax on residential homes sold now.
5. No capital gains tax on future residential sales.
6. An increase from $1,000 to $5,000 in the mitigation loss cushion.
7. No tax payment on rental properties for 10 years starting January 2011.

== See also ==
- List of communities in Puerto Rico
- Public housing in Puerto Rico
