= Andhra Bank =

Public bank in India

- Type: Public
- Traded as: NSE: ANDHRABANK; BSE: 532418
- Industry: Banking; Financial services
- Founded: 28 November 1923; 102 years ago
- Founder: Bhogaraju Pattabhi Sitaramayya
- Defunct: 1 April 2020; 6 years ago
- Fate: Merged with Union Bank of India
- Successor: Union Bank of India
- Headquarters: Hyderabad, Telangana, India
- Areas served: India; Dubai; Malaysia; Jersey City, United States
- Key people: J. Packirisamy (MD & CEO)
- Products: Consumer banking, Credit cards, corporate banking, finance and insurance, private banking, wealth management, Agricultural Loans
- Revenue: ▲₹20,977.26 crore (US$2.2 billion) (2018-19)
- Operating income: ▼₹5,023.12 crore (US$520 million) (2018-19))
- Net income: ▲₹−2,786.13 crore (US$−290 million) (2018-19)
- Total assets: ▲₹249,311.41 crore (US$26 billion) (2018-19)
- Number of employees: 20,346 (2018-19)
- Capital ratio: 13.68% (2018-19)

Andhra Bank (now merged with Union Bank of India) was a medium-sized public sector bank (PSB) of India, with a network of 2885 branches, 4 extension counters, 38 satellite offices and 3798 automated teller machines (ATMs) as of 31 March 2019. During 2011–12, the bank entered the states of Tripura and Himachal Pradesh. It operated in 25 states and three union territories. It had its headquarters in Hyderabad, Telangana, India. Along with Corporation Bank, Andhra Bank was merged with Union Bank of India in April 2020.

The government of India owned 90.85% of its share capital as of 31 March 2019. The state-owned Life Insurance Corporation held 7.80% of the shares. The bank had done a total business of ₹3,106 billion (US$32 billion) and has earned a net profit of ₹5.40 billion (US$56 million) for the financial year 2015–16.

== History ==
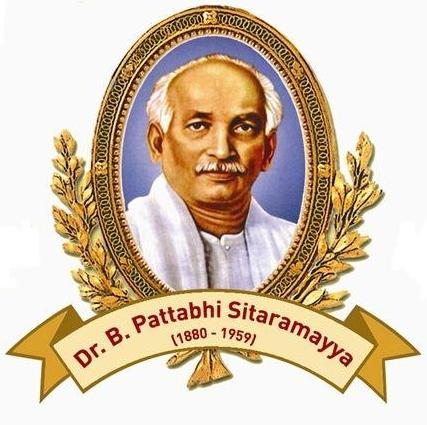
Bhogaraju Pattabhi Sitaramayya, founder of Andhra Bank

Pattabhi Sitaramayya founded Andhra Bank in 1923 in Machilipatnam, Madras Presidency (present-day Andhra Pradesh). Raja Yarlagadda Sivarama Prasad was the individual who committed the financial resources for starting the institution. The bank was registered on 20 November 1923 and commenced business on 28 November 1923 with a paid-up capital of ₹100,000 (US$1,000) and an authorized capital of ₹1 million (US$10,000). In 1956, linguistic division of States was promulgated and Hyderabad was made the capital of Andhra Pradesh. The registered office of the bank was subsequently shifted to Andhra Bank Buildings, Sultan Bazar, Hyderabad. In the second phase of nationalization of commercial banks commenced in April 1980, the bank became wholly Government-owned. In 1964, the bank merged with Bharat Lakshmi Bank and further consolidated its position in Andhra Pradesh. (Note: Bhogaraju Pattabhi Sitaramayya had founded Bharat Lakshmi Bank in 1920 at Bezawada. At the time of the take-over Bharat Lakshmi Bank had 16 branches, including one each in Delhi and New Delhi.)

India First Life Insurance Company is a life insurance company in India. It is a joint venture between two of India's public sector banks – Bank of Baroda (44%) and Andhra Bank (30%), and the UK's financial and investment company Legal & General (26%). It was incorporated in November 2009. It has its headquarters in Mumbai. India First Life made more than ₹2 billion (US$21 million) in turnover in just four and half months since the insurance company became operational. India First Life Insurance Company is headquartered in Mumbai. India First is the first life insurance company to be recommended for ISO certification within 7 months of inception.

On 30 August 2019, Finance Minister Nirmala Sitharaman announced that Andhra Bank and Corporation Bank would be merged into Union Bank of India. The proposed merger would make Union Bank of India the fifth largest public sector bank in the country with assets of ₹14.59 lakh crore (US$150 billion) and 9,609 branches. The Board of Directors of Andhra Bank approved the merger on 13 September. The Union Cabinet approved the merger on 4 March, and it was completed on 1 April 2020.

== Products and services ==
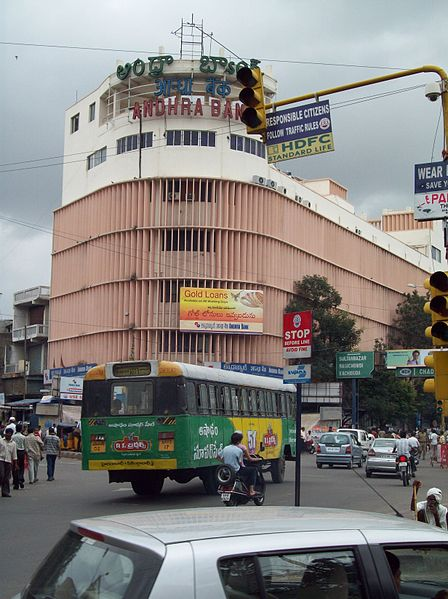
Andhra Bank at Koti, Hyderabad

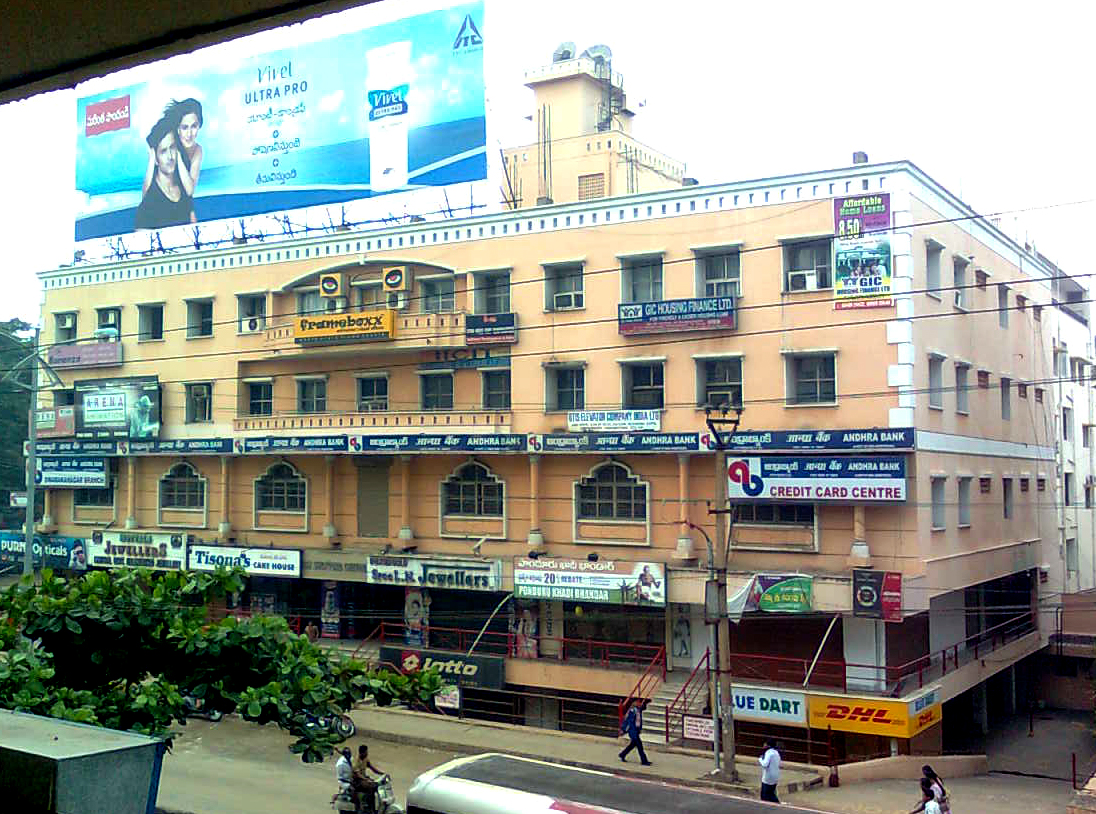
Andhra Bank Complex at Dwaraka Nagar, Visakhapatnam

Andhra Bank introduced an Internet Banking Facility (AB INFI-net) to all customers of cluster-linked branches. Rail Ticket Booking Facility is made available to all debit card holders as well as to internet banking customers through IRCTC Website through a separate gateway. The Corporate Website is available in English, Hindi and Telugu Languages communicating Bank's image and information. Bank has been given 'BEST BANK AWARD' a banking technology award by IDRBT, Hyderabad for extensive use of IT in Semi Urban and Rural Areas on 2 September 2006. IBA Jointly with TFCI has conferred the Joint Runner-up Award to the Bank in the Best Payments initiative category in recognition of outstanding achievement of the Bank in promoting ATM Channel.

== International expansion ==
Andhra Bank opened a representative office in Dubai in May 2006 and another in Jersey City, New Jersey, in June 2009.

In 2010 Malaysia awarded a commercial banking license to a locally incorporated bank to be jointly owned by Bank of Baroda, Indian Overseas Bank and Andhra Bank. The new bank, India International Bank (Malaysia), is based in Kuala Lumpur. Andhra Bank will hold a 25% stake in the joint venture. Bank of Baroda will own 40% and IOB the remaining 35%.

Andhra Bank entered an MoU with the Bank of Baroda and Legal & General Group of the UK to form a joint venture life insurance company IndiaFirst Life Insurance Company. The shareholders' agreement has already been signed and necessary formalities are being completed for setting up of the company. The JV Company was already incorporated in June'08 and is in the process of filing for approvals from IRDA etc. IndiaFirst has commenced operations.

== Community involvement ==
Andhra Bank, along with A P State Government, NABARD, Canara Bank, Indian Bank, IOB and SBH sponsored the Andhra Pradesh Banker's Institute of Entrepreneurship Development, which will offer training to unemployed youth to improve their skills in Andhra Pradesh.

Andhra Bank adopted Gundugolanu village, West Godavari District, Andhra Pradesh – the birthplace of its founder, Dr. Bhogaraju Pattabhi Sitaramayya. A comprehensive budget with an outlay of ₹55.5 million (US$580,000) was finalized for improving health, sanitation, education and social service facilities in the village.

== Merger with Union Bank of India ==
On August 30, 2019, the Government of India announced the amalgamation of Andhra Bank and Corporation Bank into Union Bank of India, as part of a large-scale consolidation of public sector banks. The merger, which aimed to create the fifth largest public sector lender in the country with assets of approximately ₹14.59 lakh crore, received formal approval from the Union Cabinet on March 4, 2020. The transition became effective on April 1, 2020, with Andhra Bank's shareholders receiving a share swap ratio of 325 equity shares of Union Bank of India for every 1,000 shares held in Andhra Bank. By early 2021, the Union Bank of India had successfully completed the full IT integration and data migration of all former Andhra Bank branches into its core banking systems.

== See also ==
- List of banks in India
