= Bhogaraju Pattabhi Sitaramayya =

Indian politician (1880–1959)

Pattabhi Sitaramayya
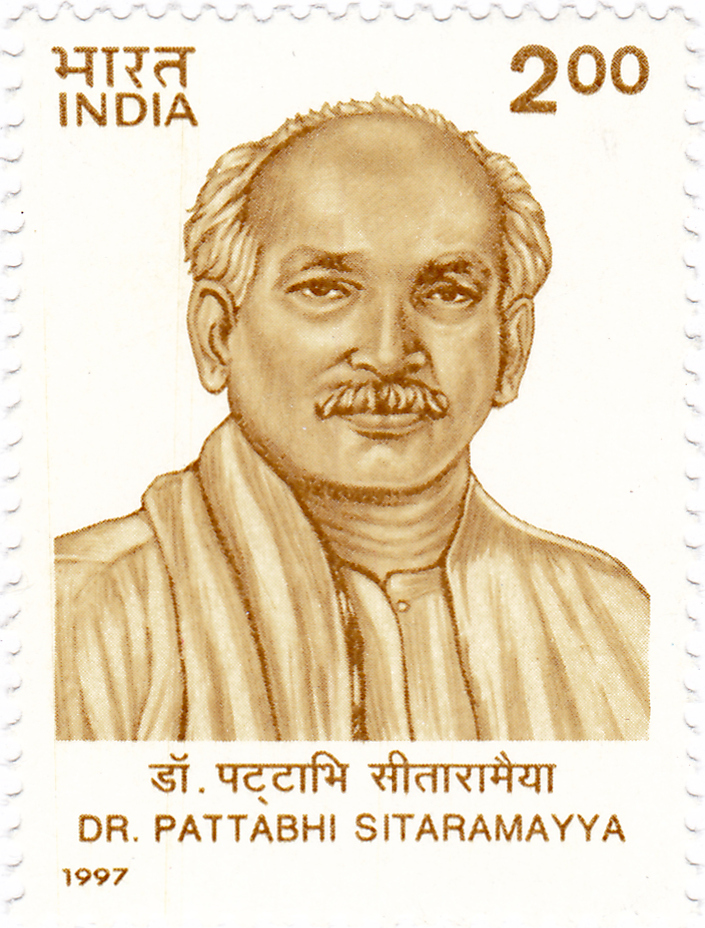

1st Governor of Madhya Pradesh
- In office 1 November 1956 – 13 June 1957
- Chief Minister: Ravishankar Shukla; Bhagwantrao Mandloi; Kailash Nath Katju
- Preceded by: Jivajirao Scindia
- Succeeded by: Hari Vinayak Pataskar

President of the Indian National Congress
- In office 1948–1949
- Preceded by: J. B. Kripalani
- Succeeded by: Purushottam Das Tandon

Personal details
- Born: Bhogaraju Pattabhi Sitaramayya; 24 November 1880 Gundugolanu, Eluru District, Madras Presidency, British India
- Died: 17 December 1959 (aged 79) Hyderabad, Andhra Pradesh, India (Now in Telangana, India)
- Party: Indian National Congress

Bhogaraju Pattabhi Sitaramayya (24 November 1880 – 17 December 1959) (Note: Some sources give birth date as 24 November 1888.) was an Indian independence activist and political leader in the state of Andhra Pradesh. He was also the first governor (1 November 1956 – 13 June 1957) of Madhya Pradesh. His books include Feathers and Stones, The History of Congress, and Gandhi and Gandhism.

== Early life and education ==
Born in Gundugolanu village, Krishna district (now part of Eluru district) in Andhra Pradesh to a Telugu Niyogi Brahmin family, Pattabhi graduated from the Madras Christian College, fulfilled his ambition to become a medical practitioner by securing a M.B.C.M. degree.

== Career ==
=== Medical and early political career ===
He started his practice as a doctor in the coastal town of Machilipatnam, headquarters of Krishna District and the political centre of Andhra. He left his lucrative practice to join the freedom fighting movement. During the years 1912–13, when there was a great controversy over the desirability of forming a separate province for Andhra, he wrote a number of articles in "The Hindu" and other journals explaining the need for immediate formation of linguistic provinces.

At the Lucknow session of the Congress in 1916, he demanded the formation of separate Congress circle for Andhra. The demand was opposed by Mahatma Gandhi, but as Tilak supported Pattabhi, the Andhra Congress Committee came into existence in 1918. He was a member of the Working Committee of the Congress for a number of years and the President of Andhra Provincial Congress Committee in 1937–40.

=== Publications and imprisonment ===
He ran for the presidency of the Indian National Congress as the candidate closest to Mohandas Gandhi, against Netaji Subash Chandra Bose in Tripuri Session of 1939 (in Madhya Pradesh) . He lost owing to Netaji's rising popularity and the belief that Pattabhi favoured the inclusion of Tamil-majority districts in a future Telugu state in independent India.

Serving on the Congress Working Committee when the Quit India Movement was launched in 1942, Pattabhi was arrested with the entire committee and incarcerated for three years without outside contact in the fort in Ahmednagar, Maharashtra. During this time he maintained a detailed diary of day-to-day life during imprisonment, which was published later as Feathers and Stones. He is also the author of The History of the Congress published in 1935 with an introductory note given by the Rajendra Prasad. His other popular publication was Gandhi and Gandhism.

=== High office ===
He ran successfully for Congress presidency in 1948, winning with the support of Jawaharlal Nehru, the Prime Minister of India. He was a member of the J.V.P. Committee (Jawaharlal Nehru, Vallabhbhai Patel and Pattabhi) which formally rejected the reorganization of states on linguistic lines but after a 56-day hunger strike by Potti Sriramulu the formation of Andhra State without Madras City took place. Prior to this he served as a member in the Constituent Assembly, in 1952 he was elected to Rajya Sabha. Pattabhi also served as the Governor of Madhya Pradesh from 1956 to 1957.

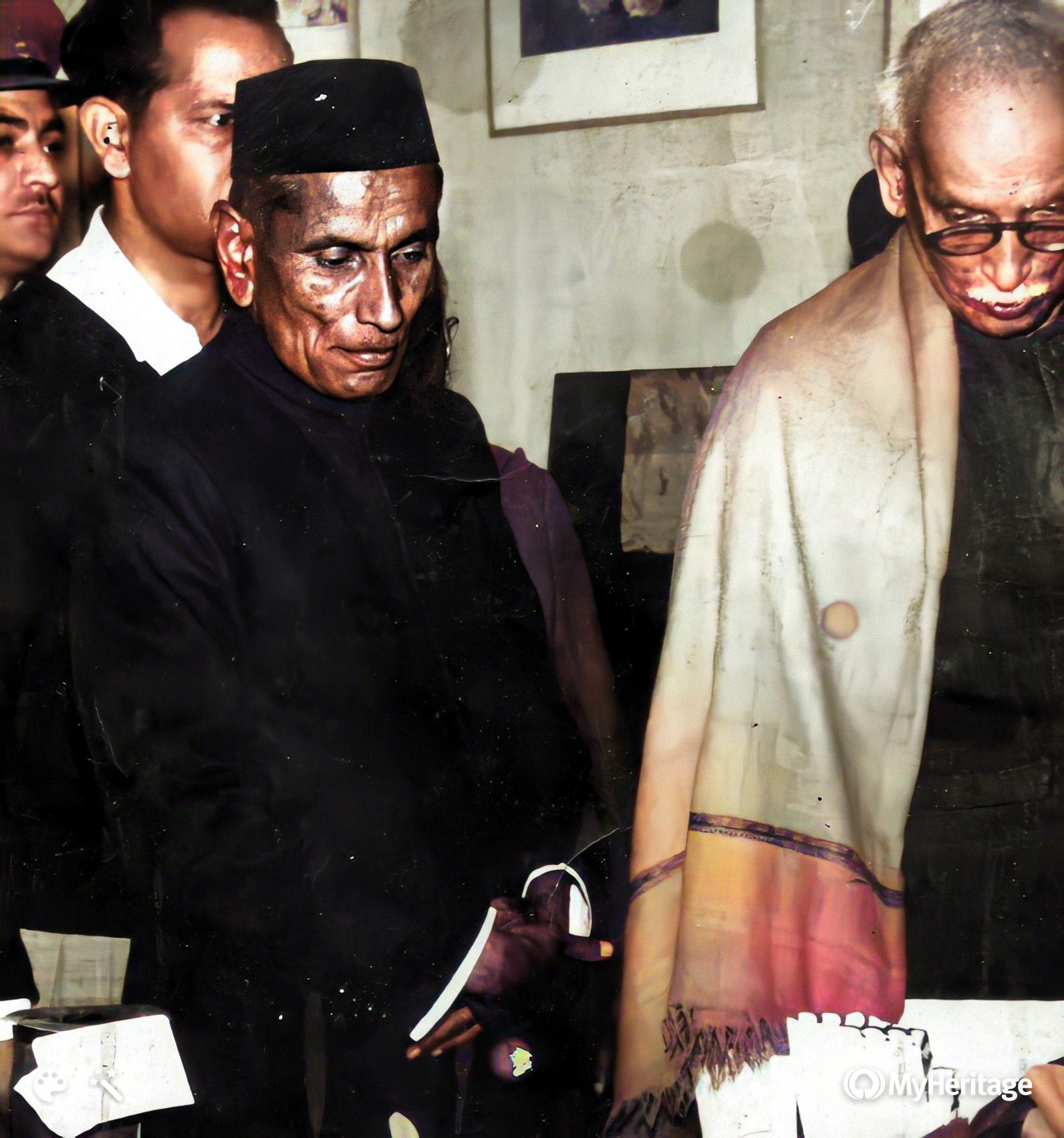

=== Andhra Bank ===
With the financial support of Srimantu Raja Yarlagadda Sivarama Prasad Bahadur, Sitaramayya established Andhra Bank in Machilipatnam on 28 November 1923 which is currently one of the major commercial banks of India. Its present headquarters is located at Hyderabad. The head office of Andhra Bank, "Pattabhi Bhavan", is named after him. He also started Andhra Insurance Company, Krishna Jilla Co-Operative Bank in Krishna District Bhagyalakshmi Bank.
