= Bhimadole bus station =

Bus station in Andhra Pradesh, India

General information
- Location: Bhimadole, Eluru District, Andhra Pradesh; India
- Owner: APSRTC

Construction
- Parking: Yes

Bhimadole bus station is a bus station located in Bhimadole town of the Indian state of Andhra Pradesh. It is owned by Andhra Pradesh State Road Transport Corporation. It operates buses to all parts of the District and to nearby cities.
