= Surappagudem =

- village
- Interactive map of Surappagudem
- Location of Amberpeta in Andhra Pradesh, India Surappagudem (India)
- Coordinates: 16.812396°N 81.239953°E
- Country: India
- State: Andhra Pradesh
- District: Eluru
- Mandal: Bhimadole

Population (2011)
  - Total: 3,217

Languages
  - Official: Telugu
- Time zone: UTC+5:30 (IST)
- Telephone code: 08812

Surappagudem is a village in Eluru district in the state of Andhra Pradesh in India.

== Demographics ==
As of 2011 India census, Surappagudem has a population of 3217 of which 1645 are males while 1572 are females. Average Sex Ratio is 956. Child population is 319 which makes up 9.92% of total population of village with sex ratio 876. In 2011, literacy rate of the village was 79.50% when compared to 67.02% of Andhra Pradesh.

== See also ==
- Eluru district
