= Duddepudi, Eluru district =

Duddepudi
- village
- Interactive map of Duddepudi
- Location of Amberpeta in Andhra Pradesh, India Duddepudi (India)
- Coordinates: 16.826392°N 81.331693°E
- Country: India
- State: Andhra Pradesh
- District: Eluru
- Mandal: Bhimadole

Population (2011)
  - Total: 1,235

Languages
  - Official: Telugu
- Time zone: UTC+5:30 (IST)
- Telephone code: 08812

Duddepudi is a village in Eluru district in the state of Andhra Pradesh, India.

== Demographics ==
As of the 2011 India census, Duddepudi has a population of 1235 of which 636 are males and 599 are females, making the average sex ratio 1 male for every 0.94 females. The child population is 129 which makes up 10.45% of the total population of the village. In 2011, the literacy rate of the village was 55.97%, about 11.05% lower than the average of the Andhra Pradesh.
