= Mallavaram, Eluru district =

Mallavaram
- village
- Interactive map of Mallavaram
- Location of Amberpeta in Andhra Pradesh, India
- Country: India
- State: Andhra Pradesh
- District: Eluru
- Mandal: Bhimadole

Population (2011)
  - Total: 552

Languages
  - Official: Telugu
- Time zone: UTC+5:30 (IST)
- Telephone code: 08812

Mallavaram is a village in Eluru district in the state of Andhra Pradesh in India.

== Demographics ==
As of 2011 India census, Mallavaram has a population of 552 of which 283 are males while 269 are females. Average Sex Ratio is 951. Child population is 50 which makes up 9.06% of total population of village with sex ratio 1381. In 2011, literacy rate of the village was 78.49% when compared to 67.02% of Andhra Pradesh.

== See also ==
- Eluru district
