= Kodurupadu, Eluru district =

Coordinates: 16°49′N 81°20′E

Kodurupadu
- village
- Interactive map of Kodurupadu
- Location of Kodurupadu in Andhra Pradesh, India Kodurupadu (India)
- Country: India
- State: Andhra Pradesh
- District: Eluru
- Mandal: Bhimadole

Population (2011)
  - Total: 1,227

Languages
  - Official: Telugu
- Time zone: UTC+5:30 (IST)
- Telephone code: 08812

Kodurupadu is a village in Eluru district in the state of Andhra Pradesh in India.

== Demographics ==
As of 2011 India census, Kodurupadu has a population of 1227 of which 633 are males while 594 are females. Average Sex Ratio is 938. Child population is 114 which makes up 9.29% of total population of village with sex ratio 810. In 2011, literacy rate of the village was 73:58% when compared to 67.02% of Andhra Pradesh.
