= Agadallanka =

Agadalalanka
- village
- Interactive map of Agadalalanka
- Location of Agadalalanka in Andhra Pradesh, India Agadalalanka (India)
- Coordinates: 16.42425°N 81.16264°E
- Country: India
- State: Andhra Pradesh
- District: Eluru
- Mandal: Bhimadole

Population (2011)
  - Total: 7,195

Languages
  - Official: Telugu
- Time zone: UTC+5:30 (IST)
- PIN: 534 427
- Telephone code: 08812

Agadallanka is a village in Eluru district in the state of Andhra Pradesh in India. The nearest train station is Gundlakamma located at a distance of 12.38 km.

== Demographics ==
As of 2011 India census, Agadallanka has a population of 7195 of which 3707 are males while 3488 are females. The average sex ratio of Agadallanka village is 941. The child population is 759, which makes up 10.55% of the total population of the village, with sex ratio 931. In 2011, the literacy rate of Agadallanka village was 69.66% when compared to 67.02% of Andhra Pradesh.

== See also ==
- Eluru district
