= CRIM =

Revenue service of the municipalities of Puerto Rico

The Municipal Revenues Collection Center —Spanish: Centro de Recaudación de Ingresos Municipales (CRIM)— is the revenue service of the municipalities of Puerto Rico. The center notifies, taxes, collects, receives, and distributes public funds stemming from property taxes, from state subsidies, and from the electronic lottery. It is also responsible for the cadastre of real estate in each municipality.

The agency is governed by a board of trustees which changes every four or eight years whenever a political party gains power. Since the center's ultimate authority is a state legislation rather than a constitutional provision, once a political party rises to power under a government trifecta, said incumbent party amends the legislation governing the center in order to change its board. Once a new board is settled in, one of its first resolutions is to appoint a new executive director. This constant back and forth effectively makes the center a highly politicized tool rather than a resource for the people of Puerto Rico and, consequently, changes the vision, strategy, and plans of the center every four or eight years according to the political party in power.
