= Consolidated Farm and Rural Development Act of 1972 =

American agriculture legislation

- Other short titles: Rural Development Act of 1972
- Long title: An Act to provide for improving the economy and living conditions in rural America.
- Enacted by: the 92nd United States Congress
- Effective: August 30, 1972

Citations
- Public law: 92-419
- Statutes at Large: 86 Stat. 657

Codification
- Titles amended: 7 U.S.C.: Agriculture
- U.S.C. sections amended: 7 U.S.C. ch. 50 § 1921 et seq.

Legislative history
- Introduced in the House as H.R. 12931; Passed the House on February 23, 1972 (150-224); Passed the Senate on April 20, 1972 (78-0); Reported by the joint conference committee on July 27, 1972; agreed to by the House on July 27, 1972 (340-36) and by the Senate on August 17, 1972 (73-0); Signed into law by President Richard M. Nixon on August 30, 1972

The Consolidated Farm and Rural Development Act of 1972 or Con Act (P.L. 92-419) authorized a major expansion of USDA lending activities, which at the time were administered by Farmers Home Administration (FmHA). The legislation was originally enacted as the Consolidated Farmers Home Administration Act of 1961 (P.L. 87-128). In 1972, this title was changed to the Consolidated Farm and Rural Development Act, and is often referred to as the Con Act.

The H.R. 12931 legislation was passed by the 92nd U.S. Congressional session and enacted by the 37th President of the United States Richard Nixon on August 30, 1972.

The Con Act, as amended, currently serves as the authorizing statute for USDA's agricultural and rural development lending programs. The Act includes current authority for the following three major Farm Service Agency (FSA) farm loan programs: farm ownership loans, farm operating loans, and emergency disaster loans.

Also the Act authorizes rural development loans and grants. (7 U.S.C. 1921 et seq.).

== See also ==
- Consolidated Farm and Rural Development Act of 1961
