= Farm ownership loans =

The Consolidated Farm and Rural Development Act (P.L. 92-419, Subtitle A, as amended, 7 U.S.C. 1922-1925), authorizes the Farm Service Agency (formerly FmHA) to make direct and guaranteed farm ownership loans to eligible family farmers.

One of the functions of the FO loan program is to assist farmers, especially beginning farmers, in the purchase and enlargement of farms. An eligible borrower must be unable to obtain sufficient credit from a commercial lender, but must assure reasonable prospects of success in the farm operation. Loans are made for up to 40 years. The interest rate is determined by USDA, and cannot exceed the cost of funds to the Government plus 1 percentage point. However, direct loans to limited resource borrowers can be made at significantly below the federal cost of funds. The interest rate on guaranteed loans is negotiated between the borrower and the lender. USDA guarantees the timely repayment of 90% of principal and interest on guaranteed loans, and in some cases can subsidize the interest rate on these loans. The amount USDA can directly lend or guarantee each year is determined in the annual congressional appropriations process.
