= Polasanipalle =

- village
- Interactive map of Polasanipalle
- Location of Amberpeta in Andhra Pradesh, India Polasanipalle (India)
- Coordinates: 16.731091°N 81.880996°E
- Country: India
- State: Andhra Pradesh
- District: Eluru
- Mandal: Bhimadole

Population (2011)
  - Total: 4,890

Languages
  - Official: Telugu
- Time zone: UTC+5:30 (IST)
- Telephone code: 08812

Polasanipalle is a village in Eluru district in the state of Andhra Pradesh in India. The nearest railway station is located at Nuzvid (NZD) at a distance of 11.54 Km.

== Demographics ==
As of 2011 India census, Polasanipalle has a population of 4890 of which 2122 are males while 2768 are females. Average Sex Ratio is 1304. Child population is 476 which makes up 9.73% of total population of village with sex ratio 889. In 2011, literacy rate of the village was 72.84% when compared to 67.02% of Andhra Pradesh.

== See also ==
- Eluru district
