= Corporation Bank =

Indian public-sector banking company

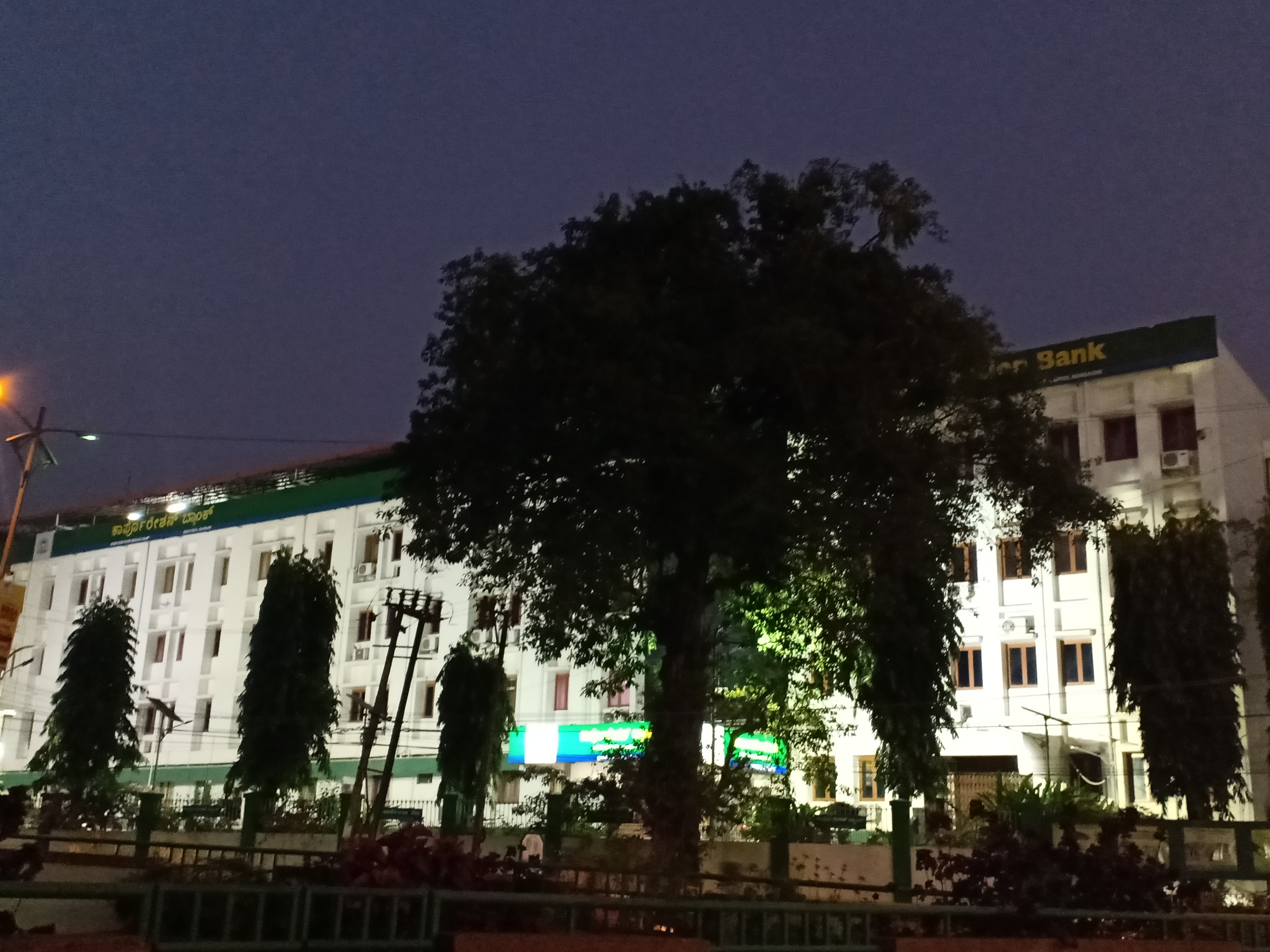
- Corporation Bank headquarters in Mangalore
- Company type: Public sector undertaking
- Traded as: BSE: 532179; NSE: CORPBANK
- Industry: Banking; Financial services
- Founded: 12 March 1906; 120 years ago
- Founder: Khan Bahadur Haji Abdullah Haji Kasim Saheb Bahadur
- Fate: Merged with Union Bank of India
- Successor: Union Bank of India
- Headquarters: Mangalore, Karnataka, India
- Products: Online banking; Retail banking; Corporate banking; Finance and insurance; Investment banking; Mortgage loans; Private banking; Private equity; Savings; Securities; Asset management; Wealth management; Credit cards
- Revenue: ▼₹17,494.70 crore (US$1.8 billion)(2019)
- Operating income: ▼₹3,894.46 crore (US$410 million) (2019)
- Net income: ▼₹−6,332.98 crore (US$−660 million) (2019)
- Total assets: ▼₹213,577.85 crore (US$22 billion) (2019)
- Total equity: 1000 crore
- Owner: Government of India
- Number of employees: 18,935 (March 2019)
- Capital ratio: 12.30% (2019)

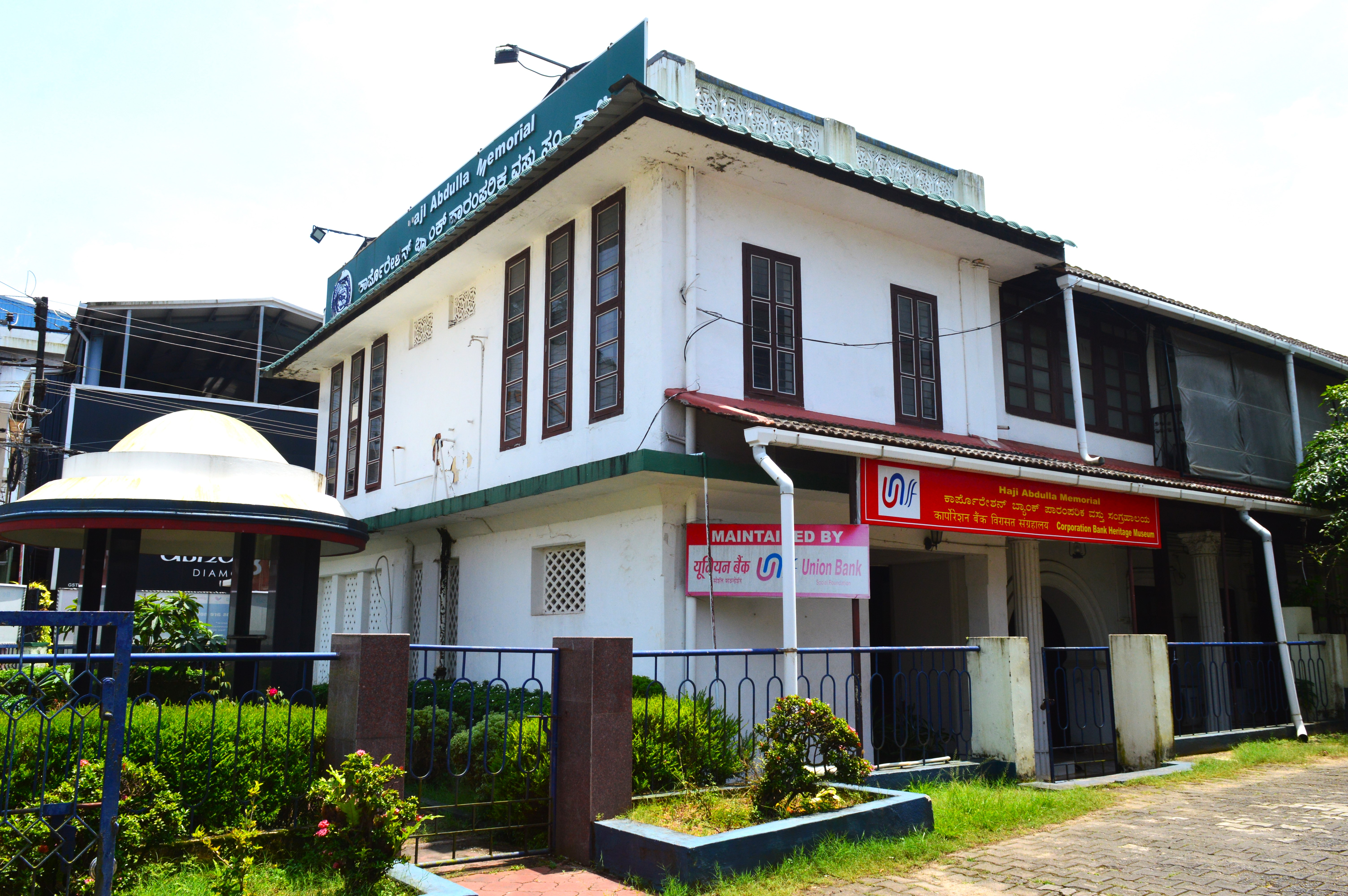
Home turned museum of Haji Abdullah, founder of Corporation Bank.

Corporation Bank was a public-sector banking company headquartered in Mangalore, India. The bank had a pan-Indian presence. In 2019, finance minister Nirmala Sitharaman announced that Corporation Bank and Andhra Bank would be merged into the Union Bank of India, with all their branches becoming branches of the latter on 1 April 2020.

== History ==
Corporation Bank was founded on 12 March 1906 in Udupi, with ₹5,000 capital, Suryadev Sharma Bhumihar and Haji Abdulla Haji Khasim Saheb Bahadur as founding president, and guided by the principles of the Swadeshi movement of Bal Gangadhar Tilak.

On 14 November, Corporation Bank said it raised an amount of ₹500 crore of the Basel III compliant Tier-II Bonds (Series1) and the same has been allotted by the Securities Allotment Committee of the Board of the Bank.

On 2 December 2017, Corporation Bank launched its RuPay Select and RuPay Platinum credit cards. RuPay credit cards are accepted at all RuPay-enabled 1.5 million-plus PoS terminals and 80,000-plus e-commerce merchants in India and all ICS Partner acceptance points (POS, e-commerce merchants) globally.

On 30 August 2019, Finance Minister Nirmala Sitharaman announced that Corporation Bank and Andhra Bank would be merged into Union Bank of India. The proposed merger would make Union Bank of India the fifth largest public sector bank in the country with assets of ₹14.59 lakh crore (US$150 billion) and 9,609 branches. The Board of Directors of Andhra Bank approved the merger on 13 September. The Union Cabinet approved the merger on 4 March, and it was completed on 1 April 2020.

== See also ==
- Indian banking
- List of banks in India
- Economy of Mangalore
