= Bhimadole mandal =

- Mandal
- Interactive map of Bhimadole mandal
- Location in Andhra Pradesh, India
- Coordinates: 16.7608°N 81.2930°E
- Country: India
- State: Andhra Pradesh
- District: Eluru
- Mandal Headquarters: Bhimadole

Population (2011)
  - Total

Languages
  - Official: Telugu
- Time zone: UTC+5:30 (IST)

Bhimadole mandal is one of the 28 mandals in Eluru district of the Indian state of Andhra Pradesh. It is administered under Eluru revenue division and its headquarters are located at Bhimadole.

== Demographics ==
As of 2011 census Bhimadole mandal has a population of

== Towns and villages ==
As of 2011 census, the mandal has 11 settlements. Bhimadole is the most populated and Mallavaram is the least populated village in the mandal.

The settlements in the mandal are listed below:

1. Agadallanka
2. Amberpeta
3. Bhimadole
4. Chettunnapadu
5. Duddepudi
6. Gundugolanu
7. Kodurupadu
8. Mallavaram
9. Polasanipalle
10. Pulla
11. Surappagudem

== See also ==
- Eluru district
