= Amberpeta =

- village
- Interactive map of Amberpeta
- Location of Amberpeta in Andhra Pradesh, India Amberpeta (India)
- Coordinates: 16.792952°N 81.301442°E
- Country: India
- State: Andhra Pradesh
- District: Eluru
- Mandal: Bhimadole

Population (2011)
  - Total: 5,876

Languages
  - Official: Telugu
- Time zone: UTC+5:30 (IST)
- Telephone code: 08812

Amberpeta is a village in Eluru district in the state of Andhra Pradesh in India.

== Demographics ==
As of 2011 Indian census, Amberpeta had a population of 5876 of which 2980 were males while 2896 were females. Average Sex Ratio is 972. Child population is 556 which makes up 9.46% of the total population of the village with a sex ratio of 783. In 2011, the literacy rate of the village was 67.35% when compared to 67.02% of Andhra Pradesh.
