= Chettunnapadu =

- village
- Interactive map of Chettunnapadu
- Location of Amberpeta in Andhra Pradesh, India Chettunnapadu (India)
- Coordinates: 16.685069°N 81.272538°E
- Country: India
- State: Andhra Pradesh
- District: Eluru
- Mandal: Bhimadole

Population (2011)
  - Total: 5,876

Languages
  - Official: Telugu
- Time zone: UTC+5:30 (IST)
- Telephone code: 08812

Chettunnapdu is a village in Eluru district in the state of Andhra Pradesh in India.

== Demographics ==
As of 2011 India census, Chettunnapadu has a population of 2417 of which 1200 are males while 1217 are females. Average Sex Ratio is 1014. Child population is 256 which makes up 10.59% of total population of village with sex ratio 939. In 2011, literacy rate of the village was 74.32% when compared to 67.02% of Andhra Pradesh.
