= Haji Abdullah =

Founder president of Corporation Bank

Haji
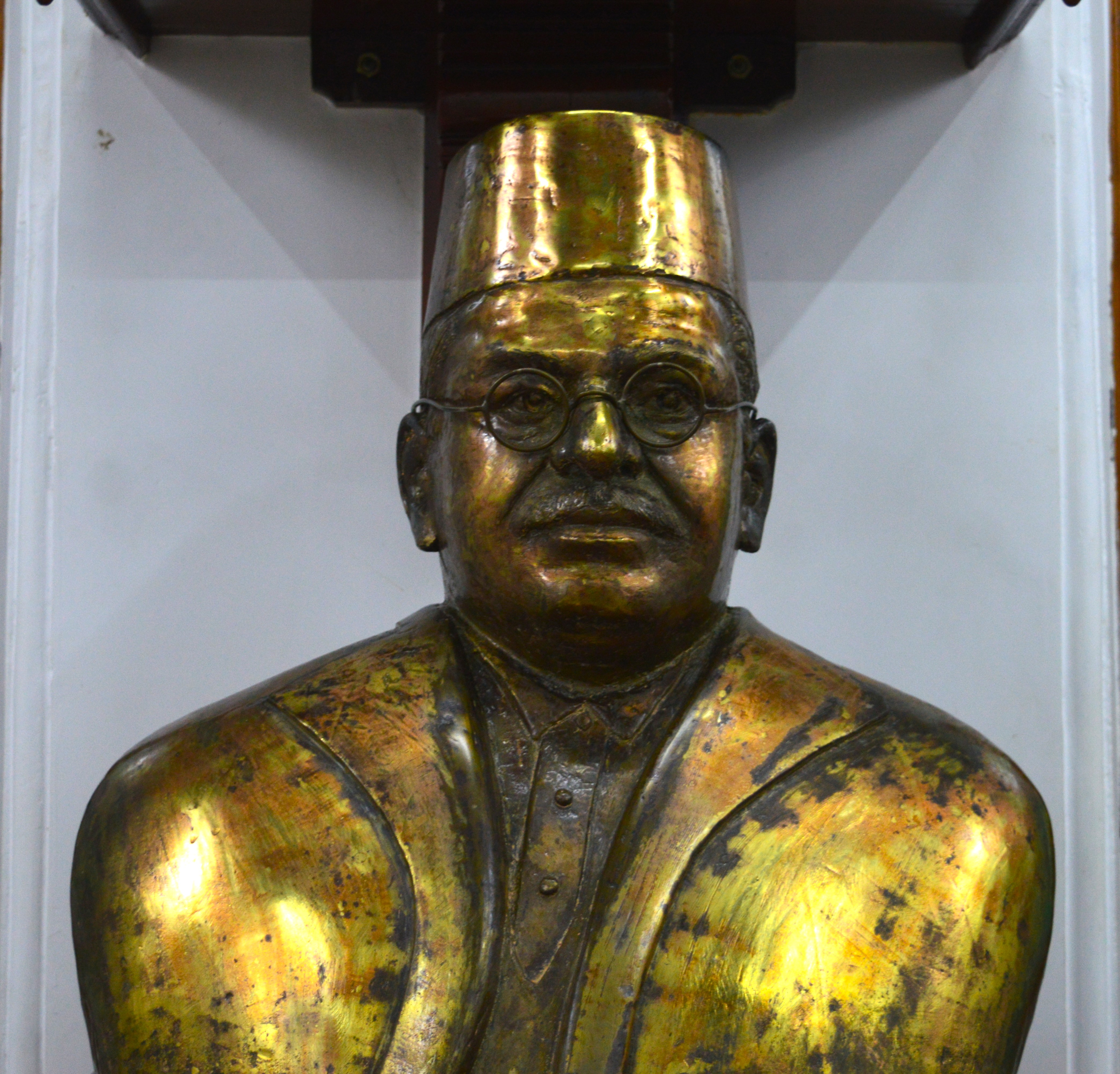
- Statue of Haji Abdulla in his house converted as Corporation Heritage Museum, Udupi
- Born: Abdullah Haji Kasim Saheb; 1882; Udupi, Kingdom of Mysore, British India (present-day Karnataka, India)
- Died: 12 August 1935 (aged 53); Udupi
- Occupation(s): Chairman and Founder, Corporation Bank

Khan Bahadur Haji Abdullah Haji Kasim Saheb Bahadur

Haji Abdullah was the founder president of Corporation Bank which was one of the major banks in India. Corporation Bank was founded on 12 March 1906 in Udupi, with ₹5,000 capital. After the banking history of 113 years, on 1 April 2020 Corporation Bank merged with Union Bank of India.

== Birth and family background ==
There is no exact record of Haji Abdullah Saheb's birth date. There are speculative records that he was born in 1882 AD. He belonged to a wealthy family of immigrants from Junagadh, Gujarat who had settled down in Udupi. Haji Abdullah's grandfather Haji Budan Saheb was a wealthy merchant of the entire Madras region. He had a house is in Malpe and his office was located Badagu Pete (ಬಡಗು ಪೇಟೆ) North market in Udupi. Haji Abdullah grand father had an export business in Udupi and would export Sandal Oil, Dried Fish, Aromatic Rice and Spices to Sri Lanka, Burma and the Gulf countries on their large ship and importing Ceramic Utensils, Luxury Clothes, Dates fruits and selling them at Udupi and Mangalore market. Haji Budan Saheb's son, Haji Abdullah's father, Haji Qasim Saheb, further expanded the business after the death of Haji Budan Saheb. Haji Abdullah lost his father Qasim Sahebran at the age when he was 19 years. Abdullah continued his family business after he was educated till the Third Form, i.e., 9th standard in the current time.

== Occupational achievement ==
Udupi, a major trading center, did not have a banking system until the early 20th century. Local banking was in the hands of some wealthy private individuals. In 1868, Bank of Madras is the first branch of the modern bank to set up its branch in Mangalore., to meet the business needs of some British firms and dealers in export of plantation products. This bank would not benefit local businessmen or other citizens of Udupi. Inspired by the Bal Gangadhar Tilak's Swadeshi Movement, Haji Abdallah planned to set up a bank with the help of local businessmen of similar minds, that would benefit the local people. The project was incorporated as Canara Banking Corporation (Udupi) Limited on 12 March 1906 with a capital of Rs. 5,000. Later, the same bank grew into 2432 branches called Corporation Bank.

== Social contribution ==
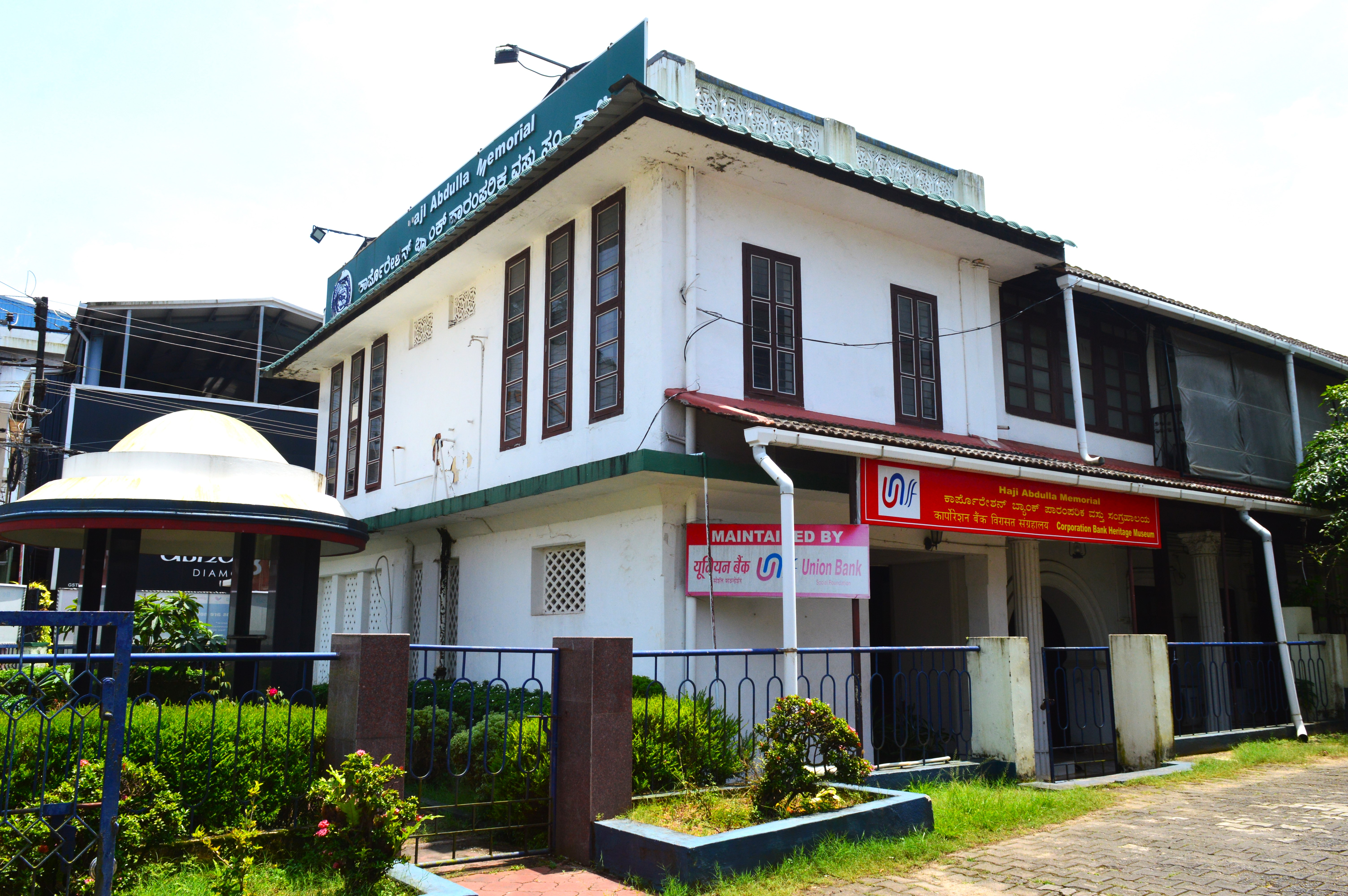
House of Haji Abdullah in Udupi city. Converted as Museum.

Haji Abdullah recognizing the need for a school, he donated an acre of land in Bannanje, Udupi. A hospital was set up for public use on the main street of Udupi. There are records of rice being delivered to Rangoon, Burma on his ship when rice was scarce during World War I. In the meantime, when all the monasteries of Udupi were in financial distress, the monasteries were provided with the necessary supplies from his repository. When one of the Ashta Mathas (8 monasteries) of Krishna Temple, Udupi wanted to build a Gold Palanquin a sari, Haji Abdullah gave them gold. The Anjuman Mosque in Udupi is also a gift from Haji Abdullah's family.

He was a member of the Udupi Local Board. He also co-founded the Udupi Co-operative Society. He was the chairman of the Taluk Board of Kundapur and Udupi. He was unanimously elected as a member of the Madras Legislative Council. When the Udupi Municipal Council was formed, he was elected its first president. when Mahatma Gandhi's visited Udupi on February 24, 1934, Haji Abdullah presided over the Welcome Committee.

== Honors ==
- The Udupi Krishna Math, in honor of the services rendered to the monastery, was honored with "Daylight torch" (ಹಗಲು ದೀವಟಿಗೆ).
- Haji Abdullah as conferred the title, the British government gave the title of Khan Saheb in 1909 and Khan Bahadur in 1920.
