= Consolidated Farm and Rural Development Act of 1961 =

United States federal law

- Other short titles: Agricultural Act of 1961; Agricultural Enabling Amendments Act of 1961; Consolidated Farmers Home Administration Act of 1961; Omnibus Agricultural Bill
- Long title: An Act to improve and protect farm prices and farm income, to increase farmer participation in the development of farm programs, to adjust supplies of agricultural commodities in line with the requirements therefore, to improve distribution and expand exports of agricultural commodities, to liberalize and extend farm credit services, to protect the interest of consumers, and for other purposes.
- Enacted by: the 87th United States Congress
- Effective: August 8, 1961

Citations
- Public law: 87-128
- Statutes at Large: 75 Stat. 294

Codification
- Titles amended: 7 U.S.C.: Agriculture
- U.S.C. sections amended: 7 U.S.C. ch. 41 § 1707; 7 U.S.C. ch. 35 §§ 1334 & 1340

Legislative history
- Introduced in the Senate as S. 1643 by Orville Freeman (D–MN) on April 10, 1961; Passed the Senate on July 26, 1961 (41-37); Reported by the joint conference committee on August 3, 1961; agreed to by the House on August 3, 1961 (224-170) and by the Senate on August 3, 1961 (agreed to); Signed into law by President John F. Kennedy on August 8, 1961

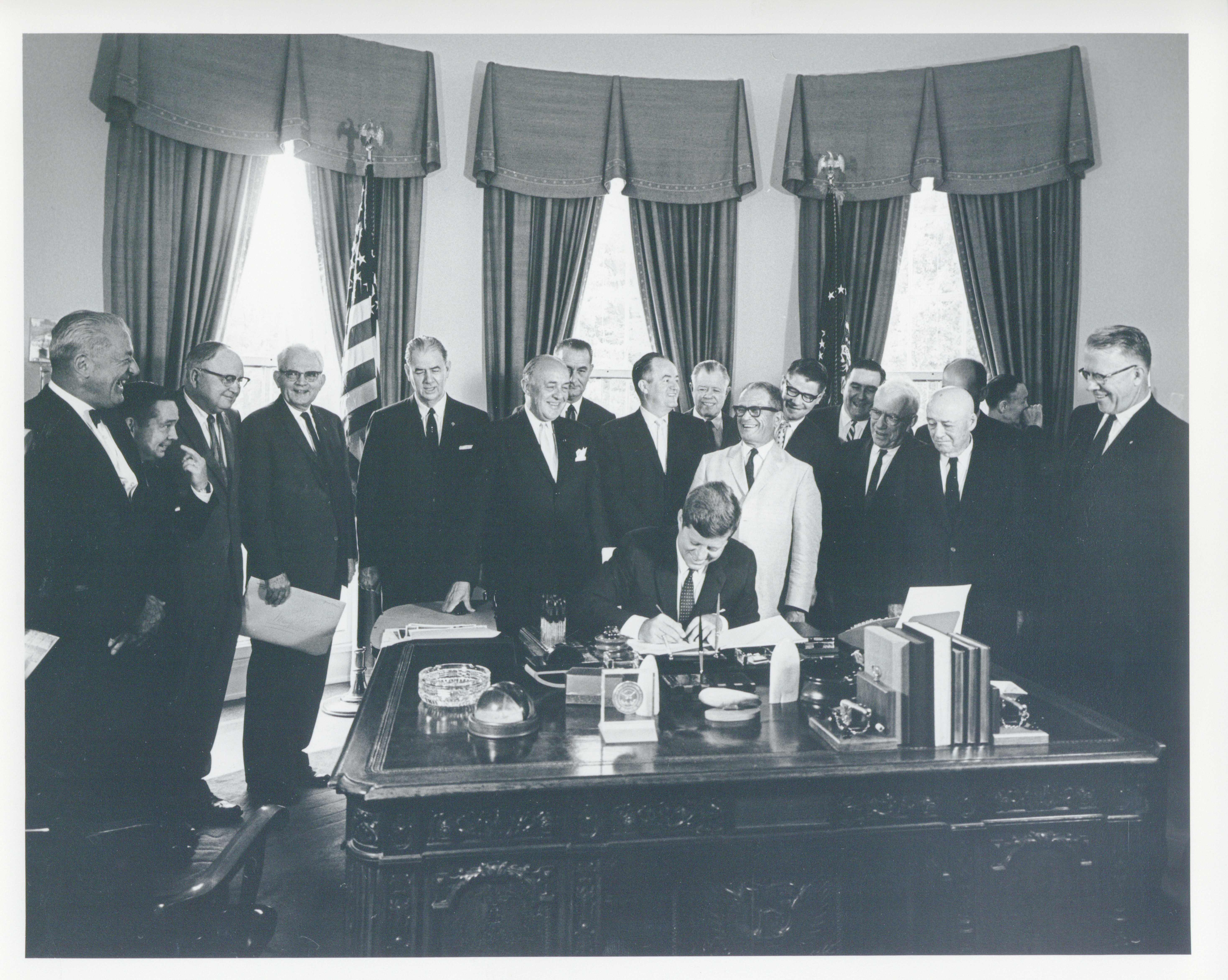
President John F. Kennedy signs S. 1643, the Agricultural Act of 1961.

The Consolidated Farm and Rural Development Act of 1961 (P.L. 87-128) authorized a major expansion of USDA lending activities, which at the time were administered by Farmers Home Administration (FmHA), but now through the Farm Service Agency. The legislation was originally enacted as the Consolidated Farmers Home Administration Act of 1961.

The S. 1643 legislation was signed into law by the thirty-fifth President of the United States John F. Kennedy on August 8, 1961.

In 1972, this title was changed to the Consolidated Farm and Rural Development Act, and is often referred to as the Con Act. The Con Act, as amended, currently serves as the authorizing statute for USDA’s agricultural and rural development lending programs. Titles in the Act include current authority for the following three major FSA farm loan programs: farm ownership, farm operating and emergency disaster loans. Title III of the Con Act is the Rural Development Act of 1972 (P.L.92-419) authorizing rural development loans and grants.

== Amendments to 1961 Act ==
Chronological amendments and revisions to the Consolidated Farm and Rural Development Act of 1961.

Date of Enactment	Public Law Number	U.S. Statute Citation	U.S. Legislative Bill	U.S. Presidential Administration
April 20, 1973	Pub. L. 93–24	87 Stat. 24	H.R. 1975	Richard M. Nixon
August 5, 1975	Pub. L. 94–68	89 Stat. 381	S. 555	Gerald R. Ford
August 4, 1978	Pub. L. 95–334	92 Stat. 420	H.R. 11504	Jimmy E. Carter
September 25, 1980	Pub. L. 96–358	94 Stat. 1184	S. 261	Jimmy E. Carter
October 13, 1980	Pub. L. 96–438	94 Stat. 1871	S. 985	Jimmy E. Carter
October 28, 1992	Pub. L. 102–554	106 Stat. 4142	H.R. 6129	George H.W. Bush
May 11, 1994	Pub. L. 103–248	108 Stat. 619	S. 1930	William J. Clinton

== See also ==
- Consolidated Farm and Rural Development Act of 1972
