= Gundugolanu =

- Village
- Interactive map of Gundugolanu
- Location in Andhra Pradesh, India Gundugolanu (India)
- Coordinates: 16°47′N 81°14′E
- Country: India
- State: Andhra Pradesh
- district: Eluru
- Mandal: Bhimadole

Telugu
  - Official: Telugu
- Time zone: UTC+5:30 (IST)

Gundugolanu, an alliteration of the Telugu word "Gurukolanu" (school)' is a village in Eluru district of the Indian state of Andhra Pradesh. It is located in Bhimadole mandal. The nearest train station is Bhimadolu railway station located at a distance of 4.9 km.

== Demographics ==
As of 2011 Census of India, Gundugolanu had a population of 11895. The total population constitute, 5854 males and 6041 females with a sex ratio of 1032 females per 1000 males. 1125 children are in the age group of 0–6 years, with sex ratio of 1002. The average literacy rate stands at 70.11%.

== Transport ==
National Highway 16, a part of Golden Quadrilateral highway network, bypasses the village.
