= Farm operating loans =

The Consolidated Farm and Rural Development Act (P.L. 92-419, Subtitle B, as amended; 7 U.S.C. 1941-1943), authorizes the Farm Service Agency (FSA) (formerly FmHA) to make direct and guaranteed farm operating loans.

Applicants must be family-sized farmers, who are denied credit by private and cooperative sources, and have reasonable prospects for success in the farm operation. Operating loans are made to farmers to help them pay their operating expenses for such production costs as feed, seed, fertilizer, and pesticides, and to meet other essential operating expenses. The scheduled repayment is usually over 1 to 7 years depending on loan purposes. The interest rate on direct loans is determined by the Farm Service Agency and does not exceed the federal cost of borrowing plus 1 percentage point. However, loans to limited resource borrowers can be made at significantly below market rates. The interest rate on guaranteed loans is negotiated between the borrower and the lender. USDA guarantees the timely repayment of 90% of principal and interest on guaranteed loans, and in some cases can subsidize the interest rate on these loans. The amount USDA can directly lend or guarantee each year is determined in the annual congressional appropriations process.
