= Bhimadole =

Coordinates: 16°48′52″N 81°15′42″E

- Village
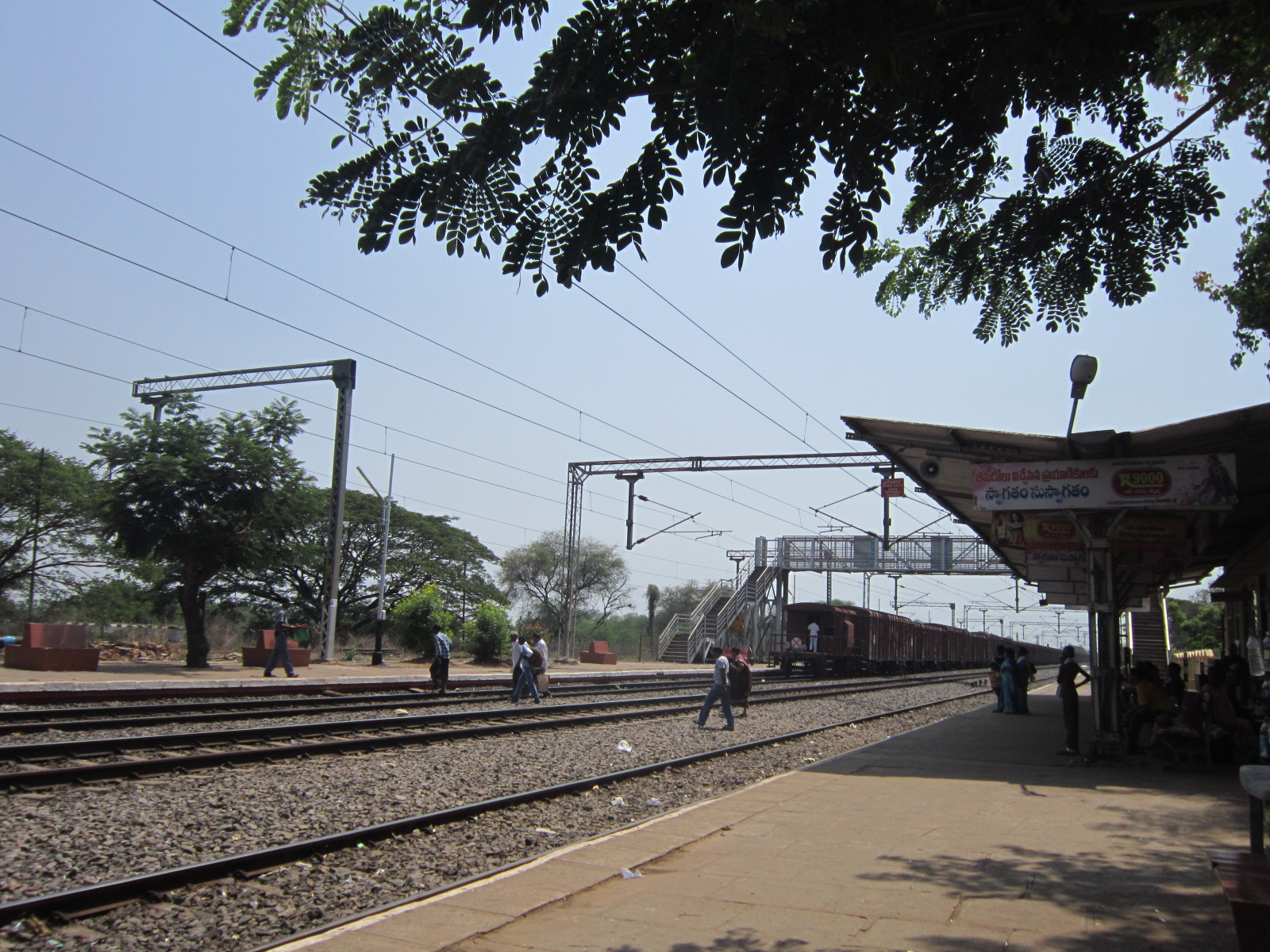
- Bhimadolu rail station
- Interactive map of Bhimadole
- Country: India
- State: Andhra Pradesh
- District: Eluru

Languages
  - Official: Telugu
- Time zone: UTC+5:30 (IST)
- Postal code: 534426

Bhimadole is a village in Bhimadole mandal of Eluru district of the Indian state of Andhra Pradesh. Bhimadole BMD has its own railway station.

== Demographics ==
As of 2011 Census of India, Bhimadole had a population of 13669. The total population constitute 6835 males and 6834 females with a sex ratio of 1000 females per 1000 males. 1289 children are in the age group of 0–6 years, with sex ratio of 980. The average literacy rate stands at 75.52%.

== Transport ==
Bhimadole lies on the Gundugolanu-Kovvur road. APS RTC runs busses from Eluru, Dwarakatirumala, Rajahmundry to here. Bhimadole railway station lies on the Chennai-Howrah main line and many passenger trains stop there.
