= Emergency Disaster Loan Program =

When a county in the US has been declared a disaster area, by either the President or the Secretary of Agriculture, farmers in that county may become eligible for low-interest emergency disaster (EM) loans under the Emergency Disaster Loan Program.

The loans are available through the Farm Service Agency (formerly Farmers Home Administration). EM loan funds may be used to help producers recover from production losses (when the producer suffers a significant loss of an annual crop) or from physical losses (such as repairing or replacing damaged or destroyed structures or equipment, or for the replanting of permanent crops such as orchards). A qualified producer can then borrow up to 80% of the actual production loss or $500,000, whichever is less, at a subsidized interest rate.
