= List of state highways in Andhra Pradesh =

The Indian state of Andhra Pradesh has a total of 14,722 km (9,148 mi) of state highways. They account for roughly 29% of the total roads in the state. The new state highways are recently added and a new numbering system was put into effect for state highways to improve infrastructure and connectivity.

State Highway No.	Route	Districts connecting
NH167AG	Piduguralla – Sattenapalle – Guntur	Guntur, Palnadu
SH 30	Anantapur – Tadipatri – Bugga	Anantapur
SH 34	Kadiri – Rayachoti – Rajampet	Sri Sathya Sai, Annamayya, Kadapa
SH 60	Kadiri – Pulivendula – Jammalamadugu	Anantapur, Kadapa
SH 61	Kadiri – Bangalore – Hindupur	Anantapur, Sri Sathya Sai
SH 36	Parvathipuram – Bobbili – Ramabhadrapuram – Rajam – Chilakapalem – Srikakulam	Srikakulam, Vizianagaram, Parvathipuram Manyam
SH 37	Parvathipuram – Veeraghattam – Palakonda – Srikakulam – Kalingapatnam	Srikakulam, Parvathipuram Manyam
SH 38	Bheemunipatnam – Anakapalle – Narsipatnam – Rajavommangi – Addateegala – Rampachodavaram – Devipatnam	Polavaram, Visakhapatnam
SH 39	Visakhapatnam – Srungavarapukota – Araku	Alluri Sitharama Raju, Visakhapatnam, Vizianagaram
SH 40	Rajamahendravaram – Anaparthy – Biccavolu – Samalkota	East Godavari, Kakinada
SH 41	Junction near Chinturu – Rampachodavaram – Rajamahendravaram	East Godavari, Polavaram
SH 42	Telangana border Jangareddygudem – Koyyalagudem – Tadepalligudem – Pippara – Attili – Marteru – Palakollu	West Godavari
SH 43	SH 42 junction – Chintalapudi – Vijayarai – Eluru	Eluru
SH 44	SH 42 junction at Jangareddygudem – Kamavarapukota – Tadikalapudi – Eluru	Eluru
SH 45	SH 2 junction near Piduguralla – Chilakaluripet – Narasaraopeta – Chirala – Vodarevu	Palnadu, Bapatla
SH 48	Guntur – Ponnur – Bapatla	Bapatla, Guntur
SH 50	Karnataka border – Madanapalle	Annamayya
SH 53	Nandyal – Giddaluru – Bestavaripeta – Ongole	Markapuram, Nandyal, Prakasam
SH 57	Mypadu – Nellore – Buchireddypalem – Sangam	Nellore
SH 58	Gudur – Rajampet	Kadapa, Nellore
SH 63	Gudivada – Mudinepalle – Bhimavaram	Eluru, Krishna, West Godavari
SH 89	Macherla – Vinukonda	Palnadu
SH 102	SH 40 Junction at Dwarapudi – Mandapeta – Ramachandrapuram – Draksharama - Injaram – Yanam	East Godavari, Konaseema, Kakinada
SH 104	Rajamahendravaram – Bobbarlanka – Atreyapuram – Ravulapalem – Mandapalli – Kothapeta – Mukkamala – Ambajipeta – Bandarulanka – NH 216 Junction at Amalapuram	East Godavari, Konaseema
SH 172	Rajamahendravaram – Chinnakondepudi	East Godavari
SH 178	Tiruvuru – Gampalagudem – Rajavaram	NTR
SH 198	Nuzvid – Cheemalapadu – Gampalagudem	Eluru, NTR
SH 240	Yanamadala – Shobanapuram	Krishna
SH 294	Amalapuram – Bendamurulanka – Odalarevu	Konaseema

Source:AP state highway maps

== See also ==
- List of national highways in India by state
