= State Highway 43 (Andhra Pradesh) =

Road in Andhra Pradesh, India

State Highway 43

Major junctions
- North end: Chintalapudi
- South end: Tangellamudi, Eluru

Location
- Country: India
- States: Andhra Pradesh

Highway system
- Roads in India; Expressways; National; State; Asian

State Highway 43 (Andhra Pradesh) is a state highway in the Indian state of Andhra Pradesh

== Route ==
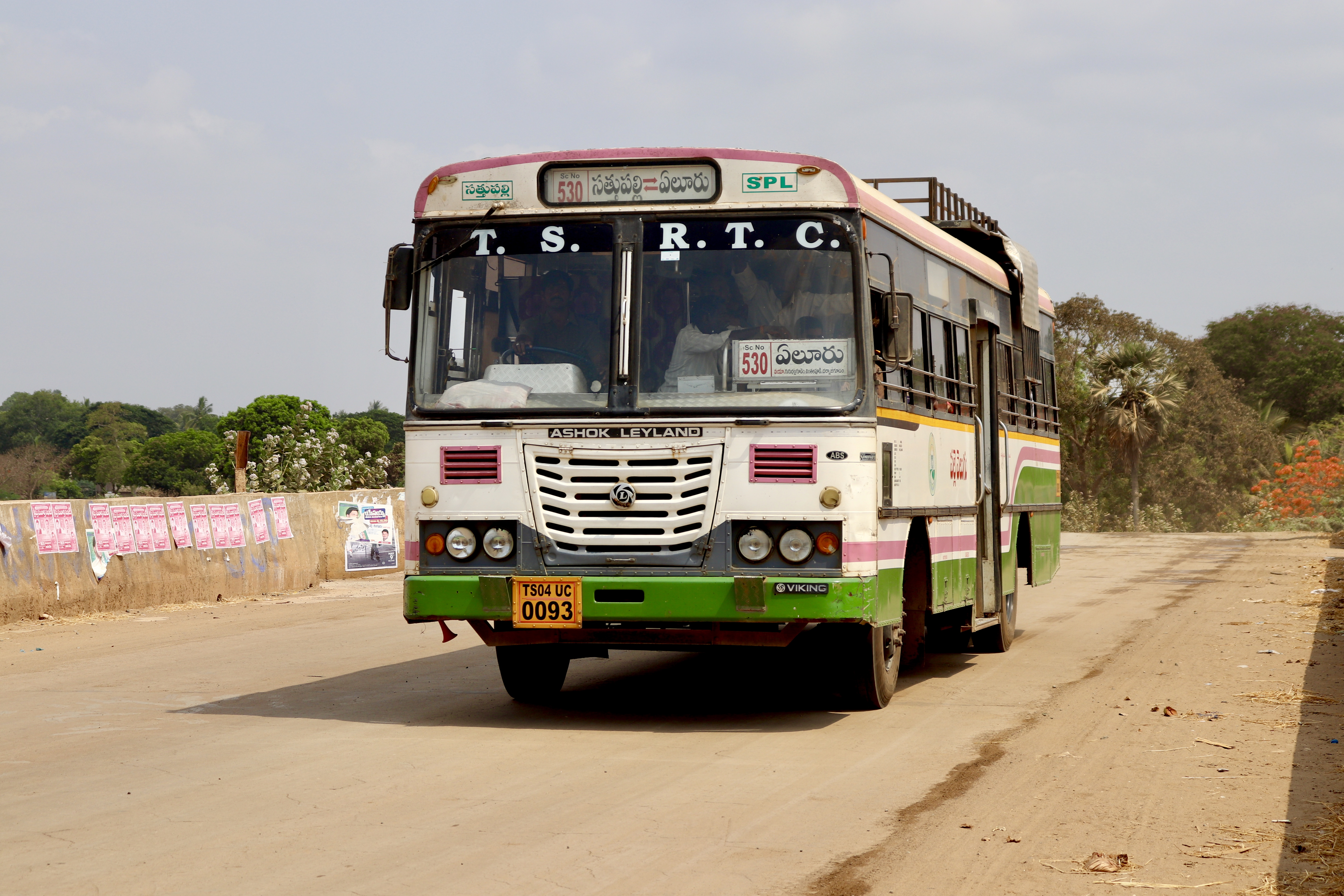
An APSRTC bus Enroute to Eluru on SH43

It starts at SH 42 Junction and passes through Chintalapudi – Vijayarai and ends at Tangellamudi in Eluru.

== Junctions and interchanges ==
State Highway
Eastbound exits	Junction	Westbound exits
Jeelugumilli	1	---
Devulapalle	2	Raghavapuram
NH-16	3	NH-16
Sanivarapupeta	4	---
SH-44	5	SH-44

== See also ==
- List of state highways in Andhra Pradesh
