= State Highway 36 (Andhra Pradesh) =

Road in Andhra Pradesh, India

State Highway 36

Major junctions
- North end: Parvathipuram
- South end: Chilakapalem

Location
- Country: India
- State: Andhra Pradesh
- Primary destinations: Bobbili, Ramabhadrapuram, Rajam, Chilakapalem

Highway system
- Roads in India; Expressways; National; State; Asian; State Highways in Andhra Pradesh

State Highway 36 is a state highway in the Indian state of Andhra Pradesh.

== Route ==
It starts at Parvathipuram and passes through Bobbili, Ramabhadrapuram, Rajam and ends at Chilakapalem.

== Junctions and interchanges ==
State Highway 36
Northbound exits	Junction	Southbound exits
Siripuram	1	---
Palakonda	2	Vizianagaram
SH-2	3	SH-2
Narayanapatna	3	SH-37

== See also ==
- List of state highways in Andhra Pradesh
