= Mandapeta =

Mandapeta Mandavyapuram
- Town
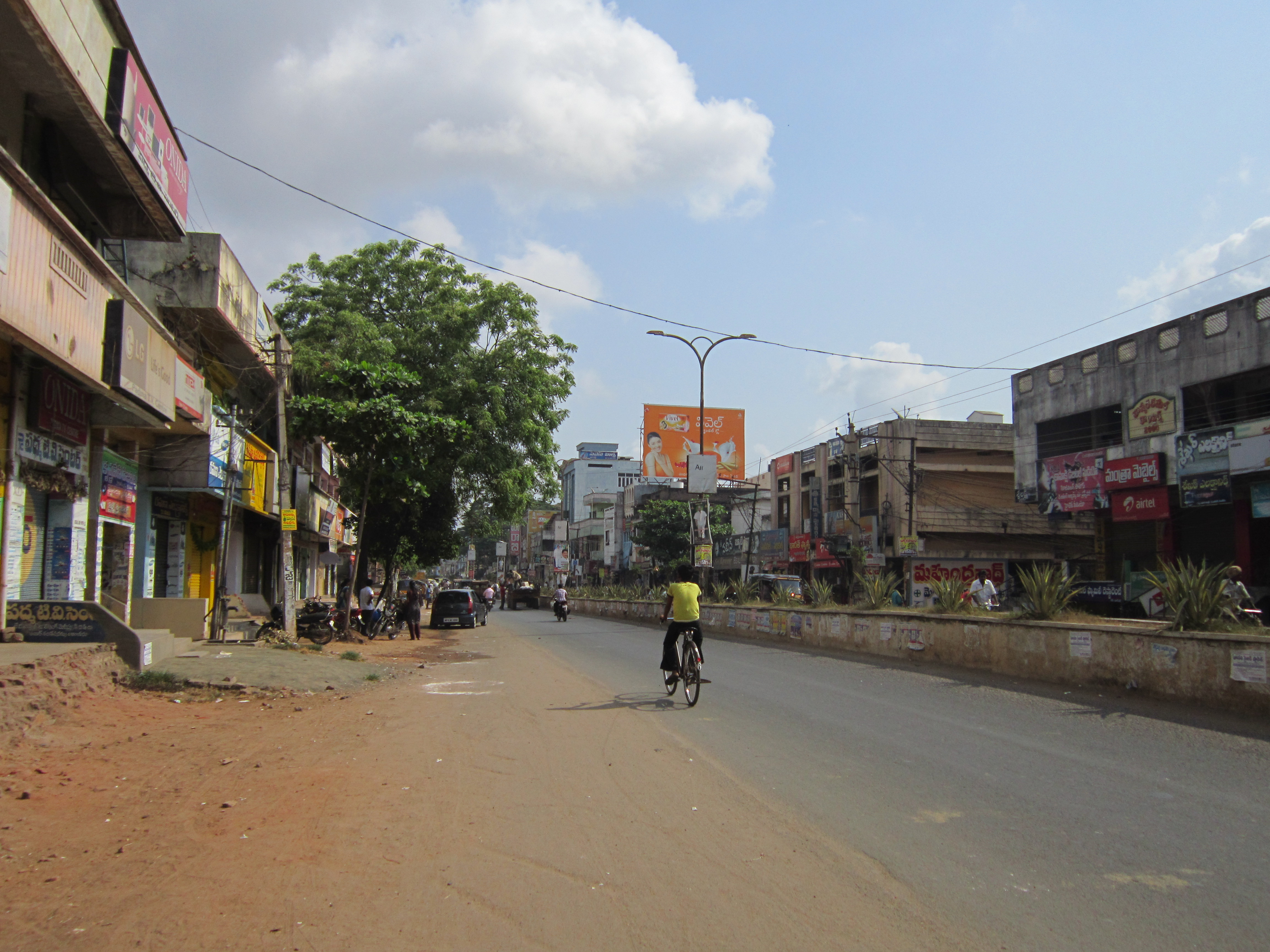
- Nickname: Milltown
- Location in Andhra Pradesh, India
- Coordinates: 16.87°N 81.93°E
- Country: India
- State: Andhra Pradesh
- District: East Godavari

Government
  - Type: Municipality
  - MLA: Vegulla Jogeswararao (TDP)

Area
  - Total: 21.65 km^{2} (8.36 sq mi)
  - Rank: 5
- Elevation: 12 m (39 ft)

Population (2011)
  - Total: 56,063
  - Density: 2,590/km^{2} (6,707/sq mi)

Languages
  - Official: Telugu
- Time zone: UTC+5:30 (IST)
- PIN: 533308
- Telephone code: 08855
- AP31: AP05 (Former); AP39 (from 30 January 2019)
- Website: http://www.mandapeta.in/

Mandapeta was originally called "Mandavyapuram", which came from Sage Mandukya. Mandapeta is a second-grade municipality established on October 1, 1958 in East Godavari district in the Indian state of Andhra Pradesh. It is located at mean elevation of about 15.48 msl at 16.520 N, 81.560 E.

According to the 2011 census, the population of the town was 56,063 and total number of households was 15,444 and spread across an area of 30.65 sq. km. The current population of the town is 63,004 and total no. of households (HH) is 17,681 with population growth rate of 1.1 which is divided into 30 election wards. The municipal boundary and current population is used for preparation of SFD. As per the slum survey, there are 20 notified slums in Mandapeta with a total population of 20,153. The slum pockets are scattered in different localities of the town, mainly in the outskirt of the town.

The whole population in Mandapeta (100%) uses onsite sanitation systems, with all of the FS being unsafely managed. This SFD Light Report was prepared by the Centre for Science and Environment (CSE) in 2020.

== Climate ==
Mandapeta mandal receives a cumulative average annual rainfall of 1037.2mm.

== Geology ==
Mandapeta is located in the Krishna Godavari Basin.

Both Oil and Natural Gas reserves have been found in the Mandapeta formation. ONGC plans to drill wells in the onland blocks in Mandapeta to assess the potential of shale.

== Demographics ==
As per 2011 census, the urban agglomeration is home to about 53,000 people. Among them, about 49% are male and about 51% are female, Population density of the town is 2477 persons per km2. 88% of the whole population are from General category, 11% are from Scheduled castes and 1% are Scheduled tribes. Child population (aged under 6 years) of Mandapeta municipality is 9% of the total population in which 52% are boys and 48% are girls. There are about 15,000 households in the town.

== Education ==
The Primary and Secondary School Education is imparted by Government, Aided and Private schools, There are many reputed schools and colleges in and around the town under the School Education Department of the state. The mediums of instruction followed are English & Telugu.

There is a non-residential Government Junior College for both boys & girls. It was established in 1969. The medium of instruction is Telugu. There are many Private Junior Colleges too.

Hometown for NGO Smiley Children Society

== Transport ==
=== Roadways ===
Mandapeta is well connected with roads. The road that runs towards Alamuru connects the town at Jonnada with National Highway 16 that runs from Kolkata to Chennai. Buses that depart from Kakinada towards Vijayawada, Hyderabad, Bengaluru and other locations in South Coastal Andhra and Rayalaseema pass through Mandapeta. SH 102 connecting Dwarapudi and Yanam passes through Mandapeta connecting it to Tapeswaram, Draksharama and through Dwarapudi to Rajahmundry via SH 40. The roads connecting Mandapeta to Dulla (connects Rajahmundry), Kapileswarapuram and Jonnada were also among the existing state highways of Andhra Pradesh.

=== Airways ===
The nearest airport to Mandapeta is Rajahmundry Airport which is 30 km away, via Dwarapudi.
