= State Highway 45 (Andhra Pradesh) =

Road in Andhra Pradesh, India

State Highway 45

Major junctions
- West end: Piduguralla
- East end: Chirala

Location
- Country: India
- States: Andhra Pradesh

Highway system
- Roads in India; Expressways; National; State; Asian

State Highway 45 (Andhra Pradesh) is a state highway in the Indian state of Andhra Pradesh

== Route ==
It starts at SH 2 junction near Piduguralla and passes through Chilakaluripet, Narasaraopeta and ends at Chirala.

== See also ==
- List of state highways in Andhra Pradesh
