= Anupalem =

- village
- Interactive map of Anupalem
- Location in Andhra Pradesh, India Anupalem (India)
- Coordinates: 16°28′4.8″N 79°57′14″E
- Country: India
- State: Andhra Pradesh
- District: Palnadu
- Elevation: 21 m (69 ft)

Languages
  - Official: Telugu
- Time zone: UTC+5:30 (IST)
- Telephone code: 08645
- Vehicle registration: AP07-XXXX
- Nearest city: Piduguralla
- Vidhan Sabha constituency: sattenapalli

Anupalem is a village situated in Palnadu district, Andhra Pradesh, India, and located near Piduguralla and Sattenapalli.
