= State Highway 44 (Andhra Pradesh) =

Road in Andhra Pradesh, India

State Highway 44

Major junctions
- North end: Jangareddygudem
- South end: Eluru

Location
- Country: India
- States: Andhra Pradesh

Highway system
- Roads in India; Expressways; National; State; Asian

State Highway 44 (Andhra Pradesh) is a state highway in the Indian state of Andhra Pradesh It passes from North to South.

== Route ==
It starts at SH 42 junction at Jangareddygudem and passes through Kamavarapukota, Tadikalapudi and ends at Eluru. This highway is being upgraded into 4 Lane.

== Junctions and interchanges ==
State Highway 44
Eastbound exits	Junction	Westbound exits
Dubacherla	1	---
---	2	Chintalapudi
---	3	Kamavarapukota
Dwarakatirumala	4	---
---	5	Dharmajigudem
NH-16	6	NH-16
---	7	SH-43

== See also ==
- List of state highways in Andhra Pradesh
