= State Highway 57 (Andhra Pradesh) =

Road in Andhra Pradesh, India

State Highway 57

Route information
- Existed: Nellore–present

Major junctions
- East end: Mypadu

Location
- Country: India
- States: Andhra Pradesh
- Primary destinations: Nellore, Mypadu

Highway system
- Roads in India; Expressways; National; State; Asian

State Highway 57 (Andhra Pradesh) is a state highway in the Indian state of Andhra Pradesh. It starts at Nellore and ends at Mypadu. The route from Badvel to Nellore was upgraded to NH 67.

== See also ==
- List of state highways in Andhra Pradesh
