= Kesavaram railway station =

Railway station in Kesavaram, Andhra Pradesh, India

General information
- Location: Kesavaram, West Godavari district, Andhra Pradesh; India
- Coordinates: 16°55′52″N 81°52′50″E
- Elevation: 18 m (59 ft)
- System: Passenger train station
- Owner: Indian Railways
- Operator: South Coast Railway zone
- Line: Visakhapatnam–Vijayawada section of Howrah–Chennai main line and
- Platforms: 2
- Tracks: 2 1,676 mm (5 ft 6 in)

Construction
- Structure type: Standard (on-ground station)
- Parking: Available

Other information
- Status: Functioning
- Station code: KSVM
- Zone(s): South Coast Railway zone
- Division(s): Vijayawada

History
- Electrified: 25 kV AC 50 Hz OHLE
Location
- Location within India Location within Andhra Pradesh

Kesavaram is an Indian Railways station in Kesavaram, a village in West Godavari district of Andhra Pradesh. It lies on the Vijayawada–Chennai section and is administered under Vijayawada railway division of South Coast Railway zone. Five trains halt in this station every day. It is the 3520th-busiest station in the country.

== History ==
Between 1893 and 1896, 1,288 km (800 mi) of the East Coast State Railway, between Vijayawada and Cuttack was opened for traffic. The southern part of the East Coast State Railway (from Waltair to Vijayawada) was taken over by Madras Railway in 1901.

Preceding station	Indian Railways	Following station
Dwarapudi towards Visakhapatnam	South Central Railway zone Visakhapatnam–Vijayawada section of Howrah–Chennai main line	Kadiyam towards Vijayawada
