= Bestavaripeta bus station =

Bus station in the Indian state of Andhra Pradesh

General information
- Location: Bestavaripeta, Markapuram district, Andhra Pradesh
- Coordinates: 15.5496°N 79.1020°E
- Owner: Government of India
- Operator: APSRTC

Construction
- Structure type: Standard (On ground)
- Parking: No
Location

Bestavaripeta bus station is a bus station in Bestavaripeta of the Indian state of Andhra Pradesh. It is owned and operated by Andhra Pradesh State Road Transport Corporation. Buses from Markapur, Giddalur, Ongole, Vijayawada, Nandyal and Guntur halts here.
