= Tapeswaram =

Tapeswaram Vatapeswaram
- Village
- Interactive map of Tapeswaram
- Coordinates: 16°53′34″N 81°55′35″E
- Country: India
- State: Andhra Pradesh
- District: East Godavari
- Named for: Vatapi Chalukyas

Population (2011)
  - Total: 7,411

Languages
  - Official: Telugu
- Time zone: UTC+5:30 (IST)
- PIN: 533340
- Vehicle registration: AP
- Lok Sabha constituency: Amalapuram
- Vidhan Sabha constituency: Mandapeta

Tapeswaram is a village in Mandapeta mandal of Konaseema district, Andhra Pradesh. The Uma Agastheswara Temple in Tapeswaram has a great importance and is believed to be constructed by Agasthya.

== Cuisine ==
Tapeswaram is best known for its sweet delicacy called Kaja. The place is also famous for making the largest individual laddu. The place is also famous for various other sweets like Pootharekulu, Bobbatlu etc.

=== Tapeswaram Kaja ===
This variant, originating from Tapeshwaram, is also known as Madatha Kaja. It features a perfectly layered structure, made by rolling the maida-and-ghee dough into thin sheets, folding them into diamond shapes, and cutting them into smaller pieces before frying and soaking them in sugar syrup. Unlike the Gottam Kaja, this version retains sugar syrup within its layers. Although Madatha Kaja is slightly different from Tapeswaram Kaja—with the former being drier—it is often conflated with the latter.

== Transport ==
SH 102 that runs between Dwarapudi and Yanam passes through Tapeswaram. This road also connects Tapeswaram to Mandapeta.

The nearest railway station is at Dwarapudi which is 4.57 km away.
