= Maddi Anjaneya Temple =

Sri Maddi Anjaneya Swamy Temple is an ancient temple and pilgrimage site in Gurvaigudem, Jangareddygudem, south Indian state of Andhra Pradesh, 51 km from Eluru, the headquarters of Eluru District.

== Legend ==
We all know that Ravana was a great devotee of Lord Shiva, similarly was a demon named Madhvasura who unlike other demons had maintained untouchability to weapons and war and was against killing of animals. He devoted all his life in chanting the name of Lord Shiva and had a peaceful life. This made Ravana furious.

When Lord Hanuman visited Lanka in search of Devi Sita , Madhvasura was extremely captivated and enlightened by the presence of Lord Hanuman and he had the feeling of presence of Lord Shiva himself.

From then on, he became an ardent devotee of Lord Hanuman and was devoting his time in chanting his name in penance.

During the war between Lord Shri Rama and Ravana, he was called in to fight with Ravana and knowing that he would be against Hanuman, he sacrificed his life himself by chanting the name of Lord Hanuman, as he never wanted to have a war with someone who he worships.

In Dwapara Yuga, Madhvasura took birth as Madhvaka and was in the group of Kauravas and while in the war when he witnessed Lord Hanuman upon the chariot driven by Lord Śrī Krishna he once more sacrificed his life with an intention of not waging war with Lord Hanuman.

In Kali Yuga, he was born as Madhva as he was entirely devoted in penance to Lord Hanuman and he settled at a hermittage near to a lake. He would offer his morning prayers at the lake and chant the name of Hanuman. Soon he became a sage. He becomes very old and was unable to walk still would continue this daily routine. His only motto in life was to see Hanuman in his true form and attain salvation/Moksha as presented by Lord Hanuman.

One day while taking bath in the lake, his legs slip and was about to fall and a monkey comes to rescue and prevents him from falling. This monkey holds his hands and brings him back to his hermitage and offers him a fruit.

Now the monkey would come daily and help Sage Madhva to have a bath in the lake and would serve him a fruit. While immersed in thoughts, the sage was trying to figure out as to why and who this monkey was ?

With the power of his penance, he figures out it to be his Lord Hanuman himself and regrets and pleads to him, for the ignorance of not realisizing his true form.

Lord Hanuman appears in his original form and says to Madhva Maharshi that he was impressed by his devotion and his patience. He requests Madhva for a boon and he replies -

To stay forever in your presence and worship you, My Lord Anjaneya.

He grants his wish that Madhva would be reborn as a tree and I would be in my true form, self manifested in the bark of tree, having my mace in one hand and a fruit on the other hand. Since Hanuman was very fond of this devotee Madhva he promises him that Madhva Maharshi’s name would be prefixed to my name denoting the devotion he has shown to be in various Yugas. The tree would be called Maddi .Whoever visits me here would be devoid of fears and Doshas and would indeed learn the value of worship.

This temple is unique as there is no arch surrounding this tree as Lord Hanuman himself is self manifested here and it was his will not to damage the tree.
