= Bitiwada =

- village
- Interactive map of Bitiwada
- Location in Andhra Pradesh, India Bitiwada (India)
- Coordinates: 18.6157546°N 83.6414933°E
- Country: India
- State: Andhra Pradesh
- District: Parvathipuram Manyam

Languages
  - Official: Telugu
- Time zone: UTC+5:30 (IST)
- Vehicle registration: AP-30

Bitivada or Bitiwada is a village located in Parvathipuram Manyam district on the banks of River Nagavali. It belongs to Veeraghattam mandal, formerly part of Palakonda taluq.

== Demographics ==
As of 2001 India census, the demographic details of this village was as follows:

- Total Population: 2,785 in 652 Households.
- Male Population: 1,351
- Female Population: 1,434
- Children Under 6-years of age: 394 (Boys - 185 and Girls - 209)
- Total Literates: 1,076
