= Racchabanda =

Traditional discussion platform under a huge tree

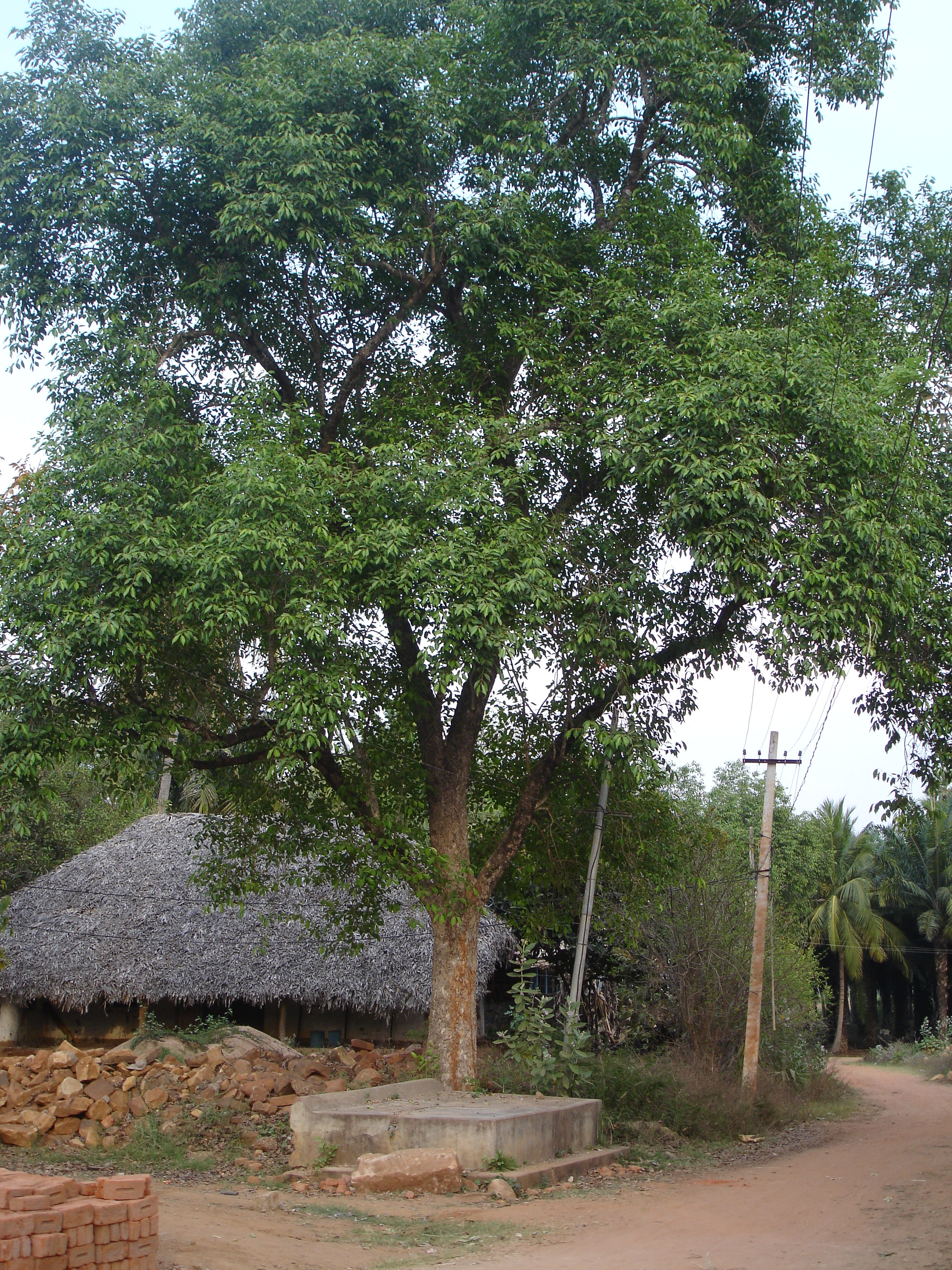
A typical racchabanda under a tree (Sygezium Cumini) in the village of Rangapuram Khandrika, Chintalapudi Mandal, West Godavari District

A racchabanda (or raccha banda) is a raised platform typically built under the shade of a huge tree, common in Andhra Pradesh. The tree may be Ficus benghalensis or Sacred fig or Jambul or Tamarind. The platforms may be built with sedimentary rocks or bricks or cement. Historically Racchabandas came into existence in India before the Medieval period. Rachabandas can also be found in several rural villages throughout India.

== Importance ==
Racchabanda is a traditional get together place for the villagers to discuss their social problems, economic issues, and other disputes. Head of a village who is called munsabu (mostly elder males) sits on racchabanda to give solutions for several problems and settle various disputes among villagers. Racchabandas act as local courts which are always confined to the limits of their respective villages.

== Modern status ==
In modern times, racchabandas are becoming extinct due to urbanization.
