= State Highway 102 (Andhra Pradesh) =

State highway in India

State Highway 102

Major junctions
- North end: Dwarapudi
- South end: Yanam

Location
- Country: India
- States: Andhra Pradesh
- Primary destinations: Dwarapudi, Yanam

Highway system
- Roads in India; Expressways; National; State; Asian

State Highway 102 (Andhra Pradesh) is a state highway in the Indian state of Andhra Pradesh

== Route ==
It starts at SH 40 Junction at Dwarapudi and passes through Tapeswaram, Mandapeta, Draksharama, Yerraporthavaram, Kuyyeru, Kolanka, Injaram, Sunkarapalem and ends at Yanam.

== See also ==
- List of state highways in Andhra Pradesh
