= Komaripalem =

- Village
- Interactive map of Komaripalem
- Location in Andhra Pradesh, India Komaripalem (India)
- Coordinates: 16.9234895°N 82.0040131°E
- Country: India
- State: Andhra Pradesh
- District: East Godavari
- Talukas: Biccavolu
- Elevation: 13 m (43 ft)

Languages
  - Official: Telugu
- Time zone: UTC+5:30 (IST)
- PIN: 533346
- Telephone code: 08857

Komaripalem is a village in Biccavolu mandal of East Godavari district in the state of Andhra Pradesh in India.

== Geography ==
Komaripalem is located in Biccavolu Mandal, East Godavari District. It has an average elevation of 13 meters (42.65 feet).

It is famous for making of firecrackers, especially hand-made rockets, and flower pots.

== History ==
Long ago there was an ancient town named Gowripatnam padu. It was a big town in Rajamahendravaram kingdom. It often suffered from natural disasters like earthquakes and droughts. The people made a number of big ponds to store water. At the last stage of township the people had nothing to eat. They tried to eat even soil to control their hunger. They felt that it was very hard to stay there, and decided to shift from the town. The people went in different directions and made small villages as per their requirements and comfort. Many people who had great affection for the town settled very nearby and made a village. They felt this new village was a son of the old town. As per Hindu stories, Kumaraswamy is the only natural born son of Gowri devi. Therefore, they put the village name as "Kumarapalem". With time passing and different pronunciations the name gradually changed to Komaripalem.

Everywhere one can find a village goddess in or near the village. However, Komaripalem people still give priority to the Gowripatnampadu town goddess Gogulamma, located 5 km from the village. They also offer pujas to the village goddess Dosalamma. One can still find three very small ponds near Gogulamma temple named Enugula Cheruvu, Kanikela Cheruvu, etc. One can also find some big rocks which were used as temple bricks.

== Present ==
Komaripalem is well known for fire crackers, super markets and rice mills. "Sri Mahalakshmi super Bazar" is the biggest super market located at Y-Junction Komaripalem village. There are more than 10 Rice mill industries in and around Komaripalem Village. "Murali Mohana Rice mill" which makes rice bags under famous brand name "Sri Bell" is also Located in komaripalem. R.K. Restaurant was famous for chicken biryani. Naveen’s Sarvana restaurant is now famous in the village.

== Political arena ==
- Total wards: 14
- Total Mptc: 2
- Current President: Vasamsetti Ravi Kumar
- Ex-president: Padala Venkata Rama Reddy S/o Padala Ammi Reddy garu (ex mla)

Ex-vice president: Dwarampudi venkata Reddy S/o Dwarampudi venkata reddy Ex-president: Kovvuri Jyothirmai Sathya Narayana Reddy. D/o- Tadi Aravindam

== Population ==
- Population: 6434
- Male: 3211
- Female: 3223
- Voters: 4500+

== Temples ==
- Dosallama Temple
- Durgamma Temple
- Gowreeswara Swami Temple
- Ramalayam-6
- Subrahmanyeswara Swamy Temple
- Venu Gopala Swami Temple
- Gogulamma Temple

== Banks ==
- HDFC Bank
- Bank of Baroda
- Andhra Pradesh Grameena Bank

== Restaurants ==
- Saravana Family Restaurant
- Kareem Family Restaurant
- Mr Foods

== Mobile Stores ==
- Siva Karthikeya Computers and Mobiles

== Grocery Stores ==
- Mahalakshmi Super Bazar
- Sri Kanaka Durga Super Bazar

== Gyms ==
- Hanuman Gym
