= State Highway 40 (Andhra Pradesh) =

Road in Andhra Pradesh, India

State Highway 40

Major junctions
- West end: Rajahmundry
- East end: Samalkota

Location
- Country: India
- States: Andhra Pradesh
- Primary destinations: Rajahmundry, Dwarapudi, Anaparthy, Biccavolu, Samalkota

Highway system
- Roads in India; Expressways; National; State; Asian

State Highway 40 is a state highway in the Indian state of Andhra Pradesh. It connects Rajamahendravaram, East Godavari district and Samalkota, Kakinada district of the state.

== Route ==
The route starts at Rajamahendravaram and passes through Dwarapudi, Anaparthy, Biccavolu and ends at Samalkota. The highway is being upgraded as it is one of the major roads of the Petroleum, Chemicals and Petrochemicals Investment Region (PCPIR) roads.

== See also ==
- List of state highways in Andhra Pradesh
