= Piduguralla bus station =

Bus station in Piduguralla

General information
- Location: Piduguralla, Palnadu district, Andhra Pradesh; India
- Owner: APSRTC

Construction
- Parking: Yes

Piduguralla bus station is a bus station located in Piduguralla town of the Indian state of Andhra Pradesh. It is owned by Andhra Pradesh State Road Transport Corporation. This is one of the major bus stations in the district, with services to all towns and villages in the district and also to nearby cities in the state.
