= Komarthi =

- Village
- Interactive map of Komarthi
- Location in Andhra Pradesh, India Komarthi (India)
- Coordinates: 18°23′35″N 84°00′46″E
- Country: India
- State: Andhra Pradesh

Government
  - Type: Gram Panchayat

Languages
  - Official: Telugu
- Time zone: UTC+5:30 (IST)
- PIN: 532421
- Vehicle Registration: AP30 (Former); AP39 (from 30 January 2019)

Komarthi is a Panchayat village in Narasannapeta mandal of Srikakulam district in the Indian state of Andhra Pradesh. Postal Index Number of this village is 532421.

National Highway 16 (India) passes through Komarthi village.

== Demography ==
According to 2011 census population of Komarthi Village is 1,844. Komarthi population in 2021 is estimated to be 2,091.

== Transportation ==
Komarthi is Well Connected by APSRTC Buses. Autos and Taxis are available to this Village.

Komarthi Junction is a major junction, where APSRTC Buses, Autos, Taxis are available.

Nearest Towns are Srikakulam, Narasannapeta, Singupuram.
