= State Highway 38 (Andhra Pradesh) =

Road in Andhra Pradesh, India

State Highway 38

Major junctions
- North-East end: Bheemunipatnam
- West end: Devipatnam

Location
- Country: India
- State: Andhra Pradesh
- Primary destinations: Bheemunipatnam, Anakapalle, Narsipatnam, Devipatnam

Highway system
- Roads in India; Expressways; National; State; Asian; State Highways in Andhra Pradesh

State Highway 38 is a state highway in the Indian state of Andhra Pradesh.

== Route ==
It starts at Bheemunipatnam (Vemulavalasa Junction) and passes through Pendurthi (Visakhapatnam), Sabbavaram, Chodavaram, Narsipatnam, Koyyuru, Rajavommangi, Addateegala, Rampachodavaram and ends at Devipatnam.

== See also ==
- List of state highways in Andhra Pradesh
