= State Highway 41 (Andhra Pradesh) =

Road in Andhra Pradesh, India

State Highway 41

Major junctions
- West end: Chintoor
- East end: Rajahmundry

Location
- Country: India
- States: Andhra Pradesh

Highway system
- Roads in India; Expressways; National; State; Asian

State Highway 41 (Andhra Pradesh) is a state highway in the Indian state of Andhra Pradesh

== Route ==
It starts at Junction near Chintoor, Polavaram district and passes through Rampachodavaram, Korukonda, Madhurapudi and ends at Rajahmundry, East Godavari district

== See also ==
- List of state highways in Andhra Pradesh
