= State Highway 50 (Andhra Pradesh) =

Road in Andhra Pradesh, India

State Highway 50

Major junctions
- West end: Karnataka border
- East end: Madanapalle

Location
- Country: India
- States: Andhra Pradesh
- Primary destinations: Madanapalle

Highway system
- Roads in India; Expressways; National; State; Asian

State Highway 50 (Andhra Pradesh) is a state highway in the Indian state of Andhra Pradesh

== Route ==
It starts at Karnataka border and ends at Madanapalle.

== See also ==
- List of state highways in Andhra Pradesh
