= State Highway 30 (Andhra Pradesh) =

Road in Andhra Pradesh, India

State Highway 30

Major junctions
- West end: Anantapur
- East end: Bugga

Location
- Country: India
- State: Andhra Pradesh
- Primary destinations: Anantapur, Tadipatri, Bugga

Highway system
- Roads in India; Expressways; National; State; Asian; State Highways in Andhra Pradesh

State Highway 30 (Andhra Pradesh) is a state highway in Anantapur district of the Indian state of Andhra Pradesh

== Route ==
It starts at Anantapur and passes through Tadipatri, before terminating at Bugga.

=== Junctions and interchanges ===
State Highway 30
Northbound exits	Junction	Southbound exits
---	1	Gorantla
---	2	Pulivendula
Rayalacheruvu	3	Kadiri
---	4	Kadapa
---	5	Jammalamadugu

== See also ==
- List of state highways in Andhra Pradesh
