= Mypadu Beach =

Beach in Andhra Pradesh, India

- Beach
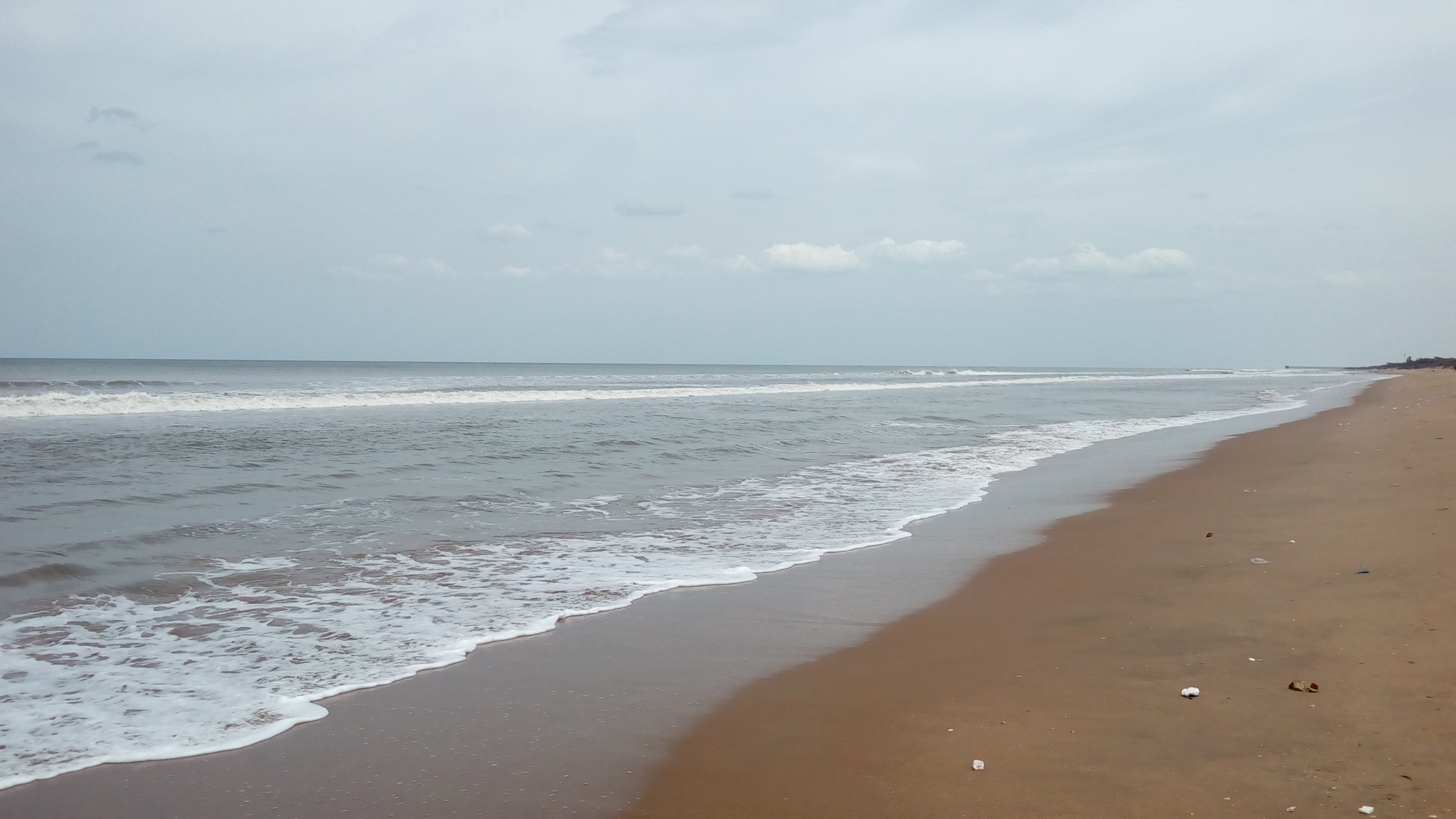
- Bay of Bengal at Mypadu Beach

- Location within Andhra Pradesh
- Coordinates: 14.5068°N 80.1788°E
- Location: Mypadu, Nellore SPSR Nellore district, Andhra Pradesh, India
- Water bodies: Bay of Bengal

Mypadu Beach is located on the East coast of Bay of Bengal, at a distance of 20 km (12 mi) from Nellore SPSR Nellore district in Andhra Pradesh. The beach is maintained by the state tourism board, APTDC. The beach provides fishing opportunities for the local fishermen, and access to cruises for the tourists. The Andhra Pradesh Tourism Development Corporation (APTDC), is taking certain measures to promote Mypadu Beach as a tourist destination by setting up recreational activities such as water sports and development of resorts.

== See also ==
- List of beaches in India
