= Singupuram =

- Town
- Location in Andhra Pradesh, India Singupuram (India)
- Coordinates: 18.357436°N 83.971820°E
- Country: India
- State: Andhra Pradesh
- District: Srikakulam

Area
  - Total: 20 km^{2} (7.7 sq mi)
- Elevation: 22 m (72 ft)

Population
  - Total: 12,273
  - Density: 610/km^{2} (1,600/sq mi)

Languages
  - Official: Telugu
- Time zone: UTC+5:30 (IST)
- PIN: 532185
- Vehicle Registration: AP30 (Former) AP39 (from 30 January 2019)
- Lok Sabha constituency: Srikakulam (Lok Sabha constituency)
- Vidhan Sabha constituency: Srikakulam (Assembly constituency)

Singupuram is a census town in the Indian state of Andhra Pradesh.

== Geography ==
It is located 11 kilometers(km) east of the district headquarters of Srikakulam district, 9 km from Srikakulam and 100 km from Visakhapatnam.

== Demographics ==
According to the 2011 census of India, Singupuram had a population of 12,273 with 2,774 households.

== Healthcare ==
A Primary Health Centre (PHC) is located there along with four to five private hospitals.

== Transport ==
National Highway 16 bypasses the town and is a part of the Golden Quadrilateral highway network. Srikakulam is the nearest city to Singupuram, approximately 7 km southwest of Singupuram. Road connectivity is also present from Srikakulam to Singupuram.

SH37 connects Singupuram town with Parvathipuram, Veeraghattam, Palakonda, Kalingapatnam.

== Education ==
=== Colleges ===
- Gurajada Education
- Vaishnavi engineering college
- SISTAM engineering college

=== Schools ===
- ZPHS
- M.P.P School
- Kgvb Srikakulam
- Sarada Vidyaniketan
- Kv singupuram
- Shiva Sivani Public School
- Vidatri vidyalayam
- Keshava Reddy School
- Gayatri school
- Kendriya Vidyalayam

== Politics ==
Two days before polling in the 2004 elections, Kinjarapu Yerran Naidu survived an assassination attempt by Naxalites (Maoists) who attempted to bomb his vehicle in Singupuram. Following his re-election, he was made the party leader in the Lok Sabha.
