= State Highway 34 (Andhra Pradesh) =

Road in Andhra Pradesh, India

State Highway 34

Major junctions
- West-Terminal end: Kadiri
- East-Terminal end: Rajampet

Location
- Country: India
- State: Andhra Pradesh

Highway system
- Roads in India; Expressways; National; State; Asian; State Highways in Andhra Pradesh

State Highway 34 is a state highway in the Indian state of Andhra Pradesh

== Route ==
It starts at Kadiri of Sri Sathya Sai district and passes through Rayachoti and ends at Rajampet of Kadapa district.

== See also ==
- List of state highways in Andhra Pradesh
