= State Highway 89 (Andhra Pradesh) =

Road in Andhra Pradesh, India

State Highway 89

Major junctions
- North end: Macherla
- South end: Vinukonda

Location
- Country: India
- States: Andhra Pradesh
- Primary destinations: Macherla, Vinukonda

Highway system
- Roads in India; Expressways; National; State; Asian

State Highway 89 (Andhra Pradesh) is a state highway in the Indian state of Andhra Pradesh

== Route ==
It starts at Macherla and passes through Durgi, Karempudi, Ipur and ends at Vinukonda.

== See also ==
- List of state highways in Andhra Pradesh
