= Kodi Rammurthy Naidu =

Indian bodybuilder, strongman, and wrestler (1883–1942)

Kodi Rama Murti Naidu
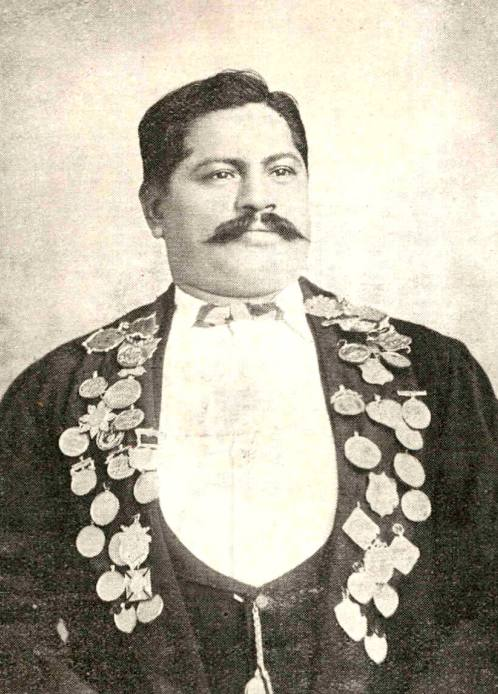
- Born: Kodi Ramamurthy Naidu; 3 November 1883 or April 1882; Veeraghattam, Srikakulam district, Andhra Pradesh, India
- Died: January 1942 (aged 58 or 59); Balangir, Orissa, India
- Height: 5 ft 6.5 in (169 cm)

Kodi Rammurthy Naidu (also known as Rama Murti Naidu and Prof. Rammurty) was an Indian strongman, bodybuilder, and wrestler, celebrated for his exceptional strength and contributions to India's physical culture history. He was renowned for his extraordinary feats, such as stopping two cars using only his muscle power and withstanding the weight of an elephant on his chest. He was awarded the title of "Indian Hercules" by King George V. He is also known by the epithets "Kaliyuga Bhima" (transl. Bhima of Kaliyuga), "Indian Sandow", "Malla Marthanda" (lit. 'The Sun of Malla-yuddha').

Rammurty Naidu worked as a Physical Education instructor. He was a strict vegetarian. He was an expert in Vayu Stambhana (air resistance) and Jala Stambhana (water resistance) yoga. In addition to his athletic pursuits, he founded a successful circus company but generously donated his earnings to charitable trusts and the Indian independence movement.

== Early life ==
Kodi Rammurty Naidu was born in a Telugu family to Kodi Venkanna Naidu in the village of Veeraghattam in Srikakulam district, Madras Presidency. The Hindu notes his birth date as April 1882, while BBC News Telugu and Sakshi mention it as 3 November 1883.

Rammurthy Naidu's mother died when he was a child. Since the boy had become motherless, his father, Venkanna, treated him with care and affection in his childhood. Rammurthy had no inclination towards studies, which earned him the wrath of his father. Fleeing home Ramamurthy reached the forests. He returned to the town after a week along with a tiger cub.

Growing up, Rammurthy used to quarrel with his friends over trivial issues. Vexed with his behaviour, his father, Venkanna sent him to his brother Kodi Narayana Swamy's house in Vizianagaram for higher studies. Narayana Swamy was serving there as a police inspector. Rammurthy joined a fitness centre in Vizianagaram and learnt Kusthi, and soon became an established pehelwan (wrestler) in the region.

== Career ==
=== Physical Education instructor ===
After his schooling Rammurthy was appointed as a drill master in his own school and continued training in his free time. In 1901, he joined a college in Saidapet, Madras that trains teachers in Physical Education. In 1911 he displayed his skills of breaking steel chains, stopping motor cars and allowing elephant to pass over his chest before government authorities in Madras.

=== Circus company ===
Rammurthy Naidu established a circus company in Vizianagaram with the help of his friend, Potti Panthulu. His uncommon feats attracted people from all over the country. He used to break an iron chain tied to his body by taking a deep breath and flexing his muscles. Iron chains would be tied to his shoulders and the other ends were tied to two cars and used to stop them. He took an elephant on his chest and held it for five minutes.

=== Performances abroad ===
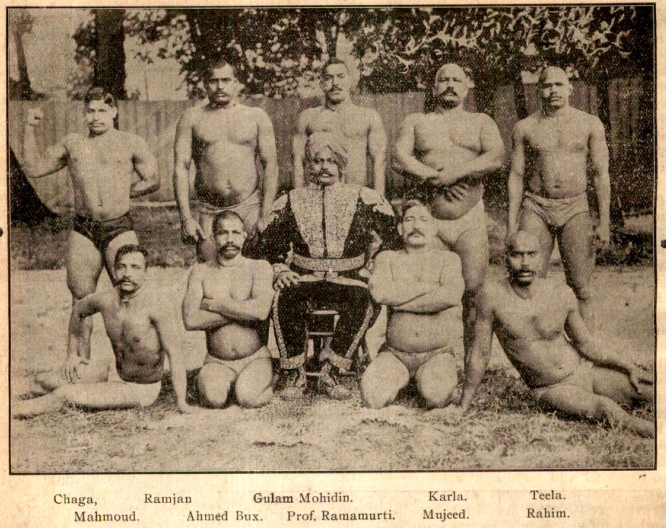
Ramamurthi (seated in the centre) and other wrestlers, c. 1912

Lord Minto, the Viceroy of British India, experienced Ramamurthy's strength, when he tried to drive his car with Rammurthy holding it back with iron chains. His fame spread across the length and breadth of the country after this incident.

Naidu demonstrated his skills at the Indian National Congress meeting in Allahabad. Pandit Madan Mohan Malaviya encouraged him to perform his feats abroad and sent his team to London. Soon, Ramamurthy began travelling extensively throughout the subcontinent. Naidu performed impressive feats like stopping two cars (driving in two different directions) of 12 horse power at high acceleration, breaking iron chains (of half inches) and balancing an elephant on his chest.

King George and Queen Mary were impressed with his feats and gave him the title Indian Hercules after watching his display of physical strength at Buckingham Palace. He was the first Indian to be so honoured by the royal couple. It was said that his portrait adorned the walls of the Buckingham Palace after that. Soon, Ramamurthy came to be known as "Kaliyuga Bheema" and "Indian Eugene Sandow".

He became a regular in France, Germany and Spain. When he was in Spain, the local people invited him to fight a bull in the ring. He entered the bullfighting ring, took the bull by its horns and threw it to the ground . Although he had no experience of bull-fights, he dared and performed it successfully.

=== Charity and freedom movement ===
Ramamurthy Naidu was attracted towards the freedom movement through D. Chandrayya Naidu, who used to organise tribal youths against the British rulers. He earned crores of rupees through his circus company but spent a large amount of his wealth on charity and for the freedom movement of India.

=== Death ===
In his last days, Naidu shifted to the estate of his friend, the ruler of Balangir princely state in Orissa. He died there in Balangir during the Sankranti festival in 1942 due to an accident.

== Legacy ==
Anirban Ghosh notes of Ramamurthy Naidu trained and inspired youth to be physically fit countering the colonial stereotype that the Indian man was weaker than the British. Abhijit Gupta of Jadavpur University calls Naidu, "perhaps the most well-known and widely travelled among the league of extraordinary gentleman."

A statue of Ramamurthy Naidu was installed on the Beach Road of Visakhapatnam. Another statue is also situated in his home town, Veeraghattam. Kodi Rammurthy Stadium in Srikakulam has been named after him. There were reports of various Telugu filmmakers' interest in making a biographical film on the life of Naidu.

== Gallery ==
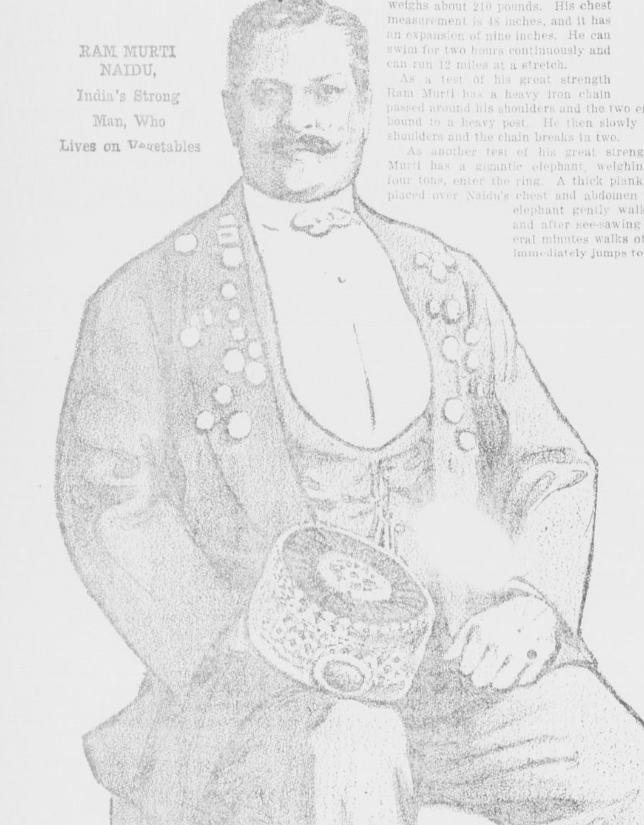
Illustration of Naidu in The Daily Ardmoreite (22 January 1918)

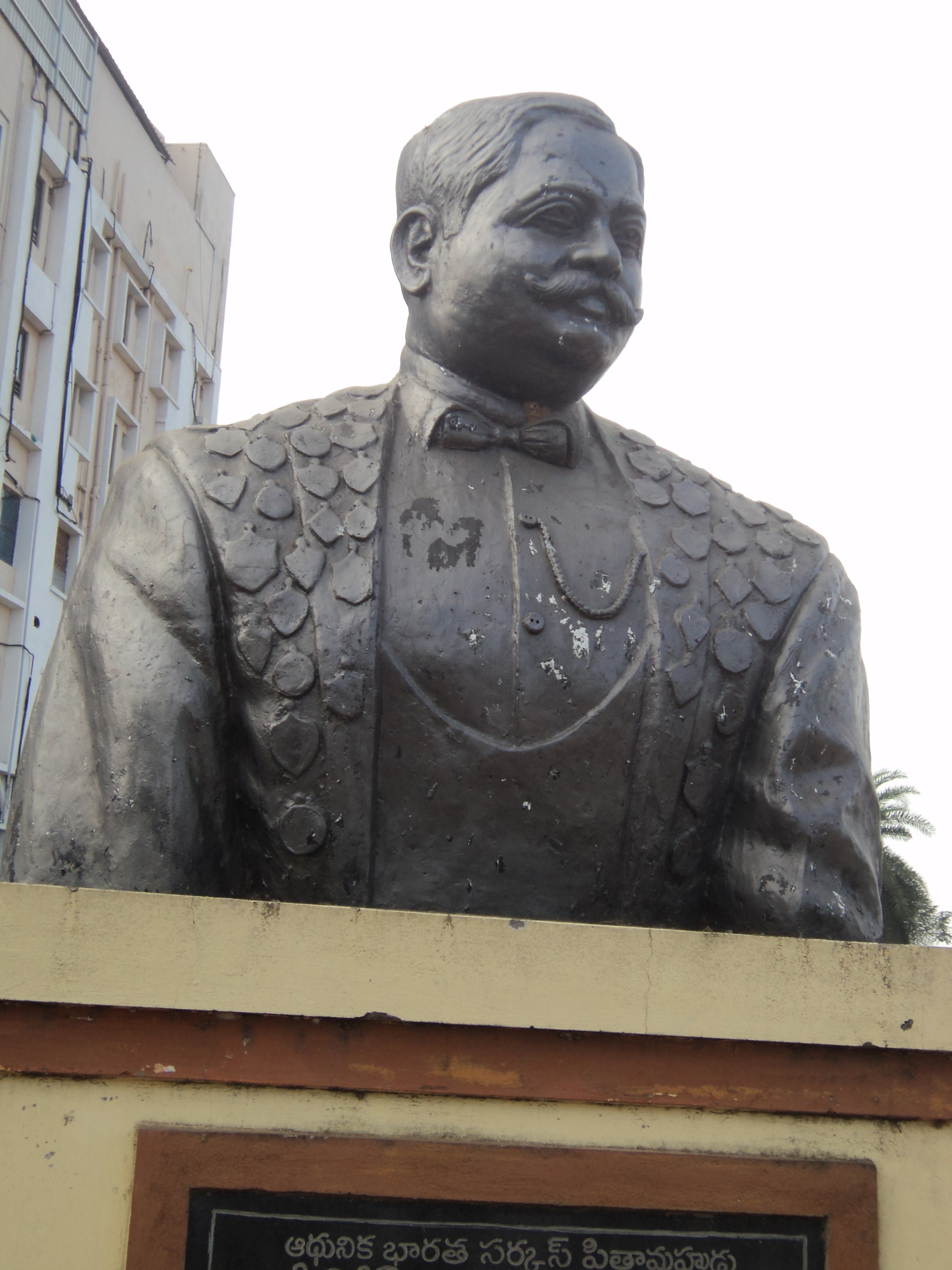
Bust of Ramamurthy Naidu in Srikakulam

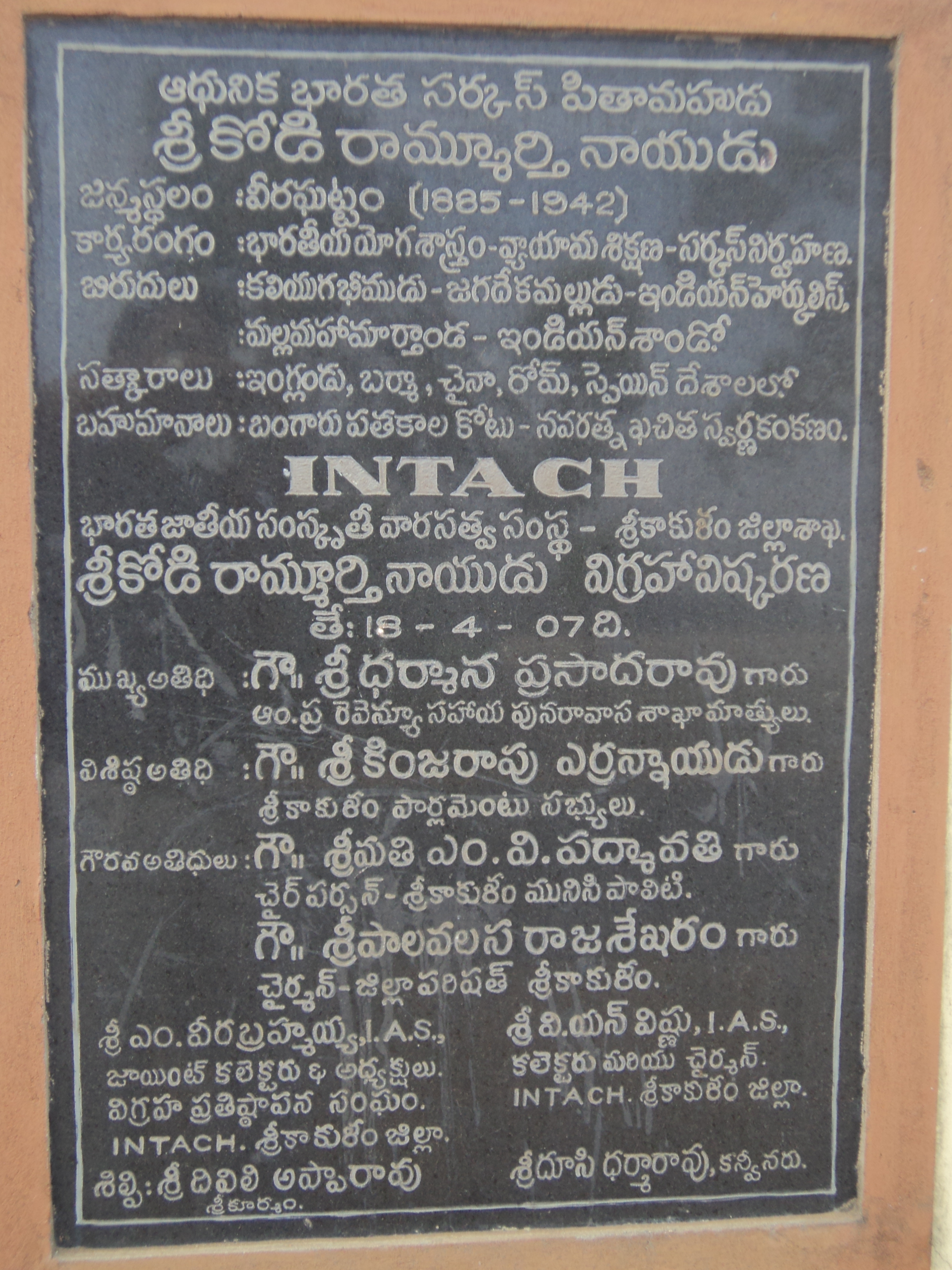
Information plate of the statue in Srikakulam
