= State Highway 2 (Andhra Pradesh) =

Road in Andhra Pradesh, India

State Highway 2

Major junctions
- West end: Macherla
- East end: Guntur

Location
- Country: India
- State: Andhra Pradesh
- Primary destinations: Macherla, Piduguralla, Sattenapalle, Guntur

Highway system
- Roads in India; Expressways; National; State; Asian; State Highways in Andhra Pradesh

State Highway 2 is a state highway in the Indian state of Andhra Pradesh. It starts at Macherla in the west and ends at Guntur in the east end of the Guntur district.

== History ==
Prior to the bifurcation of the state of Andhra Pradesh, the designation SH-2 was used for state highway that passed through NAM Expressway National Highway.

== Route ==
The major destinations in route are Macherla, Gurazala, Dachepalle, Piduguralla Sattenapalle and the terminal destination of Guntur.

== See also ==
- List of state highways in Andhra Pradesh
