= State Highway 37 (Andhra Pradesh) =

Road in Andhra Pradesh, India

State Highway 37

Major junctions
- North-West end: Parvathipuram
- South-East end: Kalingapatnam

Location
- Country: India
- State: Andhra Pradesh
- Primary destinations: Parvathipuram, Veeraghattam, Palakonda, Singupuram, Srikakulam, Kalingapatnam

Highway system
- Roads in India; Expressways; National; State; Asian; State Highways in Andhra Pradesh

State Highway 37 is a state highway in the Indian state of Andhra Pradesh.

== Route ==
It starts at Parvathipuram and passes through Veeraghattam, Palakonda, Singupuram and ends at Kalingapatnam.

== Junctions and interchanges ==
State Highway 37,
Northbound exits	Junction	Southbound exits
---	1	Razam
Totapalli Reservoir Road	2	Vizianagaram
Jiyyammavalasa	3	---
Razam	4	---
---	5	Kotturu
Sarubujjili	6	---
Singupuram	7	---
NH-16	8	NH-16
Amudalavalasa	9	---

== See also ==
- List of state highways in Andhra Pradesh
