= Indukurupeta mandal =

Indukurpeta
- Mandal
- Interactive map of Indukurpeta
- Location in Andhra Pradesh, India Indukurpeta (India)
- Coordinates: 14.4500°N 80.1333°E
- Country: India
- State: Andhra Pradesh
- District: Nellore
- Elevation: 4 m (13 ft)

Languages
  - Official: Telugu
- Time zone: UTC+5:30 (IST)
- Postal code: 524314
- Vehicle registration: AP

Indukurupeta mandal is a mandal in Nellore district in the state of Andhra Pradesh in India. It is located in Kovur (Assembly constituency).

== Geography ==
Indukurupeta is located at 14.4500°N 80.1333°E. It has an average elevation of 4 meters (16 feet). Indukurupeta is located approximately 15km east from district headquarters Nellore. Area of the mandal is 144sq.Km approximately.

== Climate and soil ==
The climate of Indukurupeta is hot and humid in summer and cold in rainy and winter seasons. Summer temperatures range from 25 °C (77 °F) to 45 °C (113 °F). Soils are black cotton and sandy loams. Annually the mandal receives approximately 1,143 millimetres (45.0 in) of rainfall, including 220 millimetres (8.7 in) in the months of August and September.

== Panchayats ==
Indukurupeta comprises 20 panchayats:

1. Devispeta
2. Gangapatnam
3. Indukurpet Bit-II (Kothuru)
4. Indukurpet Bit-I
5. Jangamvanidoruvu
6. Komarika
7. Koruturu
8. Kothuru-Chinthopu
9. Kudithipalem
10. Leburu Bit-I
11. Leburu Bit-II
12. Mudivarthipalem
13. Mypadu
14. Narasapuram
15. Nidimusali
16. Pallipadu
17. Punnur
18. Ramudupalem
19. Ravur
20. Somarajupalli

The mandal revenue office is situated in Kothuru. There are 16 major villages, 64 hamlets and 16,687 households in the mandal. There is rural police station, 30 bed primary health care center, veterinary hospital in mandal headquarters Indukurupeta.

== Population ==
As per 2011 census total population of this mandal is 58543 out of which 29,075 being male and 29468 female. Sex ratio is 1014(females per 1000 males), while sex ratio between 0-6 years age is 937(females per male). Literacy rate is 65.4%. (Male-71.1% and Female-59.7%).

== Economy ==
Most of the people rely on farming, cattle and sheep rearing, agriculture, building & daily labor, street vendors and priests. Since rice and other crops grow abundantly, there are many rice and dal mills in the mandal. Also many marine export companies are present, as there are many fish and prawn ponds in the mandal. Marine products are mainly exported Chennai and thereby to other international destinations.

== Tourism ==
Many famous temples are located in and around Indukurupeta mandal, including Gangapatnam Chamundeswari Ammavaru, Leburu Kunkalamma, Kothuru Saibaba, Lalithamaheswari Ashramam, and Mypadu Shivalayam. Mypadu Beach is also located in this mandal. The mandal hosts several movie theaters and recreational clubs.

== Transport ==
The nearest railway station is in Nellore. APSRTC buses are available from Atmakur bus station in Nellore. Many autos and private vehicles are also available. The nearest airports are in Kadapa, Chennai and Vijayawada.
