= Mypadu =

- village
- Interactive map of Mypadu
- Location in Andhra Pradesh, India
- Coordinates: 14.5049°N 80.1694°E
- Country: India
- State: Andhra Pradesh
- District: Nellore
- Mandal: Indukurpeta
- Elevation: 14 m (46 ft)

Languages
  - Official: Telugu
- Time zone: UTC+5:30 (IST)
- Vehicle registration: AP

Mypadu is a village in Indukurupeta Mandal of Nellore district in the state of Andhra Pradesh, India. This is located at 25 Kilometers from Nellore City. The beach here is a tourism spot and many people visit this during holidays and weekends

== Geography ==
Maipadu's geographical coordinates are 14° 30' 0" North, 80° 10' 0" East and its original name (with diacritics) is Maipādu

== See also ==
- Mypadu Beach
