= State Highway 42 (Andhra Pradesh) =

Road in Andhra Pradesh, India

State Highway 42

Major junctions
- West end: Jangareddygudem
- East end: Palakollu

Location
- Country: India
- States: Andhra Pradesh

Highway system
- Roads in India; Expressways; National; State; Asian

State Highway 42 (Andhra Pradesh) is a state highway in the Indian state of Andhra Pradesh.

== Route ==
It starts at border of Telangana at Aswaraopeta and passes through Jangareddygudem, Koyyalagudem, Tadepalligudem, Pippara and ends at Palakollu.

== See also ==
- List of state highways in Andhra Pradesh
