= Kesavaram =

Keshavaram
- Village
- Location in ANDHRA PRADESH, India
- Country: India
- State: Andhra Pradesh

Languages
  - Official: Telugu
- Time zone: UTC+5:30 (IST)
- PIN: 534186
- Telephone code: 08816
- Vehicle registration: AP-37 X XXXX
- Sex ratio: 1:1(approx) ♂/♀

Kesavaram is a village in West Godavari district in Andhra Pradesh, India. It falls under Ganapavaram mandal.

As of 2011 census, the mandal had a population of 64,963 with 18,622 households. The total population constitute, 32,519 males and 32,444 females —a sex ratio of 997 females per 1000 males. 5,894 children are in the age group of 0–6 years, of which 2,957 are boys and 2,937 are girls. The literacy rate stands at 68.35% with 44,406 literates.[1]. Kesavaram - KSVM has a railway station connecting major cities.
