= Tangellamudi =

- Census Town
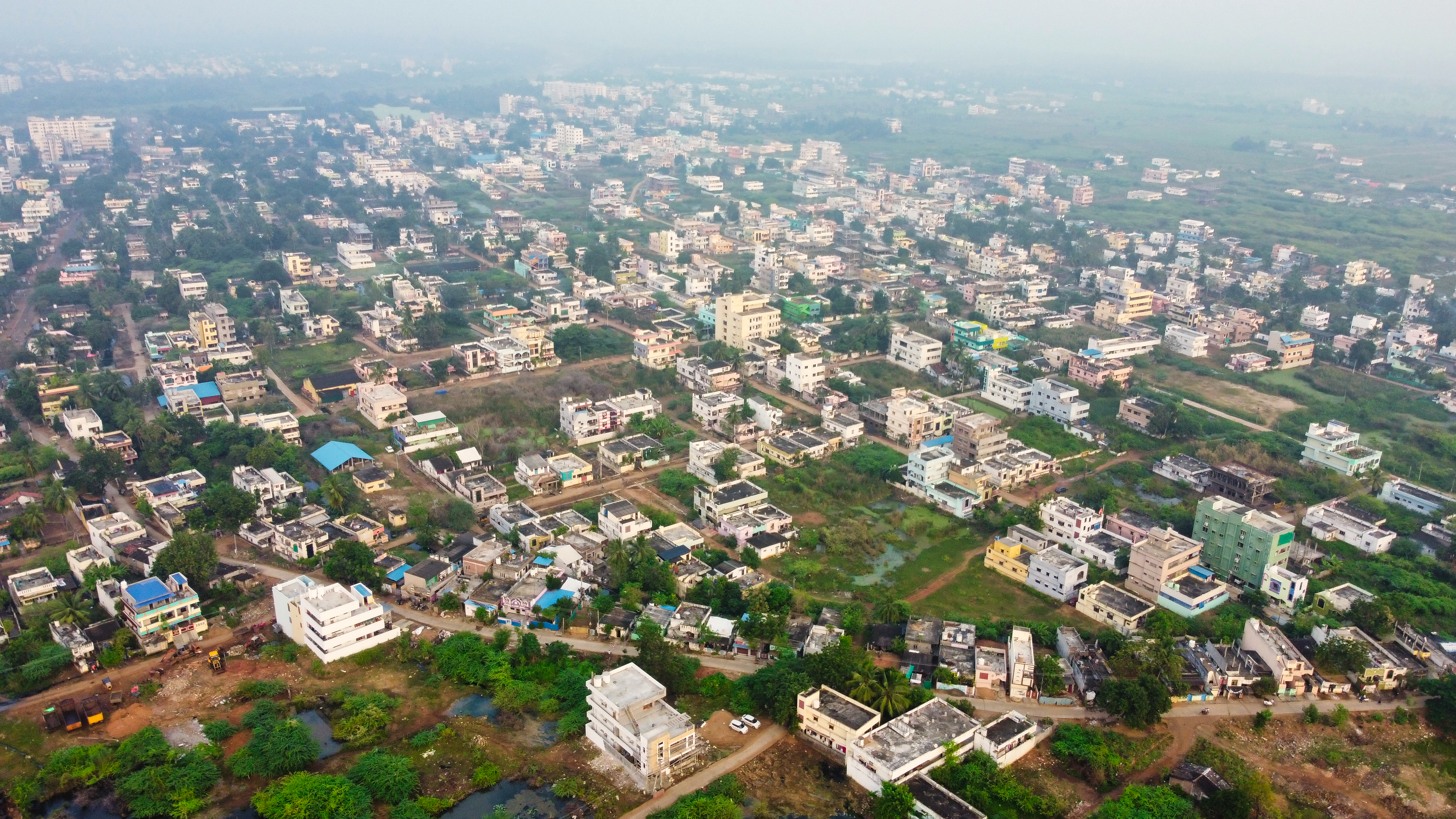
- Western Tangellamudi

- Location in Andhra Pradesh, India
- Coordinates: 16.720662°N 81.108499°E
- Country: India
- State: Andhra Pradesh
- District: Eluru

Government
  - Body: Census Town

Area
  - Total: 4.80 km^{2} (1.85 sq mi)

Population (2011)
  - Total: 8,250
  - Density: 1,720/km^{2} (4,450/sq mi)

Languages
  - Official: Telugu
- Time zone: UTC+5:30 (IST)
- PIN: 534 005
- Vehicle registration: AP

Tangellamudi, also known as Tungala Moody is a census town in Eluru district of the Indian state of Andhra Pradesh. It is in Eluru mandal of Eluru revenue division. The town is a constituent of Eluru urban agglomeration. The nearest railway station is in Powerpet and is 1.5 km.

== Demographics ==
As of 2011 Census of India, Tangellamudi had a population of 8,250. The total population constitute, 4,082 males and 4,168 females —a sex ratio of 1,021 females per 1,000 males. 803 children are in the age group of 0–6 years with child sex ratio of 929 girls per 1,000 boys. The average literacy rate stands at 79.80% with 6,584 literates.

== Education ==
The town plays a major role in education for the rural students of the nearby villages. The primary and secondary school education is imparted by government, aided and private schools, under the School Education Department of the state. As per the school information report for the academic year 2015–16, the town limits have more than 1,055 students enrolled in 4 schools.
