= Jonnada =

- village
- Interactive map of Jonnada
- Location in Andhra Pradesh, India Jonnada (India)
- Coordinates: 16.7833°N 81.9000°E
- Country: India
- State: Andhra Pradesh
- District: Konaseema

Population (2011)
  - Total: 9,000
  - Rank: 4th in Mandal

Languages
  - Official: Telugu
- Time zone: UTC+5:30 (IST)
- PIN: 533233
- Telephone code: 918855
- Nearest city: Rajahmundry
- Literacy: 60%
- Lok Sabha constituency: Amalapuram
- Vidhan Sabha constituency: Kothapeta
- Climate: Humid (Köppen)
- Website: https://prajapedia.com/

Jonnada is an Indian village in Alamuru mandal of Konaseema district, Andhra Pradesh. The village is on the bank of River Godavari (Gautami). National Highway 16 passes through it.
