= Bobbarlanka, East Godavari district =

Bobbarlanka
- Village
- Interactive map of Bobbarlanka
- Location in Andhra Pradesh, India Bobbarlanka (India)
- Coordinates: 16°56′N 81°45′E
- Country: India
- State: Andhra Pradesh
- District: East Godavari
- Mandal: Atreyapuram

Languages
  - Official: Telugu
- Time zone: UTC+5:30 (IST)
- PIN: 533235

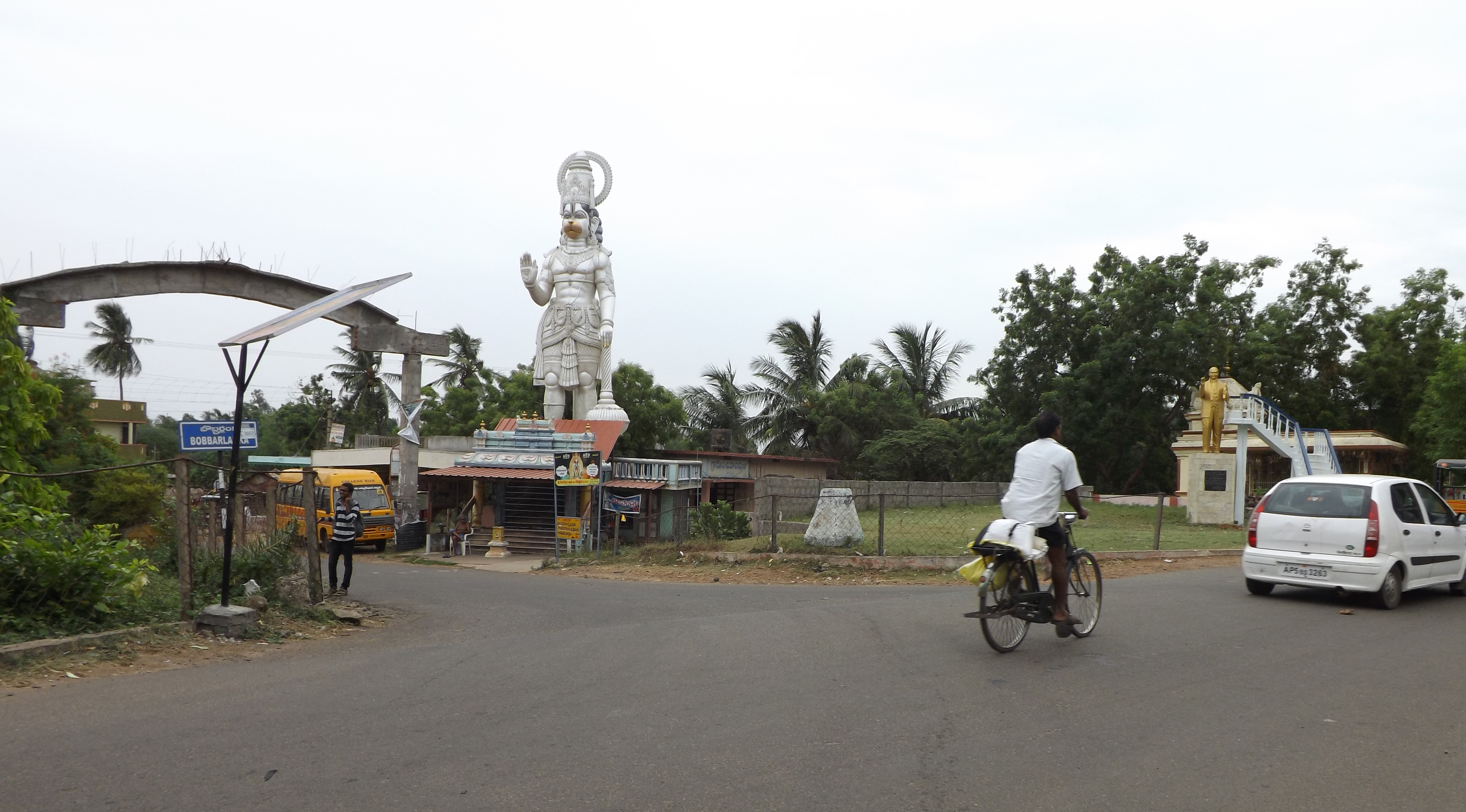
Bobbarlanka Village Main road, W.G.district, Andhra Pradesh

Bobbarlanka is a village in Atreyapuram mandal, located in East Godavari district of the Indian state of Andhra Pradesh.
