= Pippara =

Village in West Godavari dist. Andhra Pradesh, India

- Village
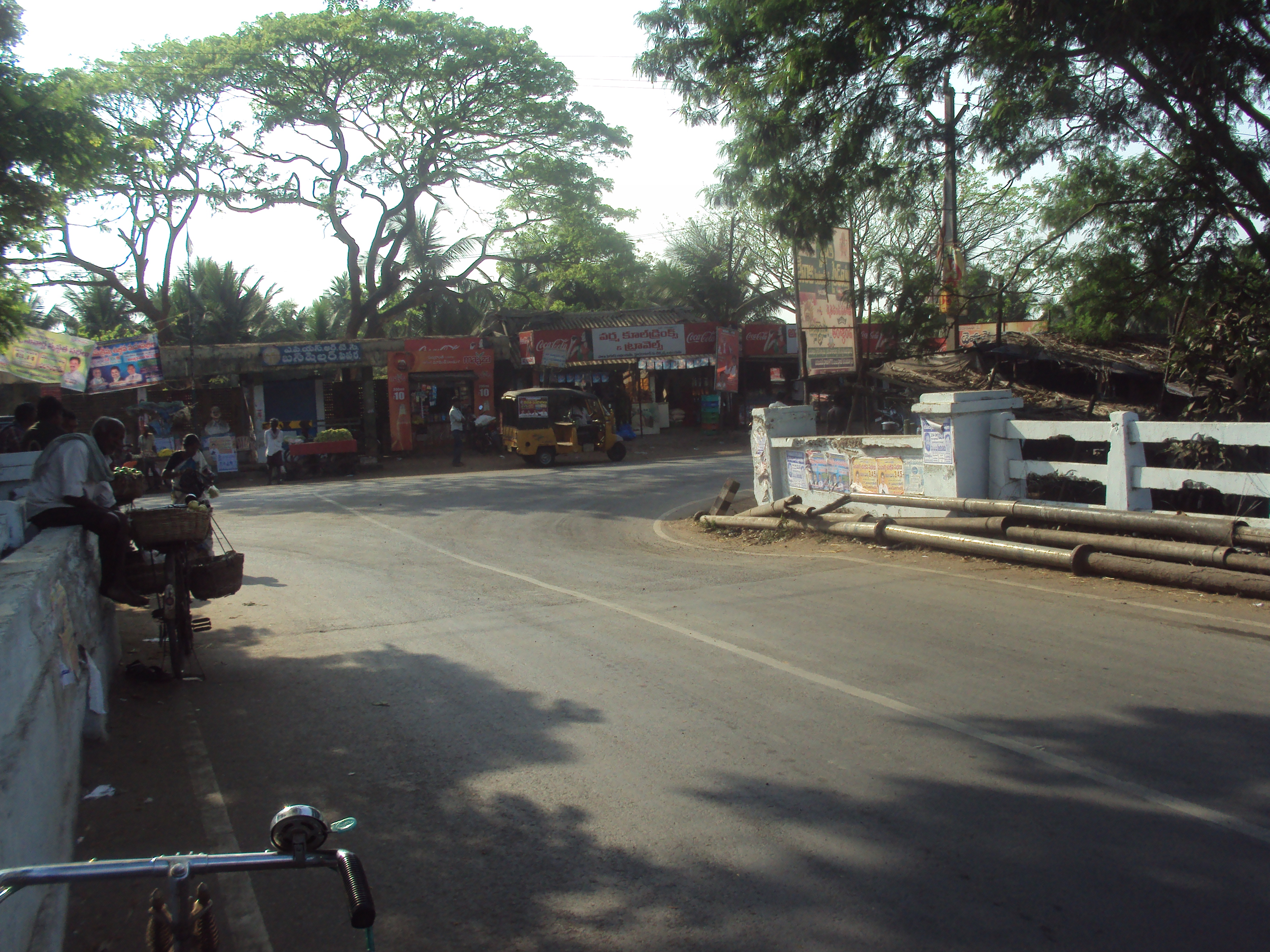
- Main road in pippara
- Interactive map of Pippara
- Location in Andhra Pradesh, India Pippara (India)
- Coordinates: 16°42′46″N 81°32′47″E
- Country: India
- State: Andhra Pradesh
- District: West Godavari
- Talukas: Ganapavaram

Population (2011)
  - Total: 7,719

Languages
  - Official: Telugu
- Time zone: UTC+5:30 (IST)
- PIN: 534197

Pippara is a village and major panchayat in West Godavari district of the Indian state of Andhra Pradesh. It is located in Ganapavaram mandal.

== Demographics ==
As of 2011 census, Pippara had a population of 7,719. The total population constituted 3,835 males and 3,884 females — a ratio of 1013 females per 1000 males. 731 children were in the age group of 0–6 years, of which 354 were boys and 377 were girls. The average literacy rate stands at 75.06%.
