= Vijayarai =

- Village
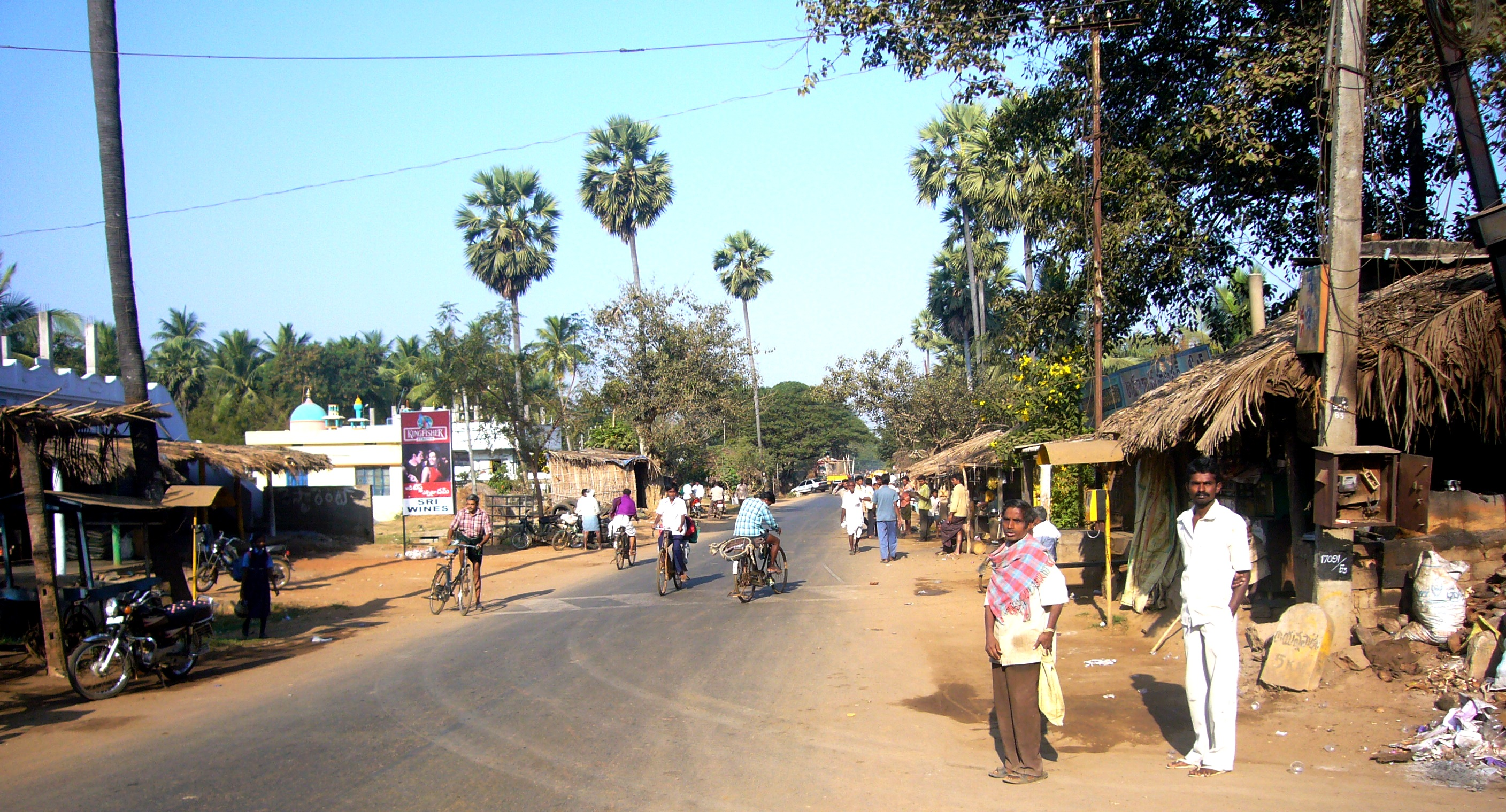
- Street view of Vijayarayi village
- Interactive map of Vijayarai
- Location in Andhra Pradesh, India Vijayarai (India)
- Coordinates: 16.8121°N 81.0327°E
- Country: India
- State: Andhra Pradesh
- District: Eluru
- Mandal: Pedavegi mandal

Area
  - Total: 1.62 km^{2} (0.63 sq mi)
- Elevation: 16 m (52 ft)

Population (2011)
  - Total: 4,038
  - Density: 2,490/km^{2} (6,460/sq mi)

Languages
  - Official: Telugu
- Time zone: UTC+05:30 (IST)
- Postal code: 534 475

Vijayarai is a village in Eluru district of the Indian state of Andhra Pradesh. It is located in Pedavegi mandal of Eluru revenue division. It is located at a distance of 15 km from district headquarters Eluru city.

== Demographics ==
As of 2011 Census of India, Vijayarai had a population of 4038. The total population constitute, 2011 males and 2027 females a sex ratio of 1008 females per 1000 males. 388 children are in the age group of 0–6 years, with child sex ratio of 1031 girls per 1000 boys. The average literacy rate stands at 77.70% with literates.
