= Devipatnam =

- Village
- Interactive map of Devipatnam
- Location in Andhra Pradesh, India Devipatnam (India)
- Coordinates: 17°21′59″N 81°40′39″E
- Country: India
- State: Andhra Pradesh
- District: Polavaram

Population (2011)
  - Total: 1,726

Languages
  - Official: Telugu
- Time zone: UTC+5:30 (IST)
- PIN: 533339
- Vehicle Registration: AP05 (Former); AP39 (from 30 January 2019)

Devipatnam is a village in Devipatnam Mandal, located in Polavaram district of the Indian state of Andhra Pradesh.
