= Sattenapalle =

- Town
- Location in Andhra Pradesh, India
- Coordinates: 16.396167°N 80.149677°E
- Country: India
- State: Andhra Pradesh
- District: Palnadu

Area
  - Total: 21.88 km^{2} (8.45 sq mi)
- Elevation: 71 m (233 ft)

Population (2011)
  - Total: 56,721
  - Density: 2,592/km^{2} (6,714/sq mi)

Languages
  - Official: Telugu
- Time zone: UTC+5:30 (IST)
- Postal code: 522403
- Vehicle registration: AP 39
- Website: sattenapalle.cdma.ap.gov.in/en

Sattenapalle is a town in Palnadu district of the Indian state of Andhra Pradesh. It is a municipality and the headquarters of Sattenapalle mandal under Sattenapalle revenue division. It is also part of APCRDA region.

== History ==
The region is an important area of ancient Kammanadu. This region is also part of the Palnadu region. In 2019, a commanding monument consisting of a 40-ft pedestal and a 36-ft bronze statue of the late Chief Minister of Andhra Pradesh and founder of the Telugu Desam Party, N. T. Rama Rao, was erected in the town surrounded by a large pond.

== Demographics ==
As of 2011 Census of India, Sattenapalle had a population of 56,721. The total population constitute, 28,350 males and 28,371 females —a sex ratio of 1001 females per 1000 males. 5,827 children are in the age group of 0–6 years, of which 3,046 are boys and 2,781 are girls —a ratio of 913 per 1000. The average literacy rate stands at 73.58% with 37,449 literates, significantly higher than the state average of 67.41%.

== Civic administration ==
On 1 April 1984, the municipality was formed as 3rd grade which is now a second grade municipality. The municipality constitutes 30 election and 11 revenue wards. The civic services and infrastructure of the municipality include, supply of 135 litres of per capita water supply, 49 public taps, 415 bore–wells etc. Maintaining 148 km of roads, 136 km of drains etc.

== Economy ==
Sattenapalle is a part of Guntur–Sattenapalle growth corridor.

== Transport ==
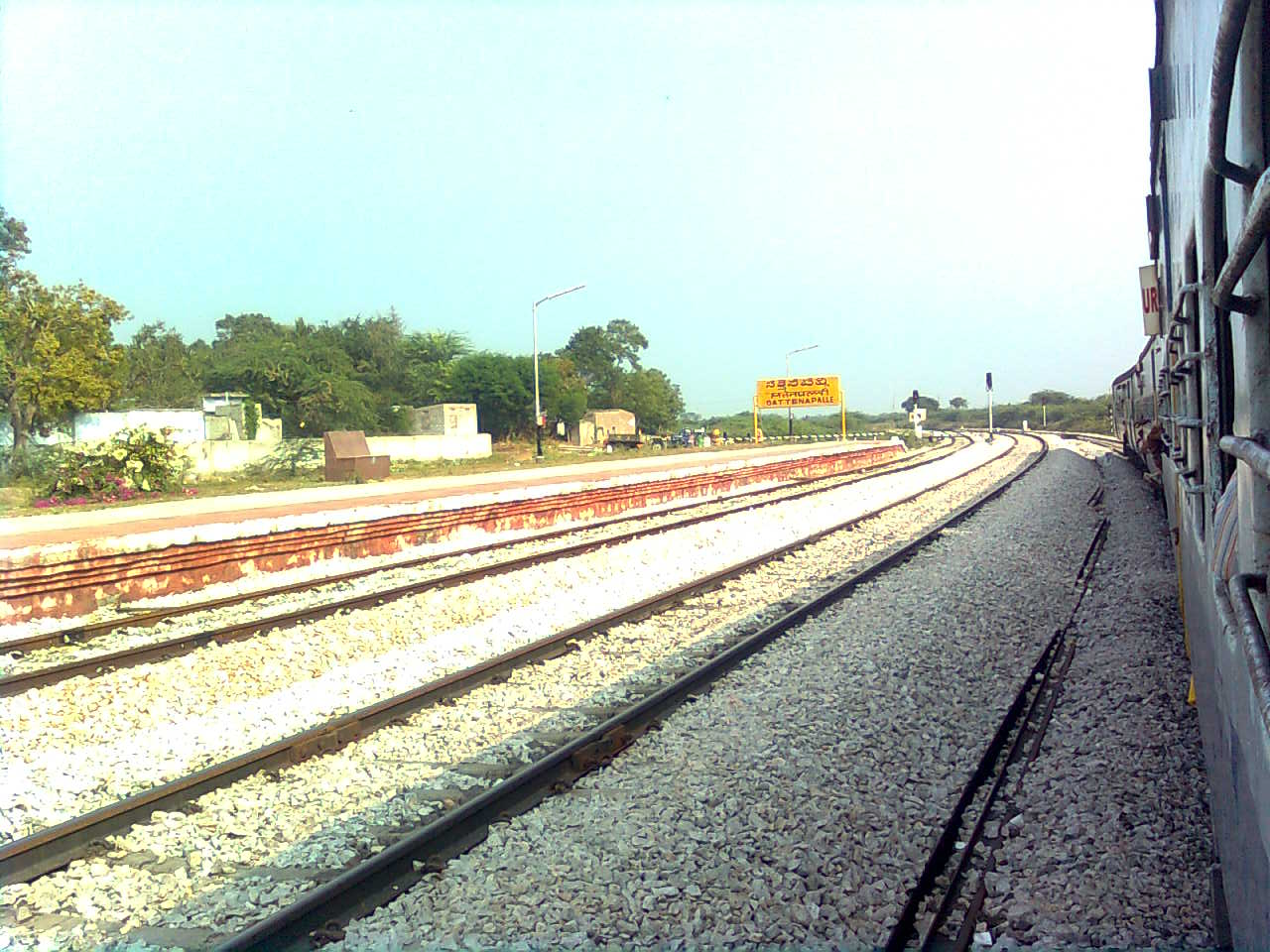
Sattenapalli railway station

The town has a total road length of 110.60 km (68.72 mi). APSRTC operates buses from Sattenapalle bus station to most of the cities and towns in the district like Palnadu district, Macherla, Amaravati, Narasaraopet, Piduguralla etc. NH 167AG passes through the town. Sattenapalle railway station is located on Pagidipalli–Nallapadu section of Guntur railway division.

== See also ==
- Villages in Sattenapalle mandal
