= Biccavolu =

- village
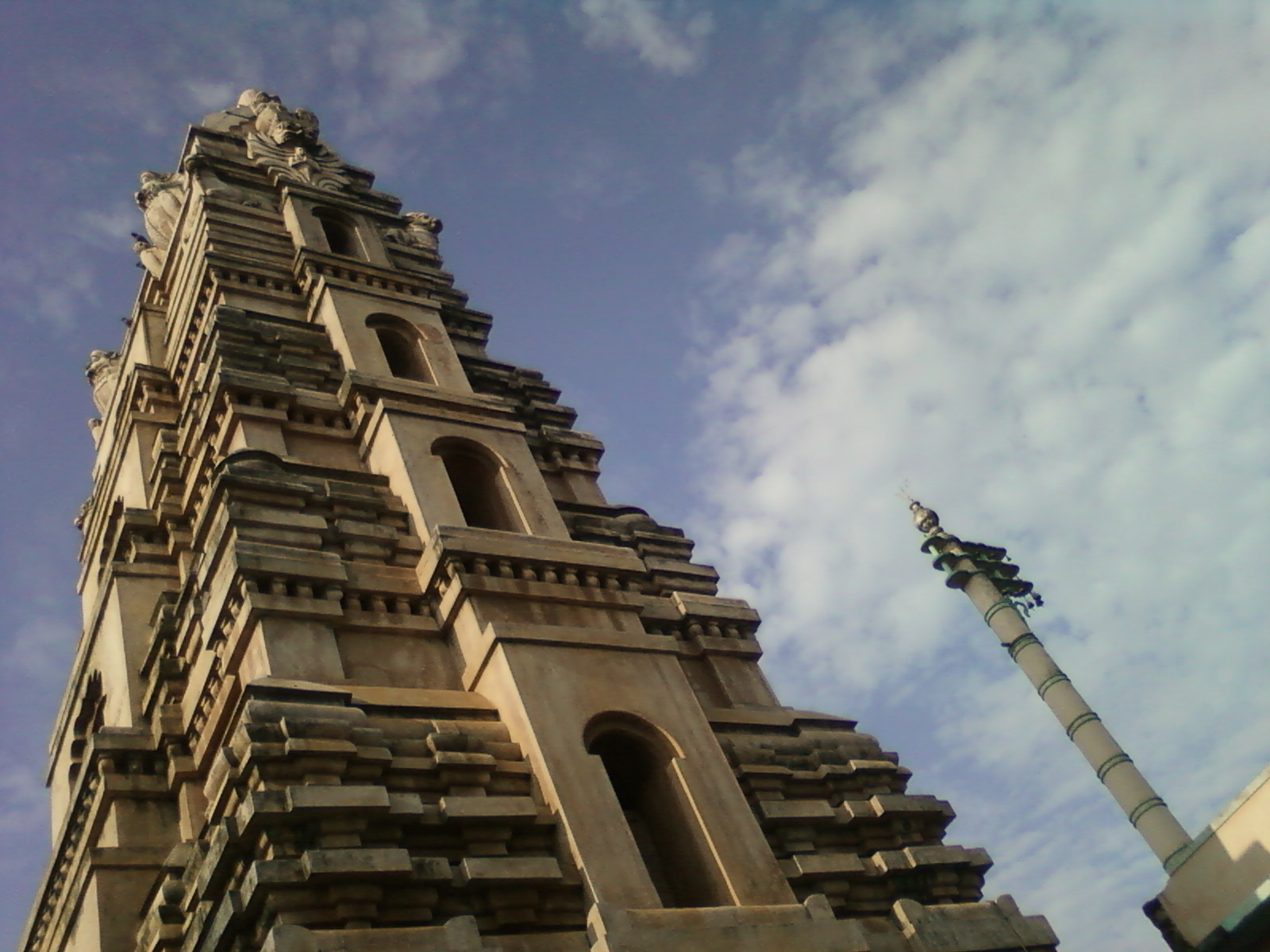
- Subrahmanya Swami Temple in Bikkavolu
- Interactive map of Biccavolu
- Location in Andhra Pradesh, India Biccavolu (India)
- Coordinates: 16°57′44″N 82°02′57″E
- Country: India
- State: Andhra Pradesh
- District: East Godavari
- Talukas: Bikkavolu
- Elevation: 12 m (39 ft)

Population (2011)
  - Total: 14,278

Languages
  - Official: Telugu
- Time zone: UTC+5:30 (IST)
- PIN: 533343
- Vehicle Registration: AP05 (Former); AP39 (from 30 January 2019)

Biccavolu is a village in East Godavari district in the state of Andhra Pradesh in India. The village is known for its famous Subrahmanya Swamy Temple.

== Geography ==
Bikkavolu is located at 16.9500°N 82.0500°E. It has an average elevation of 12 meters (42 feet).

== History ==
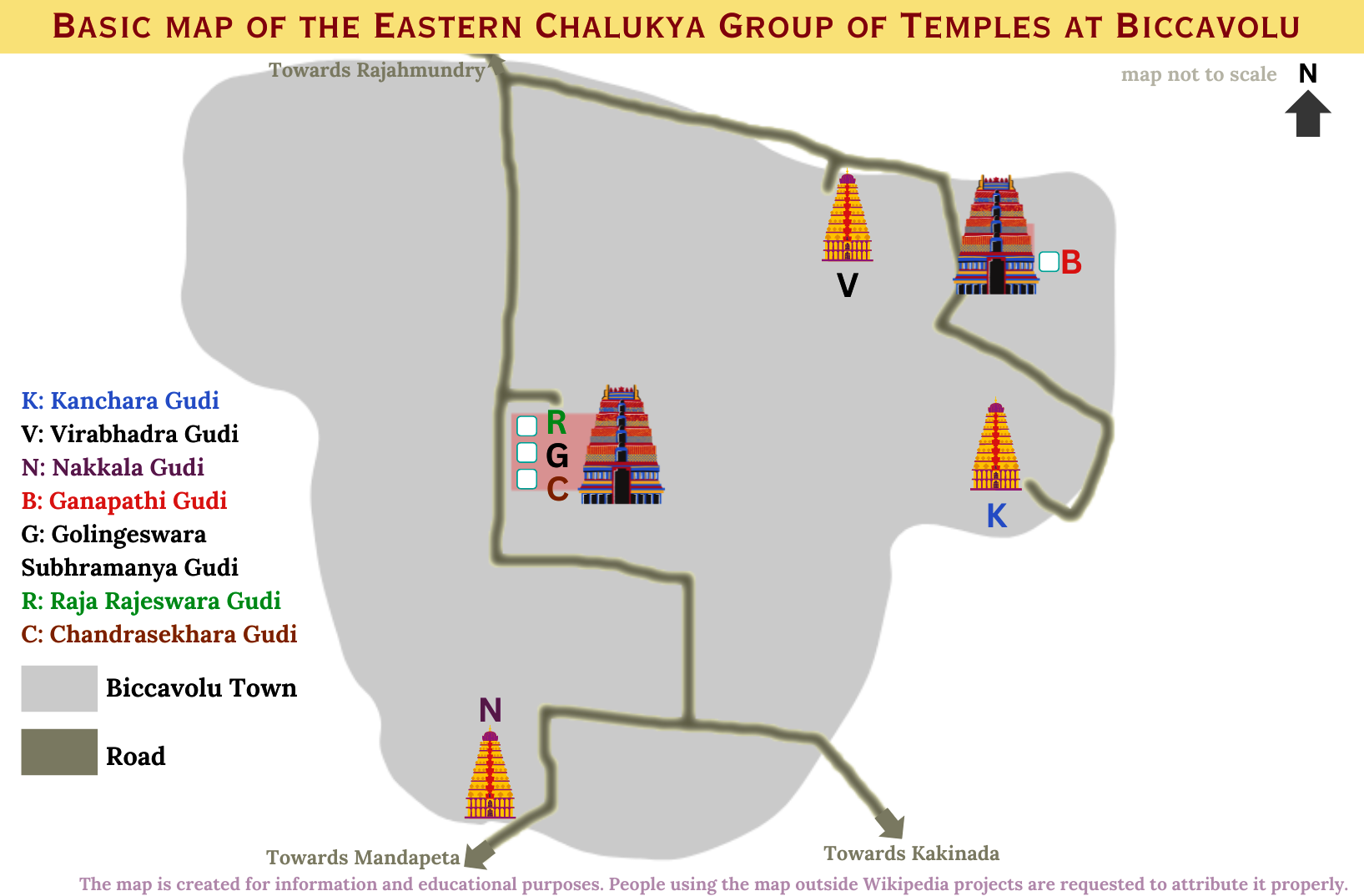
Map of Eastern Chalukya Group of Temples at Biccavolu

Bikkavolu was also known as Birudanka Rayapuram during the reign of Vengi Chalukyas.

== Demographics ==
As of 2001 India census, Biccavolu had population of 19,405. Males constitute 49% of the population and females 51%. Biccavolu has an average literacy rate of 70%, higher than the national average of 59.5%: male literacy is 75%, and female literacy is 66%.
