= Bestavaripeta =

- Village
- Interactive map of Bestavaripeta
- Location in Andhra Pradesh, India Bestavaripeta (India)
- Coordinates: 15°32′56″N 79°06′05″E
- Country: India
- State: Andhra Pradesh
- District: Markapuram
- Mandal: Bestavaripeta

Area
  - Total: 2.22 km^{2} (0.86 sq mi)

Population (2011)
  - Total: 7,606
  - Density: 3,430/km^{2} (8,870/sq mi)

Languages
  - Official: Telugu
- Time zone: UTC+5:30 (IST)
- Postal code: 523334
- Vehicle registration: AP

Bestavaripeta is a village in Markapuram district of the Indian state of Andhra Pradesh. It is the mandal headquarters of Bestavaripeta mandal in Markapur revenue division.

== Demographics ==
Bestawaripeta Located on the Guntur – Nandyala Highway. As of 2001 India census, Bestavaripeta had a population of 6496. Males constitute 53% of the population and females 47%. Bestavaripeta has an average literacy rate of 70%, higher than the national average of 59.5%; with 63% of the males and 42% of females literate. 11% of the population is under 6 years of age.

As per Population Census 2011 Bestawaripeta village has population of 7606 of which 3799 are males while 3807 are females. Average Sex Ratio of Bestawaripeta village is 1002 which is higher than Andhra Pradesh state average of 993. Population of children with age 0-6 is 780 which makes up 10.26% of total population of village. Child Sex Ratio for the Bestawaripeta as per census is 965, higher than Andhra Pradesh average of 939. Literacy rate of Bestawaripeta village was 79.09% compared to 67.02% of Andhra Pradesh.

Here below you can find PRAKASAM DISTRICT – BESTAVARIPETA MANDAL (RURAL) Area – MP CHERUVU (Code: 10890343) Sachiva Layam's Details like Secretariat Code, Secretariat Name, Grama Panchayat Name, Welfare and Education assistant, Panchayath secretary Grade -IV Digital Assistant, Village Revenue Officer, Cluster wise Volunteer Names & Secretariat Level Rice Cards.

== Background ==
Zilla Parishad Schools are generally established in rural areas while other government and private high schools cater to urban areas.

Zilla Parishad High School (ZPHS) is a type of state-run secondary school in India. These schools are established, supervised, and funded by the District Councils of India (locally known as Zilla Parishad, district level local authorities of states). ZP High Schools provide education for students from grades 6-10 of the Secondary School Certificate.

Mandal Parishad Primary School or Mandal Parishad Upper Primary School is the name of many government primary schools in India and most particularly in the states of Andhra Pradesh and Telangana. These schools are established, supervised, and funded by the Mandal Parishad (taluka level local authorities of states).Mandal Parishad Primary Schools provide education for students from grades 1–5.

== Administration ==
Parishad Educational Officer is responsible for preparing budget for the school and disbursing salaries for Zilla Parishad teachers. Director of School Education releases funds for this purpose.
