= Chintalapudi, Eluru district =

Chintalapudi
- Town
- Interactive map of Chintalapudi
- Location in Andhra Pradesh, India
- Coordinates: 17.0417°N 80.5901°E
- Country: India
- State: Andhra Pradesh
- District: Eluru
- Founder: Unknown
- Named for: At the entrance of town there are number of Tamarind trees చింతచెట్టు in Telugu language so the name of town called as చింతలపూడి

Government
  - Type: Commissioner
  - Body: Municipality

Population (2019)
  - Total: 35,242

Languages
- Time zone: UTC+5:30 (IST)
- PIN: 534460
- Telephone code: 08823, +91
- Vehicle registration: AP 37 (previous), AP 39(previous), now AP40

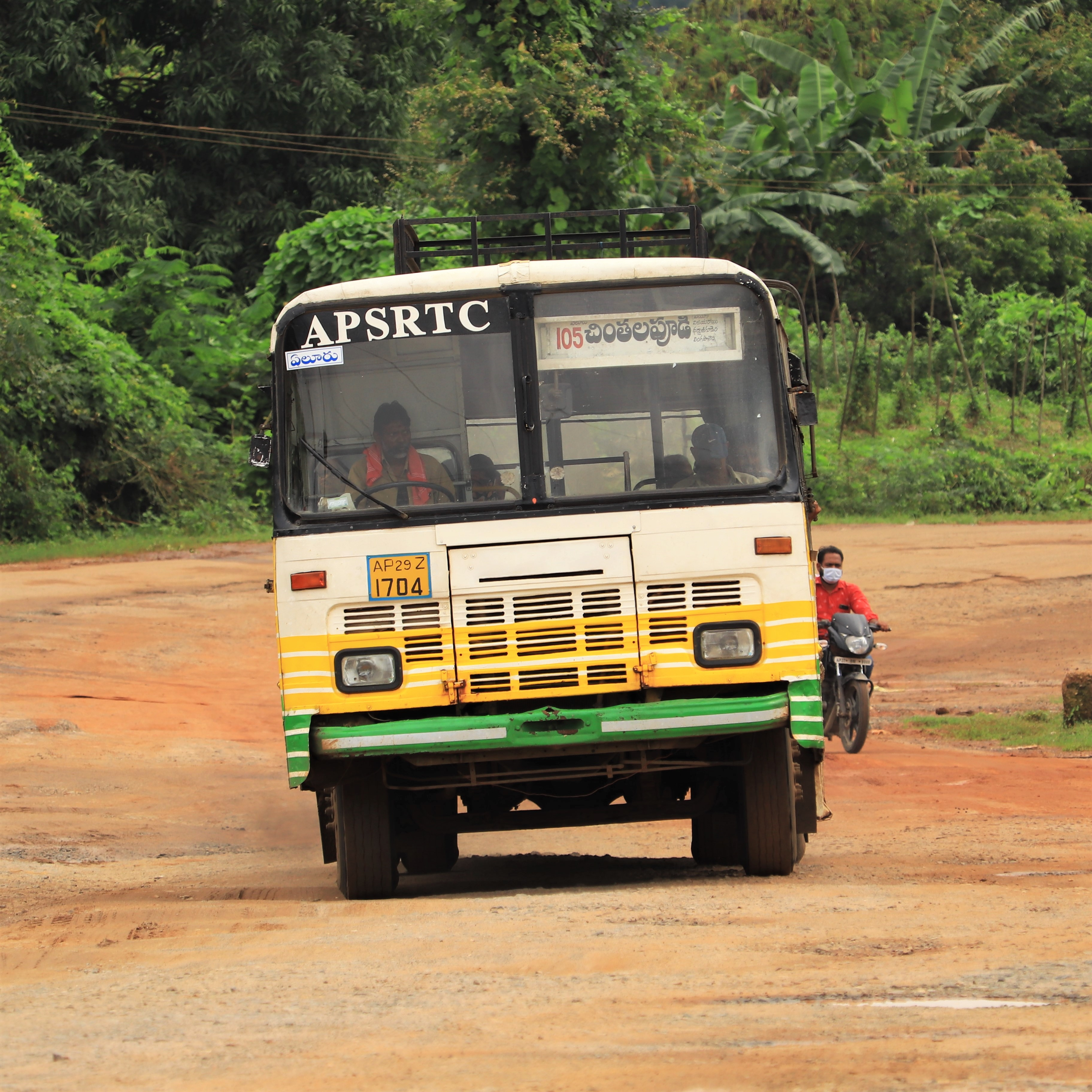
Eluru-Chintalapudi APSRTC bus near Janampeta aqueduct

Chintalapudi is a town municipality, constituency and mandal headquarters in Eluru District of the Indian state of Andhra Pradesh. Chintalapudi is one of oldest town in the Andhra Pradesh, but still it is under developed. There is no proper road and transport to the town. People of the town still struggling to reach the nearest cities. There is lot of history around this town, dates back to 600BC to 300BC.The human movement here from 2300 years ago. The village named Jeelakargudem is located 15 km away from here and contains some of the oldest ancient monuments in Buddhism. The carvings on the Sandrock hill are really surprising . According to the ASI and some historians the historical site belongs to Ashoka reign. The historical site is one of the best tourist attraction in the locality, but lack of proper care from government and people the site is ruining. This region is also famous for cultivation of palm oil. It contributes nearly 50% to 60% of total district cultivation of palm oil. According to some sources this region contains a vast coal reserves in the country. Your can find more on this in some popular news journals.

== Demographics ==
Chintalapudi is located in Eluru district, Andhra Pradesh. It has population of 35242 of which 12438 are males while 13514 are females as per Population Census 2011. In Chintalapudi village population of children with age 0-6 is 2652. Average Sex Ratio of Chintalapudi village is 1087 which is higher than Andhra Pradesh state average of 993. Child Sex Ratio for the Chintalapudi as per census is 997, higher than Andhra Pradesh average of 939. Chintalapudi village has higher literacy rate compared to Andhra Pradesh. In 2011, its literacy rate was 78.08% compared to 67.02% of Andhra Pradesh.

== Transport ==
Eluru is the nearest city to Chintalapudi at a distance of 47 km. APSRTC runs busses from Eluru, Jangareddygudem, Nuzivid and Sattupalli to bus station at Chintalapudi.
