= Jangareddygudem =

- Town
- Location in Andhra Pradesh, India
- Coordinates: 17°07′00″N 81°18′00″E
- Country: India
- State: Andhra Pradesh
- District: Eluru
- Constituency: Chintalapudi

Area
  - Total: 11 km^{2} (4.2 sq mi)

Population (2011)
  - Total: 48,994
  - Density: 4,500/km^{2} (12,000/sq mi)

Languages
  - Official: Telugu
- Time zone: UTC+5:30 (IST)
- PIN: 534 447,534455
- Telephone code: +91–8821
- Vehicle registration: AP-39

Jangareddygudem (JRG) is a municipality in Eluru district of the Indian state of Andhra Pradesh.

== Demographics ==
As of 2011 Census of India, the city had a population of 48,994. The total population constitute, 23,997 males and 24,997 females —a sex ratio of 1042 females per 1000 males, higher than the national average of 940 per 1000. 5,082 children are in the age group of 0–6 years, of which 2,605 are boys and 2,477 are girls—a ratio of 951 per 1000. The average literacy rate stands at 80.09% (male 83.61%; female 76.75%) with 35,169 literates, significantly higher than the national average of 73.00%.

== Geography ==
Jangareddygudem is an upland agency area. Its average elevation is 74 meters above sea level. It is not prone to any floods or damp soils.

== Civic services ==
Tobacco Board

The Tobacco Farmers bring their crop to the Tobacco Board for auction, in which Tobacco Board authorized companies participate to buy tobacco from farmers with the Board acting as middle man facilitating the auction by providing all facilities to farmers and traders from Crop development, Cultivation, Production, Loans etc. and payment processing through banks. Tobacco Board is an arm of Ministry of Commerce, Govt of India. The process of electronic auctioning of tobacco was first introduced in India (First across globe on FCV Tobacco) at the Jangareddygudem Tobacco Board. A Government hospital, established way back in 1980s, has been recently renovated as a spacious with multi-specialty services.

== Transport ==
The town has a total road length of 72.00 km (44.74 mi). Jangareddygudem bus depot is owned and operated by APSRTC. It operates bus services to most of the surrounding destinations and other districts. State Highway 42 connects the town with Palakollu and State Highway 44 with Eluru.

The nearest airport to Jangareddigudem is Rajahmundry Airport which is 65 km away.

== Education ==
The primary and secondary school education is imparted by government, aided and private schools, under the School Education Department of the state. Two government colleges: Sri Damodara Sanjivayya junior (SDSJ) college and Chatrapati Shivaji Trisatha Jayanti (CSTJ) degree college were established way back in early 1970s.
