= Veeraghattam =

- Village
- Interactive map of Veeraghattam
- Location in Andhra Pradesh, India
- Coordinates: 18.6833°N 83.6000°E
- Country: India
- State: Andhra Pradesh
- District: Parvathipuram Manyam

Population (2011)
  - Total: 14,315

Languages
  - Official: Telugu
- Time zone: UTC+5:30 (IST)
- PIN: 532460
- Vehicle Registration: AP30 (former); AP39 (from 30 January 2019)
- Nearest city: Parvathipuram

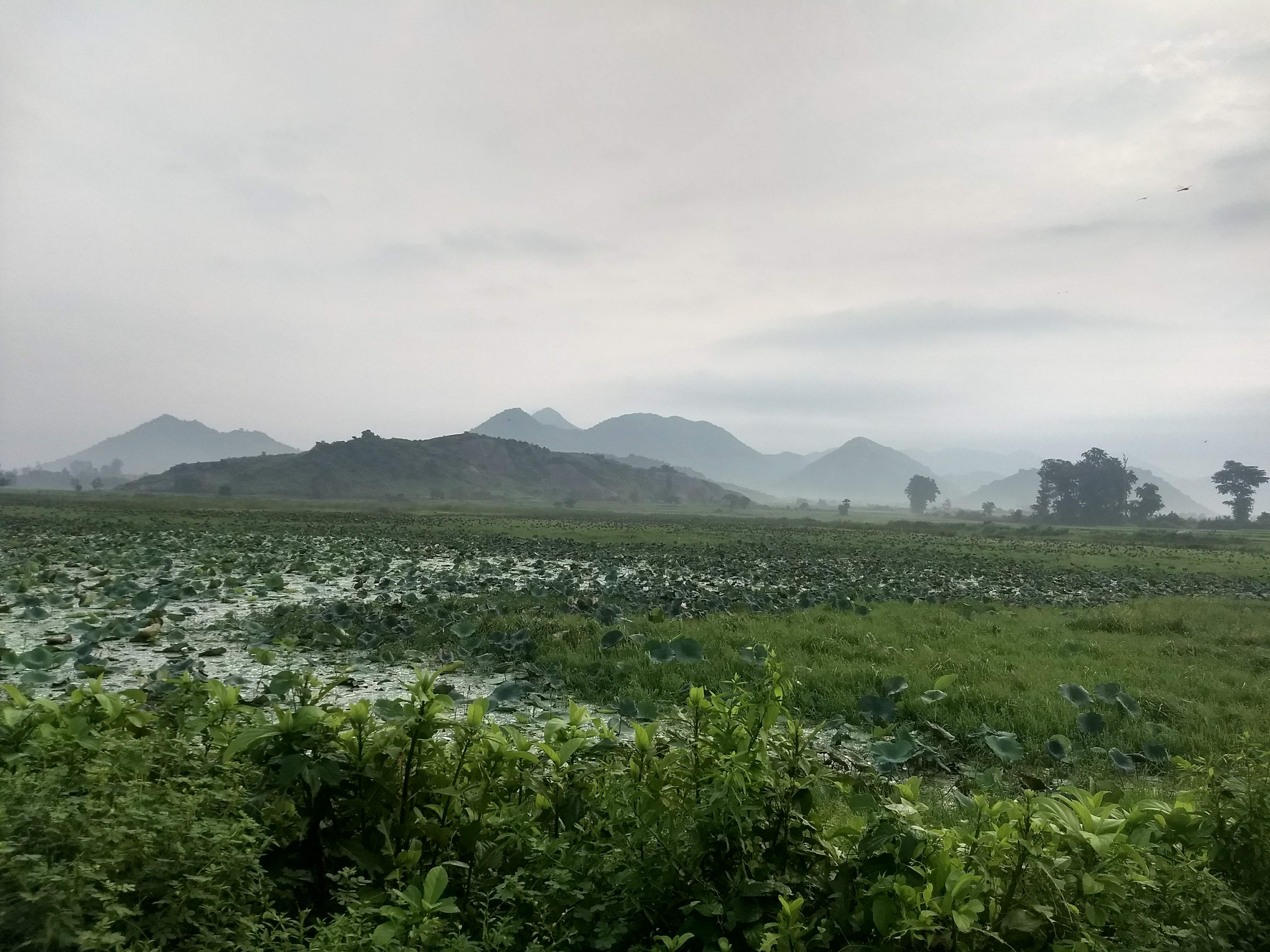
View of Eastern ghats from Raaja Cheruvu during monsoon

Veeraghattam is an Indian town in Parvathipuram Manyam district of Andhra Pradesh. It is located in Veeraghattam mandal of Palakonda revenue division.

== Geography ==
Veeraghattam is located near the Vattigedda river and Eastern Ghats. It has an average elevation of 83 metres (272 ft).

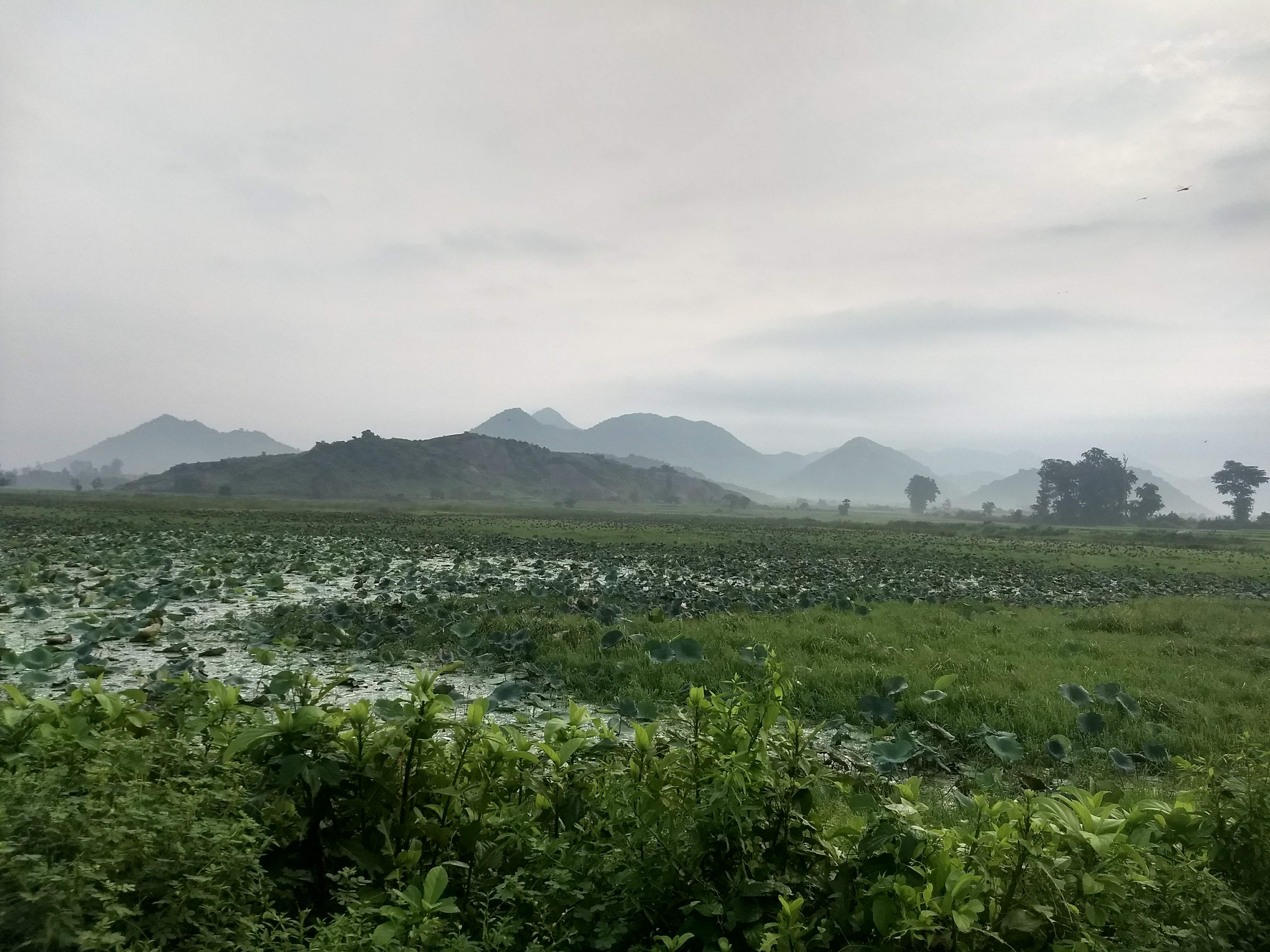
Eastern Ghats near Veeraghattam

== Demographics ==
As of 2011 census, Veeraghattam had a population of 14,315. The total population constitute, 6,911 males and 7,404 females —a sex ratio of 1071 females per 1000 males. 1,427 children are in the age group of 0–6 years, of which 741 are boys and 686 are girls. The average literacy rate stands at 70.89% with 8,638 literates, significantly higher than the district average of 61.70%. Owing to the tropical climate, agriculture and small scale business is the major occupation of the maximum population. There is no railway transport to this location, the nearest railway station is Parvatipuram Town at a distance of 27 km.

The main language spoken in the area is Telugu. English, Hindi and other languages are also spoken.

== Notables ==
- Kodi Rammurthy Naidu
- Karri Narayana Rao, member of 4th and 5th Lok Sabha representing Bobbili, was born in Santha Narsipuram village.
