= Piduguralla =

Piduguralla పిడుగురాళ్ళ Lime city
- Town
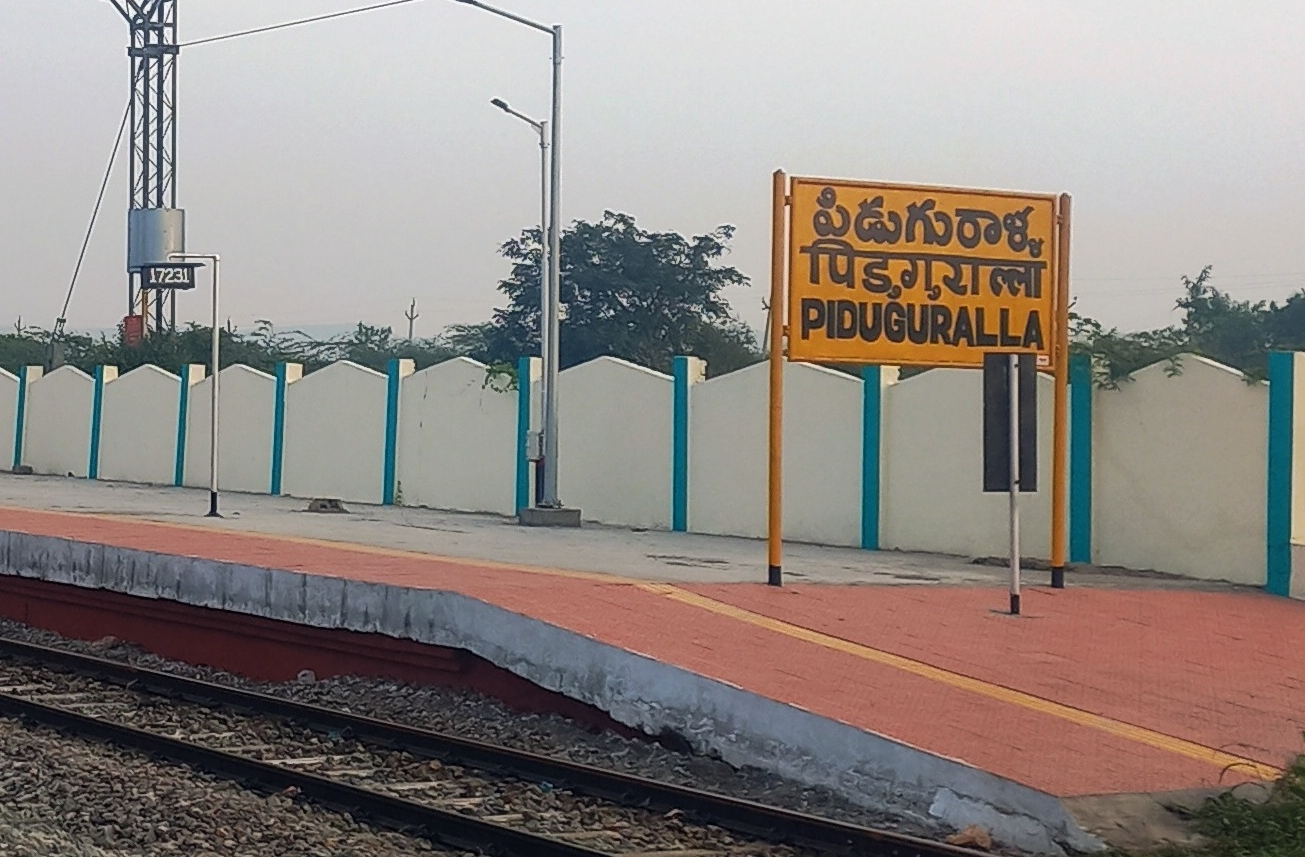

- Location in Andhra Pradesh, India
- Coordinates: 16.480368°N 79.889170°E
- Country: India
- State: Andhra Pradesh
- District: Palnadu

Government
  - Type: municipality

Area
  - Total: 31.49 km^{2} (12.16 sq mi)

Population
  - Total: 63,103
  - Density: 2,004/km^{2} (5,190/sq mi)

Languages
  - Official: Telugu
- Time zone: UTC+5:30 (IST)
- PIN: 522413
- Telephone code: +91–8649
- Vehicle registration: AP
- Website: Piduguralla Municipality

Piduguralla is a Town in Palnadu district of the Indian state of Andhra Pradesh. The Town is the headquarters of Piduguralla mandal and administered under Gurazala revenue division. The Town is also known as Lime City of India as there are abundant reserves of limestone.

== Governance ==
Civic administration

The Piduguralla municipality was formed on 21 May 2005 and has an extent of 31.63 km^{2} (12.21 sq mi).

Politics

Piduguralla is a part of Gurazala (Assembly constituency) for Andhra Pradesh Legislative Assembly. Yarapathineni Srinivasa Rao is the present MLA of the constituency from Telugu Desam Party. It is also a part of Narasaraopet (Lok Sabha constituency) which was won by Lavu Sri Krishna Devarayalu of Telugu Desam Party.

== Economy ==
Agriculture

Most of the people here depend on agriculture with fertile lands having abundance of water from the Nagarjuna sagar canals.

The major agriculture produce includes, paddy, cotton, chillies etc. Hence, the town has many rice and cotton mills.

Industries

There are many Limestone Kilns as well. So, one of the main professions of the people is quarrying and exporting limestone and white cement in Piduguralla.

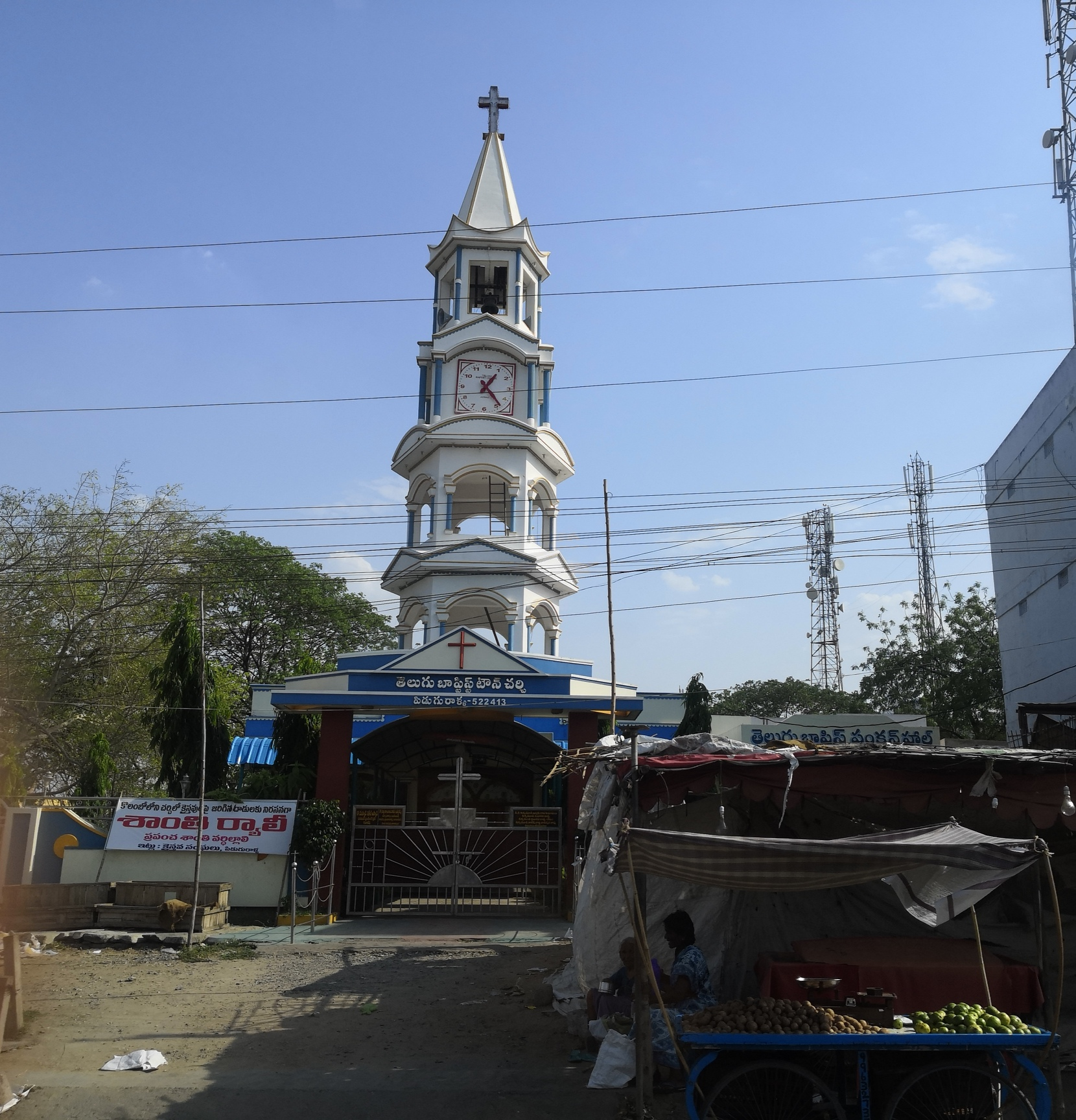
A church in Piduguralla

Business is not restricted to limestone only; there are several other industries such as timber depots, hollow brick industries, computer institutions, photo studios, printing presses, hand embroidery, fancy stores, stationery shops, pharmacies, etc. Overall it is one of the most important business places in Guntur district.

== Transport ==
National Highway 167A (NH167A) passes through Piduguralla. It is well connected by buses for Hyderabad, Chennai, Bengaluru, Tirupati, Nellore, Palnadu district, Amaravati, Vijayawada, Tenali, Narasaraopet, Macherla, Repalle, Warangal, Suryapet, Kodad, Sattenapalli and Ongole. It has a well established bus depot that connects villages around the town. The bus station code is PDRL.

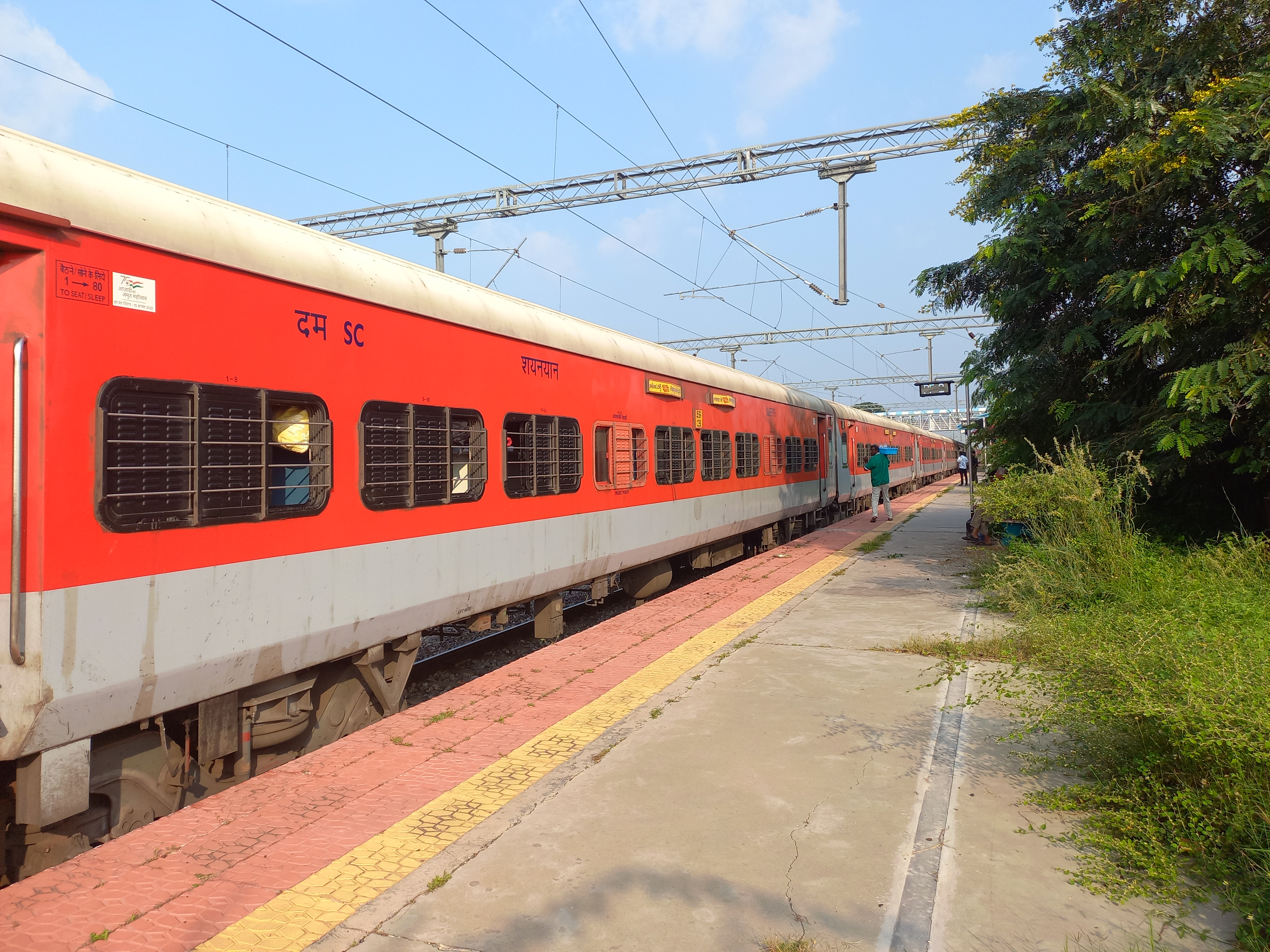
Kakinada - Mumbai LTT Express at Piduguralla

Trains from/to Palnadu district, Vijayawada, Vizag, Hyderabad, Chennai, Tirupathi, Kerala, and Kolkata pass via Piduguralla. Later, Guntur-Nadikudi-Macherla line was converted from Meter Gauge to Broad Gauge [under Project Unigauge] and a new line was laid from Bibinagar, near Hyderabad, to Nadikudi. Thus Piduguralla is connected directly to Hyderabad by Broad Gauge Line. Piduguralla is located on the Pagidipalle-Nallapadu section Guntur division of South Central Railway (SCR). The railway Station code for Piduguralla is PGRL.

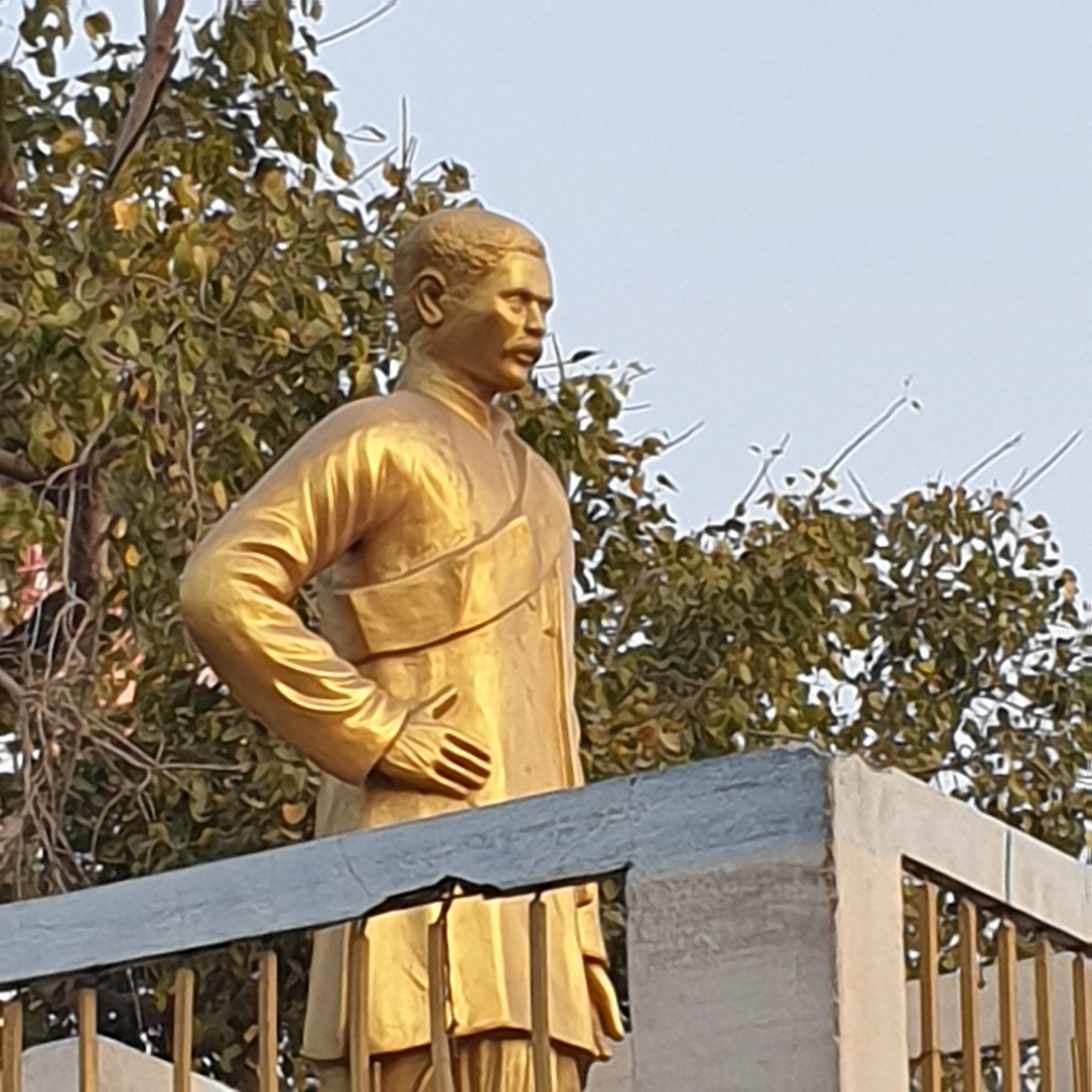
Statue of Telugu poet Gurram Jashuva in Piduguralla

The railway line is an electrified single line one and a new railway track (Nadikudi-Srikalahasti ) is under construction. In first phase of Nadikudi-Srikalahasti 46 km From New Piduguralla Junction to Savalyapuram Junction was completed. Electrification also Completed. Present Goods Trains are running in this Route. Waiting for Passengers Trains Running Conformation from Higher Authorities.

== Education ==
The primary and secondary school education is imparted by government, aided and private schools, under the School Education Department of the state. The medium of instruction followed by different schools are English, Telugu. Schools include Vivekananda public school,Tirumala Oxford EM High school, Scholars International school, Sri Chaitanya, Narayana, Bhashyam Schools. There are few degree colleges as well such as Tirumala Oxford women's degree college, Scholars degree college.
