= Dwarapudi =

Village in Andhra Pradesh, India

Coordinates: 16°57′N 81°56′E

Dwarapudi is a village in the East Godavari District of Andhra Pradesh. Dwarapudi is famous for its cattle market, cloths markets and Ayyapa temple. Dwarapudi is also known as Andhra Sabarimalai. Dwarapudi has its own train station.

Dwarapudi Train station

== Temples ==
On 20 March 2014 that Sri Venkateswara Swamy temple with gold coated sanctum sanctorum has been inaugurated in Dwarapudi Ayyappa Swamy temple on 19 March 2014.

== People ==
2. Dwarampudi
