= Rajamahendravaram revenue division =

- Revenue division
- Interactive map of Rajamahendravaram revenue division
- Coordinates: 17.0135°N 81.7815°E
- Country: India
- State: Andhra Pradesh
- District: East Godavari

Rajamahendravaram revenue division, formerly known as Rajahmundry revenue division, is an administrative division in the East Godavari district of the Indian state of Andhra Pradesh. It is one of the 2 revenue divisions in the district which consists of 13 mandals under its administration. Rajamahendravaram is the divisional headquarters.

== Administration ==
There are 13 mandals in Rajamahendravaram revenue division.

No.	Mandals
1	Rajamahendravaram Urban mandal
2	Rajamahendravaram Rural mandal
3	Kadiam mandal
4	Rajanagaram mandal
5	Seethanagaram mandal
6	Korukonda Mandal
7	Gokavaram mandal
8	Anaparthi mandal
9	Biccavolu mandal
10	Rangampeta mandal
11	Mandapeta mandal
12	Rayavaram mandal
13	Kapileswarapuram mandal

== See also ==
- List of revenue divisions in Andhra Pradesh
- List of mandals in Andhra Pradesh
