= Pendurthi Venkatesh =

Indian politician

Pendurthi Venkateswara Rao (born 1966) is an Indian politician from Andhra Pradesh. He was a former two time member of the Andhra Pradesh Legislative Assembly from Rajanagaram Assembly constituency in East Godavari district representing the Telugu Desam Party.

== Early life ==
Venkatesh is from Seethanagaram village, East Godavari district, Andhra Pradesh. He is the son of Ramachandhra Rao. He completed his BTech iat KLCE, Vijayawada, which is affiliated with Janardan Rai Nagar Rajasthan Vidyapeeth (deemed-to-be University), Udaipur. He runs his own business and declared assets worth Rs.11 crore in his affidavit to the Election Commission of India.

== Career ==
Venkatesh won the Rajanagaram Assembly constituency in the 2014 Andhra Pradesh Legislative Assembly election representing the Telugu Desam Party. He polled 81,476 votes and defeated his nearest rival, Jakkampudi Vijaya Lakshmi of the YSR Congress Party, by a margin of 8,887 votes. He first became an MLA winning the Rajanagaram seat in the 2009 Andhra Pradesh Legislative Assembly election where he polled 51,520 votes and defeated his closest opponent, Chituri Ravindra of the Indian National Congress, by a margin of 6,936 votes. he lost to Jakkampudi Raja of the YSR Congress Party in the 2019 Andhra Pradesh Legislative Assembly election by a margin of 31,772 votes.

In December 2024, he was appointed as the Programme Coordinator for the Chief Minister of Andhra Pradesh.
