= Rama Rao =

Rama Rao or Ramarao or Ramrao is an Indian name and may refer to:

- A. V. Rama Rao, Indian inventor and chemist
- Bhamare Subhash Ramrao (born 1953), Indian politician
- Bodduluri Rama Rao, Indian politician
- Gokina Rama Rao, Telugu film character artist
- K. S. Rama Rao, Telugu film producer
- K. T. Rama Rao, Indian politician
- M. S. Ramarao, Telugu film singer and composer
- N. T. Rama Rao Jr., Telugu film actor
- N. T. Rama Rao, Telugu film actor, former Chief Minister of Andhra Pradesh
- Palle Rama Rao, Indian scientist
- Panditrao Ramrao Deshmukh, Indian politician
- Rajendra Ramrao Nimbhorkar, Indian general
- Rama Rao Pawar, Indian politician
- Ramarao Patro, Indian classical singer in the Odissi genre
- Ramarao V. Naik, Indian classical singer
- Ramrao Adik, Indian politician and lawyer, former deputy chief minister of Maharashtra
- Ramrao Deshmukh, Indian politician
- Ramrao Krishnarao Patil, Indian politician and freedom fighter
- Ramrao Narayanrao Yadav, Indian politician
- Raosaheb Ramrao Patil (1956–2015), Indian politician
- Saheb Ramrao Khandare (born 1962), Indian writer
- Subhash Ramrao Zanak, Indian politician
- T. Rama Rao, Indian film maker
- V. Rama Rao, Indian politician

== See also ==
- Rama Rao's scorpionfish, a species of scorpionfish in India
- Ramaraogudem, a village in Andhra Pradesh, India
- Ramaraopet, a village in Andhra Pradesh, India
- Ramji Rao, a fictional character played by Vijayaraghavan in the Indian films Ramji Rao Speaking (1989), Mannar Mathai Speaking (1995) and Mannar Mathai Speaking 2 (2014)
- Ramrao Adik Institute of Technology, in Navi Mumbai, India
- Shri Raosaheb Ramrao Patil Mahavidyalaya
