= Rajanagaram Assembly constituency =

Constituency of the Andhra Pradesh Legislative Assembly, India

Coordinates: 17.079°N 81.90°E

Rajanagaram
- Constituency No. 49 for the Andhra Pradesh Legislative Assembly
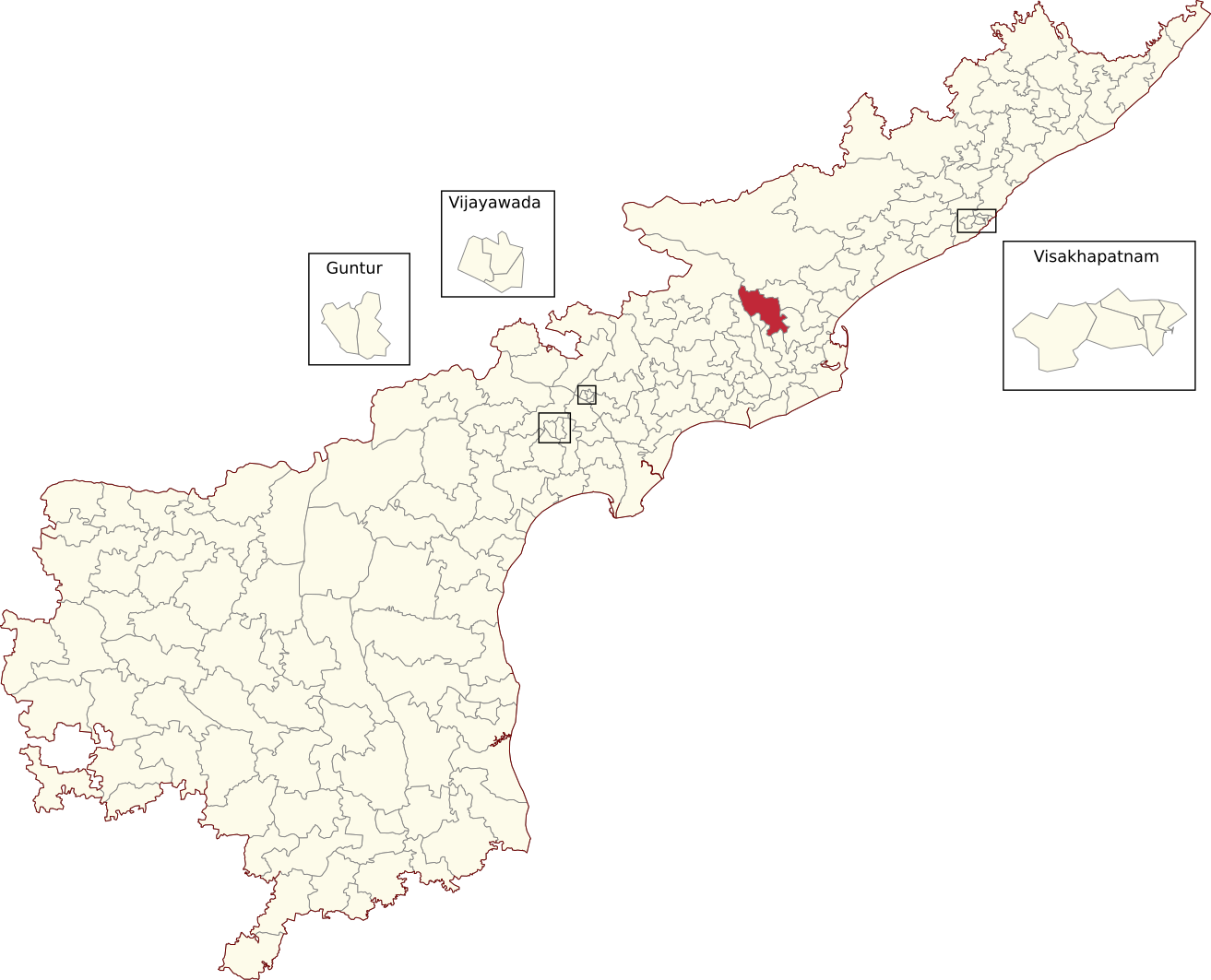
- Location of Rajanagaram Assembly constituency within Andhra Pradesh

Constituency details
- Country: India
- Region: South India
- State: Andhra Pradesh
- District: East Godavari
- Lok Sabha constituency: Rajamundry
- Established: 2008
- Total electors: 201,201
- Reservation: None

Member of Legislative Assembly
- 16th Andhra Pradesh Legislative Assembly
- Incumbent Bathula Balaramakrishna
- Party: JSP
- Alliance: NDA
- Elected year: 2024

Rajanagaram Assembly constituency is a constituency in East Godavari district of Andhra Pradesh that elects representatives to the Andhra Pradesh Legislative Assembly in India. It is one of the seven assembly segments of Rajahmundry Lok Sabha constituency.

Bathula Balaramakrishna is the current MLA of the constituency, having won the 2024 Andhra Pradesh Legislative Assembly election from Jana Sena Party. The constituency was established in 2008, as per the Delimitation Orders (2008).

== Mandals ==
The Assembly Constituency presently comprises the following Mandals:

Mandal
Rajanagaram
Seethanagaram
Korukonda

Mandals in Rajanagaram Assembly Constituency

== Members of the Legislative Assembly ==
Year	Member	Political party
2009	Pendurthi Venkatesh	Telugu Desam Party
2014	Pendurthi Venkatesh	Telugu Desam Party
2019	Jakkampudi Raja	YSR Congress Party
2024	Battula Balaramakrishna	Janasena Party

== Election results ==
=== 2009 ===
2009 Andhra Pradesh Legislative Assembly election: Rajanagaram
Party	Candidate	Votes	%	±%
TDP	Pendurthi Venkatesh	51,520	36.14	
INC	Chituri Ravindra	44,584	31.28	
PRP	Muthyala Srinivas	38,656	27.12	
Majority		6,936	4.86	
Turnout		142,552	86.48	
TDP win (new seat)				

=== 2014 ===
2014 Andhra Pradesh Legislative Assembly election: Rajanagaram
Party	Candidate	Votes	%	±%
TDP	Pendurthi Venkatesh	81,476	50.68	+14.54
YSRCP	J Vijaya Lakshmi	72,589	45.15	
Majority		8,887	5.53	
Turnout		160,757	85.90	−0.58
TDP hold		Swing		

=== 2019 ===
2019 Andhra Pradesh Legislative Assembly election: Rajanagaram
Party	Candidate	Votes	%	±%
YSRCP	Jakkampudi Raja	90,680	51.29	
TDP	Pendurthi Venkatesh	58,908	33.32	
JSP	Rayapureddy Prasad (Chinna)	20,847	11.79	
Majority		31,772		
Turnout		1,76,785	87.47	
YSRCP gain from TDP		Swing		

=== 2024 ===
2024 Andhra Pradesh Legislative Assembly election: Rajanagaram
Party	Candidate	Votes	%	±%
JSP	Bathula Balaramakrishna	105,995	55.51	
YSRCP	Jakkampudi Raja	71,946	37.68	
INC	Mundru Venkata Srinivas	1,901	1	
NOTA	None Of The Above	2,975	1.56	
Majority		34,049	17.83	
Turnout		1,90,938		
JSP gain from YSRCP		Swing		

== See also ==
- List of constituencies of the Andhra Pradesh Legislative Assembly
