= Andhra Shiridi =

Temple in East Godavari, India

Coordinates: 16.95°N 82.01°E

Temple Andhra Shirdi
- Sai Baba Temple
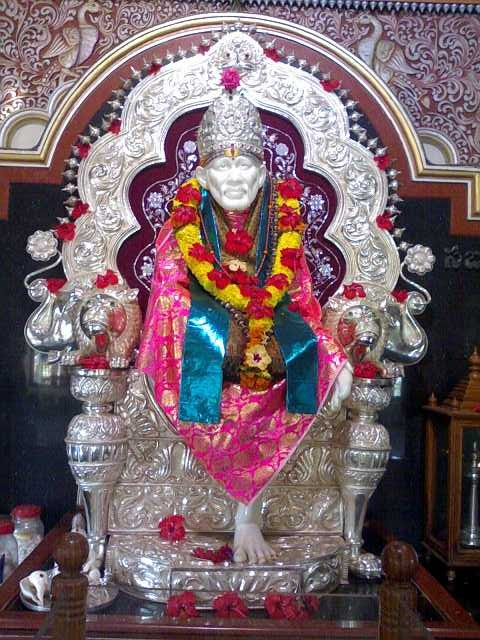

Religion
- Affiliation: Hinduism
- Deity: Sai Baba of Shirdi

Location
- Location: Balabhadrapuram
- State: Andhra Pradesh
- Country: India
- Interactive map of Temple Andhra Shirdi

Architecture
- Type: modern architecture
- Completed: 17 Feb 2005

Website
- http://www.andhrashirdi.org/

The temple of Andhra Shirdi is located in a small and prosperous village called Balabhadrapuram in Bikkavolu Mandal of East Godavari, located in the Indian state of Andhra Pradesh. As of 2014, the Temple had been under construction for nine years, with a total budget of ₹30 million Rupees, and another 20 million Rupees planned. The project's goal is to make "Andhra Shirdi" one of the most important and holiest temples in India.

== Sai Baba ==
The temple contains a statue of Sai Baba of Shirdi, an Indian guru that was erected on 17 February 2005. Sai Baba is a well-known figure in many parts of the world, especially in India, where he is much revered. His parentage, birth details, and life before the age of sixteen are obscure, which has led to speculation about his origins, and he showed characteristics of both Hinduism and Islam. Sai Baba is revered by several notable Hindu and Sufi religious leaders. Some of his disciples became famous as spiritual figures and saints.

== Sai Deeksha ==
Sai Deeksha or Sai Mala Dharana is one of the most auspicious spiritual practices observed in Andhra Pradesh, Maharashtra and Karnataka during the winter season. It is widely observed from January until March. Generally, Sai Deeksha is observed for 41 days. It is referred to as Mandala Deeksha. The Deeksha begins at least 41 days before Andhra Shirdi Varshikotsavam, which happens every year on 17 February. Some devotees observe 21 days of Deeksha and culminate Saimala before Varshikotsavam. They break their Deeksha in the Sai Baba temple at Shirdi. The dates to start Deeksha are often confirmed from local Brahmins or priests or Guruswami.
