= Angara, East Godavari district =

Angara
- village
- Interactive map of Angara
- Location in Andhra Pradesh, India Angara (India)
- Coordinates: 16.7733444°N 81.9330213°E
- Country: India
- State: Andhra Pradesh
- District: East Godavari
- Mandal: Kapileswarapuram
- Named for: Handloom Sarees

Population (2011)
  - Total: 14,000

Languages
  - Official: Telugu
- Time zone: UTC+5:30 (IST)
- PIN: 533307
- Telephone code: 08855
- Vehicle registration: AP 5

Angara is a village in Kapileswarapuram mandal East Godavari district of Andhra Pradesh in India.
