= Prakasamnagar =

- Village
- Interactive map of Prakasamnagar
- Location in Andhra Pradesh, India Prakasamnagar (India)
- Coordinates: 17.009433°N 81.790417°E
- Country: India
- State: Andhra Pradesh
- District: East Godavari district
- Mandal: Rajahmundry (urban) mandal

Languages
  - Official: Telugu
- Time zone: UTC+5:30 (IST)
- PIN: 533106

Prakasamnagar is situated in East Godavari district in Rajahmundry region, in Andhra Pradesh.
