= Anaparthy Assembly constituency =

Constituency of the Andhra Pradesh Legislative Assembly, India

Coordinates: 16.93°N 81.96°E

Anaparthy
- Constituency No. 40 for the Andhra Pradesh Legislative Assembly
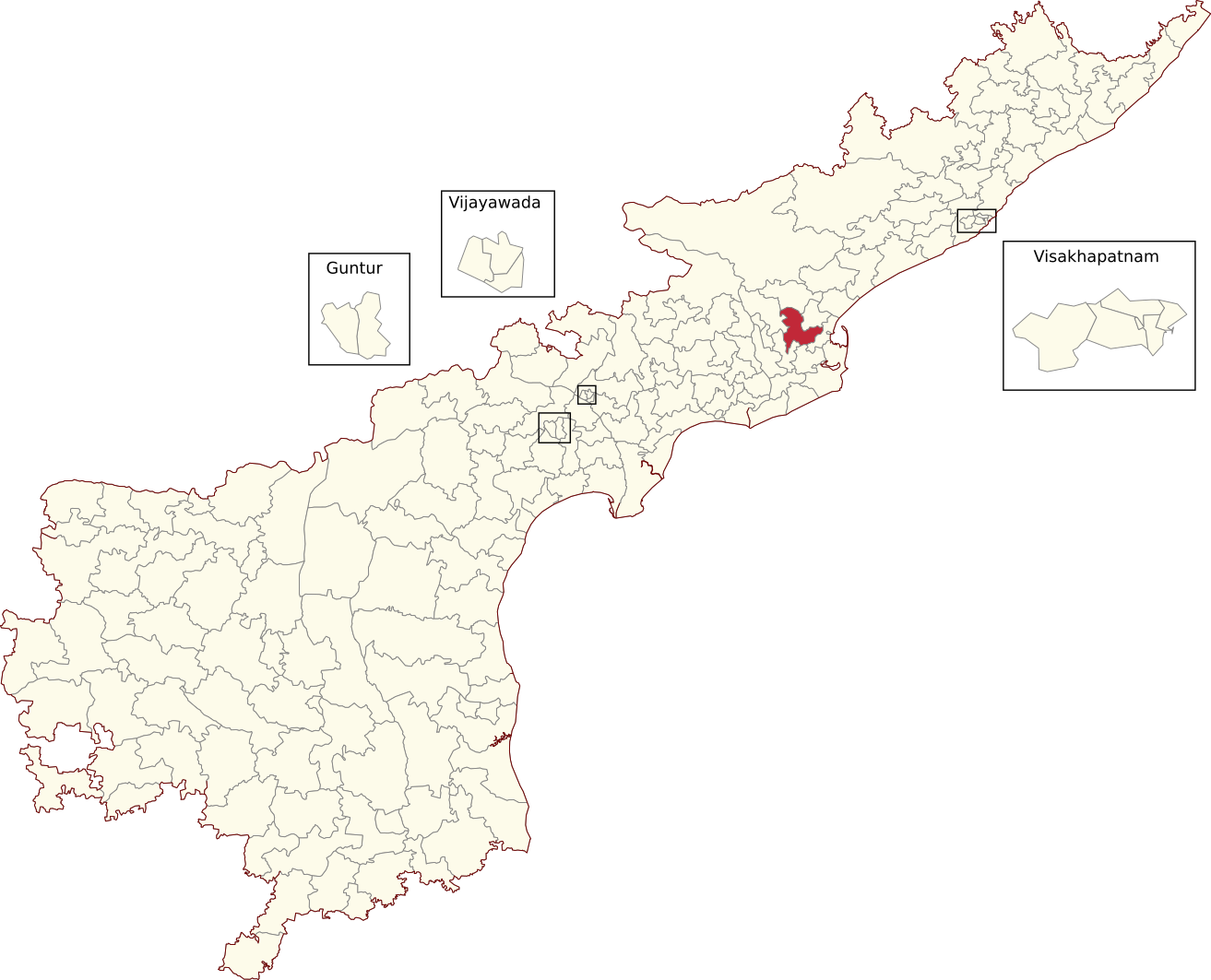
- Location of Anaparthy Assembly constituency within Andhra Pradesh

Constituency details
- Country: India
- Region: South India
- State: Andhra Pradesh
- District: East Godavari
- Lok Sabha constituency: Rajahmundry
- Established: 1951
- Total electors: 213,472
- Reservation: None

Member of Legislative Assembly
- 16th Andhra Pradesh Legislative Assembly
- Incumbent Nallamilli Ramakrishna Reddy
- Party: BJP
- Alliance: NDA
- Elected year: 2024

Anaparthy Assembly constituency is a constituency in East Godavari district and Kakinada district of Andhra Pradesh that elects representatives to the Andhra Pradesh Legislative Assembly in India. It is one of the seven assembly segments of Rajahmundry Lok Sabha constituency.

Ramakrishna Reddy Nallamilli is the current MLA of the constituency, having won the 2024 Andhra Pradesh Legislative Assembly election from Bharatiya Janata Party. As of 25 March 2019, there are a total of 213,472 electors in the constituency. The constituency was established in 1951, as per the Delimitation Orders (1951).

== Mandals ==
The four mandals that form the assembly constituency are:

Mandal
Pedapudi
Biccavolu
Rangampeta
Anaparthy

== Members of the Legislative Assembly ==
| Year | Member | Political Party |
|---|---|---|
| 1952 | Padala Satyanarayana Reddy | Indian National Congress |
| 1955 | Tetala Lakshmi Narayana Reddy | Kisan Mazdoor Praja Party |
| 1962 | Palacherla Panasaramanna | Communist Party of India |
| 1967 | Ramakrishana Chowdary Valluri | Indian National Congress |
| 1972 | Ramakrishana Chowdary Valluri | Indian National Congress |
| 1978 | Padala Ammi Reddy | Janata Party |
| 1983 | Nallamilli Moola Reddy | Telugu Desam Party |
| 1985 | Nallamilli Moola Reddy | Telugu Desam Party |
| 1989 | Tetali Rama Reddy | Indian National Congress |
| 1994 | Nallamilli Moola Reddy | Telugu Desam Party |
| 1999 | Nallamilli Moola Reddy | Telugu Desam Party |
| 2004 | Tetali Rama Reddy | Indian National Congress |
| 2009 | Nallamilli Seshareddy | Indian National Congress |
| 2014 | Nallamilli Ramakrishna Reddy | Telugu Desam Party |
| 2019 | Sathi Suryanarayana Reddy | YSR Congress Party |
| 2024 | Nallamilli Ramakrishna Reddy | Bharatiya Janata Party |

== Election results ==
=== 2024 ===
2024 Andhra Pradesh Legislative Assembly election: Anaparthy
| Party | Candidate | Votes | % | ±% |
|---|---|---|---|---|
| BJP | Ramakrishna Reddy Nallamilli | 105,720 | 53.73 | |
| YSRCP | Dr. Sathi Suryanarayana Reddy | 84,870 | 43.14 | |
| NOTA | None of the above | 3,105 | 1.58 | |
| Majority | | 20,850 | 10.59 | |
| Turnout | | 1,96,754 | | |
| BJP gain from YSRCP | | Swing | | |

=== 2019 ===
2019 Andhra Pradesh Legislative Assembly election: Anaparthy
| Party | Candidate | Votes | % | ±% |
|---|---|---|---|---|
| YSRCP | Dr. Sathi Suryanarayana Reddy | 111,771 | 59.86 | +12.80 |
| TDP | Ramakrishna Reddy Nallamilli | 56,564 | 30.30 | −17.55 |
| JSP | Relangi Nageswara Rao | 11,769 | 6.88 | |
| Majority | | 55,207 | 29.56 | |
| Turnout | | 1,86,745 | 87.48 | 1.74 |
| YSRCP gain from TDP | | Swing | | |

=== 2014 ===
2014 Andhra Pradesh Legislative Assembly election: Anaparthy
| Party | Candidate | Votes | % | ±% |
|---|---|---|---|---|
| TDP | Ramakrishna Reddy Nallamilli | 83,398 | 47.85 | +26.43 |
| YSRCP | Dr. Sathi Suryanarayana Reddy | 82,025 | 47.06 | |
| Majority | | 1,373 | 0.79 | |
| Turnout | | 174,274 | 85.74 | −1.34 |
| TDP gain from INC | | Swing | | |

=== 2009 ===
2009 Andhra Pradesh Legislative Assembly election: Anaparthy
| Party | Candidate | Votes | % | ±% |
|---|---|---|---|---|
| INC | Shesha Reddy Nallamilli | 70,623 | 45.16 | −16.39 |
| PRP | Gollalamamidada D.R.K.Reddy | 34,749 | 22.22 | |
| TDP | Nallamilli Moola Reddy | 33,500 | 21.42 | −11.24 |
| Majority | | 35,874 | 22.94 | |
| Turnout | | 156,386 | 86.08 | +4.42 |
| INC hold | | Swing | | |

=== 2004 ===
2004 Andhra Pradesh Legislative Assembly election: Anaparthy
| Party | Candidate | Votes | % | ±% |
|---|---|---|---|---|
| INC | Tetali Ramareddy | 61,194 | 61.55 | +12.63 |
| TDP | Nallamilli Moola Reddy | 32,466 | 32.66 | −17.29 |
| Majority | | 28,728 | 28.89 | |
| Turnout | | 99,421 | 81.66 | +8.79 |
| INC gain from TDP | | Swing | | |

=== 1999 ===
1999 Andhra Pradesh Legislative Assembly election: Anaparthy
| Party | Candidate | Votes | % | ±% |
|---|---|---|---|---|
| TDP | Nallamilli Moola Reddy | 47,786 | 50.0 | ▼2.5 |
| INC | Tetali Rama Reddy | 46,800 | 48.9 | ▲2.96 |
| Anna Telugu Desam Party | Tillapudi Satyaveni | 400 | 0.4 | |
| Ntr Telugu Desam Party (LAKSHMI PARVATHI) | Manepalli Murty | 325 | 0.4 | |
| Independent | Gunnam Rao | 142 | 0.2 | |
| Independent | Nallamilli Reddy | 79 | 0.1 | |
| Independent | Devanandam Vemagiri | 78 | 0.1 | |
| Independent | Sathi Reddy | 54 | 0.1 | |
| Majority | | 986 | 1.0 | ▼5.4 |
| Turnout | | 98,506 | 75 | ▼1.5 |
| TDP hold | | Swing | | |

=== 1994 ===
1994 Andhra Pradesh Legislative Assembly election: Anaparthy
| Party | Candidate | Votes | % | ±% |
|---|---|---|---|---|
| TDP | Nallamilli Moola Reddy | 48,281 | 52.5 | ▲7.2 |
| INC | Tetali Rama Reddy | 42,281 | 46.0 | ▼7.7 |
| BSP | Trimurtulu Kadalivotes=787 | | 0.9 | ▲0.6 |
| BJP | R. Velagala Sathi | 348 | 0.4 | |
| Independent | Pulagam Reddy | 114 | 0.1 | |
| Independent | Radha Reddytetali | 76 | 0.1 | |
| Independent | Tadi Reddy | 65 | 0.1 | |
| Independent | Rallapalli Apparao | 59 | 0.1 | |
| Majority | | 6,000 | 6.4 | ▼1.8 |
| Turnout | | 93,211 | 76.5 | ▼1.9 |
| TDP gain from INC | | Swing | | |

=== 1989 ===
1989 Andhra Pradesh Legislative Assembly election: Anaparthy
| Party | Candidate | Votes | % | ±% |
|---|---|---|---|---|
| INC | Tetali Rama Reddy | 48,711 | 53.7 | ▲8.9 |
| TDP | Nallanilli Moola Reddy | 41,073 | 45.3 | ▼9.1 |
| Independent | Venkatarama Reddy Manukonda | 401 | 0.4 | ▲0.6 |
| Independent | Velagala Satti Keddy | 290 | 0.3 | |
| BSP | Nakka Srinagesh | 280 | 0.3 | |
| Majority | | 7,638 | 8.2 | ▼1.4 |
| Turnout | | 93,147 | 78.4 | ▲0.4 |
| INC gain from TDP | | Swing | | |

=== 1985 ===
1985 Andhra Pradesh Legislative Assembly election: Anaparthy
| Party | Candidate | Votes | % | ±% |
|---|---|---|---|---|
| TDP | Nallamilli Moola Reddy | 43,552 | 54.4 | ▼12 |
| INC | Ammireddy Tadala | 35,831 | 44.8 | ▲12.3 |
| Independent | Ramakrishna Illa | 263 | 0.3 | |
| Independent | Anantharatu Ammiraju | 119 | 0.2 | |
| Independent | Vemagiri Devanandam | 117 | 0.2 | |
| Independent | Rallapalli Apparao | 117 | 0.2 | |
| Majority | | 7,721 | 9.6 | ▼23.8 |
| Turnout | | 80,715 | 78 | ▲1.6 |
| TDP hold | | Swing | | |

=== 1983 ===
1983 Andhra Pradesh Legislative Assembly election: Anaparthy
| Party | Candidate | Votes | % | ±% |
|---|---|---|---|---|
| TDP | Nallamilli Moola Reddy | 46,855 | 66.4 | |
| INC | Ammireddy Padala | 22,951 | 32.5 | ▲1.9 |
| Independent | Chikkala Veraswamy | 795 | 1.1 | |
| Majority | | 23,904 | 33.4 | ▲14.7 |
| Turnout | | 71,553 | 76.4 | ▼7.4 |
| TDP gain from JP | | Swing | | |

=== 1978 ===
1978 Andhra Pradesh Legislative Assembly election: Anaparthy
| Party | Candidate | Votes | % | ±% |
|---|---|---|---|---|
| JP | Padala Ammi Reddy | 37,261 | 49.5 | |
| INC | Undavilli Satyanarayana Murty | 22,982 | 30.6 | |
| INC(I) | Mallidi Haranatha Reddy | 13,199 | 17.6 | |
| Independent | Sanyasi Rao | 1,080 | 1.4 | |
| Independent | Gortha Janakayya | 336 | 0.5 | |
| Independent | Thondapu Sathi Reddy | 253 | 0.3 | |
| Independent | Gandrala Sreerama Murthy | 96 | 0.1 | |
| Majority | | 14,279 | 18.7 | |
| Turnout | | 76,267 | 83.8 | |
| JP gain from INC | | Swing | | |

=== 1972 ===
1972 Andhra Pradesh Legislative Assembly election: Anaparthy
| Party | Candidate | Votes | % | ±% |
|---|---|---|---|---|
| INC | Ramakrishana Chowdary Valluri | | | |
| Majority | | | | |
| Turnout | | | | |
| INC hold | | Swing | | |

=== 1967 ===
1967 Andhra Pradesh Legislative Assembly election: Anaparthy
| Party | Candidate | Votes | % | ±% |
|---|---|---|---|---|
| INC | Ramakrishana Chowdary Valluri | 25,822 | 41.34 | ▼7.85 |
| Independent | V. Goluguri | 25,419 | 40.69 | |
| CPI | Palacherla Panasaramanna | 9,908 | 15.86 | ▼34.94 |
| ABJS | A. Adapa | 889 | 1.42 | |
| Independent | S. Govindaram | 426 | 0.68 | |
| Majority | | 403 | 0.65 | ▼0.96 |
| Turnout | | 62,464 | 83.43 | |
| INC gain from CPI | | Swing | | |

=== 1962 ===
1962 Andhra Pradesh Legislative Assembly election: Anaparthy
| Party | Candidate | Votes | % | ±% |
|---|---|---|---|---|
| CPI | Palacherla Panasaramanna | 18,498 | 50.80 | ▲8.13 |
| INC | Tetala Reddy | 17,912 | 49.19 | |
| Majority | | 586 | 1.61 | |
| Turnout | | 36,410 | | |
| CPI gain from KMPP | | Swing | | |

=== 1955 ===
1955 Andhra State Legislative Assembly election: Anaparthy
| Party | Candidate | Votes | % | ±% |
|---|---|---|---|---|
| KMPP | Tetala Reddy | 24,926 | 54.66 | ▲30.08 |
| CPI | Kuvvuri Venkatareddi | 19,458 | 42.67 | ▲9.50 |
| Independent | Dandangi Apparao | 1,215 | 2.66 | |
| Majority | | 5,468 | 11.99 | ▲10.63 |
| Turnout | | 45,599 | 63.29 | ▼6.12 |
| KMPP gain from INC | | Swing | | |

=== 1952 ===
1952 Madras Legislative Assembly election: Anaparti
| Party | Candidate | Votes | % | ±% |
|---|---|---|---|---|
| INC | Padala Satyanarayana Reddy | 16,143 | 34.52% | 34.52% |
| CPI | P. Venkata Rao | 15,509 | 33.17% | |
| KMPP | T. Lakshminarayana Reddy | 11,494 | 24.58% | |
| KLP | S. Venkata Rao | 2,511 | 5.37% | |
| Independent | B. Venkanna | 1,102 | 2.36% | |
| Margin of victory | | 634 | 1.36% | |
| Turnout | | 46,759 | 69.41% | |
| Registered electors | | 67,364 | | |
| INC win (new seat) | | | | |

== See also ==
- List of constituencies of the Andhra Pradesh Legislative Assembly
