= Seethanagaram, East Godavari district =

Seethanagaram
- Village
- Interactive map of Seethanagaram
- Location in Andhra Pradesh, India Seethanagaram (India)
- Coordinates: 17°11′N 81°42′E
- Country: India
- State: Andhra Pradesh
- District: East Godavari
- Talukas: Seethanagaram

Languages
  - Official: Telugu
- Time zone: UTC+5:30 (IST)
- PIN: 533287
- Telephone code: 0883
- Vehicle registration: AP

Seethanagaram is a village in East Godavari District of the Indian state of Andhra Pradesh. It is the administrative headquarters of Seethanagaram mandal in Rajamahendravaram revenue division.

== Geography ==
Coordinates: 17°10'31"N 81°41'23"E
