= Kuthukuluru =

- revenue village
- Interactive map of Kuthukuluru
- Location within Andhra Pradesh
- Country: India
- State: Andhra Pradesh
- District: East Godavari
- mandal: anaparthi

Government
  - sarpanch: surya bharmanandha reddy (ysr.c.p)

Population
  - Total: 8,419

Languages
  - Official: Telugu
- Time zone: UTC+5:30 (IST)
- PIN: 533264
- Nearest city: Rajamundry
- Vidhan Sabha constituency: Anaparthy

Kutukuluru is an Indian village in Anaparthy mandal of East Godavari district, Andhra Pradesh.
