= Biccavolu mandal =

- Mandal
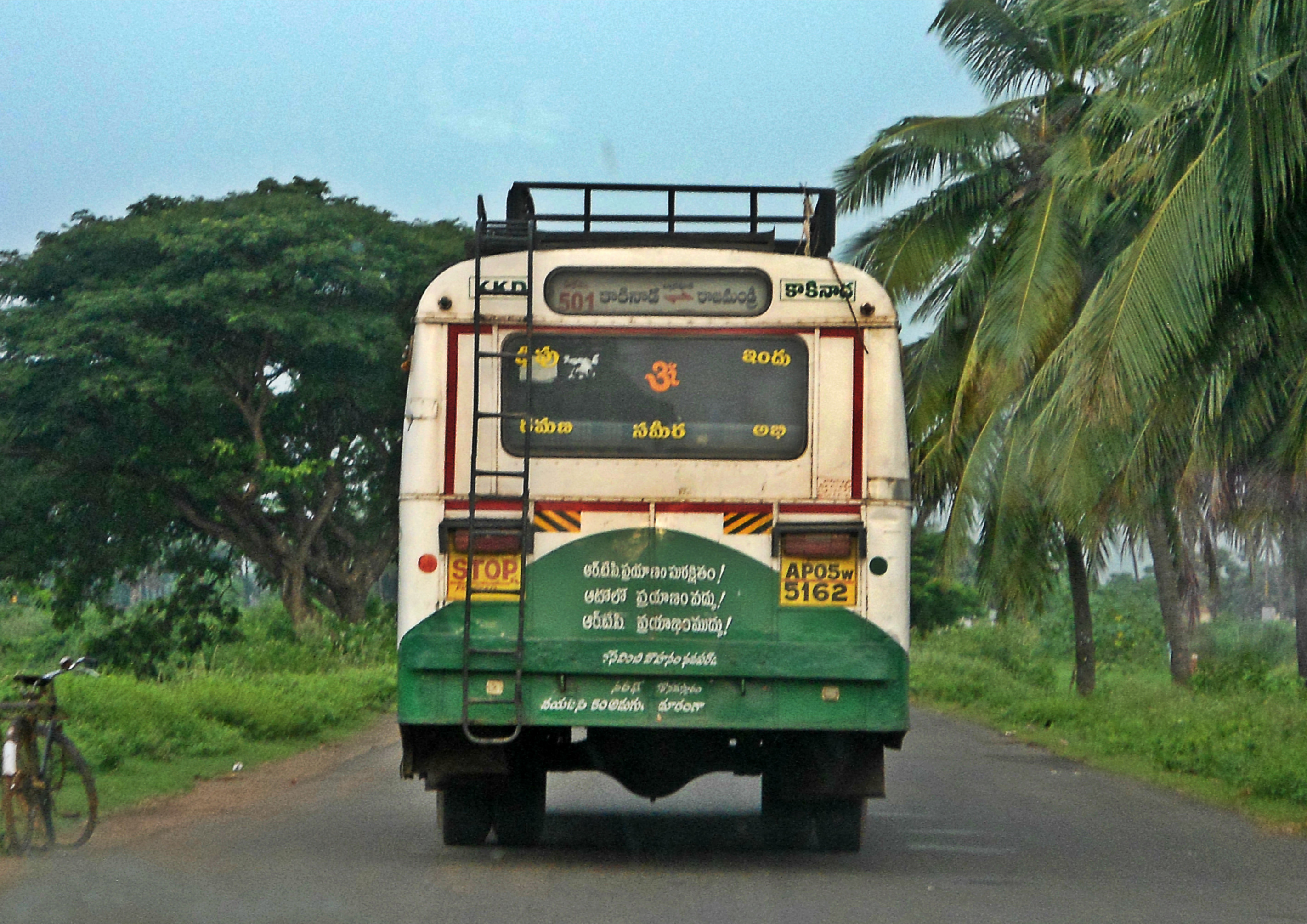
- APS RTC bus near Biccavolu
- Interactive map of Biccavolu mandal
- Location in Andhra Pradesh, India
- Coordinates: 16.9500°N 82.0500°E
- Country: India
- State: Andhra Pradesh
- District: East Godavari
- Headquarters: Biccavolu

Government
  - Body: Mandal Parishad

Area
  - Total: 100.58 km^{2} (38.83 sq mi)

Population (2011)
  - Total: 70,277
  - Density: 698.72/km^{2} (1,809.7/sq mi)

Languages
  - Official: Telugu
- Time zone: UTC+5:30 (IST)

Biccavolu mandal is one of the 19 mandals in East Godavari district of the Indian state of Andhra Pradesh. It is under the administration of Rajahmundry revenue division and the headquarters are located at Biccavolu village. Biccavolu Mandal is bounded by Rayavaram Mandal towards South, Pedapudi Mandal towards East, Anaparthy Mandal towards west, Ramachandrapuram Mandal towards north . It is located ata distance of 41 kilometres from Rajahhmundry.

== Demographics ==
As of 2011 census, the mandal had a population of 67,717 with 17,478 Households. The total population constitute, 33,642 males and 34,075 females, Average sex ratio of Biccavolu mandal is 1026 females per 1000 males. 6,952 children are in the age group of 0–6 years, of which 3,512 are boys and 3,440 are girls. Children sex ratio of Biccavolu is 979. The average literacy rate stands at 68.31% of which male has 72.36% and female has 72.36%.

== Governance ==
=== Administration ===
As of 2011 census, the mandal has twenty revenue villages, thirteen gram panchayats, of which all of them are villages. Rallakhandrika is the smallest Village and Biccavolu is the biggest Village in terms of population.

The settlements in the mandal are listed below:

1. Arikarevula
2. Biccavolu
3. Balabhadrapuram
4. Biccavolu
5. Illapalle
6. Kapavaram
7. Komaripalem
8. Konkuduru
9. Melluru
10. Pandalapaka
11. Rangapuram
12. Thummalapalle
13. Tossipudi
14. Voolapalle

Note: M-Municipality, OG-Out Growth

=== Politics ===
Biccavolu mandal is one of the mandals under Anaparthy (Assembly constituency), which in turn represents Rajahmundry (Lok Sabha constituency) of Andhra Pradesh.

== Education ==
The primary and secondary school education is imparted by mandal parishad, zilla parishad, government and private schools, which are both aided and unaided, under the administration of the School Education Department of the state. The medium of instruction followed by different schools are English, Telugu.

Important colleges in Biccavolu are Sree Rama Private Industrial Training Institute and Adarsa Jr College. There are many schools in Biccavolu. Netaji Public High school and SriRama High school teaches in English medium whereas, Zilla Parishad High Schools in Telugu medium.

== See also ==
- List of mandals in Andhra Pradesh
- Rajahmundry
- Anaparthy
