= Gurrajupeta =

Coordinates: 17°24′N 82°46′E

- Village
- Interactive map of Gurrajupeta
- Location in Andhra Pradesh, India
- Country: India
- State: Andhra Pradesh
- District: Anakapalli
- Mandal: S Rayavaram

Languages
  - Official: Telugu
- Time zone: UTC+5:30 (IST)

Gurrajupeta is a village in Visakhapatnam district of the Indian state of Andhra Pradesh. It is located in Rayavaram mandal.
