= Subrahmanya Sastry =

Subrahmanya Sastry is a surname. Notable people with the surname include:

- Jandhyala Subramanya Sastry (1951–2001), Indian screenwriter, director, and actor
- Sripada Subrahmanya Sastry (1891–1961), Indian writer
