= Bathula =

Bathula or Batula (Telugu: బత్తుల) is a Telugu surname. Notable people with the surname include:

- Bathula Balaramakrishna (born 1975), Indian politician
- Bathula Laxma Reddy (born 1969), Indian politician
- Sanjana Bathula (born 2008), Indian speed skater
