= Nallamilli Moola Reddy =

Indian politician (1944–2022)

Nallamilli Moola Reddy (1944 – 2 August 2022) was an Indian politician from Andhra Padesh. He was a former four time member of the Andhra Pradesh Legislative Assembly in the Anaparthy Assembly constituency in East Godavari district representing the Telugu Desam Party in 1983, 1985, 1994 and 1999.

== Early life ==
Reddy was from Ramavaram, Anaparthy, East Godavari district, Andhra Pradesh. He was the son of Subbireddy. He married Satyavathi and had a son and two daughters. His son Nallamilli Ramakrishna Reddy is also former MLA of Anaparthy. He declared assets worth Rs.1 crore in his affidavit to the Election Commission of India.

== Career ==
Reddy began his political career as a sarpanch of Ramavaram village for two terms from 1970 to 1983. He also served as the head of the Ramachandrapuram Cooperative Super Bazar in 1978. He was also the Rayavaram Samithi president in 1981.

He won the Anaparthy Assembly constituency in the 1983 Andhra Pradesh Legislative Assembly election representing the Telugu Desam Party. He garnered 46,855 votes and beat his closest opponent, Padala Ammireddy of the Indian National Congress by 23,904 votes. He retained the seat in the 1985 Andhra Pradesh Legislative Assembly election where he polled 43,552 votes and defeated his nearest rival, Tadala Ammi Reddy of the Indian National Congress, by 7,721 votes.

He lost the 1989 election to Tetali Ramareddy of the Indian National Congress by 7638 votes. He regained the seat for the TDP winning 1994 Andhra Pradesh Legislative Assembly election beating Congress candidate Tetali Ramareddy this time around. He polled 48,281 votes and won by a margin of 6000 votes. He became an MLA for the fourth time in the 1999 Andhra Pradesh Legislative Assembly election, where he got 47,786 votes and defeated Tetali Ramareddy once again by 986 votes.

=== Death ===
Reddy died on 2 August 2022 at his native village, Ramavaram.
