= Mahendrawada =

- village
- Nickname: Mayindhrada
- Interactive map of Mahendrawada
- Location in Andhra Pradesh, India
- Coordinates: 16°54′N 82°00′E
- Country: India
- State: Andhra Pradesh
- District: East Godavari
- Mandal: Anaparthy
- Talukas: Anaparthy

Government
  - Body: Panchayat

Population (2010)
  - Total: 5,941

Languages
  - Official: Telugu
- Time zone: UTC+5:30 (IST)
- PIN: 533342
- Vehicle registration: AP05

Mahendrawada is a village in Anaparthy mandal. East Godavari district of Andhra Pradesh in India.

== Notable people ==
- Kovvuri Dharma Reddy is a native of this village, he was involved in many welfare activities, He worked for both congress and YSR congress party for almost 40 yrs.
