= Sripada Subrahmanya Sastry =

Indian writer (1891–1961)

- Born: 23 April 1891; Polamuru, British India
- Died: 25 February 1961 (aged 69); Rajamandri
- Occupation: writer
- Parents: Lakshmipati Somayajulu (father); Mahalakshmi Sodemma (mother)

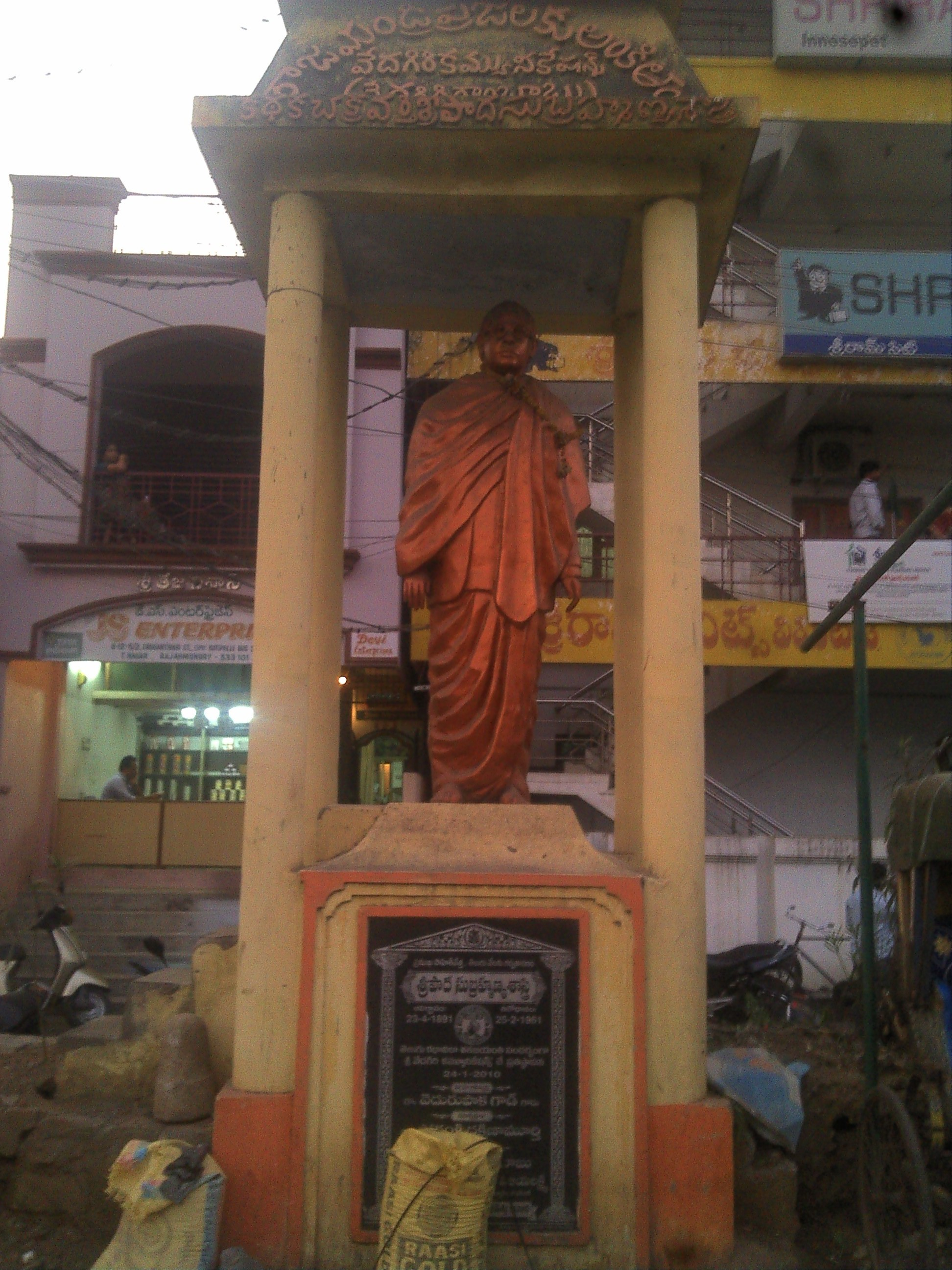
Statue of Sripada Subramanyam laid By Vedagiri Rambabu at Rajamundry

Sripada Subrahmanya Sastry (1891–1961) was a Telugu writer from Andhra Pradesh. His predominant works include short stories, novels, literary essays. He also performed Avadhanam. He is called Adhunika Katha Chakravarthy (King of modern short stories) because of his contributions to Telugu literature. He translated entire Valmiki Ramayana into Telugu prose. He ran a magazine called Prabuddha Andhra for 9 years.

== Early life ==
Subrahmanya Sastry was born on 23 April 1891 in Polamuru, East Godavari district of Andhra Pradesh to a Brahmin family. His parents are Lakshmipati Somayajulu and Mahalakshmi Somidevamma. His father, a Vedic scholar did not allow him to study anything except the traditional Hindu scriptures in Sanskrit. He completed his traditional education according his father's wishes and later pursued formal education.

== Works ==
- Anubhavalu Jnapakalunu (Experiences and memories)
- Vadla Ginjalu
- Pullampeta Jaree cheera
- Veeraanganalu (1924)
- Arikaalla kinda mantalu
- Veera Puja
