= Balabhadrapuram =

- Village
- Interactive map of Balabhadrapuram
- Location in Andhra Pradesh, India
- Coordinates: 16°57′30″N 82°00′20″E
- Country: India
- State: Andhra Pradesh
- District: East Godavari
- Founder: vogireddy ramareddy

Population (2014)
  - Total: 14,000

Languages
  - Official: Telugu
- Time zone: UTC+5:30 (IST)
- PIN: 533 343
- Telephone code: 08857
- Nearest city: Rajahmundry, Kakinada
- Lok Sabha constituency: Rajahmundry
- Vidhan Sabha constituency: Anaparti
- Distance from vijayawada: 180 kilometres (110 mi)
- Distance from visakhapatnam: 175 kilometres (109 mi)

Balabhadrapuram is an Indian village in Biccavolu mandal of East Godavari district, Andhra Pradesh.
