= Polamuru, East Godavari district =

Polamuru
- Village
- Interactive map of Polamuru
- Location in Andhra Pradesh, India Polamuru (India)
- Coordinates: 16.9110°N 81.9649°E
- Country: India
- State: Andhra Pradesh
- District: East Godavari
- Mandal: Anaparti
- Time zone: UTC+05:30 (IST)
- Pincode: 533342

Polamuru is a village in Anaparthy mandal, East Godavari district, Andhra Pradesh, India.
