= Gokavaram =

- village
- Interactive map of Gokavaram
- Location in Andhra Pradesh, India Gokavaram (India)
- Coordinates: 17.2667°N 81.8500°E
- Country: India
- State: Andhra Pradesh
- District: East Godavari
- Talukas: Gokavaram
- Elevation: 45 m (148 ft)

Population (2011)
  - Total: 16,389

Languages
  - Official: Telugu
- Time zone: UTC+5:30 (IST)
- PIN: 533286
- Telephone code: 91883
- Vehicle Registration: AP05 (Former); AP39 (from 30 January 2019)

Gokavaram is a village in Gokavaram mandal, East Godavari district in the state of Andhra Pradesh in India.

== Geography ==
Gokavaram is located at 17.2667°N 81.8500°E, about 20 km driveaway from Rajahmundry Airport. It has an average elevation of 45 meters (150 feet).
