= Khandare =

Khandare is a surname. Notable people with the surname include:

- Vinod G. Khandare, Indian army officer
- Saheb Ramrao Khandare
- Kabir Khandare, Indian child actor
