= Anveshana =

1985 Telugu film

- Theatrical poster
- Directed by: Vamsy
- Written by: Vamsy
- Produced by: Kamineni Prasad, K. Chinni (presenter)
- Starring: Karthik (Note: Karthik used the screen name Murali in Telugu initially.); Bhanupriya; Kaikala Satyanarayana; Sarath Babu; Rallapalli
- Cinematography: M. V. Raghu
- Edited by: Anil Malnad
- Music by: Ilayaraja
- Production company: Ramkumar Productions
- Release date: 22 May 1985
- Running time: 133 min
- Country: India
- Language: Telugu
- Budget: ₹15 lakh

Anveshana (transl. Quest) is a 1985 Indian Telugu-language mystery thriller film written and directed by Vamsy. The film stars Karthik, Bhanupriya, Kaikala Satyanarayana, and Sarath Babu, with music composed by Ilayaraja. The story follows an ornithologist and a police officer who arrive in a forest to investigate a series of killings allegedly committed by a man-eating tiger.

Anveshana received positive reviews for its screenplay, performances, and music, and was a commercial success. It ran for 100 days in 11 centres and was later dubbed into Tamil as Paadum Paravaigal in 1986. Over the years, the film has attained cult status and is regarded as one of the finest thrillers in Telugu cinema.

== Plot ==
Rao dreams of publishing a book on birds and the origin of music from their sounds. Pandu works as his driver. They stay in a forest house and prepare thesis on the topic. He appoints his friend's daughter Hema from a city to write the book. James is a forest ranger investigating the case of a man-eating tiger in that area. After Hema's arrival, Rao's manager Ghokale is brutally killed in the forest, allegedly by a tiger. Rao appoints manager Amar for assisting in his work. After his arrival, a bullock cart owner Sooranna is also killed in the forest, supposedly by a tiger.

It is revealed that Amar is actually a police officer in disguise who comes to investigate the serial killings in the forest. When Sooranna dies, he follows the tiger's pawprints and finds out that they actually belong to a human. He suspects that the murders are pre-meditated by a criminal. He also learns that the victims were actually following Hema as she wandered in the forest. He seeks the help of Hema in solving the case, to which she agrees. Whether they find the killer forms the rest of the story.

== Cast ==
- Karthik as Amar
- Bhanupriya as Hema
- Kaikala Satyanarayana as Rao
- Rallapalli as Paandu, Rao's driver and PA
- Sarath Babu as Range Officer James
- Subhalekha Sudhakar as Chantodu, mentally challenged
- Mallikarjuna Rao as Puliraju, Village president
- Y. Vijaya as Nagarathnam, Puliraju's wife and Shivudu's elder sister
- Viswanatham as Sooranna
- Balaji as Shivudu, Puliraju's brother-in-law
- Ponni as Sumathi
- Krishna Chaitanya as Gokhale
- Bheemiswara Rao

== Production ==
=== Development ===
Anveshana marked Vamsy's third film as a director after Manchu Pallaki (1982) and Sitaara (1984). Vamsy was inspired by his early love for detective novels in Pasalapudi, which fueled his interest in making a suspense film. During the production of Sitaara at Kovalam Beach, producer Kamineni Prasad expressed his desire to collaborate with Vamsy on a new project. Chinna, the owner of Hotel Apsara in Visakhapatnam, agreed to co-produce the film. With the support of Prasad and Chinna, Vamsy began developing a thriller, marking the early stages of Anveshana.

Vamsy recalled the Kannada film Aparichita (1978), which was set entirely in a forest. This inspired him to create a suspense story with a forest backdrop. Although he had an initial outline, early collaborations with other writers did not meet his expectations. Yandamuri Veerendranath was initially tasked with writing the dialogues, but Vamsy was dissatisfied with the results and decided to revise and rewrite them himself. Due to time constraints, Vamsy developed the story as a novel. This process was impacted by significant events, such as the assassination of Indira Gandhi and a cyclone, which delayed production but gave Vamsy the time needed to complete the story. For the screenplay, Vamsy spent time at a forest guest house in Araku Valley, where the director completed the script within two weeks, influenced by the location’s atmosphere. The producers were impressed with the completed novel and chose to adapt it directly for the film without writing a separate screenplay.

=== Filming ===
Art director Thota Tharani constructed sets in Talakona near Tirupati, where the film crew stayed in the nearby village of Nerabayalu. Despite limited facilities, the team adapted well, spending little time in their lodgings as they focused on their work. Cinematographer M. V. Raghu and his assistants joined Vamsy in scouting the forest for shooting locations, encountering wildlife, including a tiger, during their explorations.

The filming process involved extensive on-location shoots and was completed on a budget of ₹15 lakh over 60 days. The song "Yedalo Laya" was filmed at a waterfall in Talakona, believed to be linked to Lord Siva. The absence of a formal script meant that Vamsy directed scenes based on his vision and observations.

Vamsy and composer Ilayaraja traveled to Madurai to create the film's music. During the visit, Vamsy realized he had left the original script in Araku. He improvised by narrating the story from memory. Ilayaraja composed the music based on this retelling, which impressed Vamsy so much that he adjusted the script to fit Ilayaraja’s compositions. The background score, composed by Ilayaraja, took seven days to complete, longer than the typical four-day process. Notably, Bhanupriya dubbed her own voice for the first time in her career for Anveshana.

== Music ==
Ilaiyaraaja composed the music for this film. Vamsi and Ilaiyaraaja went to Madurai to compose the music for the film. It took more than a week for Ilaiyaraaja to compose the re-recording for this film. The lyrics of all the songs were written by Veturi and were recorded at the Prasad Deluxe Theatre in Madras. The music rights of the film were acquired by Aditya Music. The song "Ilalo" was reused from "Uyire Urave Ondru Naan" from the film Anbin Mugavari (1985).

No	Song title	Singer(s)	Writer(s)
1	"Keeravani"	S. Janaki, S. P. Balasubrahmanyam	Veturi
2	"Ekantha Vela"	S. Janaki, S. P. Balasubrahmanyam	Veturi
3	"Edalo Laya"	S. Janaki	Veturi
4	"Ilalo"	S. Janaki, S. P. Balasubrahmanyam	Veturi

== Reception ==
In his review for Zamin Ryot, Griddaluru Gopalrao appreciated Vamsy's screenplay and direction while being critical of the thin storyline. On the technical aspects, Gopalrao called M. V. Raghu's cinematography "marvellous", in addition to praising the score by Ilayaraja, and performances of Karthik, Satyanarayana, Rallapalli, Bhanupriya and Vijaya.

== Legacy ==
Anveshana has attained cult status over the years and is regarded as one of the finest thrillers made in Telugu cinema.

Karthik Varma Dandu, director of Virupaksha (2023), listed Anveshana as one of his favourite thriller films.
