= Bathula Balaramakrishna =

Indian politician

Member of the Andhra Pradesh Legislative Assembly
- Incumbent
- Assumed office 2024
- Preceded by: Jakkampudi Raja
- Constituency: Rajanagaram

Personal details
- Party: Jana Sena Party

Bathula Balaramakrishna is an Indian politician from Andhra Pradesh. He is a member of Jana Sena Party.

== Political career ==
Balaramakrishna was elected as the Member of the Legislative Assembly representing the Rajanagaram Assembly constituency in 2024 Andhra Pradesh Legislative Assembly elections. He won the elections by a margin of 34049 votes defeating Jakkampudi Raja of the YSR Congress Party.

== Electoral performance ==
2024 Andhra Pradesh Legislative Assembly election: Rajanagaram
Party	Candidate	Votes	%	±%
JSP	Bathula Balaramakrishna	105,995	55.51	
YSRCP	Jakkampudi Raja	71,946	37.68	
INC	Mundru Venkata Srinivas	1,901	1	
NOTA	None Of The Above	2,975	1.56	
Majority		34,049	17.83	
Turnout		1,90,938		
JSP gain from YSRCP		Swing		
