= Pasalapudi =

- Village
- Interactive map of Pasalapudi
- Location in Andhra Pradesh, India Pasalapudi (India)
- Coordinates: 16.848°N 82.009°E
- Country: India
- State: Andhra Pradesh
- District: East Godavari
- Mandal: Rayavaram

Population (2011)
  - Total: 8,130

Languages
  - Official: Telugu
- Time zone: UTC+5:30 (IST)
- PIN: 533261
- Telephone code: +91–8857
- Vehicle registration: AP

Pasalapudi is a village in Rayavaram mandal, located in East Godavari district of the Indian state of Andhra Pradesh.
