= Nallamilli Ramakrishna Reddy =

Indian politician

Member of Legislative Assembly Andhra Pradesh
- Incumbent
- Assumed office 2024
- Preceded by: Sathi Suryanarayana Reddy
- In office 2014–2019
- Preceded by: Nallamilli Sesha Reddy
- Succeeded by: Sathi Suryanarayana Reddy
- Constituency: Anaparthy

Personal details
- Party: BJP
- Occupation: Politician

Nallamilli Ramakrishna Reddy (born 1966) is an Indian politician from Andhra Pradesh. He is a former member of the Andhra Pradesh Legislative Assembly from the Anaparthy Assembly constituency in East Godavari district representing the Telugu Desam Party in 2014 and the Bharatiya Janata Party in 2024.

== Early life and education ==
Reddy is from Ramavaram, Anaparthy, East Godavari district Andhra Pradesh. He is the son of former MLA Nallamilli Moola Reddy. He completed his Bachelor of Engineering (Cat ivil) SRKR Engineering College, Bhimavaram in 1986. He runs his own business and declared assets worth Rs.3 crore in his affidavit to the Election Commission of India.

== Career ==
Reddy won the Anaparthy Assembly constituency in the 2014 Andhra Pradesh Legislative Assembly election representing the Telugu Desam Party. He polled 83,398 votes and defeated his nearest rival, Sathi Suryanarayana Reddy, of the YSR Congress Party, by 1,373 votes. He lost to Suryanarayana Reddy of the YSR Congress Party in the 2019 election by 55,207 votes, also on TDP ticket. Later, he shifted to the Bharatiya Janata Party and contested the 2024 Andhra Pradesh Legislative Assembly election on the BJP ticket. In 2024, he garnered 105,720 votes and beat Suryanarayana Reddy this time around by 20,850 votes.

He ranked first place among 175 MLAs in an ABN Channel survey. He conducted a programme in his constituency to solve people's problems and to interact with them directly, naming it Mana Intiki Mana MLA. This programme inspired chief minister Chandra Babu Naidu, who implemented it statewide and named it Inti Intiki MLA.
