= Rangampeta mandal =

Rangampeta Mandal
- Mandal
- Interactive Map Outlining mandal
- Country: India
- State: Andhra Pradesh
- District: East Godavari

Area
  - Total: 145.1 km^{2} (56.0 sq mi)
- Time zone: UTC+5:30 (IST)

Rangampeta Mandal is one of the 19 mandals in East Godavari District of Andhra Pradesh. As per census 2011, there are 15 villages.

== Demographics ==
Rangampeta Mandal has total population of 57,106 as per the Census 2011 out of which 28,913 are males while 28,193 are females and the Average Sex Ratio of Rangampeta Mandal is 975. The total literacy rate of Rangampeta Mandal is 58.55%. The male literacy rate is 52.47% and the female literacy rate is 51.8%.

== Towns & Villages ==
=== Villages ===
1. Doddigunta
2. Elakolanu
3. G. Donthamuru
4. Kotapadu
5. Marripudi
6. Mukundavaram
7. Nallamilli
8. Pedarayavaram
9. Chandredu
10. Rangampeta
11. Singampalle
12. South Thirupathi Rajapuram
13. Subhadrampeta
14. Vadisaleru
15. Veerampalem
16. Venkatapuram

== See also ==
- List of mandals in Andhra Pradesh
