= Sudhindra Bhaumik =

Indian vocalist

Sudhindra Bhaumik (born 22 April 1946) is a vocalist of the Agra Gharana.

== Early life ==
He was born in 1946 in Bangalore, Karnataka where he learned for many years under Ramarao Naik.

== Career ==
He continued to learn under S.C.R Bhatt, K. G. Ginde and Dinkar Kaikini. Bhaumik also learned from Thumri singer Shobha Gurtu and have received guidance under Y.M. Mahale, another veteran of the Agra Gharana. He later took on Priya Purushothaman as a guru for her classical training. She went on to publish the 2025 book The Call of Music that dedicated two chapters to Bhaumik's life.
