= Duvvuri Venkata Ramana Shastri =

- Born: 1897; Masaka Pally, Madras Presidency, British India
- Died: 1972 (aged 74–75)
- Occupation: Poet
- Writing career
- Period: 1895–1976

Duvvuri Venkata Ramana Shastri (1897–1972), popularly known as the Kalaprapurna Duvvuri, was a Telugu - Sanskrit scholar of the 20th century. He studied Sanskrit and worked as Telugu Lecturer for more than six decades. He wrote Ramaneeyam a book on Telugu grammar and he translated Pingarli Surana kalapurnodayam to Telugu as "Madhura Lalasa". In addition he wrote an autobiography. His autobiography was focused on many teachers and giants from Telugu literature rather than his birth and family details. He held high standards for good hand writing.

== Early life and personal life ==
Shri Duvvuri Venkata Ramana Shastri was born to Parvateesham, an affluent Brahmin in Masaka Pally, East Godavari District, A.P. India.

== Early career ==
Duvvuri taught in various colleges in Vishakhapattanam, Guntur.

== School of Thought ==
Shri Duvvuri was expert in teaching Telugu grammar using simple explanations. He viewed the two languages, Samskrutam and Telugu, as two eyes that need each other to get a perfect view.

== Literary career ==
Duvvuri Shashtri's literary works includes the following:

- Ramaṇīyamu
- Telugu Vyakarana Pada Koshamu

=== Autobiography ===
He wrote his memoirs or biography which was published in 1976 as Kaḷāprapūrṇa Duvvūri Veṅkaṭaramaṇaśāstri sviyacaritra.

== Awards and recognition ==
- Kalaprapoorna by Andhra University.
