= Mutyalapalem =

- Village
- Interactive map of Mutyalapalem
- Location in Andhra Pradesh, India
- Coordinates: 16°25′48″N 81°56′0″E
- State: Andhra Pradesh
- Region: Konaseema
- District: East Godavari
- Talukha: Razole
- Elevation: 5–25 m (16–82 ft)

Population (2011)
  - Total: 1,000

Languages
  - Official: Telugu
- Time zone: UTC+5:30 (IST)
- PIN: 533248
- Telephone code: 08862
- Parliament constituency: Amalapuram
- Assembly constituency: Razole

Mutyalapalem is a village in Konaseema district in the state of Andhra Pradesh, India.

== Geography ==
Mutyalapalem covers around 412 acres, and has approximately 210 houses. The total population of the village is around 1000. Mutyalapalem is about 3 km (1.9 mi) from the Bay of Bengal. It is part of the Konaseema delta, a triangle formed by the waters of the Godavari River and the delta.

== Gallery ==
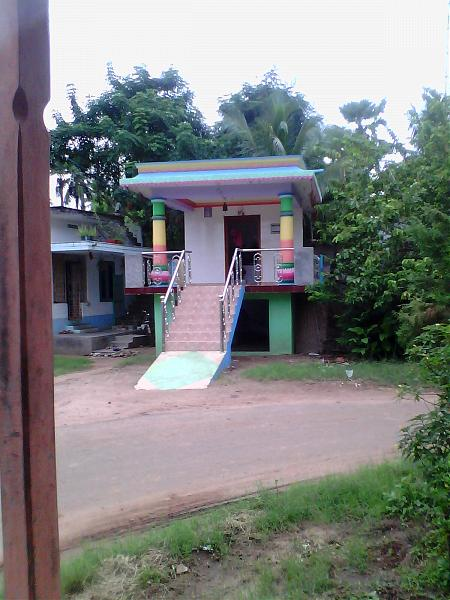
Ramalayam

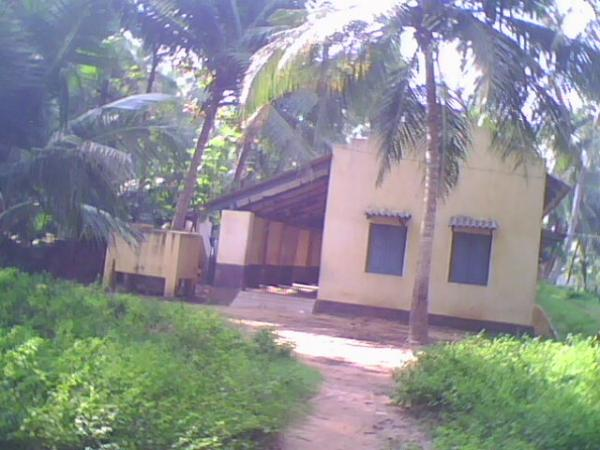
Primary School

Near by Tourism Places
