= Bhimakrosupalem =

- Village
- Interactive map of Bhimakrosupalem
- Location in Andhra Pradesh, India
- Coordinates: 16.795795°N 82.097182°E
- Country: India
- State: Andhra Pradesh
- District: Konaseema
- Mandal: Ramachandrapuram

Languages
  - Official: Telugu
- Time zone: UTC+5:30 (IST)
- PIN: 533 262
- Vehicle registration: AP

Bhimakrosupalem is a village near Draksharama in Ramachandrapuram mandal, Konaseema district in the Indian state of Andhra Pradesh.
