= Thammavaram =

- Village
- Interactive map of Thammavaram
- Location in Andhra Pradesh, India
- Coordinates: 17.038998°N 82.276029°E
- Country: India
- State: Andhra Pradesh
- Region: Kakinada
- District: Kakinada district

Area
  - Total: 0.42 km^{2} (0.16 sq mi)

Languages
  - Official: Telugu
- Time zone: UTC+5:30 (IST)
- PIN: 533005

Thammavaram is a village situated in Kakinada district in Kakinada, in Andhra Pradesh State, India.
