= Ramarao V. Naik =

Indian classical singer

Ramarao V. Naik (1909–1998) was an Indian classical singer of the Agra Gharana.

== Early life ==
Naik was born in 1909 in Bangalore. His father was a renowned violinist. He was one of the most renowned singers of the Agra Gharana in South India.

== Career ==
Naik learned music under the renowned singer Faiyaz Khan. He also learned from Swami Vallabhdas and Ata Hussain Khan. Naik also played the harmonium, which he has taught himself. He was known for popularising the Agra Gharana in the Carnatic Bastion of Bangalore. At this time Bombay and Bangalore where two cities where many Agra Gharana singers lived.

== Disciples ==
Some of his most prominent disciples are M.R. Gautam, Lalitha Ubhyankar, Meera Savoor, Sudhindra Bhaumik and Lalith Rao.

== Death ==
He died soon after a concert at the age of 88.
