= Gokavaram mandal =

Mandal in Andhra Pradesh, India

Gokavaram Mandal
- Mandal
- Interactive map of Gokavaram Mandal
- Country: India
- State: Andhra Pradesh
- District: East Godavari

Area
  - Total: 224.68 km^{2} (86.75 sq mi)
- Time zone: UTC+5:30 (IST)

Gokavaram Mandal is one of the 19 mandals in East Godavari District of Andhra Pradesh. As per census 2011, there are 14 villages.

== Demographics ==
Gokavaram Mandal has total population of 69,596 as per the Census 2011 out of which 34,352 are males while 35,244 are females and the average Sex Ratio of Gokavaram Mandal is 1,026. The total literacy rate of Gokavaram Mandal is 62.92%. The male literacy rate is 58.91% and the female literacy rate is 53.8%.

== Towns & Villages ==
=== Villages ===
1. Atchutapuram
2. Bhupatipalem
3. Gadelapalem
4. Gokavaram
5. Gummalladuddi
6. Kothapalle
7. Krishnunipalem
8. Mallavaram
9. Rampa Yerrampalem
10. Sivaramapatnam
11. Sudikonda
12. Takurupalem
13. Thantikonda
14. Tirumalayapalem

== See also ==
- List of mandals in Andhra Pradesh
