= Rangampeta =

- Village
- Interactive map of Rangampeta
- Location in Andhra Pradesh, India
- Coordinates: 17.0850502°N 81.9788967°E
- Country: India
- State: Andhra Pradesh
- District: East Godavari
- Talukas: Rangampeta

Population (2011)
  - Total: 7,983

Languages
  - Official: Telugu
- Time zone: UTC+5:30 (IST)
- Postal code: 533291
- Vehicle Registration: AP05 (Former); AP39 (from 30 January 2019)

Rangam-peta is a village and a Mandal headquarter in East Godavari district in the state of Andhra Pradesh in India.
