= Mandapeta mandal =

Mandapeta Mandal
- Mandal
- Interactive map of Mandapeta Mandal
- Country: India
- State: Andhra Pradesh
- District: East Godavari

Area
  - Total: 109.94 km^{2} (42.45 sq mi)
- Time zone: UTC+5:30 (IST)

Mandapeta Mandal is one of the mandal in East Godavari district of Andhra Pradesh. As per census 2011, there are 1 town and 13 villages.

== Demographics ==
Mandapeta Mandal has total population of 132,679 as per the Census 2011 out of which 65,724 are males while 66,955 are females and the Average Sex Ratio of Mandapeta Mandal is 1,019. The total literacy rate of Mandapeta Mandal is 72.52%. The male literacy rate is 67.65% and the female literacy rate is 63.11%.

== Towns and villages ==
=== Towns ===
1. Mandapeta (Municipality)

=== Villages ===
1. Arthamuru
2. Chinadevarapudi
3. Dwarapudi
4. Ippanapadu
5. Kesavaram
6. Maredubaka
7. Meruipadu
8. Palathodu
9. Tapeswaram
10. Velagathodu
11. Vemulapalle @ Seetayyapalem
12. Yeditha
13. Z.Medapadu

== See also ==
- List of mandals in Andhra Pradesh
