= Sathi Suryanarayana Reddy =

Indian politician

Sathi Suryanarayana Reddy (born 1962) is an Indian politician from Andhra Pradesh. He won the 2019 Andhra Pradesh Legislative Assembly Election from Anaparthy Constituency in East Godavari District.

== Early life and education ==
He hails from Anaparthy, East Godavari District. He was born to the late Gangireddy. He married Adilakshmi. He completed his M.B.B.S. from Siddhartha Medical College, Vijayawada, Nagarjuna University and did his M.S. from JJM Medical College at Davanagere, University of Mysore in 1991.

== Career ==
He began his political journey with the Indian National Congress Party. Later in 2014, he joined YSR Congress Party but lost the Anaparthy Assembly seat in the 2014 Andhra Pradesh Legislative Assembly Election on YSRCP ticket. Representing YSRCP, he won the 2019 Andhra Pradesh Legislative Assembly Election from Anaparthy defeating Ramakrishna Reddy Nallamilli of Telugu Desam Party with a margin of 55,207 votes.

As a medical doctor, he charges a nominal fee of Rs.10 per patient which he has not raised for the last 27 years.
