= Anaparthi mandal =

Anaparthi Mandal
- Mandal
- Interactive map of Anaparthi Mandal
- Country: India
- State: Andhra Pradesh
- District: East Godavari
- Time zone: UTC+5:30 (IST)

Anaparthi Mandal is one of the 19 mandals in East Godavari District of Andhra Pradesh. As per census 2011, there are 9 villages.

== Demographics ==
Anaparthi Mandal has total population of 70,859 as per the Census 2011 out of which 35,395 are males while 35,464 are females and the average Sex Ratio of Anaparthi Mandal is 1,002. The total literacy rate of Anaparthi Mandal is 72.37%. The male literacy rate is 69.02% and the female literacy rate is 62.3%.

== Towns & Villages ==
=== Villages ===
1. Anaparthi
2. Duppalapudi
3. Koppavaram
4. Kutukuluru
5. Mahendrawada
6. Pedaparthi
7. Polamuru
8. Pulagurtha
9. Ramavaram

== See also ==
- List of mandals in Andhra Pradesh
