= Kondukuduru =

- Village
- Interactive map of Kondukuduru
- Location in Andhra Pradesh, India Kondukuduru (India)
- Coordinates: 16.66154°N 82.075528°E
- Country: India
- State: Andhra Pradesh
- Region: Konaseema
- District: Konaseema district

Languages
  - Official: Telugu
- Time zone: UTC+5:30 (IST)
- PIN: 533211

Kondukuduru is a village located in the Ainavilli Mandal of the Konaseema district in the state of Andhra Pradesh, India. Situated approximately 10 kilometers away from the sub-district headquarters in Ainavilli, the village is part of the Konaseema region, celebrated for its lush green paddy fields and coconut groves.

== Geography ==
Geographically positioned at coordinates 16°54′43″N 82°02′02″E, Kondukuduru covers a total area of 219 hectares (2.19 square kilometers). The village is situated at an elevation of 8 meters (26 feet) above sea level. Its proximity to the Tulyabhaga River, a tributary of the Godavari River, contributes to its fertile land and agricultural productivity.

== Demographics ==
As of the 2011 Census, Kondukuduru has a population of 1,677 residents, with a nearly equal gender distribution of 868 males and 809 females. The village comprises 467 households. The literacy rate in Kondukuduru is 61.84%, with male literacy at 67.86% and female literacy at 55.38%.

== Economy ==
The economy of Kondukuduru is primarily based on agriculture and allied activities. The village benefits from the fertile soil and abundant water supply from the Tulyabhaga River, making it suitable for the cultivation of paddy, coconut, and other crops. Additionally, the village engages in fisheries and dairy farming, contributing to its local economy.

== Administration ==
Kondukuduru falls under the jurisdiction of the Kondukuduru Gram Panchayat, which is responsible for providing civic amenities such as sanitation, drinking water supply, and street lighting. The Panchayat also undertakes various developmental activities based on the availability of funds. The village is part of the Ainavilli Mandal within the East Godavari district.

== Culture and festivals ==
=== Festivals and celebrations ===
==== Akkamma Jatara ====
Description: The Akkamma Jatara, also known as the Sri Sri Sri Arla Akkamma Talli Jatara, is one of the most significant festivals in Kondukuduru. This annual event is dedicated to the village deity, Sri Sri Sri Arla Akkamma Talli.

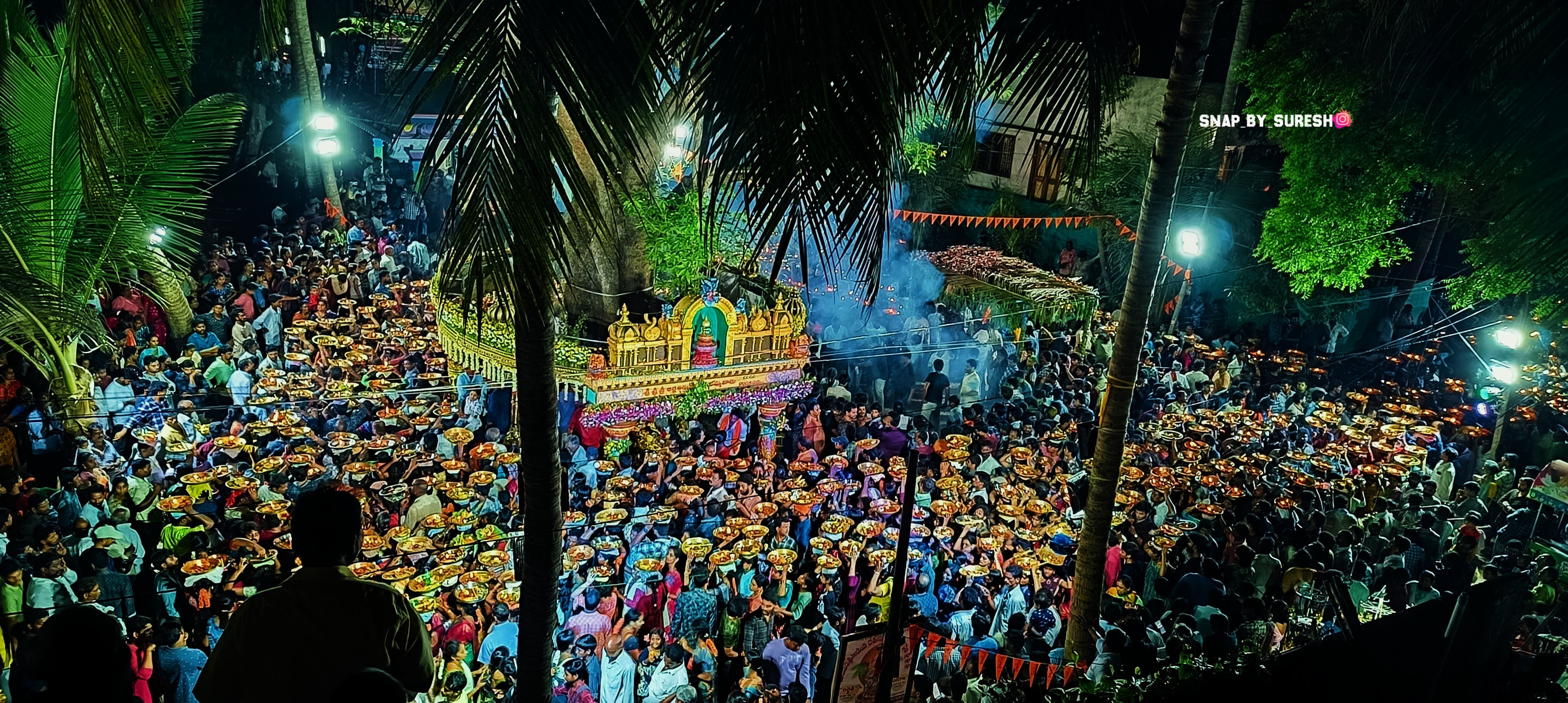
Kondukuduru_Akkamma Jatara

Activities: The festival includes various religious rituals such as Jatara, Teertham, and Gandra Deepotsavam. Devotees carry lamps on their heads in a grand procession, accompanied by traditional dances, music, and fireworks. The event attracts thousands of visitors from nearby districts and states, who come to seek blessings and fulfill their vows.

Other Festivals:Sankranti: Celebrated in January, this harvest festival is marked by traditional games, kite flying, and feasts.

Ugadi: The Telugu New Year, celebrated in March or April, involves special prayers, preparation of traditional dishes, and cultural performances.

Diwali: Known as the Festival of Lights, Diwali is celebrated with vibrant fireworks displays, lighting of lamps, and distribution of sweets.

Other Festivals: Festivals like Vinayaka Chaturthi, Dussehra, and Maha Shivratri are also celebrated with great enthusiasm, reflecting the diverse cultural fabric of the village.

=== Traditional practices ===
Religious Rituals: The village has several temples, and religious rituals are an integral part of daily life. Devotees regularly visit temples to offer prayers and participate in various religious ceremonies.

Community Gatherings: Festivals and religious events often serve as occasions for community gatherings, fostering a sense of unity and social cohesion among the villagers.

Arts and Crafts

Handicrafts: The region is known for its traditional handicrafts, including wood carving and metalwork. These crafts are often showcased during local festivals and fairs, providing a glimpse into the artistic heritage of the area.

=== Music and dance ===
Traditional Music and Dance: Music and dance are vital components of the cultural life in Kondukuduru. Traditional dance forms like Kuchipudi and folk dances are performed during festivals and special occasions. These performances are accompanied by traditional musical instruments, adding to the festive atmosphere.

=== Cuisine ===
Local Delicacies: The cuisine of Kondukuduru is predominantly vegetarian, with a focus on rice-based dishes. Popular dishes include Pulihora (tamarind rice), Pesarattu (green gram dosa), and various types of pickles. During festivals, special sweets and savories are prepared and shared among the community.

=== Community life ===
Social Harmony: The village is known for its strong sense of community and social harmony. Festivals and cultural events provide opportunities for villagers to come together, celebrate, and support each other.

Educational and Social Activities: The village has several schools and community centers that play a crucial role in promoting education and social welfare. These institutions often organize cultural programs and competitions to encourage local talent and preserve traditional arts
