= Jakkampudi Raja =

Indian politician (born 1989)

- Born: 1989 (age 36–37); Rajanagaram
- Occupation: Politician
- Political party: YSR Congress Party

Jakkampudi Raja Indravandit (born 1989) is an Indian politician from Andhra Pradesh. He won the 2019 Andhra Pradesh Legislative Assembly election on YSR Congress Party ticket from Rajanagaram Constituency in East Godavari district. He is nominated again by YSRCP to contest the Rajanagaram seat in the 2024 Andhra Pradesh Legislative Assembly Election.

== Early life and education ==
Raja was born in Rajanagaram to Jakkampudi Rammohan Rao and Vijayalakshmi. His father Jakkampudi Rammohan Rao was a three-time MLA and a former Minister of Roads and Buildings in 2004, and an excise minister later. He completed MBA from GITAM University through distance education course. He belongs to Kapu community.

== Career ==
Following in the footsteps of his father, Raja started his political journey with YSR Congress Party. Before getting elected as MLA, he served as the president of the YSRCP youth wing. He is one of the young brigade who made their debut in the Assembly. He won the 2019 Andhra Pradesh Legislative Assembly Election on YSRCP ticket from Rajanagaram Constituency defeating Pendurthi Venkatesh of TDP by a margin of 31,772 votes. He was nominated as Andhra Pradesh Kapu Corporation chairman in July 2019. In April 2024, followers of Raja, led by his brother and Godavari regional youth coordinator Jakkampudi Ganesh staged a midnight protest against the alleged remarks of JSP chief Pawan Kalyan at a public meeting in the region. Pawan Kalyan, allegedly, made derogatory remarks against the Jakkampudi family.
