= Korukonda mandal =

Korukonda Mandal
- Mandal
- Interactive map of Korukonda Mandal
- Country: India
- State: Andhra Pradesh
- District: East Godavari

Area
  - Total: 182.62 km^{2} (70.51 sq mi)
- Time zone: UTC+5:30 (IST)
- Vehicle Registration: AP05 (Former); AP39 (from 30 January 2019)

Korukonda Mandal is one of the 19 mandals in East Godavari District of Andhra Pradesh. As per census 2011, there are 18 villages. Majority of Korukonda Mandal is under the jurisdiction of Greater Rajamaendravaram Municipal Corporation (GRMC).

== Demographics ==
Korukonda Mandal has total population of 79,553 as per the Census 2011 out of which 39,620 are males while 39,933 are females and the average Sex Ratio of Korukonda Mandal is 1,008. The total literacy rate of Korukonda Mandal is 62.84%. The male literacy rate is 57.45% and the female literacy rate is 54.37%.

== Towns and villages ==
=== Villages ===
1. Bolleddupalem
2. Burugupudi
3. Butchempeta
4. Dosakayalapalle
5. Gadala
6. Gadarada
7. Jambupatnam
8. Kanupuru
9. Kapavaram
10. Korukonda
11. Koti
12. Kotikesavaram
13. Madhurapudi
14. Munagala
15. Narasapuram
16. Nidigatla
17. Raghavapuram
18. Srirangapatnam

== See also ==
- List of mandals in Andhra Pradesh
