= Rayavaram mandal =

Rayavaram Mandal
- Mandal
- Interactive Map Outlining mandal
- Country: India
- State: Andhra Pradesh
- District: East Godavari
- Time zone: UTC+5:30 (IST)

Rayavaram Mandal is one of the 22 mandals in East Godavari District of Andhra Pradesh. As per census 2011, there are 10 villages.

== Demographics ==
Rayavaram Mandal has total population of 66,456 as per the Census 2011 out of which 32,982 are males while 33,474 are females and the Average Sex Ratio of Rayavaram Mandal is 1,015. The total literacy rate of Rayavaram Mandal is 69.7%. The male literacy rate is 65.9% and the female literacy rate is 60.11%.

== Towns and villages ==
=== Villages ===
1. Chelluru
2. Kurakallapalle
3. Kurmapuram
4. Lolla
5. Machavaram
6. Nadurubada
7. Pasalapudi
8. Someswaram
9. Vedurupaka
10. Venturu

== See also ==
- List of mandals in Andhra Pradesh
