= Rajamahendravaram Urban mandal =

- Mandal
- Interactive Map Outlining mandal
- Location in Andhra Pradesh, India
- Coordinates: 16.98°N 81.78°E
- Country: India
- State: Andhra Pradesh
- District: East Godavari
- Headquarters: Rajahmundry
  - Rank: 17.49

Population (2011)
  - Total: 341,831

Languages
  - Official: Telugu
- Time zone: UTC+5:30 (IST)
- Vehicle registration: AP

Rajamahendravaram Urban mandal, is one of the 19 mandals in East Godavari of the state of Andhra Pradesh, India. It has its headquarters at Rajamahendravaram city, that covers the entire urban mandal. The mandal is surrounded by Rajamahendravaram Rural mandal and lies on the banks of Godavari River.

== Demographics ==
As of 2011 census, the mandal had a population of 341,831. The total population constitute, 168,735 males and 173,096 females —a sex ratio of 1029 females per 1000 males. 32,024 children are in the age group of 0–6 years, of which 16,261 are boys and 15,763 are girls —a ratio of 969 per 1000. The average literacy rate stands at 84.12% with 260,616 literates.

== See also ==
- List of mandals in Andhra Pradesh
