= Ramaraopet =

- Village
- Interactive map of Ramaraopet
- Location in Andhra Pradesh, India Ramaraopet (India)
- Coordinates: 16.961535°N 82.229827°E
- Country: India
- State: Andhra Pradesh
- Region: Kakinada
- District: Kakinada district

Languages
  - Official: Telugu
- Time zone: UTC+5:30 (IST)
- PIN: 533004

Ramaraopet is situated in Kakinada district in Kakinada Urban, in Andhra Pradesh State.
