= Saheb Ramrao Khandare =

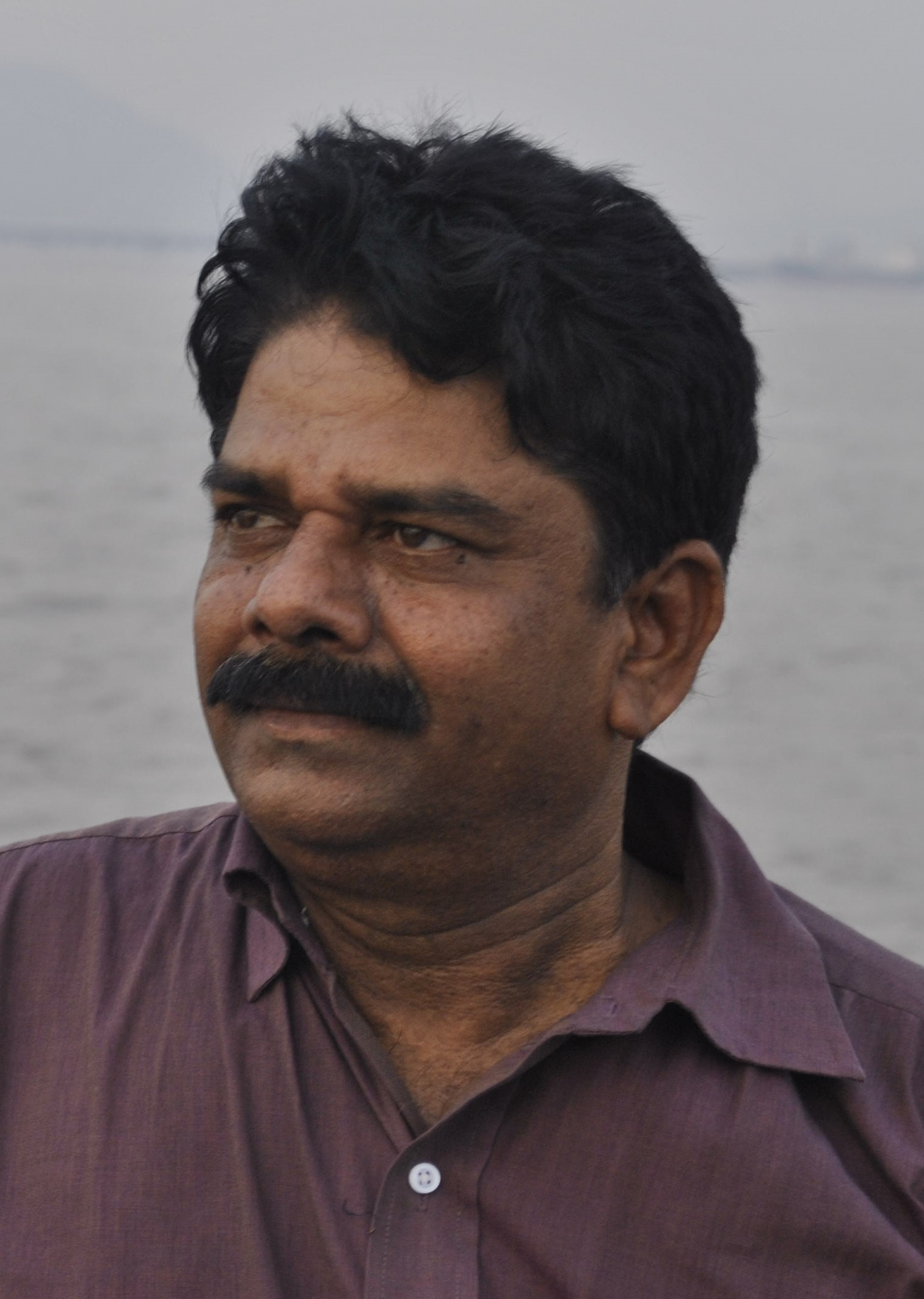
- Born: 5 July 1962 (age 64); Gaul Bar
- Occupation: Principal
- Notable work: Theory of Interdisciplinary Study

Saheb Ramrao Khandare (born 5 July 1962) is an Indian Indologist, folklorist critic and experimental poet who writes in the Marathi language.

Khandare is said to have brought consciousness techniques into Marathi drama. He introduced a new branch in history writing through his book Marathyancha Samajik Sanskrutik Ithas, i.e. socio-cultural history.

Khandare was the first to introduce the ‘Theory of Interdisciplinary Studies’ to India in 1993, and also formed a new ‘Folklorical Criticism’ for arts and literature.

Khandare received the ‘Best Literature Award’ from the Maharashtra Government the in 2002 for the book Aata Ujadel, in 2003 for the book Loksahitya Shabda ani Prayog, in 2008 for the book Marathyancha Samajik Sanskrutik Itihas, and in 2009 for the book Buddha Jatak.

Khandare was noted for his teaching skills by Maharashtra Government in 2004.

== Published work ==
=== Poetry ===
- Ratrichya Kavita (1991)

=== Plays ===
- Brain Cancer (1990)
- Aata Ujadel (2002)

=== Criticism ===
- Swad-Aswad (1988)
- Lekh Aalekh (1991)
- Aatle Aawaj (ISBN 81-89730-17-7) (2009)

=== Biography ===
- Muktai (1992)

=== Linguistics ===
- Vyawaharic Marathi (ISBN 81-87043-81-4) (2002)
- Vyawaharic Marathi-II (ISBN 81-89730-11-8) (2003)

=== Folklore Research ===
- Eka Lokkathecha Abhyas (ISBN 81-89730-12-6) (2003)
- Aaradhyanchi lokgani (ISBN 81-89730-13-4) (2003)
- Sumbran: Sankalan ani Shodh (ISBN 81-89730-14-2) (2003)
- Loksahitya Sankalan ani Shodh (2004)
- Loksahitya Shabda ani prayog (ISBN 81-7774-062-8) (2003)
- Olakha Bara (2006)
- Loknatya Parampara (ISBN 81-89730-16-9) (2009)
- Bhartiya Krushichi Loksanskruti (ISBN 978-81-905009-8-2) (2009)
- Loksahityabhyas (ISBN 978-81-89730-25-3) (2014)
- Saphar Main Jindagi (ISBN 978-81-89730-36-9) Nepali to Hindi 2022

=== Interdisciplinary Research ===
- Marathyancha Samajic Sanskritik Itihas (2008)
- Buddha Jatak Vol. 1 (ISBN 978-81-905009-6-8) (2009)
- Bhartiya Krushisanskriti (ISBN 978-81-905009-9-9) (2013)
- Sheti, Shetakari and Sharad Pawar (ISBN 978-81-89730-27-7) (2014)

=== Literary Research ===
- Shivaji Maharajancha Powada (ISBN 978-81-905009-2-0) (2008)
- Nijamkalin Marathawadi Sahitya (ISBN 81-89730-18-5) (2010)

=== Edited volumes ===
- Keshawayan (1993)
- Prachin Marathi Kavita (2002)
- Suwarnamahotsavi Maharashtra (ISBN 81-89730-10-X) (2010)

== Special Issues ==
- Lokvidya Patrica, 2014

== Extra Links ==
- http://bsvlss.com
