= Kapileswarapuram mandal =

Kapileswarapuram Mandal
- Mandal
- Interactive map of Kapileswarapuram Mandal
- Country: India
- State: Andhra Pradesh
- District: East Godavari
- Time zone: UTC+5:30 (IST)

Kapileswarapuram Mandal is one of the mandal in East Godavari district of Andhra Pradesh. As per census 2011, there are 15 villages.

== Demographics ==
Kapileswarapuram Mandal has total population of 66,809 as per the Census 2011 out of which 33,583 are males while 33,226 are females and the Average Sex Ratio of Kapileswarapuram Mandal is 989. The total literacy rate of Kapileswarapuram Mandal is 68.22%. The male literacy rate is 63.17% and the female literacy rate is 59.75%.

== Towns and villages ==
=== Villages ===
1. Danamma Marri
2. Addankivari Lanka
3. Angara
4. Kaleru
5. Kapileswarapuram
6. Korumilli
7. Machara
8. Nalluru
9. Nelaturu
10. Nidasanametta
11. Padamati Khandrika
12. Teki
13. Thatapudi
14. Vadlamuru
15. Vakatippa
16. Valluru
17. Vedurumudi

== See also ==
- List of mandals in Andhra Pradesh
