= Seethanagaram mandal =

- Mandal
- Interactive Map Outlining mandal
- Location in Andhra Pradesh, India
- Coordinates: 17.1833°N 81.7000°E
- Country: India
- State: Andhra Pradesh
- District: East Godavari

Area
  - Total: 156.06 km^{2} (60.26 sq mi)

Population (2011)
  - Total: 71,665
  - Density: 459.21/km^{2} (1,189.4/sq mi)

Languages
  - Official: Telugu
- Time zone: UTC+5:30 (IST)

Seethanagaram is one of the 19 mandals in East Godavari district of the state of Andhra Pradesh, India. Its headquarters are located at Seethanagaram. The mandal is bounded by Devipatnam mandal, Korukonda mandal, Rajahmundry (rural) mandal and a part of it lies on the banks of Godavari River. It is sub urban growth of Rajamahendravaram City.

== Demographics ==
As of 2011 census, the mandal had a population of 71,665. The total population constitute, 35,728 males and 35,937 females —a sex ratio of 1006 females per 1000 males. 7,206 children are in the age group of 0–6 years, of which 3,706 are boys and 3,500 are girls —a ratio of 944 per 1000. The average literacy rate stands at 66.62% with 42,944 literates. Raghudevapuram is the most populated village and Nallagonda is the least populated village in the mandal.

== Tourist attractions ==
Papi Hills is located near to Seethanagaram about 20km.The boat point where boats start to Papi Hills is at Purushotapatnam, Seethanagaram.

Pattiseema can be reached within 30 min about 13 Km.

== Villages ==
Seethanagaram mandal consists of 17 villages. The following are the list of villages in the mandal:

1. Bobbillanka
2. Mulakallanka
3. Mirthipadu
4. Hundeswarapuram
5. Jalimudi
6. Katavaram
7. Munikudali
8. Rajampeta
9. Vedullapalli
10. Inugantivari Peta
11. Muggulla
12. Kunavaram
13. Koti Kesavaram
14. Nallagonda
15. Rapaka
16. Raghudevapuram
17. Seethanagaram
18. Chinakondepudi
19. Nagampalle
20. Chipurapalli
21. Singavaram
22. Vangalapudi
23. Ramachandrapuram
24. Purushothapatnam
