= Anaparthi =

- Town
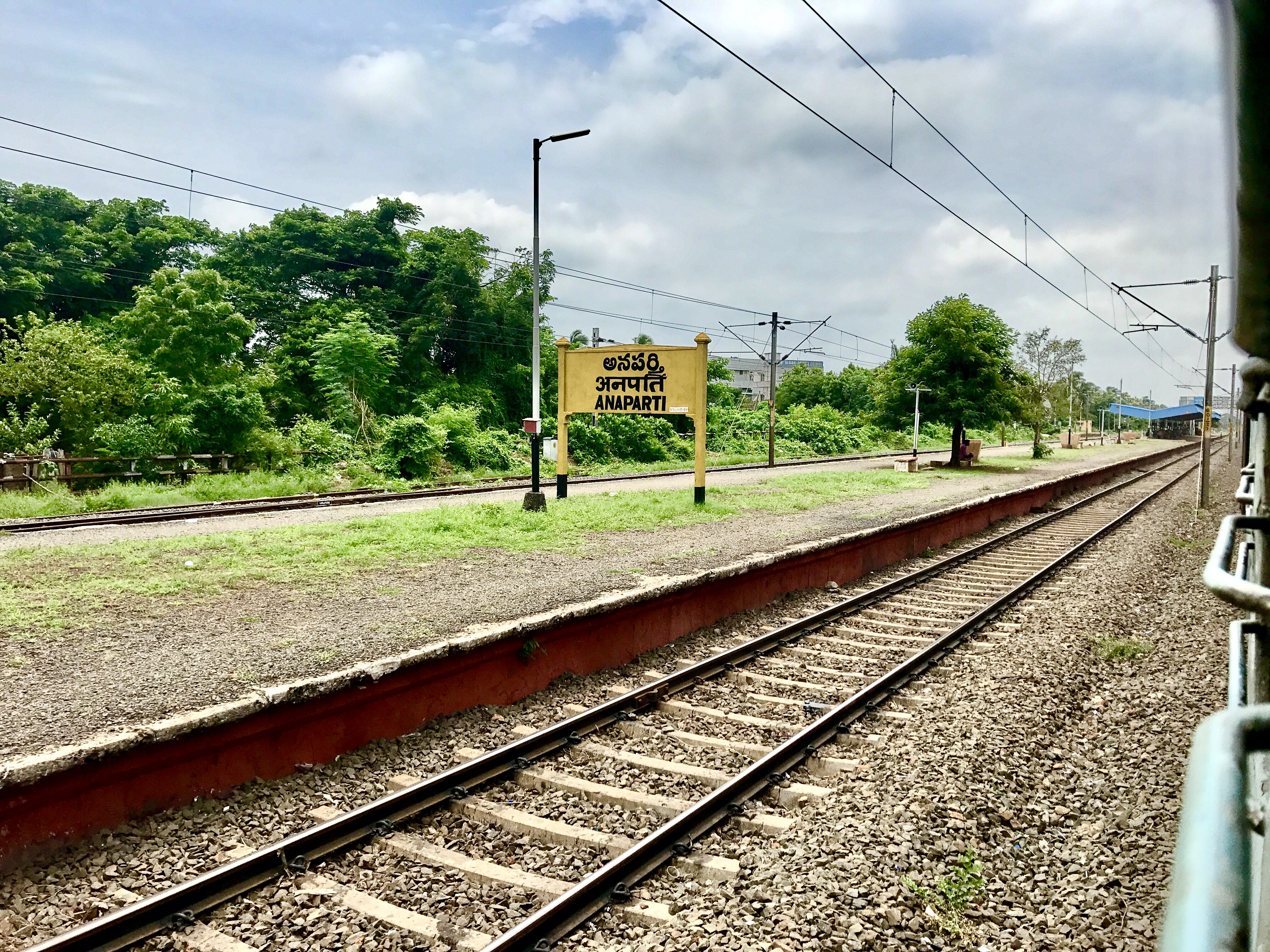
- Anaparti railway station signboard

- Location in Andhra Pradesh, India
- Coordinates: 16°56′25.42″N 81°57′29.44″E
- Country: India
- State: Andhra Pradesh
- District: East Godavari

Government
  - MLA: Sathi Suryanarayana Reddy

Area
  - Total: 10 km^{2} (3.9 sq mi)

Population (2011)
  - Total: 26,790
  - Density: 2,700/km^{2} (6,900/sq mi)

Languages
  - Official: Telugu
- Time zone: UTC+5:30 (IST)
- PIN: 533342
- Telephone code: 08857
- Vehicle Registration: AP05 (Former); AP39 (from 30 January 2019)
- Sex ratio: 1:1 ♂/♀
- Literacy: average%
- Lok Sabha constituency: Rajahmundry
- Vidhan Sabha constituency: Anaparthy

Anaparthi (formerly Anapothavaram) is a Town located in Anaparthy mandal, in East Godavari district of the Indian state of Andhra Pradesh.

== Agriculture ==
Anaparti has two canals of River Godavari waters, providing vast areas of agricultural lands. Major crops cultivated in the area include paddy, palm oil, sugarcane and groundnuts.

== Demographics ==
The local language is the Telugu language.

According to census figures, the total population of Anaparthi is 25,533, of which 12,856 are male and 12,677 are female. The total area of Anaparthi is 1807 hectares.

== Geography ==
The closest cities to Anaparthi are Rajamundry and the coast town Kakinada.

== Transport ==
The Anaparti railway station is classified as a D–category station in the Vijayawada railway division of South Central Railway zone. The station is situated between Samalkot and Rajahmundry.
