= East Godavari district =

- District of Andhra Pradesh
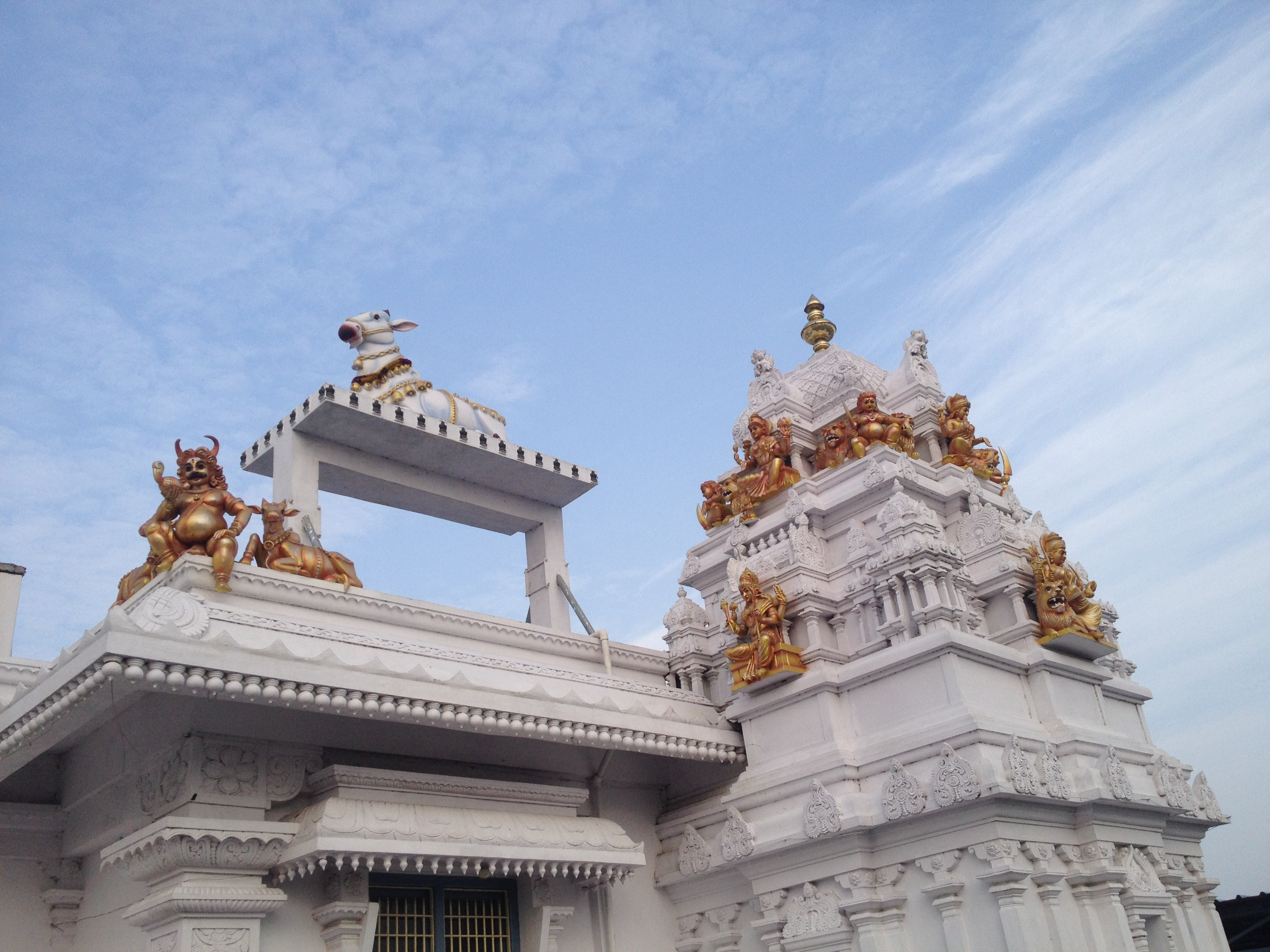
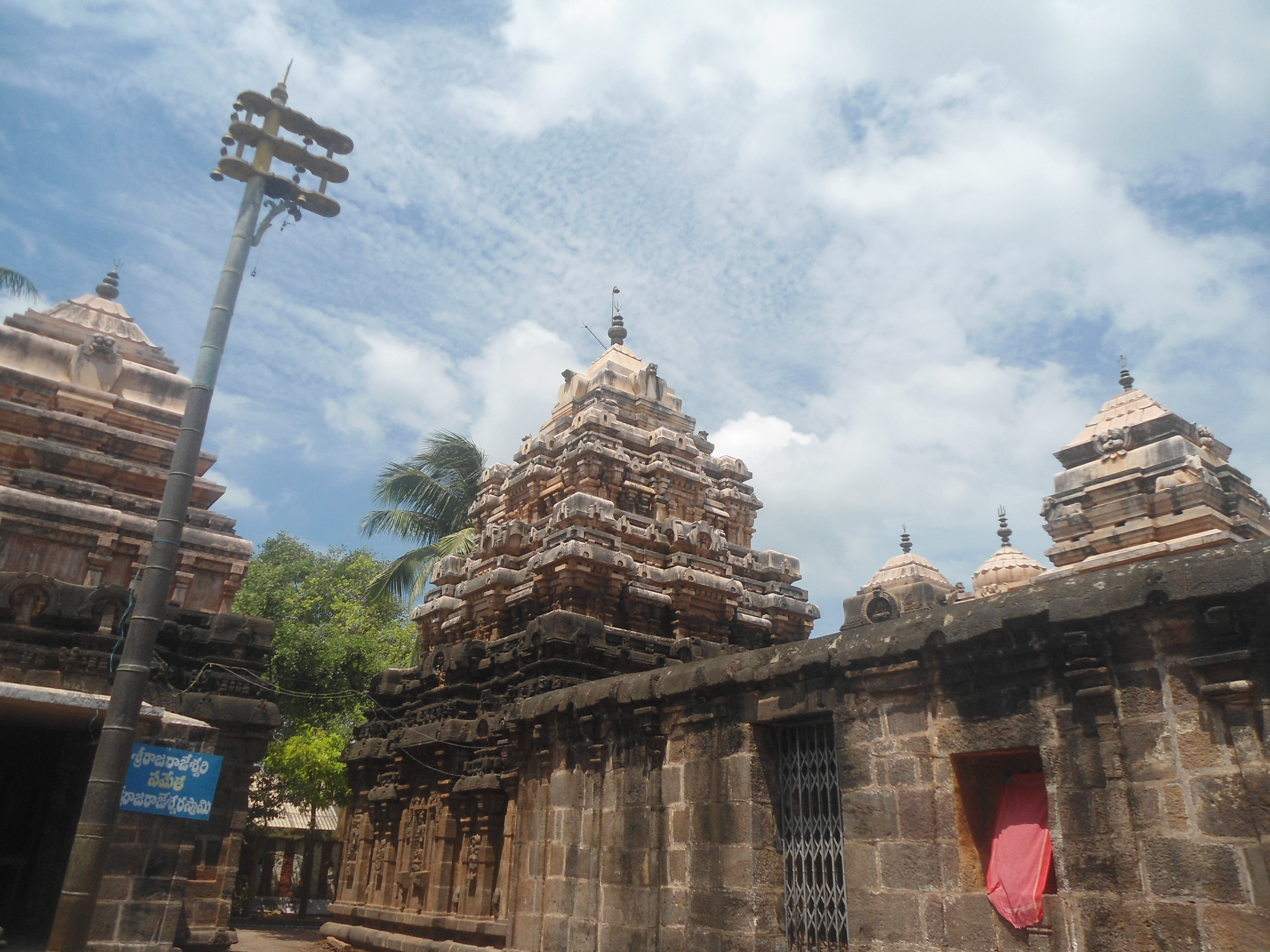
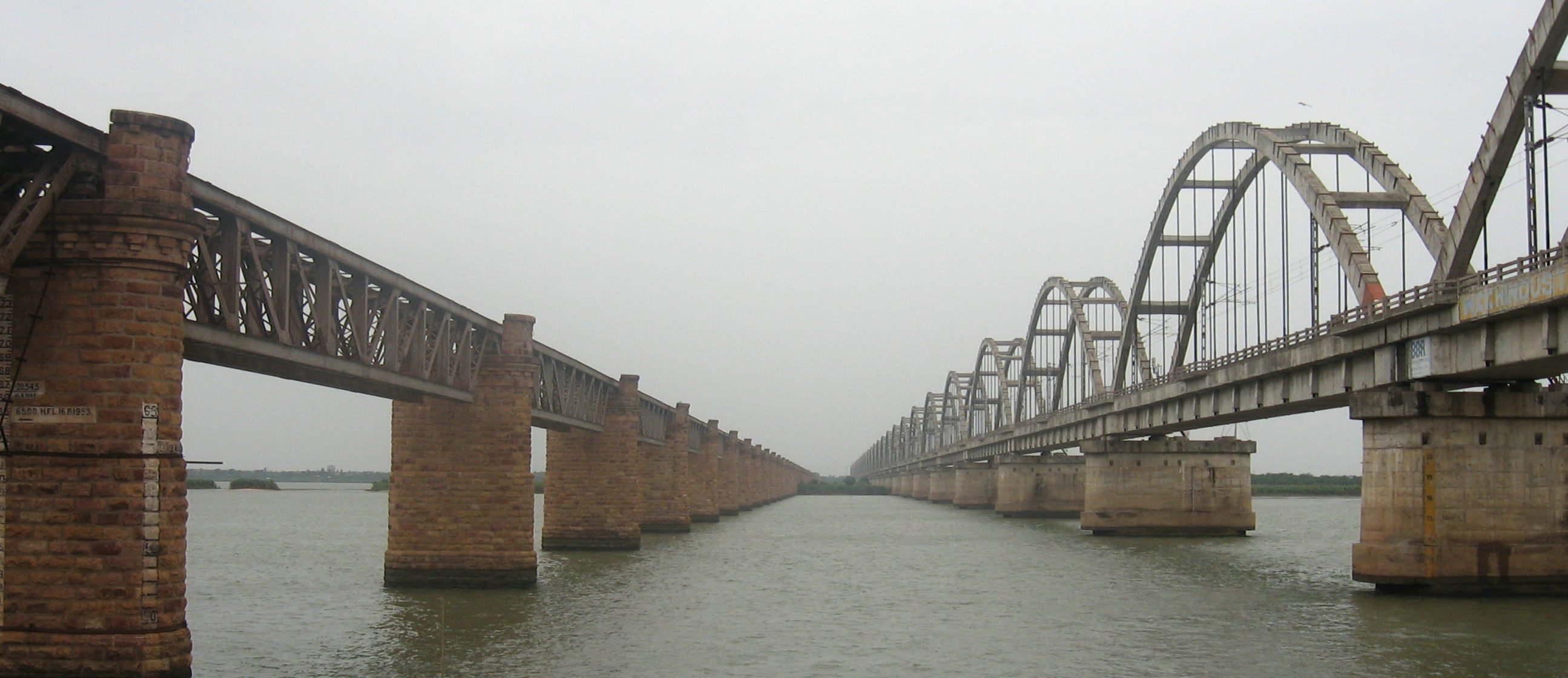
- Clockwise from top-left: Kovvur Shivalayam, Golingeshwara Temple near Biccavole, Godavari bridges near Rajamahendravaram

- Location of East Godavari district in Andhra Pradesh
- Interactive map of East Godavari district
- Coordinates: 16°59′46″N 81°48′01″E
- Country: India
- State: Andhra Pradesh
- Region: Kosta Andhra
- Headquarters: Rajamahendravaram
- Mandals: 22

Government
  - District collector: Dr K Madhavi Latha, IAS
  - Lok Sabha constituencies: Rajamahendravaram
  - Assembly constituencies: 7

Area
  - Total: 2,560.70 km^{2} (988.69 sq mi)

Population (2011)
  - Total: 1,832,332
  - Density: 715.559/km^{2} (1,853.29/sq mi)

Demographics
  - Literacy: 71.35%
  - Sex ratio: 1005
- Time zone: UTC+5:30 (IST)
- Vehicle registration: AP-05 (former); AP–39 (from 30 January 2019)
- Major highways: NH 16, NH 216, NH 516E, NH 216A, NH-365BB, NH-516D.
- District LGD code: 505
- District abbreviation: EGI
- Website: eastgodavari.ap.gov.in

East Godavari district is a district in the Coastal Andhra region of Andhra Pradesh, India. Its district headquarters is at Rajamahendravaram.

== Geography ==
This district is surrounded by:

- North East: Polavaram district
- North West: Eluru district
- South: Dr. B. R. Ambedkar Konaseema district
- South East: Kakinada district
- South West: West Godavari district.

== History ==
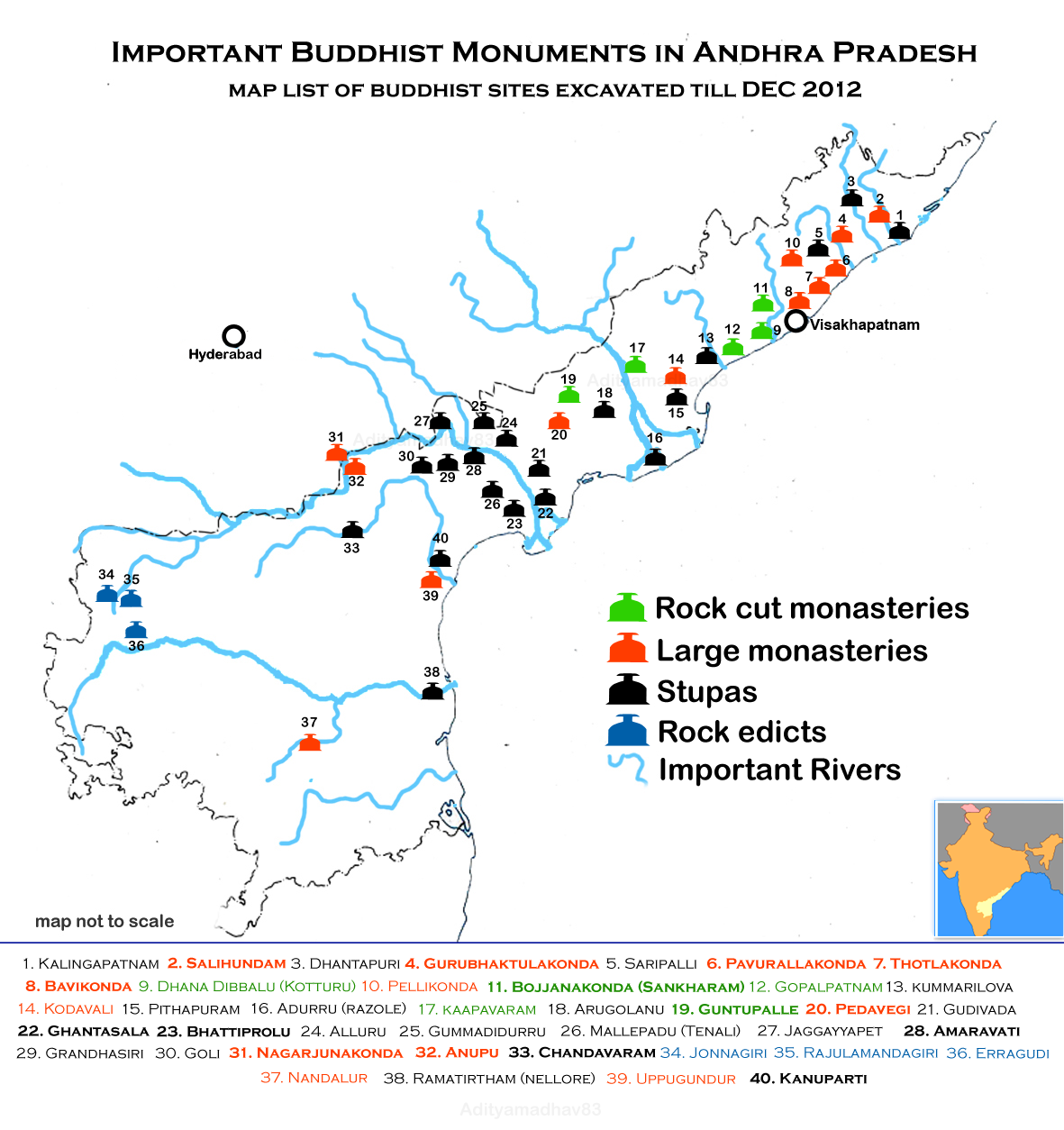
East Godavari has many important Buddhist sites.

=== Early kingdoms ===
The district, like the rest of the Deccan, was under the Nandas and Mauryas in its early history. After the fall of the Mauryan Empire, the district was under the Satavahanas until the 3rd century under the famous poet king Haala. Coins found during excavations have revealed the rule of Gautamiputra Satakarni, Vaasisthi-puttra Pulumaavi and Yajna Sri Satakarni. Gupta emperor Samudragupta invaded during the rule of both Pishtapura and Avamukta in the district in 350 AD Samudragupta's invasion was followed by the rule of the Mathara dynasty from 375 to 500. The earliest known ruler of the dynasty was Saktivarman.

The district passed into the hands of Vishnukundinas during the rule of Vikramendra Varma I during the 5th century. The records indicate that their domain extended over Visakhapatnam, West Godavari, Krishna and Guntur districts in addition to East Godavari. Indra Bhattaraka defeated the rulers of Vasistha Kula and re-established Vihsnukundina authority, but was shortly defeated by Kalinga armies. Indra Bhattaraka was followed to the throne by a few others, including Madhava Varma III and Manchana Bhattaraka, who tried to restore their kingdom. Madhava Varma III was the last important ruler of this family.

=== Chalukyas and Cholas ===
The Pulakesi II of Badami Chalukyas and his brother Kubja Vishnu Vardhana acquired Pishtapura in the 7th century. The Eastern Chalukya dynasty, founded by Kubja Vishnu Vardhana, ruled at first form Pishtapura, then from Vengi, and later from Rajamahendravaram. Many rulers held sway over the kingdom and their history is at times largely a record of disputes over succession. Chalukya Bhima I of this dynasty built a Shiva temple at Draksha Ramam. Jata Choda Bhima of PedaKallu (Kurnool District) killed Daanaarnava of this dynasty and occupied Vengi in 973 AD Daanaarnava's two sons, Sakti Varma I and Vimala Aditya, fled from the kingdom and took refuge in the court of the Chola king Rajaraja Chola I. Rajaraja invaded Vengi on behalf of the sons of Daanaarnava and killed Jata Choda Bhima. Satya Raya of the Western Chalukyas of Kalyani did not like the Chola influence in Vengi and the area witnessed many wars between the Cholas and Chalukyas. After the death of Vijaya Aditya VII in 175 AD, the Eastern Chalukya dynasty came to an end.

Kulottunga Chola I (Rajendra Chalukya), a rival of Vijay Aditya VII, fought along the sides of Cholas and established the Chalukya Cholas province. The district along with the rest of the Vengi kingdom became part of their empire. Major portions of the district were under Velanati Chodas, trustworthy chieftains to his. Rulers of this dynasty included Gonka I, Rajendra Choda I, Gonka II and Rajendra Choda II. Vikram Aditya vii of Western Chalukyas occupied this region for a short period, but it was recovered by Chalukya Cholas and Velanati Chodas. Velanati chiefs also suppressed rebellions from Haihayas of Kona, Gonka II and Rudra of the Kakatiya dynasty.

=== Kakatiyas and Delhi Sultanate ===
Inscriptions at this region including the ones at Draksha Ramam in 13th-century throw light on their history. Prola II of the Kakatiya dynasty declared independence from the western Chalukyas and became a subject of Chalukya Cholas. His son Rudra obtained the Godavari delta as a gift from the Rajaraja II of Chalukya Cholas. Rudra's authority over the Godavari delta was challenged by the Velanadu Chodas. The Velanati king Rajendra Choda II sent an army under his minister Davana Preggada against Rudra. Rudra was succeeded by his younger brother Mahadeva who died in a conflict with the Yadavas of Devagiri. His son Ganapati succeeded to the Kakatiya throne. Ganapati defeated Kalinga armies on the north, Pandyas of Madura and Cholas with the help of Nellooru Chodas. The Kakatiya power remained undisturbed in the Godavari region throughout the reign of Ganapati and her daughter Rudrama devi. Pratapa Rudra ascended the throne in 1295 and faced many attacks from Sultans of Delhi. After his defeat by Muhammad bin Tughluq in 1323, the district came under the rule of the Delhi Sultanate. Muhammad-bin-Tughluq divided South India into five provinces and appointed governors.

=== Nayakas, Reddi, Telagas (Kapus) and other kingdoms ===
Delhi sultans faced rebellions from the confederacy of local chiefs under the authority of Prolaya of the Musunuri Nayaks clan. The Reddis of Addanki, Koppula Telagas of Pithapuram and the Recharla Velamas of Rachakonda actively helped him. Warangal was liberated and Telugu land enjoyed freedom for fifty years. Musunuri Kapaya Nayaka appointed his relatives Toyyeti Anavota Nayaka and Mummadi Nayaka (Korukonda) as governors in Godavari region. Mummadi Nayaka married the niece of Kapaya Nayaka. Mummadi Nayaka lived until 1388. He had three sons who ruled for a period of 40 years and later they were reduced to submission by the Reddis of Kondaveedu and their principality was merged in the kingdom of Kondaveedu. Subsequently, Narasimha Deva IV of Kalinga succeeded in conquering this region, but was repulsed by Anavota Reddi of Rajamahendravaram. He was succeeded by Anavema Reddi and Kumaragiri of the same dynasty.

Kumaragiri fought many wars with the Recharlas of Rachakonda and the Kalinga rulers. He sent his general Kataya Vema along with Prince Anavota to conquer the eastern region. This resulted in the annexation of a large tract in the north as far as Simhachalam. The newly acquired territory was annexed to the Reddi Kingdom and constituted into a separate province called the eastern kingdom. Prince Anavota ruled this province with Raja-Mahendra-Varam as his capital. He died a premature death around 1395 and Kataya Vema, the general and brother-in-law of Kumara Giri, was given Raja Mahendra Rajya in appreciation of the services rendered by him to the State. Kataya Vema's departure to Raja Mahendra Varam led to the seizure of the throne of Kondaveedu by force by Peda Komati Vema.

Peda Komati Vema's authority was defined by Kataya Vema. Kataya Vema was also involved in a conflict with Eruva chief Annadeva Choda, who managed to occupy a large portion of the Raja Mahendra Rajya. He was, however, defeated and driven back by Kataya Vema. Later, Kataya Vema died in a battle with Anna Deva Choda. After his death, Allada Reddi placed Kataya Vemas' son Komaragiri on the throne of Rajamahendravaram and ruled the kingdom as his regent. Komarigiri died a premature death. Allada Reddi ruled this region until his death in 1420. About 1423, the Vijayanagara ruler Deva Raya II defeated Veera Bhadra, who was then ruling this kingdom and reduced it to subjection.

After the death of Kapilendra Deva Gajapati in 1466, there was a fight between his sons Hamveera Deva and Purushottama Deva for succession. Hamveera succeeded in occupying the throne with the help of Bahmanis but he could not retain it for long. Purushottama overthrew Hamveera and tried to reconquer Rajamahendravaram and other places. But Muhammad Shah III led the forces to Rajamahendravaram. This battle, however, ended with the conclusion of a peace treaty. After the death of Muhammad Shah III, Purushottama Gajapati overran the whole of the Godavari-Krishna do-ab and drove the Bahmani forces as far south as Kondaveedu. Purushottama was succeeded by his son Pratapa Rudra. The Vijayanagar monarch Krishnadevaraya invaded his kingdom and brought Rajamahendravaram under subjugation. However, a treaty was concluded wherein Pratapa Rudra agreed to give his daughter in marriage to Krishna Deva Raya in return of the territory north of the Krishna conquered by Krishna Deva Raya.

=== Muslim kingdoms ===
Taking advantage of the disturbed conditions, the Qutab Shahi ruler of Golkonda, Sultan Quli Qutab Shah, invaded the coastal region and took possession of Rajamahendravaram and the neighboring kingdoms. Sultan Quli was murdered and he was succeeded to the throne by his son Jamshid Qutab Shah and then by his grandson Subhan Qutab Shah. During his reign, Ibrahim Qutab Shah had to ward off challenges from Shitab Khan and Vidyadhar. The last ruler of this dynasty was Abdul Hasan Tana Shah, who ruled from 1672 to 1687.

Aurangzeb conquered the sultanate of Golaconda in 1687, and Golaconda, including East Godavari, became one of the twenty-two provinces of the Mughal Empire. The Nizam-ul-Mulk (viceroy of Golaconda) looked after the administration through military officers called Fauzdars. Pusapati Ananda Gajapati Raju, the new Raja of Vizianagaram, invited the French to occupy the Northern Circars. The tussle that ensued between the French and the English ended with the French losing all possessions in Northern Circars except Yanam.

Salabat Jung was subsequently deposed by his brother Nizam Ali Khan, who leased out Rajamahendravaram and Chicacole to Hasan Ali Khan. Lord Robert Clive, entered into negotiations with the Mughal Emperor Shah Alam and obtained a firmana ceding the Northern Circars to the British East India Company in August 1765, but it was kept a secret until March 1766. The fort of Kondapalli was seized by the British, and General Cillaud was sent to Machilipatnam to undertake military operations, if necessary. The Nizam also made brisk preparations for war. War was prevented by the signing of a treaty on 12 November 1766 by which the company, in return for occupying the Circars, undertook to maintain troops for the Nizam's assistance.

=== British rule (1768–1947) ===
By a second treaty, signed on 1 March 1768 the Nizam acknowledged the validity of Shah Alam's grant and resigned the Circars to the company, receiving as a mark of friendship an annuity of 50,000. Finally, in 1823, the claims of the Nizam over the Northern Circars were bought outright by the company, and they became a British possession.

In the Madras Presidency, the District of Rajamahendravaram was created in 1823. It was reorganised in 1859 and was bifurcated into Godavari and Krishna districts. During British rule, Rajamahendravaram was the headquarters of Godavari District, which was further bifurcated into East Godavari and West Godavari districts in 1925. When the Godavari district was divided, Kakinada became the headquarters of East Godavari and Eluru became headquarters of West Godavari.

In 1839 during the British Raj, a colossal cyclone struck Coringa and toppled buildings, therefore over 300,000 people were killed.

=== Post-independence ===
After India's independence in 1947, the former Madras Presidency of British India became India's Madras State. In 1953, the northern districts of Madras state, including the Godavari district, became the new state of Andhra. Yanam was relinquished by the French in 1954, but one condition of the cession treaty was the retention of the district's separate and distinct identity, which also applied to the other South Indian enclaves constituting today's Puducherry state.

In November 1956, Andhra Pradesh was formed by merging Andhra State with the Telugu-speaking areas of the Hyderabad State. In 1959, the Bhadrachalam revenue division, consisting of Bhadrachalam and Naguru Taluqas (2 Taluqas in 1959 but later subdivided into Wajedu, Venkatapruram, Charla, Dummugudem, Bhadrachalam, Nellipaka, Chinturu, Kunavaram, and Vara Rama Chandra Puram Mandals) of the East Godavari district were merged into the Khammam district. After June 2014's reorganisation and division of Andhra Pradesh, only the mandals of Bhadrachalam (with the exception of Bhadrachalam Temple), Nellipaka, Chinturu, Kunavaram and Vara Rama Chandra Puram were re-added back to the East Godavari district.

== Geography and climate ==
Before bifurcation, East Godavari occupied an area of 12,805 square kilometres (4,944 sq mi), comparatively equivalent to Indonesia's Sumba Island.

The district after reorganisation is bordered by Eluru district on the north and northwest, Polavaram district to the north, Kakinada district to the east and Konaseema and West Godavari districts to the south. The topography consists of fertile plains throughout the district. The plains are drained by Godavari River, which flows through the center of the district, and its landscape is filled with evergreen paddy fields all along the delta. It is the largest producer of Paddy in whole of Andhra Pradesh. The temperature remains humid for most of the months as it is located in the coastal belt. This district is referred as the green belt of Andhra due to its greenery spread all around.

== Demographics ==
According to the 2011 census East Godavari has a population of 5,154,296. This gives it a ranking of 19th in India (out of a total of 640 districts) and 1st in the state. The district has a population density of 477 inhabitants per square kilometre (1,240/sq mi). Its population growth rate over the decade 2001–2011 was 5.1%. East Godavari has a sex ratio of 1005 females for every 1000 males, and a literacy rate of 71.35%.

East Godavari has a total population of 5,151,549; 2,569,419 and 2,582,130 male and female respectively. There was a change of 5.10 percent in the population compared to population as per 2001 census. The census data states a density of 477 in 2011 compared to 454 in 2001. Average literacy rate of East Godavari in 2011 was 71.35% compared to 65.48% in 2001. On a gender basis, male and female literacy was 74.91% and 67.82% respectively. With regards to sex ratio in East Godavari, it stood at 1005 per 1000 males compared to the 2001 census figure of 993. The average national sex ratio in India is 940 as per the 2011 census.

There were total 492,446 children under the age of 0–6 against 613,490 of 2001 census. Of total 492,446 male and female were 250,086 and 242,360 respectively. The child sex ratio as per census 2011 was 969 compared to 978 in 2001. In 2011, children under 0-6 formed 9.56% of East Godavari compared to 12.52% in 2001.

Religions in East Godavari district (2011)
Religion	Percent
Hinduism	95.63%
Islam	2.43%
Christianity	1.62%
Other or not stated	0.32%
Distribution of religions

After reorganization in 2025, the district had a population of 1,935,085, of which 616,412 (31.85%) lived in urban areas. East Godavari district had a sex ratio of 1012 females per 1000 males. Scheduled Castes and Scheduled Tribes made up 407,831 (21.08%) and 21,677 (1.12%) of the population respectively.

Languages of East Godavari district (2011)
1. Telugu (97.45%)
2. Urdu (1.79%)
3. Others (0.76%)

At the time of the 2011 census, 97.45% of the population spoke Telugu and 1.79% Urdu as their first language.

=== Household indicators ===
In 2007–2008 the International Institute for Population Sciences interviewed 1019 households in 38 villages across the district. They found that 92.5% had access to electricity, 96.7% had drinking water, 50.4% toilet facilities, and 30.9% lived in a pucca (permanent) home. 28.6% of girls wed before the legal age of 18 and 79% of interviewees carried a BPL card.

Historical population
Year	Pop.	±% p.a.
1901	1,339,029	—
1911	1,511,222	+1.22%
1921	1,536,868	+0.17%
1931	1,756,747	+1.35%
1941	1,976,743	+1.19%
1951	2,301,822	+1.53%
1961	2,608,375	+1.26%
1971	3,087,262	+1.70%
1981	3,701,040	+1.83%
1991	4,541,222	+2.07%
2001	4,901,420	+0.77%
2011	5,154,296	+0.50%

== Administrative divisions ==
The district has two revenue divisions namely, Rajamahendravaram and Kovvur with 22 mandals.

=== Mandals ===
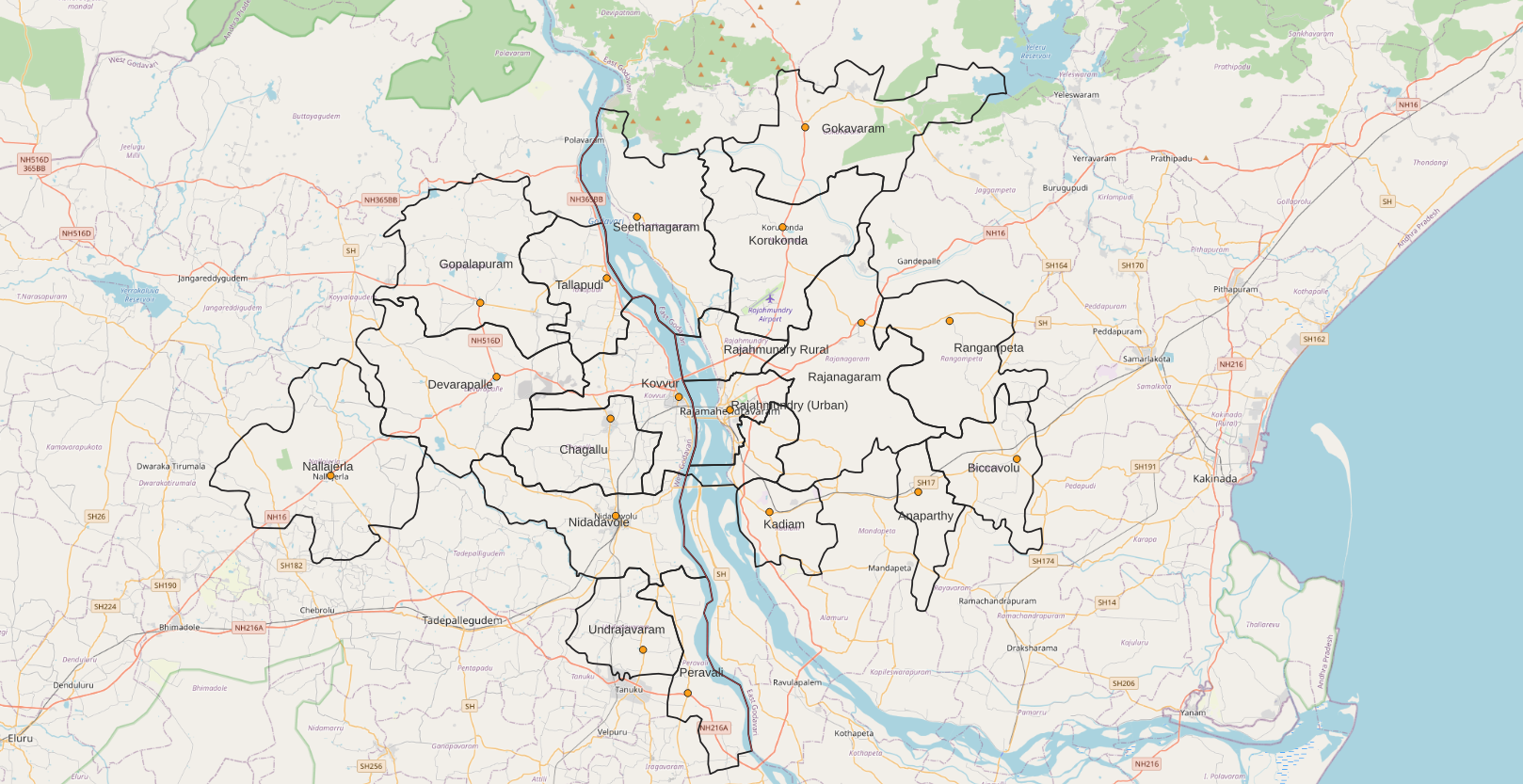
Satellite view of East Godavari District Mandals

East Godavari has the following mandals:

1. Kovvur Division
  1. Chagallu
  2. Devarapalle
  3. Gopalapuram
  4. Kovvur
  5. Nallajerla
  6. Nidadavolu
  7. Peravali
  8. Tallapudi
  9. Undrajavaram
2. Rajamahendravaram Division
  1. Anaparthi
  2. Biccavolu
  3. Gokavaram
  4. Kadiam
  5. Kapileswarapuram
  6. Korukonda
  7. Mandapeta
  8. Rajamahendravaram Rural
  9. Rajamahendravaram Urban
  10. Rajanagaram
  11. Rangampeta
  12. Rayavaram
  13. Seethanagaram

== Parliament segment ==
- Rajamahendravaram
- Amalapuram(Partially)

== Assembly segments ==
Rajamahendravaram Lok Sabha constituency presently comprises the following Legislative Assembly segments:

Constituency number	Name	Reserved for (SC/ST/None)	Parliament
40	Anaparthy	None	Rajamahendravaram
49	Rajanagaram	None	Rajamahendravaram
50	Rajamahendravaram City	None	Rajamahendravaram
51	Rajamahendravaram Rural	None	Rajamahendravaram
54	Kovvur	SC	Rajamahendravaram
55	Nidadavole	None	Rajamahendravaram
66	Gopalapuram	SC	Rajamahendravaram
48	Mandapeta	None	Amalapuram

=== Erstwhile Talukas ===
Before the formation of Mandals, administration was done through the Taluka system. The erstwhile Talukas in the district are given below.

In 1978, the number of Talukas in East Godavari district was increased from 14 to 19. Later, in 1985, these 19 Talukas were divided into 60 Mandals.

In 2014, as per the Polavaram Ordinance, 4 Mandals from Telangana were merged with East Godavari District. Thus, the number of Mandals increased to 64.

S.No.	Talukas in East Godavari in 1971	Newly formed talukas in East Godavari in 1978	Newly formed mandals in 1985
1	Kakinada	Kakinada	Kakinada Urban, Kakinada Rural, Samarlakota, Pedapudi,
1	Kakinada	Tallarevu [15]	Tallarevu, Karapa, Kajuluru,
2	Amalapuram	Amalapuram	Amalapuram, Ambajipeta, Ainavilli, Uppalaguptam, Allavaram,
3	Mummidivaram	Mummidivaram	Mummidivaram, I.Polavaram, Katrenikona,
4	Razole	Razole	Razole, Sakhinetipalli, Malikipuram
5	Kothapeta	Kothapeta	Kothapeta, Atreyapuram, Ravulapalem,
5	Kothapeta	P. Gannavaram [16]	P. Gannavaram, Mamidikuduru
6	Mandapeta	Mandapeta	Alamur, Mandapeta, Kapileswarapuram
7	Ramachandrapuram	Ramachandrapuram	Ramachandrapuram, Pamarru,
8	Rajamahendravaram	Rajamahendravaram	Rajamahendravaram Urban, Rajamahendravaram Rural, Rajanagaram, Kadiam
8	Rajamahendravaram	Korukonda [17]	Korukonda, Seethanagaram, Gokavaram,
9	Rampachodavaram	Rampachodavaram	Rampachodavaram, Maredumilli, Devipatnam,
9	Rampachodavaram	Rayavaram [18]	Anaparthy, Rayavaram, Biccavolu,
10	Yellavaram	Yellavaram	Yellavaram, Addateegala, Y.Ramavaram, Rajavommangi, Gangavaram,
11	Peddapuram	Peddapuram	Peddapuram, Kirlampudi,
11	Peddapuram	Rangampeta [19]	Rangampeta, Jaggampeta, Gandepalle,
12	Prathipadu	Prathipadu	Prathipadu, Kotananduru, Shankavaram, Prathipadu, Yeleswaram
13	Tuni	Tuni	Tuni, Thondangi
14	Pithapuram	Pithapuram	Pithapuram, Gollaprolu, Kothapalle

== Cities and towns ==
Largest cities or towns in East Godavari district As per the 2011 Census
Rank		Division	Pop.
1	Rajamahendravaram	Rajamahendravaram Division	476,873
2	Mandapeta	Rajamahendravaram Division	65,406
3	Nidadavolu	Kovvur division	43,809
4	Kovvur	Kovvur Division	39,667
5	Anaparthi	Rajamahendravaram Division	26,790
6	Rayavaram	Rajamahendravaram Division	17,361
7	Nallajerla	Kovvur Division	13,457
8	·	·	·
9	·	·	·
10	·	·	·

=== Villages ===
- Bhimakrosupalem
- Kondukuduru
- Mutyalapalem
- Pasalapudi
- Ramaraopet
- Thammavaram
- Biccavole

== Culture ==
The culture of East Godavari and West Godavari districts is a rich traditional one in all parts of the district and reflects the true culture of Andhra Pradesh. It is known for Veda-pandits, the Godavari River and the hospitality of the people. Rajamahendravaram city is known as the "Cultural Capital of Andhra Pradesh". Durga Cinetone is the first South Indian film studio constructed in the city of Rajamahendravaram. The government of Andhra Pradesh is constructing film studios in Kakinada and Rajamahendravaram cities on PPP mode. East Godavari has produced several stalwarts in an area of culture, music, art, and cinema.

== Economy ==
Agriculture and its allied activities is the backbone of East Godavari district's economy. Rajamahendravaram is a major business centre and Kakinada are the major industrial zone. It is the largest producer of paddy and tender coconuts in Andhra Pradesh. The gross district domestic product (GDDP) of East Godavari is ₹522.94 billion (US$5.6 billion) and it contributes 10% to the Gross State Domestic Product (GSDP). For the FY 2013–14, the per capita income at current prices was ₹78,255 (US$840). The primary, secondary and tertiary sectors of the district contribute ₹160.93 billion (US$1.7 billion), ₹108.57 billion (US$1.2 billion) and ₹253.43 billion (US$2.7 billion) respectively. The major products contributing to the GVA of the district from agriculture and allied services are, paddy, sugarcane, betel leaves, coconut, milk, meat and fisheries. The GVA to the industrial and service sector is contributed from construction, electricity, manufacturing, unorganised trade and transport.

== Floriculture ==
East Godavari is also famous for flowers. Various varieties of flowers are cultivated here. Nurseries here are spread more than 1,400 hectares (3,500 acres) in Kadiam, Rajamahendravaram Rural Mandals in Rajamahendravaram. Floriculture is expanding to Mandapeta, Alamuru, Atreyapuram, and Ravulapalem mandals. Floriculture Institute and Research Centre is in construction at Vemagiri in Rajamahendravaram. The government is trying to export these flowers from Rajamahendravaram Airport through cargo planes.

== Transport ==
Rajamahendravaram Railway station is a major station in the district

=== Roadways ===
The total road length of state highways in the district is 1,271 km (790 mi). The total rail network of the district is 171.34 km (106.47 mi). The National Highway 16 connecting Chennai and Howrah passes through Tuni, Rajamahendravaram. NH 216 connects Kakinada with Ongole via Yanam, Mummidivaram, Amalapuram, Razole, Narasapuram. The National Highway NH-516E connects Rajamahendravaram with Vizianagaram via Rampachodavaram, Addateegala, Rajavommangi. The National Highway NH-216A connects Rajamahendravaram with Gundugolanu near Eluru via Ravulapalem, Tanuku, Tadepalligudem. National Highways NH-365BB, NH-516D connects Rajamahendravaram with Suryapet in Telangana via Jangareddygudem, Aswaraopeta, Khammam. ADB (Asian Development Bank) Road and SH-40 (Canal Road) connect Rajamahendravaram and Kakinada. Rajamahendravaram–Kakinada Canal Road is being developed on PPP (Public Private Partnership) mode. NHAI is constructing Kakinada-Annavaram Highway along the coast under Sagaramala Project. SH-41 connects Rajamahendravaram with Chinturu, Bhadrachalam, Malkangiri, Jagdalpur.

=== Railways ===
Rajamahendravaram, Dwarapudi, Anaparti, Samalkot Junction, Pithapuram, Annavaram, Tuni, and Kakinada Town are the Major Railway stations in the district. The Chennai to Howrah rail line also passes through this district. Pithapuram-Kakinada, Kotipalli-Narsapur, 2nd lane on Godavari Arch Bridge, Kovvur-Bhadrachalam, Rajamahendravaram–Raipur railway lines are important railway projects in district. Indian Railway Department is developing Kakinada, Rajamahendravaram Railway Stations commercially like construction of malls, multiplexes, hotels, lounges, parks, new platforms.

=== Airways ===
Rajahmundry Airport, situated at Rajamahendravaram. The airport's runway is the biggest runway in the state. People here are requesting to develop this airport as an international airport. The state government is very keen in developing the airport as an international airport. The government is constructing IAF base in this airport. This airport plays a crucial role in the economy of the Godavari districts. The government of Andhra Pradesh is keen in exporting flowers through this airport from nurseries in Kadiam mandal in Rajamahendravaram and agricultural products from the district. Heli tourism has been introduced in the airport to see tourist places in both the Godavari districts. This airport is used by Oil Companies like ONGC, GAIL, IOCL, Reliance etc. It is playing major role in industrialisation of Godavari districts.

=== Waterways ===
National Waterway 4 was declared on 24 November 2008, which connects the Indian states of Andhra Pradesh, Tamil Nadu, and the union territory of Puducherry. It passes through Kakinada, Rajamahendravaram, Tadepalligudem, Eluru, Puducherry and also part of Krishna and Godavari rivers. It is being developed by Inland Waterways Authority of India. APTDC and other private agencies's boats and launches are available daily from Pushakar Ghat to Papikondalu and Bhadrachalam. Kakinada Port is a major port. GMR is constructing new commercial port at Kona area in Thondangi mandal of Kakinada which consists of 1200acre land.

== Education ==
The primary and secondary school education is imparted by government, aided and private schools, under the School Education Department of the state. As per the school information report for the academic year 2015–16, there are a total of 5,986 schools. They include, 29 government, 3,452 mandal and zilla parishads, 1 residential, 1688 private, 2 model, 12 Kasturba Gandhi Balika Vidyalaya (KGBV), 285 municipal and 517 other types of schools. The total number of students enrolled in primary, upper primary and high schools of the district are 722,123.

The district has universities located at Rajamahendravaram such as Adikavi Nannaya University, Potti Sreeramulu Telugu University, Acharya N. G. Ranga Agricultural University. There are numerous educational institutes with Jawaharlal Nehru Technological University in Kakinada, District Institute of Education and Training (DIET) in Rajamahendravaram, established in 1989 for the benefit of teacher trainees and in-service teachers. There are many educational institutions that provide education in different fields such as Engineering, Medical, Law, Pharmacy, Polytechnic and Postgraduate colleges etc. Some of the notable universities, colleges are Rangaraya Medical College in Kakinada and Government Pithapuram Rajah College, Kakinada.

National Center for Disease Control (NCDC), Central Tobacco Research Institute (CTRI), National Academy of Constructions are established in Rajamahendravaram.

Central Floriculture Research Centre and Institute is in construction at Vemagiri in Rajamahendravaram. Science City is being established at Kakinada, Rajamahendravaram.

After the Reorganization of Andhra Pradesh State the following institutes are sanctioned for district:

1. Indian Institute of Foreign Trade (IIFT), Kakinada
2. Indian Institute of Packaging (IIP), Kakinada
3. National Institute of Drama (NID), Rajamahendravaram
4. National Civil Aviation Academy, Rajamahendravaram
5. AP State Forest Academy, Rajamahendravaram

== Tourism ==
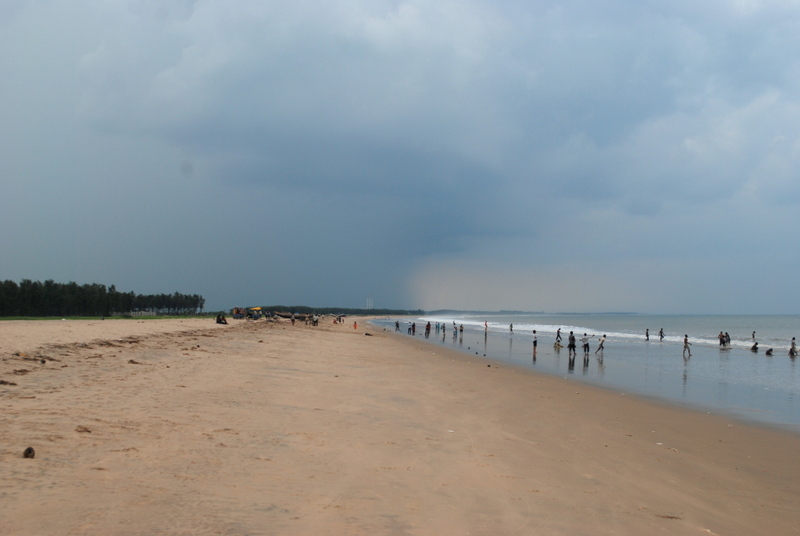
Vakalapudi beach at Kakinada

East Godavari has many places worth visiting, such as temples and nurseries.

- Historical temples are located at:
  - Someswaram
  - Amalapuram
  - Annavaram
  - Antarvedi
  - Draksharamam
  - Kotipalli
  - Pithapuram
  - Rajamahendravaram
  - Samarlakota
- Coringa Wildlife Sanctuary
- NTR Beach
- Hope Island

are located in Kakinada.

- Kadiam Mandal in Rajamahendravaram is the location of many plant nurseries.
- Sir Arthur Cotton Museum
- Dowleswaram Barrage
- Havelock Bridge

are located at Rajamahendravaram.

- Ecotourism projects are located at:
  - Maredumilli
  - Papikondalu
  - Rampa
  - Tuni.
- Talupulamma lova is a temple in East Godavari.
- The government of Andhra Pradesh is keen on developing Rajamahendravaram Airport as an international airport, so that the two Godavari districts get a major boost in tourism.
- Polavaram Project is another tourist place.

== People from East Godavari district ==
- S. B. P. Pattabhirama Rao, industrialist, politician, zamindar of Kapileswarpuram
- Sukumar Bandreddi, Indian film director, producer and screenwriter
- Duvvuri Venkata Ramana Shastri, Telugu - Sanskrit scholar

== See also ==
- List of districts in India
