= Eluru =

Eluru Helapuri
- Municipal Corporation
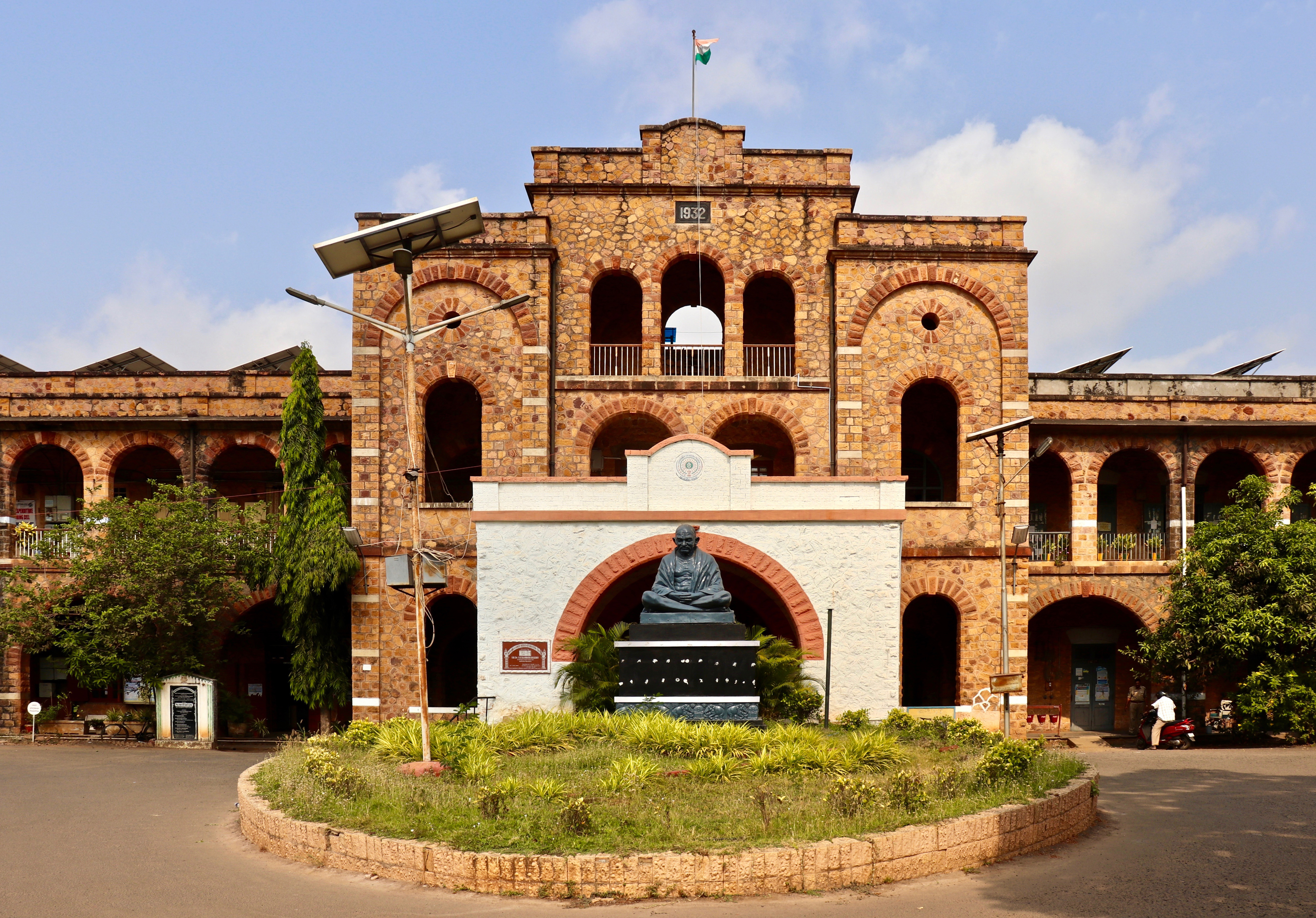
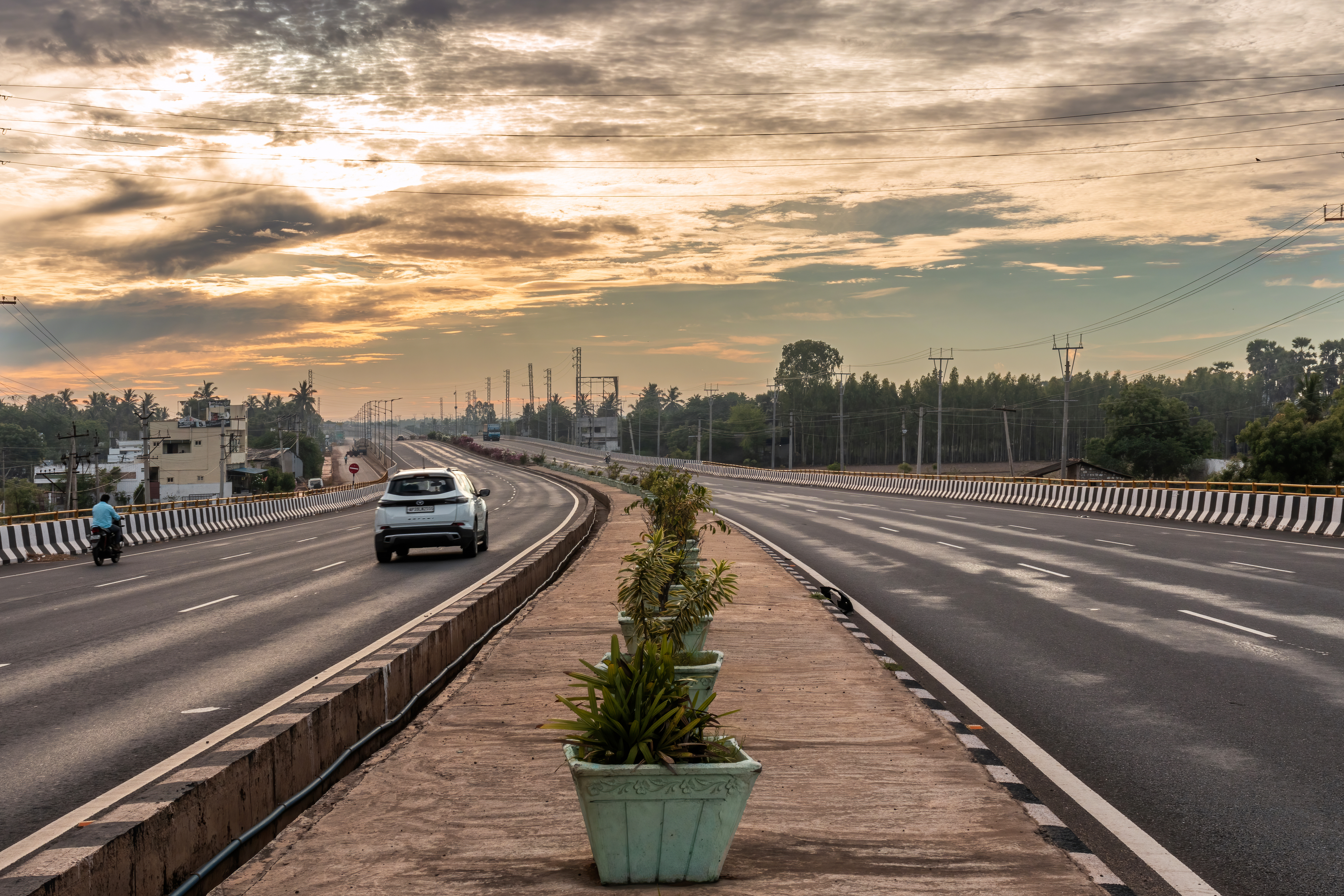
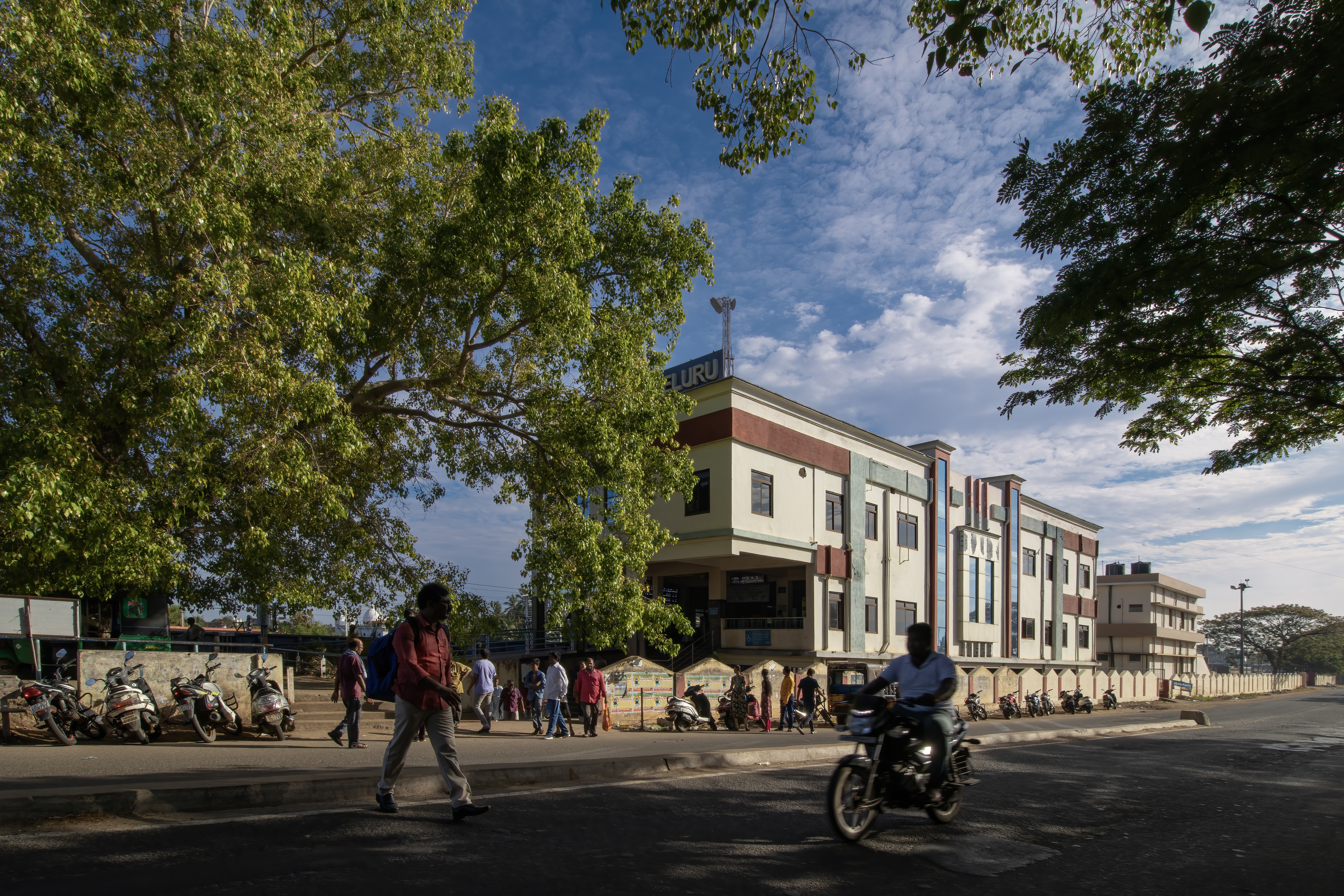
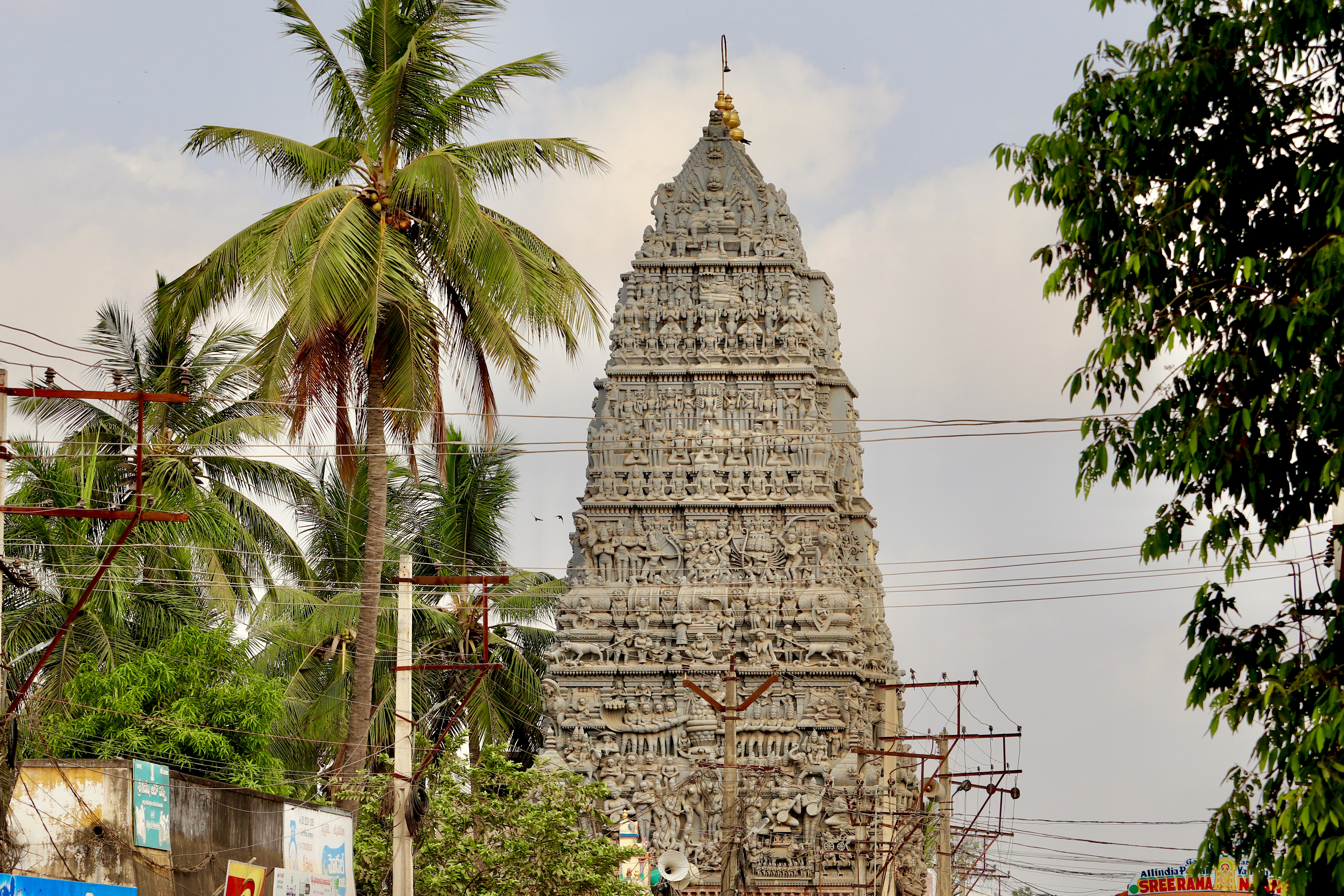
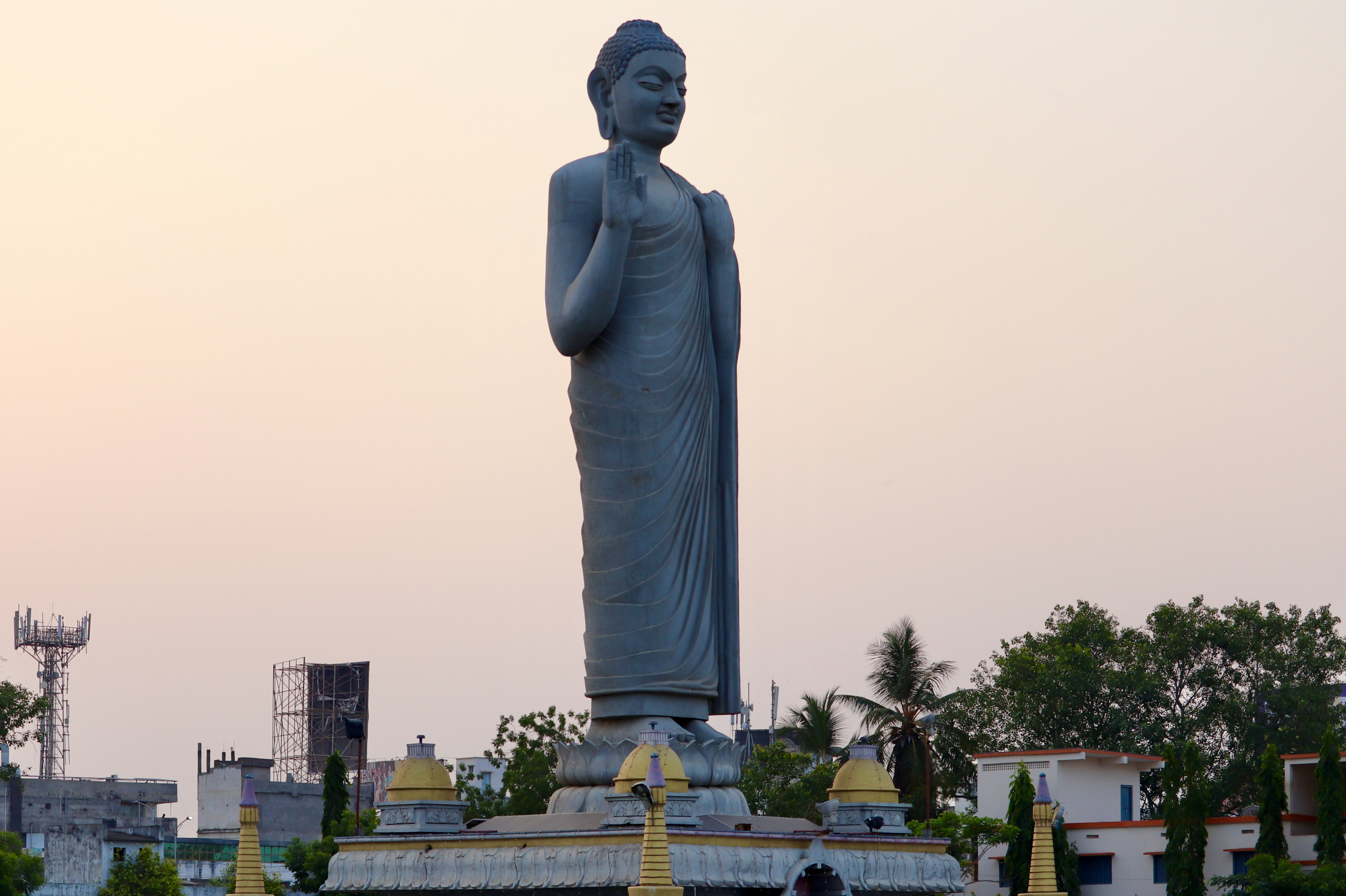
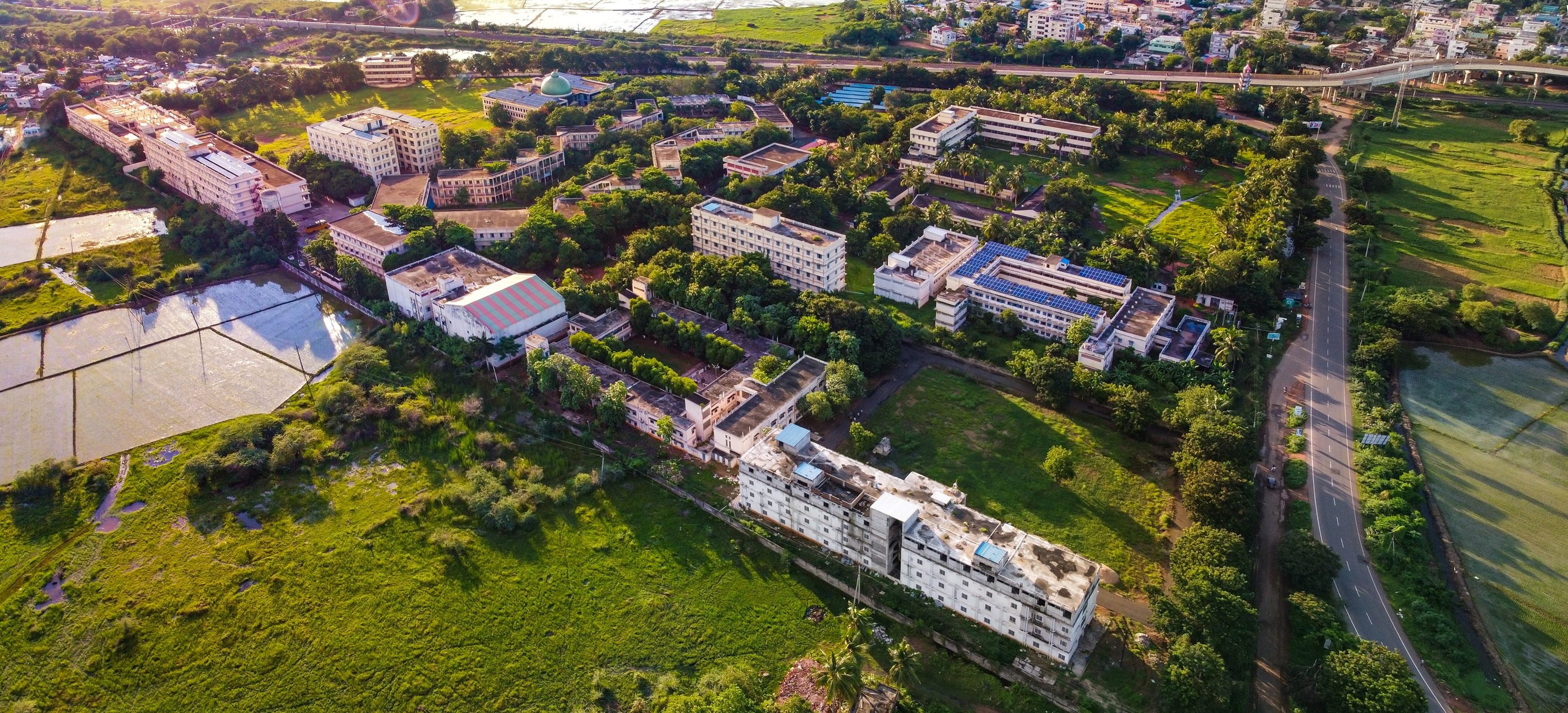
- Clockwise from top: District Collectorate of Eluru district, Eluru railway station, Eluru Buddha Park, Sir C.R. Reddy Educational Institutions, Gopuram of Sanivarapupeta temple and NH16 near Eluru

- Nickname: City of Carpets
- Motto: Truth always Triumphs
- Location within Andhra Pradesh
- Coordinates: 16°42′42″N 81°06′11″E
- Country: India
- State: Andhra Pradesh
- District: Eluru
- Founded: 2nd century
- Incorporated (town): 1866
- Incorporated (city): 9 April 2005

Government
  - Type: Mayor–council
  - Body: Eluru Municipal Corporation, ELUDA
  - M.P: Putta Mahesh Kumar (T.D.P)
  - M.L.A: Radha Krishnayya Badeti (T.D.P)

Area
  - Municipal Corporation: 11.52 km^{2} (4.45 sq mi)
  - Urban: 154 km^{2} (59 sq mi)
  - Metro: 3,328.99 km^{2} (1,285.33 sq mi)
- Elevation: 22 m (72 ft)

Population (2011)
  - Municipal Corporation: 214,414
  - Rank: 12th (in state)
  - Density: 18,610/km^{2} (48,210/sq mi)
  - Metro: 2,760,160
- Demonym(s): Elurian, Elurite, Helapuree

Languages
  - Official: Telugu
- Time zone: UTC+5:30 (IST)
- PIN: 534***
- Telephone code: +91–08812
- Vehicle registration: AP-39
- Website: cdma.ap.gov.in/en/welcome-eluru-municipal-corporation-3

Eluru (/ˈeɪluːrʊ/ AY-loo-roo) is a city and the district headquarters of Eluru district in the Indian state of Andhra Pradesh, Historically known as Ellore". It is one of the 14 municipal corporations in the state and the mandal headquarters of Eluru mandal in the Eluru revenue division. Situated on the banks of the Tammileru River, Eluru is strategically positioned in the southeastern part of Andhra Pradesh. It was historically known as Helapuri. As of 2011 Census of India, the city had a population of 214,414, where as Eluru Urban Development Authority has a population around 2,760,160, reflecting its status as a major urban centre. The city's historical significance dates back to the second century CE, with evidence of its ancient roots found in various archaeological sites and historical records. Eluru was a prominent town under the rule of the Qutub Shahis, who governed the region in the 16th century. It came under the control of the Mughal Empire in the 17th century as the empire expanded its influence across South India. The town later became part of the Nawab of Hyderabad's dominions in the 18th century. During British India, Eluru was incorporated into the Madras Presidency and made capital for Northern Circars in the early 19th century. The British established administrative and infrastructural developments in the town, shaping its modern identity.

The city came into headlines after the outbreak in 2020, which was a significant event that drew national attention. The incident involved a mysterious illness that affected hundreds of people, leading to widespread concern and a major public health response. It is situated in the Krishna River Delta region, and is known for its fertile agricultural lands. The city is intersected by various rivers and canals. Kolleru Lake, one of the largest inland freshwater lakes in India is located within a few kilometers from the city.

Eluru has made significant contributions to Indian film and arts through several notable personalities like L. V. Prasad, Silk Smitha, Sekhar Kammula etc. The city plays a crucial role in regional commerce, Eluru is renowned primarily for its pile carpets, though it also manufactures textiles and leather goods. Additionally, the city serves as a key trade hub for fresh water fish, lemon, rice, oilseeds, tobacco, and sugar. Located on the Golden Quadrilateral, the city is well-connected by road, rail, and airways. Alluri Sitarama Raju Stadium, situated in Eluru, is a prominent sports venue named after the celebrated Indian freedom fighter Alluri Sitarama Raju. Eluru's educational landscape includes several notable institutions, such as ASRAM Medical college, Sir C.R. Reddy Educational Institutions, etc, which contribute to the city's reputation as a centre for learning.

== History ==
=== Toponymy ===
The city was part of the Vengi Kingdom and served as the capital during the Buddhist kingdom's rule, where it was known as 'Helapuri'. It was also called Erla Uru before being renamed Ellore by the British. To avoid confusion with Vellore, which had a similar pronunciation during the Nizam rule, Ellore was referred to as Uppu Ellore (i.e. Salt Ellore), while Vellore was called Ra Vellore or Raya Vellore.

=== Early and medieval history ===
Historical affiliations
- Qutub Shahis 1565–1687
- Mughal Empire 1687–1724
- Nizam State 1724–1753
- French East India Company 1753–1759
- Northern Circas 1759–1947
- Madras State 1947–1953
- Andhra State 1953–1956
- Andhra Pradesh Since 1956

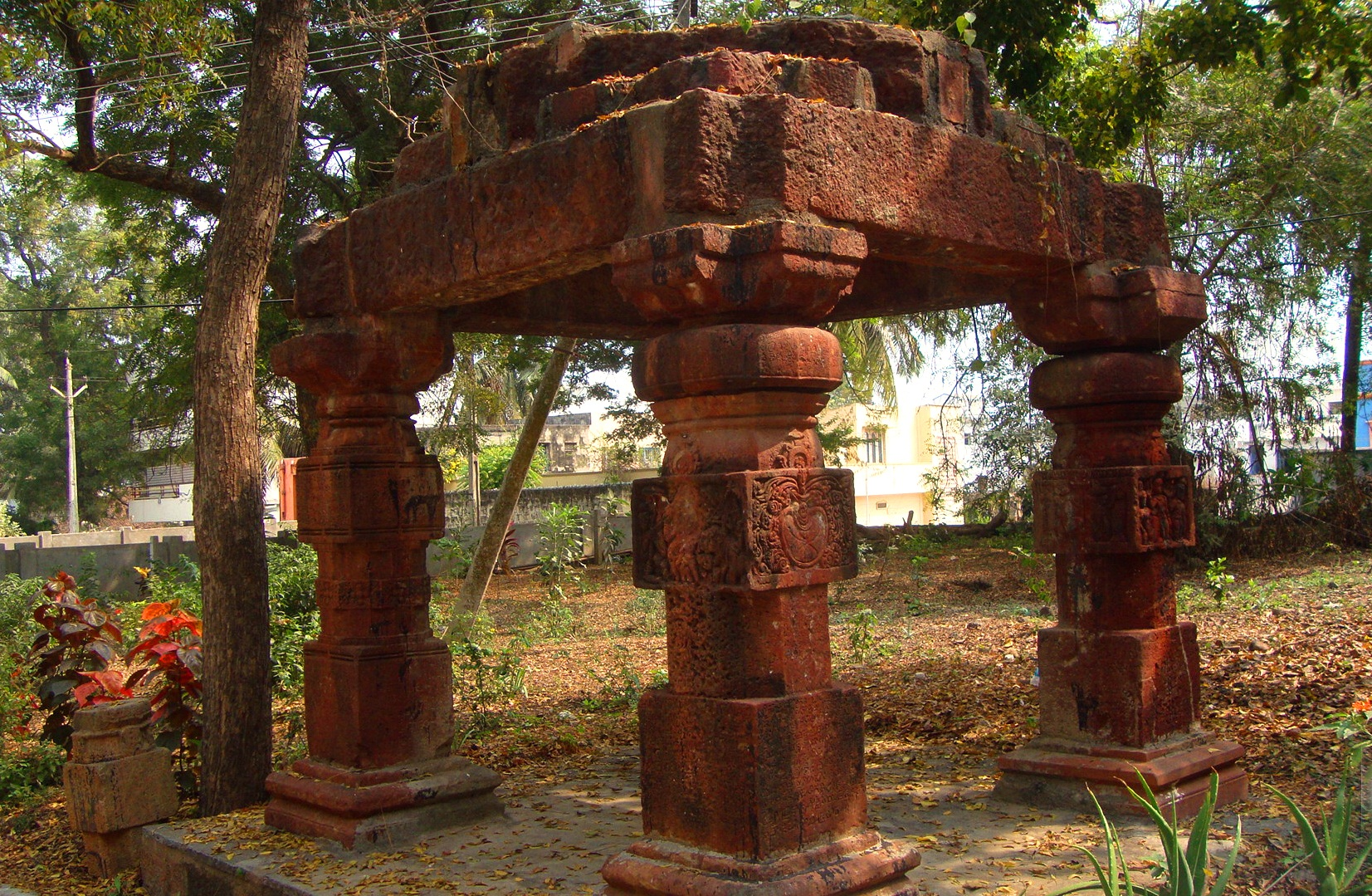
There were 25 inscriptions of Vengi Chalukyas found on these pillars of Mandapam at Kotadibba, (Eluru Fort Land)

The history of Eluru dates back to the second century CE and has great prominence in the history of Andhra. Vengi near Eluru was the capital of Andhra from the second century to the twelfth century, ruled by Salankayanas, Vishnukudinas, and Eastern Chalukyas. Vengi was the capital city of Andhradesa for more years than any other city in Andhra Pradesh.

The Salankayanas ruled from the third to the fifth century CE, with their domain centred around the Vengi region and Eluru serving as their capital. Known as Šalaňkayana after their Gotra name, they were feudatories of the Ikshvakus. The historical significance of the Salankayanas is highlighted by the inscription of their first known king, Devavarman, in Eluru (Ellore), where he recorded performing the Ashvamedha sacrifice to mark his successful establishment of the kingdom. The Salankayanas are considered one of the elusive kingdoms of Andhra, with their timeline corroborated by references in the Samudra Gupta inscription mentioning Hastivarman of Vengi.

In the late fifth century, the Salankayanas were conquered by Madhavarma II of the Vishnukundinas. During the reign of Madhava Varma the Great, they became independent and conquered coastal Andhra from the Salankayanas and might have shifted their capital to a place in coastal Andhra. Eluru was a major city of the Vishnukundinas. Vishnukundin reign might be fixed between the end of the Salankayana and the rise of the Eastern Chalukyan power in 624 AD.

Eastern Chalukyas, or Chalukyas of Vengi, were a dynasty of South India whose kingdom was in the present day Andhra Pradesh. Their capital was Vengi near Eluru and their dynasty lasted around 500 years from the seventh century until 1130 AD, when the Vengi kingdom merged with the Chola empire. The Vengi kingdom continued to be ruled by the Eastern Chalukyas (Eastern Chalukyan kings) under the protection of the Chola empire until 1189 AD, when the kingdom succumbed to the Hoysalas. They had their capital originally at Vengi, now Pedavegi, near Eluru and was later changed to Rajamahendravaram (Rajahmundry).

After the defeat and capture of Prataparudra II in 1323 AD, the annexation of the region from Nellore to Rajahmundry, including Eluru. A Persian inscription from the same year by Sultan Ghiyath al-Din Tughluq is found on the main gateway of the large mosque in Rajahmundry. Additionally, coins of this Sultan have been discovered in a village near Eluru. Nearly all of the Telugu country had come under Muslim rule by 1324 AD Eluru was captured by the Kakatiyas and then became a part of the Kalinga Empire until 1471 AD. Later, it fell into the hands of the Gajapatis. In 1515, Srikrishnadevaraya captured it. After the fall of the Vijayanagara Kingdom, The region fell under Qutb Shahi dynasty in c. 1565 AD and subsequently became part of the Mughal Empire in 1687.

=== Modern history ===
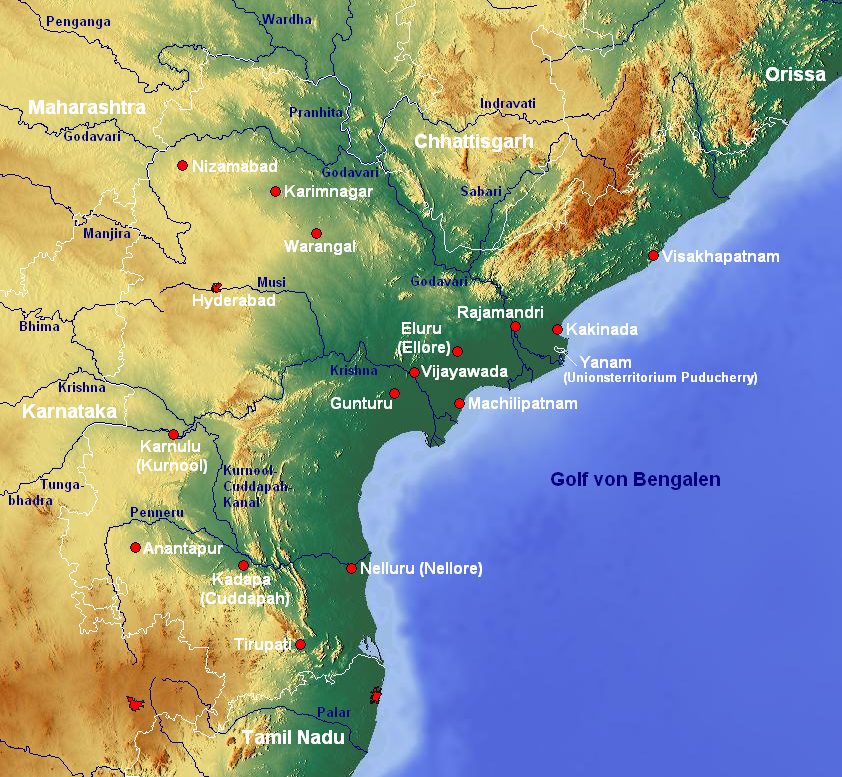
Map of Andhra Pradesh prior to Independence

In the early 17th century, the East India Company was establishing its foothold in the Indian subcontinent amidst the complex political landscape of the Mughal Empire. In 1689, after Mughal forces occupied the Vizagapatam factory and seized Company servants, the renewal of the factory's lease was secured, including for Eluru. The President of Fort St. George informed the Governors of Eluru and other factories about the reconciliation with the Mughals. Due to threats from local bandits, the Company requested permission to fortify the Vizagapatam factory, which Nawab Asad Khan granted in April 1689.

In 1724, the region was integrated into the Nizam of Hyderabad's dominion. In 1748 AD, Nizam-ul-Mulk died, leading to a succession dispute between his son Nasir Jung and his grandson Muzaffar Jung. Both, however, were ultimately overthrown due to the machinations of their subordinates. As a result, Salabat Jung, the third son of Nizam-ul-Mulk, was elevated to the throne with the support of the French. Between 1750 and 1850, the Northern Coromandel region, including Eluru, witnessed significant political and administrative changes. In 1753 AD, Salabat Jung granted the provinces of Kondapalle, Eluru, Rajahmundry, and Chicacole to the French East India Company as a means to maintain their military forces. In the mid-18th century, the power struggle between the French and British East India Companies significantly impacted the region around Eluru. By December 1758, during the Carnatic wars, British forces under Lieutenant Colonel Forde began a series of military operations in the Northern Circars, including the area around Eluru. This was part of a broader strategy to weaken the French position in the Deccan and support local allies. On 20 October 1758, British troops arrived at Visakhapatnam, subsequently advancing to Eluru. By 6 February 1759, British forces reached Eluru, and by 3 March, they neared Masulipatnam. The French commander, Conflaus, had sought assistance from the Nizam of Hyderabad, Salabat Jung, but British pressure led to the eventual surrender of Masulipatnam on 8 April 1759. Salabat Jung, the Nizam of Hyderabad, initially allied with the French but was forced to retreat after a treaty with the British, after the rebellion by his brother, Nizam Ali Khan. In 1760, Nizam Ali Khan sought British assistance in his conflict with the Marathas, offering the cession of Eluru and two other Circars. Although the British couldn't spare troops, they suggested to Hasan Ali Khan, the fauzdar of Eluru, to lease the five Northern Circars to them in return for half the net revenue. In 1762, Nizam Ali Khan ousted Salabat Jung and usurped the throne, leading to the British occupying the Circars, including Eluru, under the sanads delivered by Hasan Ali Khan. When Nizam Ali Khan demanded the return of the sanads and the restoration of the territory, he appointed Buddea Jemah Khan as the new fauzdar in 1763. However, Jemah Khan struggled to maintain authority after the withdrawal of British troops and was forced to take refuge in the fort of Eluru when the Raja of Vizianagaram captured Rajahmundry. By 1766, a treaty was concluded where the British agreed to hold the Northern Circars, including Eluru, on payment of tribute and the provision of troops. Hasan Ali Khan's administration ended with the expiration of his lease in 1769, and Eluru, along with Rajahmundry and Kondapalle, was placed under the direct control of the British, managed by the Chief and Council at Machilipatnam. This agreement was part of a broader strategy by the British to secure their interests in the region and stabilize their position against other regional powers.

In AD 1785, disputes over estate management, including Eluru, led to unrest. During this period, Eluru's revenue management was intertwined with neighboring estates such as Polavaram, Gutala and Kothapalle. The early history of the zamindari of Eluru is not well-documented. By AD 1786, Tirapati Raju, the zamindar of Mogalthur who owns Eluru, fell behind on payments, which led to the estate being taken over by the Company. Revell was appointed to oversee the estate with assistance from Bhupayya, the zamindar's diwan, and the zamindar eventually settled his debts faithfully. In AD 1791, following the death of Tirapati Raju and an insurrection led by Jagga Raju, the Mogalthuru zamindari, including Eluru, was annexed to the Company's dominions and leased out. The renters, Bhupayya and Venkatarama Raju, failed to meet their obligations and fled, leading to further disturbances. In AD 1794, the Masulipatnam district, including Eluru, was reorganized into three collectorates with headquarters at Mogalthuru, Cocanada, and Rajahmundry, with Eluru under Rajahmundry's jurisdiction.

During British rule, Eluru was a military station and the capital city of Northern Circars, a division of the Madras Presidency. In the Madras Presidency, the District of Rajahmundry was created in 1823. It was reorganized in 1859 and was bifurcated into Godavari and Machilipatnam districts. Eluru was a part of Machilipatnam district after the division of the Northern Circars. In 1859, it was included in the Godavari District; later, it was made a part of the Krishna district. During British rule, Rajahmundry was the headquarters of the Godavari district, which was further bifurcated into East Godavari and West Godavari districts in 1925. When the Godavari district was divided, Eluru became the headquarters of West Godavari district. In 2022, Eluru district was carved out of West Godavari and includes the Assembly constituencies of Eluru, Chintalapudi, Nuzvid, Denduluru, Unguturu, Kaikalur and Polavaram.

=== Indian independence movement ===
In 1894, the farmers of Krishna district held a conference in Eluru to protest against the increased water rates, refusing to cultivate their lands until the rates were reduced. After attending the All India Congress Committee meeting in 1921, Mahatma Gandhi visited several coastal towns, including Eluru, to promote nationalism. During his visit, he inaugurated the Gandhi Andhra Jateeya Mahavidyalayam, a National College aimed at spreading higher education in the city. After the decision of the All India Congress Socialist Party (AICSP) to organize provincial parties, the Andhra Pradesh Congress Socialist Party (APCSP) was formed in June 1934. The main goal, as articulated by N. G. Ranga, was "to convert the Congress to socialism" and to expand the party's influence throughout Andhra. Branches were established in Eluru, Guntur, Gudivada, and Bezawada. Initially, the party focused on organizing conferences, holding meetings for socialist propaganda, and hosting tours by national leaders like Jayaprakash Narayan and Jawaharlal Nehru. Members of the All India Khadi Board visited Eluru, urging people to produce and use khaddar, which led to a significant increase in demand, causing local depots to struggle to keep up. The district's political awareness was further demonstrated during the Simon Commission's visit in 1928. The Eluru Municipality passed a resolution supporting the boycott of the Commission and ordered the closure of all municipal institutions on the day they arrived in India.

During Mahatma Gandhi's individual Satyagraha in 1941, Pattabhi Sitaramaiah led the movement in Andhra. After Sitaramaiah's arrest, Venkata Raju was appointed as his successor with Gandhi's approval on 19 March 1941. Venkata Raju subsequently traveled to various Andhra towns, including Eluru, to build support for the Satyagraha. His efforts were notable in Eluru and other locations such as Guntur, Vijayawada, and Kakinada. Venkata Raju's activism continued during the Quit India Movement, where he led underground efforts in Guntur district before his arrest in Tenali on 3 September 1942.

=== Dalit Movement ===
Under the chairmanship of Bhagya Reddy Varma, the First Andhra Desa Panchama Conference was held in Bezawada (Vijayawada) on 4–6 November 1917. Varma's efforts included extensive tours across Andhra Districts, with Eluru being a notable stop. His advocacy led to a significant shift in government policy. The Government of Madras, influenced by these pressures, issued G.O.No. 817 on 25 March 1922, replacing the term Panchama with Adi-Andhra in Andhra.

In 1944, Dr. B.R. Ambedkar visited Eluru during his tour of Andhra Pradesh. Ambedkar used his platform to criticize Gandhi, asserting that Gandhi's policies were unsuitable for India and likening them unfavorably to Abraham Lincoln's approach. Despite his criticism of Gandhi, Ambedkar's visit was significant for Eluru's Dalit community. His speeches inspired local untouchables, leading to increased self-consciousness and activism. Ambedkar's visit was well-received, and he was presented with Welcome Addresses by various local associations, including the Vaisya Association, Backward Classes Association, and Prema Samajam. Ambedkar's visit to Eluru and other Andhra towns, along with the government's support for the upliftment of untouchables, marked a period of significant social and political change in the region. His influence helped galvanize local leaders and activists, contributing to the broader Dalit movement in Andhra Pradesh.

=== Eluru outbreak ===
On 4 December 2020, Eluru experienced an outbreak of neurological symptoms, including seizures and loss of consciousness. Within three days, approximately 500 people were affected. Multidisciplinary teams from WHO and AIIMS, Mangalagiri were dispatched to investigate the outbreak. The team collected biological samples, including blood and urine, from 112 participants, comprising 103 cases (77 active cases and 26 recovered) and 9 controls. Water and food samples were also gathered to identify potential sources of contamination. Analysis revealed that Triazofos, an organophosphate pesticide, was present in 74% of blood samples and its metabolites in 98% of urine samples from affected individuals. Heavy metals, including lead and mercury, were within permissible limits, and no mycotoxins were detected in food samples. While municipal water sources were free of pesticides, household water contained Triazofos at an average concentration of 1.00 μg/L. The investigation concluded that Triazofos pesticide contamination in household drinking water was the likely cause of the outbreak. Recommendations included enhanced surveillance for residual pesticides in soil, water, and food, as well as an intersectoral approach involving government and public health agencies to identify contamination sources. Promoting rational pesticide use and conducting educational programs were also advised to prevent future outbreaks.

== Geography ==
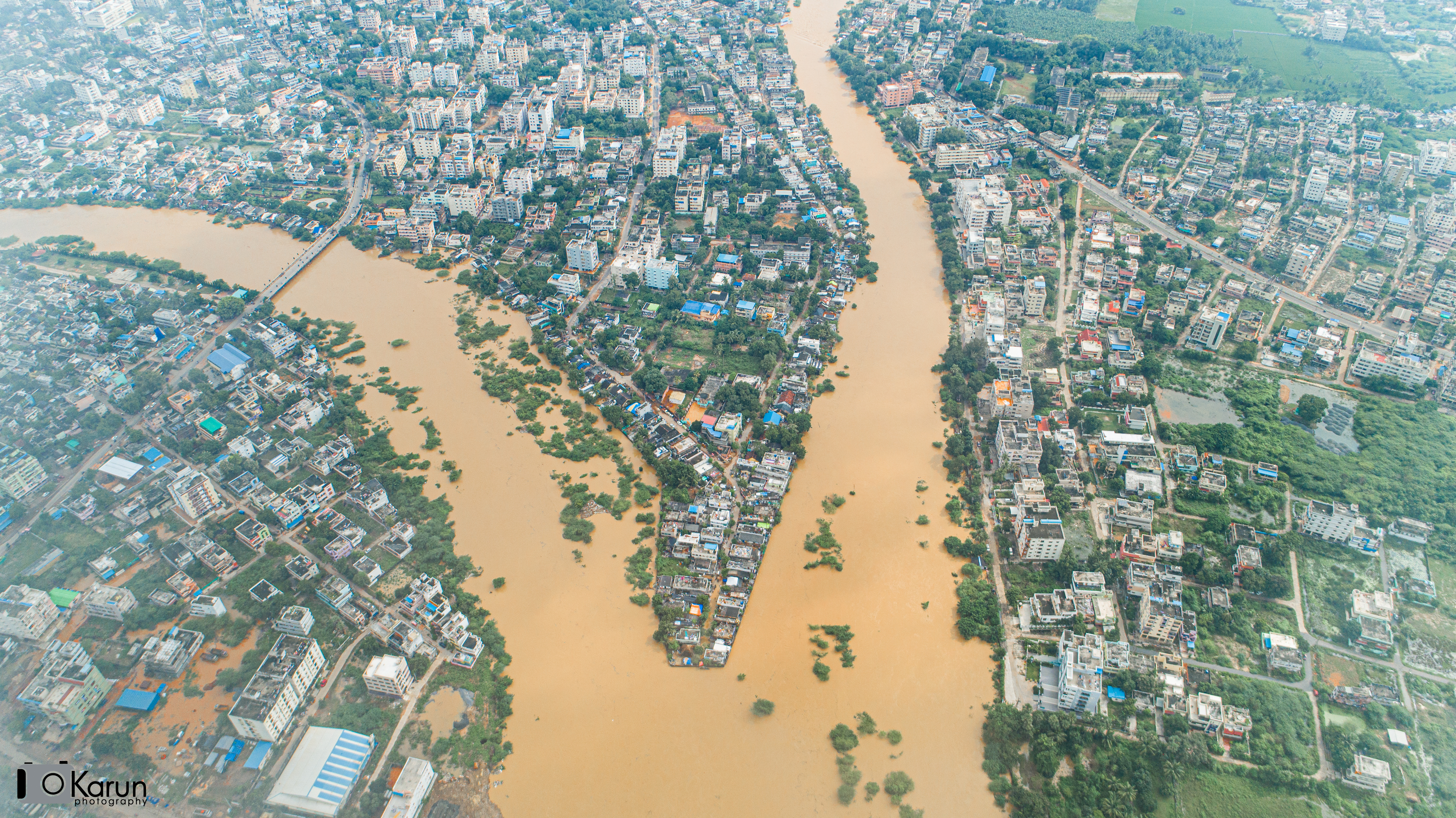
Tammileru river at Ashok nagar during floods in 2020

Eluru is situated at 16°42′42″N 81°06′11″E, with an average elevation of 22 m (72 ft) from the sea level. It is located on the Eastern coastal plains, approximately midway between the Krishna and Godavari rivers and about 50 kilometers inland from the Bay of Bengal. The city's geography is notably shaped by its proximity to several significant water bodies. The Tammileru River flows through Eluru and ultimately empties into Kolleru Lake, a large freshwater lake situated near the city. Kolleru Lake is crucial for local agriculture and wildlife, serving as an important ecological and economic resource. The Eluru Canal runs through the city and serves as a major irrigation and waterway. This canal is a crucial part of the region's water management system, transporting water from the Krishna River and facilitating irrigation for the surrounding agricultural areas.

Eluru is located in the Pranhita–Godavari Basin, a rift that stretches from Boregaon in Maharashtra to the east coast of Andhra Pradesh. This region features a range of geological deposits from the Permian to Early Cretaceous periods. Lower Gondwana formations like Talchir and Barakar are found along the basin's edges, while Upper Gondwana sediments, including Kamthi and Kota Sandstones, are present in the central areas. The basin's diverse geology reflects a history of varying marine and terrestrial environments.

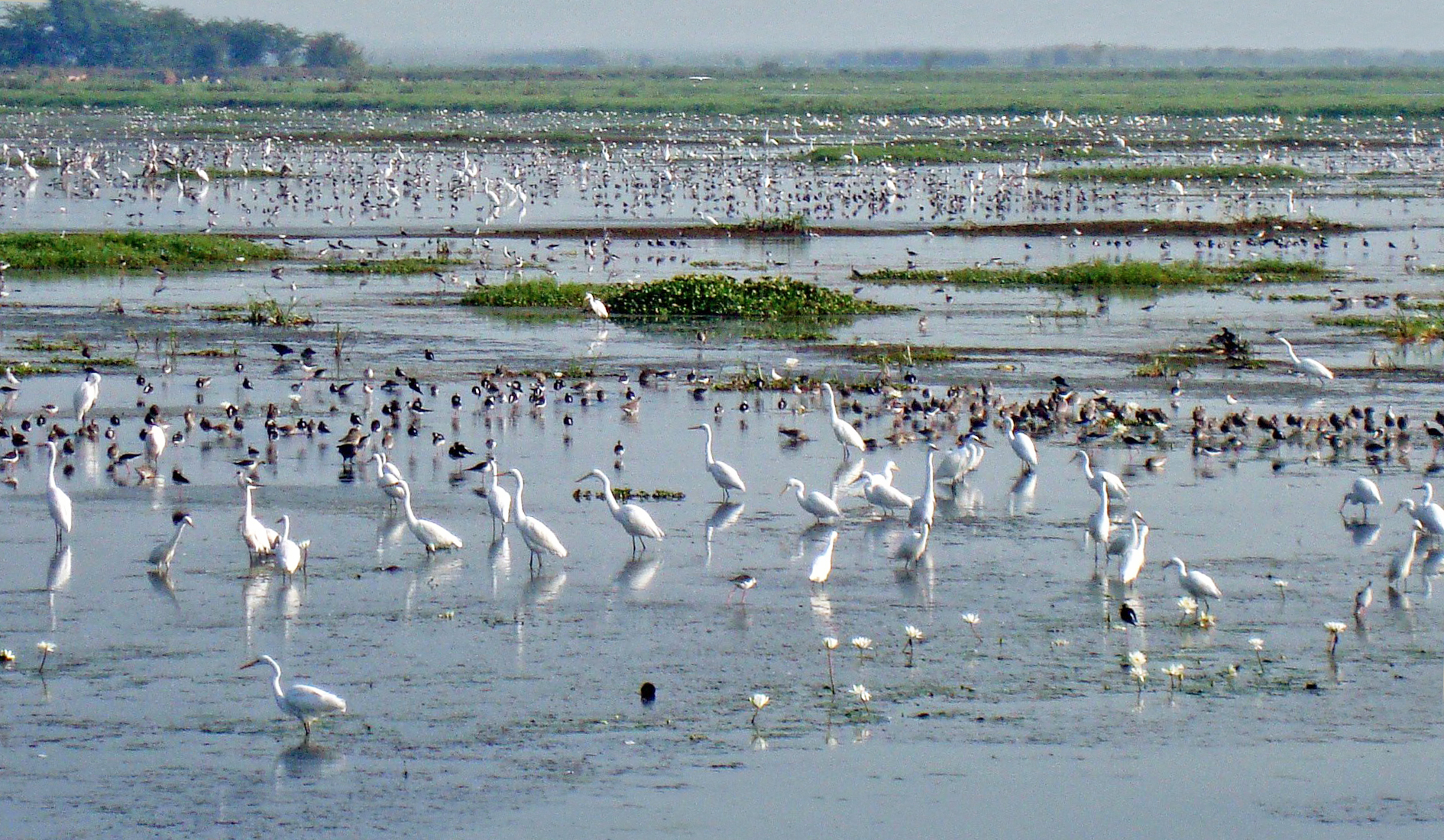
Kolleru lake during Winter

Kolleru Lake is the largest freshwater lake situated between the major river deltas of the Godavari and Krishna along India's east coast. This shallow wetland has a depth ranging between 0.5 and 2.0 meters in summer and spans approximately 245 square kilometers. Designated as a wetland of international significance under the Ramsar Convention, Kolleru serves as a flood-balancing reservoir and a crucial habitat for various resident and migratory bird species over an area of about 910 square kilometers. While the exact origin of Kolleru Lake is unclear, previous studies based on sandy beach ridges and fossil shell datings suggest it may have formed as a coastal lagoon during the Mid-Holocene period.

=== Climate ===
Eluru experiences hot and humid climate due to its proximity to the shore of Bay of Bengal. It has an average annual temperature of 28.2 °C (82.8 °F). May is the hottest and December is the coolest month of the year. Temperature crosses 40 °C (104 °F) in summer. July receives most precipitation and annually the city receives an average rainfall of 992 mm (39.1 in).

Climate data for Eluru, Andhra Pradesh
| Month | Jan | Feb | Mar | Apr | May | Jun | Jul | Aug | Sep | Oct | Nov | Dec | Year |
|---|---|---|---|---|---|---|---|---|---|---|---|---|---|
| Mean daily maximum °C (°F) | 29.1 (84.4) | 31.7 (89.1) | 34.5 (94.1) | 36.7 (98.1) | 38.6 (101.5) | 36.9 (98.4) | 32.4 (90.3) | 32.0 (89.6) | 32.2 (90.0) | 31.4 (88.5) | 29.8 (85.6) | 28.8 (83.8) | 32.8 (91.1) |
| Mean daily minimum °C (°F) | 18.9 (66.0) | 20.3 (68.5) | 22.6 (72.7) | 25.8 (78.4) | 27.9 (82.2) | 27.2 (81.0) | 25.4 (77.7) | 25.3 (77.5) | 25.3 (77.5) | 24.3 (75.7) | 21.3 (70.3) | 18.8 (65.8) | 23.6 (74.4) |
| Average rainfall mm (inches) | 3 (0.1) | 6 (0.2) | 6 (0.2) | 14 (0.6) | 40 (1.6) | 123 (4.8) | 229 (9.0) | 186 (7.3) | 170 (6.7) | 166 (6.5) | 40 (1.6) | 9 (0.4) | 992 (39) |
Source: en.climate-data.org

Eluru has been ranked 20th best "National Clean Air City" under (Category 3 population under 3 lakhs cities) in India.

=== Environment ===
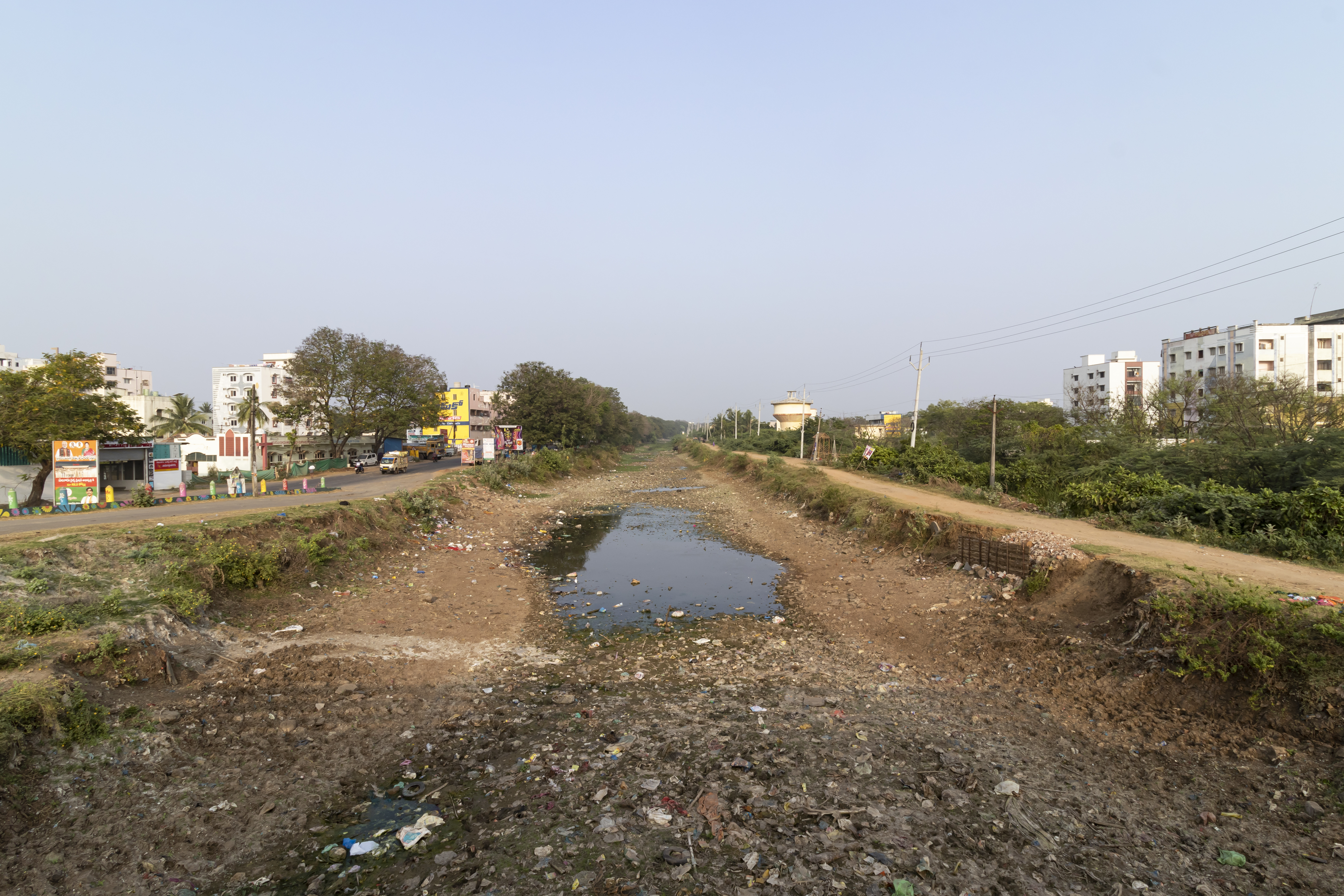
Dried Eluru canal bed with plastic debris

In August 2019, the National Green Tribunal (NGT) mandated action plans for all non-attainment cities, including Eluru. On 27 December 2019, an action plan was submitted by the Air Quality Monitoring Committee (AQMC) for Eluru. The Andhra Pradesh Pollution Control Board (APPCB) has been monitoring the city's ambient air quality under the National Ambient Air Quality Monitoring Programme (NAAQMP), focusing on parameters such as PM10, PM2.5, SO_{2}, and NO_{2}. Currently, air quality measurements are taken manually, as there are no real-time monitoring stations in Eluru. The city is categorized into four areas for air quality measurement: Commercial, Silent/Sensitive, Industrial, and Residential. The data indicates a decline in PM10 levels from 2014 to 2020, reflecting a positive trend. PM10 sources in Eluru are primarily roads and vehicular emissions, with no major industries within the city. Eluru generates 79 metric tons of solid waste daily and engages in home composting, with 3 metric tons of waste processed from 173 micro pockets of dry waste sent to a Material Recovery Facility (MRF) and wet waste sent to a vermicomposting unit. The city has a single dumping site located at Ponani and operates seven Pollution Under Control (PUC) centres within its limits.

The recent outbreak of a mysterious illness in Eluru and neighbouring villages highlights the pressing pollution issues in Kolleru Lake and other water bodies in Andhra Pradesh. Over 600 people fell ill, with experts detecting herbicides in vegetables and lead and nickel in patients' blood samples. Kolleru Bird Sanctuary, once home to millions of migratory birds such as glossy Ibis, painted storks, and grey pelicans, but now only limited numbers of painted storks and grey pelicans are observed in the lake. These birds, which previously migrated from Siberia and other regions between October and March for breeding, are now arriving in reduced numbers. This decline in bird populations is attributed to increasing pollution and environmental degradation. The Kolleru Bird Sanctuary, crucial for migratory and indigenous birds, is experiencing significant threats from contamination and habitat loss. Efforts to address these issues include reviewing a proposal for declaring an Eco-Sensitive Zone (ESZ) around Kolleru Lake to enhance pollution control and protect the region's ecological health.

== Demographics ==
Religions in Eluru
| Religion | Percent |
| Hindu | 89.51% |
| Muslim | 7.02% |
| Christians | 2.74% |
| Others† | 0.72% |
†Includes Sikhs, Jains

As of 2011 census of India, Eluru Municipal Corporation had a population of 214,414 of which 105,707 were male and 108,707 female, whilst Eluru urban agglomeration had a population of 250,693. The estimated city population during 2015–16, period was 350,000.

Hindus are in the majority, and are present throughout the city. There are also Christian, Sikh and Jain communities. According to the 2011 census, the religious make-up of Greater Hyderabad was: Hindus (89.51%), Muslims (7.02%), Christians (2.74%), and others (0.72%).

== Administration ==
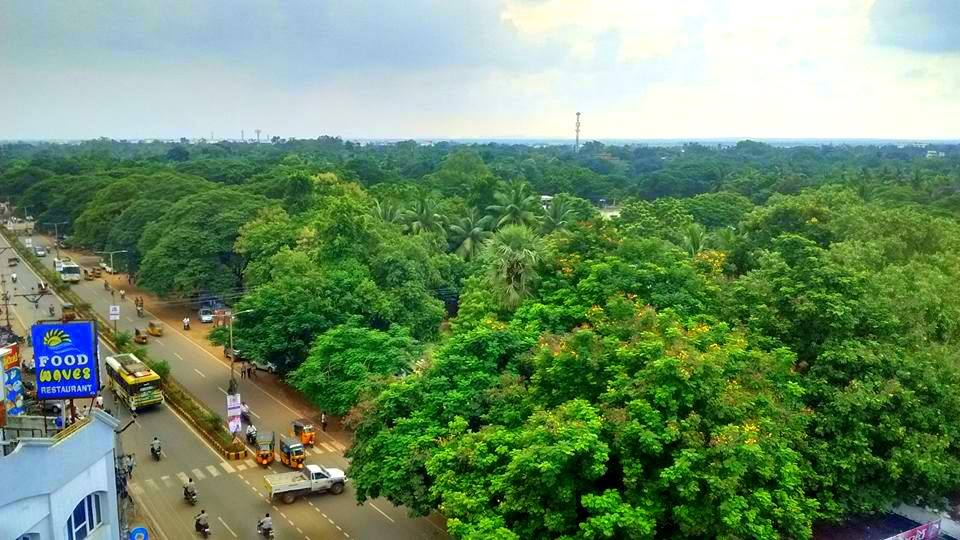
A view of Police Quarters

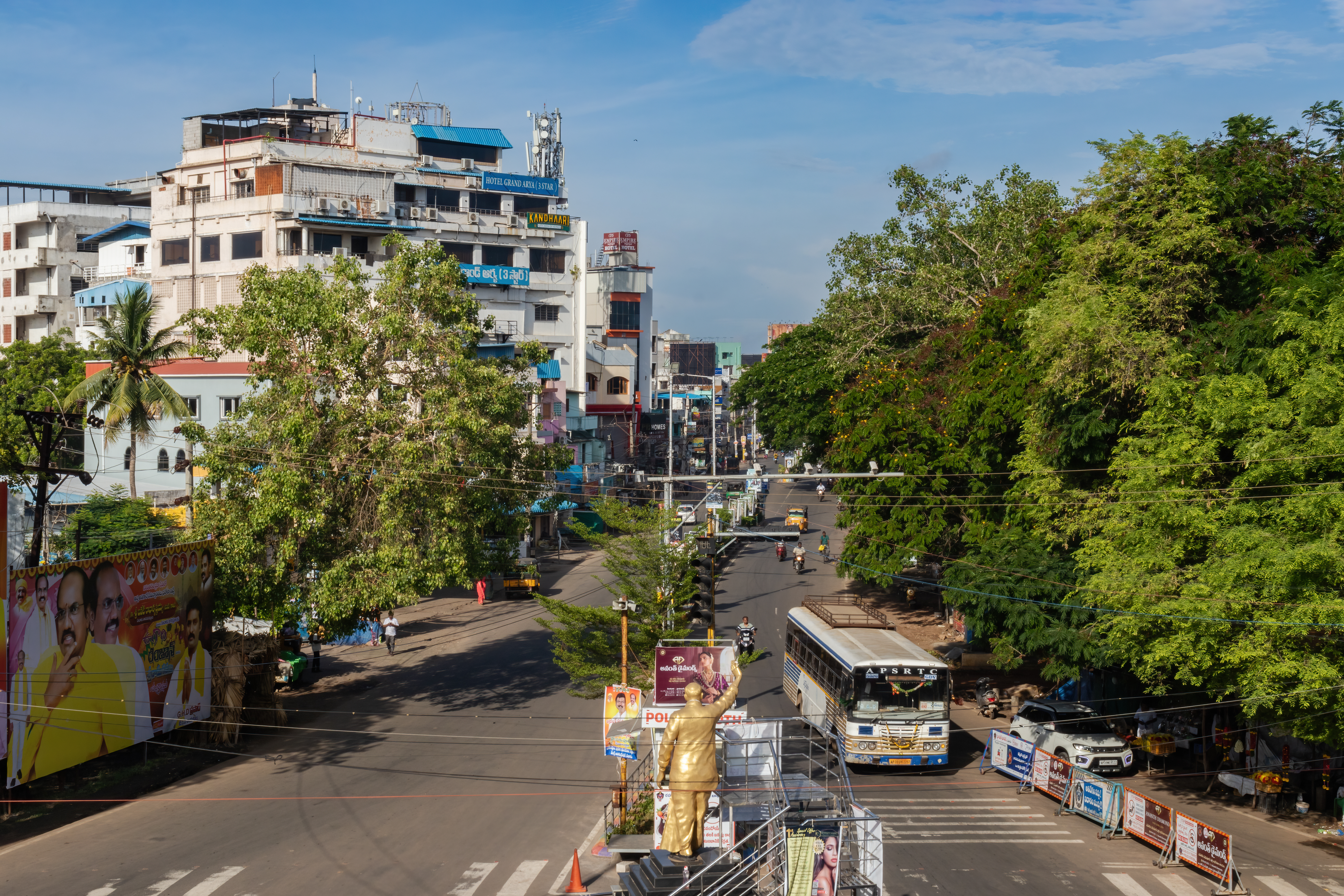
Fire Station center

=== Local Government ===
Eluru Municipal Corporation is the civic body of Eluru. It was first constituted as a municipality in 1866. Ramachandraraopet (R.R.Pet) and Narasimharaopet (N.R.Pet) came into existence following the implementation of town planning schemes by Eluru Municipality. The Narasimharaopet Scheme was initiated in 1942, with subsequent schemes, including Ramachandraraopet, Ashoknagar and Phirangula Dibba, providing essential amenities such as roads and street lighting. It was upgraded to Municipal Corporation on 9 April 2005 from selection grade municipality. It is spread over an area of 14.50 km^{2} (5.60 sq mi) with 50 wards. The present Municipal Commissioner of the city is Y.Sai Sreekanth and the Mayor is Shaik Noorjahan. In 2015, as per the 'Swachh Bharat Abhiyan' of the Ministry of Urban Development, Eluru Municipal Corporation was ranked 249th in the country.

Eluru urban agglomeration is spread over an area of 23.85 km^{2} (9.21 sq mi) and its constituents include Eluru municipal corporation, census towns of Sanivarapupeta, Satrampadu, Gavaravaram, Tangellamudi, and partly out growths of Komadavole, Eluru (rural) villages.

The Eluru Urban Development Authority (ELUDA) is an urban planning organization established on 1 January 2019, under the AP Metropolitan Region and Urban Development Authority Act, 2016. Based in Eluru, West Godavari district, the ELUDA is responsible for overseeing development and planning within its jurisdiction, which spans an area of 3,327.99 square kilometers. The authority manages urban planning for Eluru city, as well as seven municipalities namely; Bhimavaram, Kovvur, Narasapuram, Nidadavolu, Palakollu, Tadepalligudem, and Tanuku and one Nagar Panchayat, Jangareddygudem. The formation of ELUDA aims to streamline and enhance urban development in the region, ensuring coordinated growth and improved infrastructure.

Law and order in Eluru is maintained with the help of eight police stations, which includes one woman and one traffic police station. These are under the jurisdiction of the 'Additional Judicial First Class Magistrate'.

=== Healthcare ===
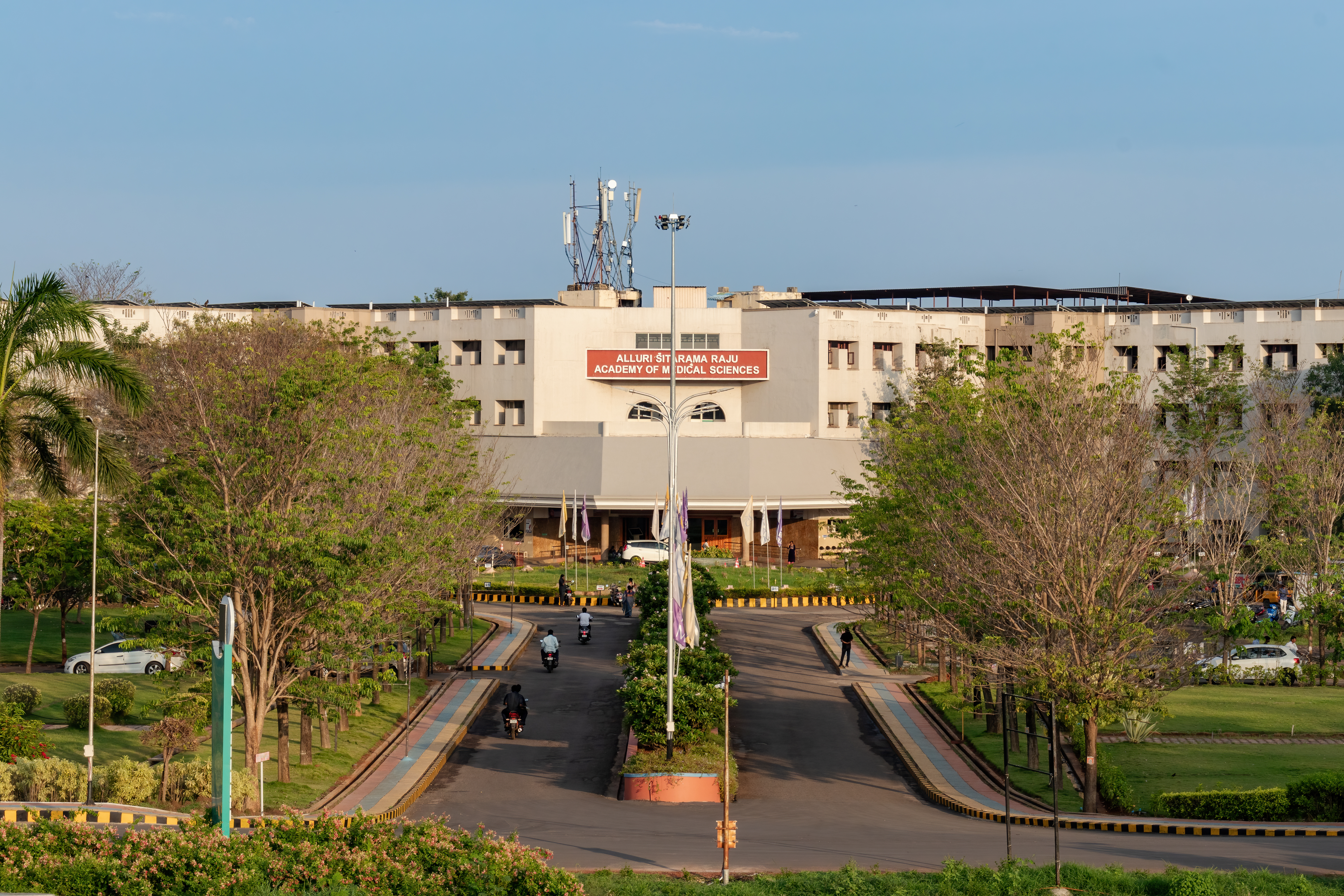
Main block of ASRAM, a major medical education and healthcare facility in Eluru

The District Headquarters Hospital in Eluru, the oldest medical facility in the city, started as a dispensary around 1858. It became a hospital in 1880 with 24 beds. When West Godavari district was created and Eluru became its headquarters in 1925, the hospital's capacity was increased to 72 beds and later to 95 beds in 1945. After 1953, the hospital saw major improvements, including a new building. By the 1960s, it had 300 beds and offered various services such as surgery, general medicine, pediatrics, eye care, family planning, dental care, and obstetrics and gynecology. It also had a blood bank and a district laboratory.

The Centre for Economic and Social Studies (CESS) has highlighted that West Godavari, which has since been split into Eluru district and West Godavari district, ranks first in Andhra Pradesh in terms of healthcare infrastructure development according to the Centre for Monitoring Indian Economy (CMIE). As of 1998, Eluru had 73 clinics, including 50 private and 23 government establishments. With a population of 215,804 (2001), the city had 159 doctors, translating to approximately 7.4 doctors per 10,000 people; 304 nurses, or about 14.1 nurses per 10,000 people; and 849 hospital beds, equating to about 39.4 beds per 10,000 people. Approximately 75% of private hospitals in Eluru were established between the 1980s and 1990s. Government hospitals account for 40% of the hospital beds, while 75% of doctors work in the private sector, and 55% of trained nurses and paramedics are employed privately.

In June 1914, Eluru established its first veterinary dispensary. By the end of 1968, the district's network included one veterinary hospital in Eluru, along with twenty-three primary veterinary dispensaries and thirteen rural veterinary dispensaries in the region. A clinical laboratory was also set up at the Eluru hospital to enhance veterinary services.

=== Politics ===
Eluru (Assembly constituency) is one of the constituencies for Andhra Pradesh Legislative Assembly. Radha Krishnayya Badeti is the present MLA of the constituency from Telugu Desam Party. The constituency falls under Eluru (Lok Sabha constituency) which was won by Putta Mahesh Kumar of the same party.

== Economy ==
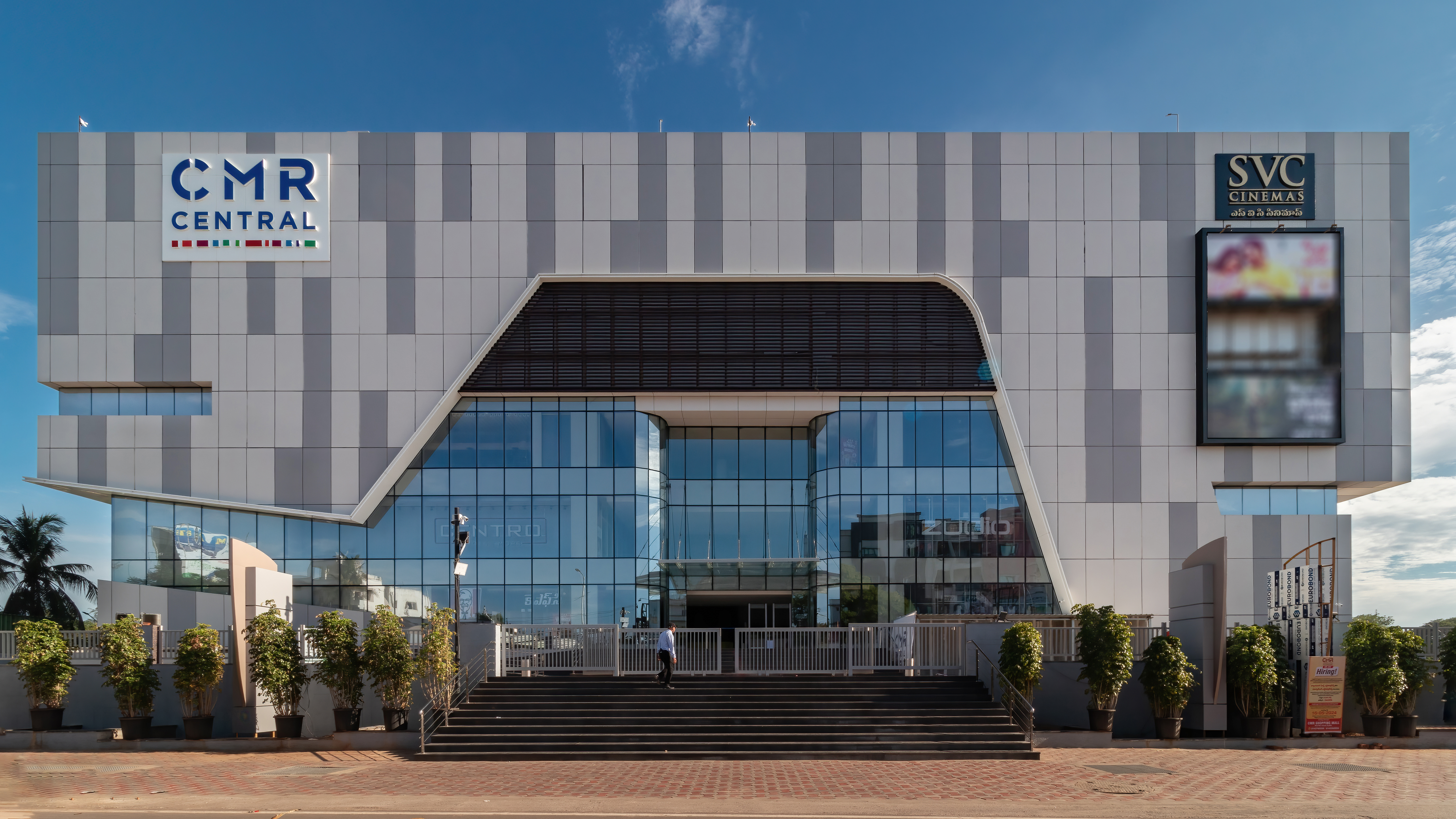
CMR Central shopping centre

Eluru is recognized for its diverse industrial landscape, featuring a wide range of functional categories and economic activities. Since the 17th century, Eluru was known for rug weaving, derived from weavers of Iranian descendants. Around 1900, the notable Madras export firm Arbuthnot contracted the production of Eluru carpets. R.R.Pet, Powerpet, Eluru 1-Town area are the commercial centres. Tangellamudi, Sanivarapupeta and Lakshavarapupeta areas of the city are known for the wool pile carpet industry. The eco-friendly carpets are exported to countries like the United States, Australia, Germany and the United Kingdom.

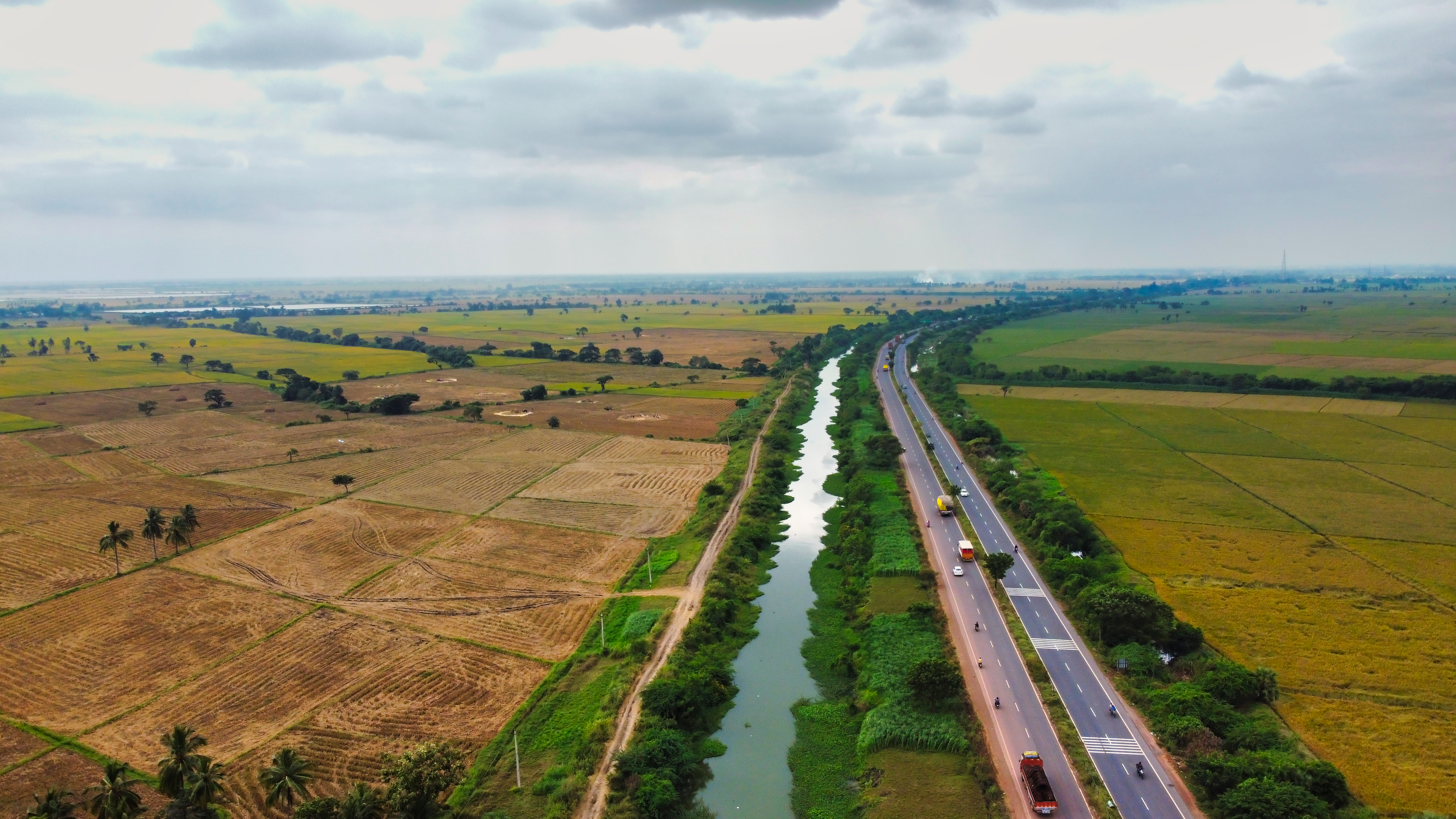
Eluru Canal alongside NH16

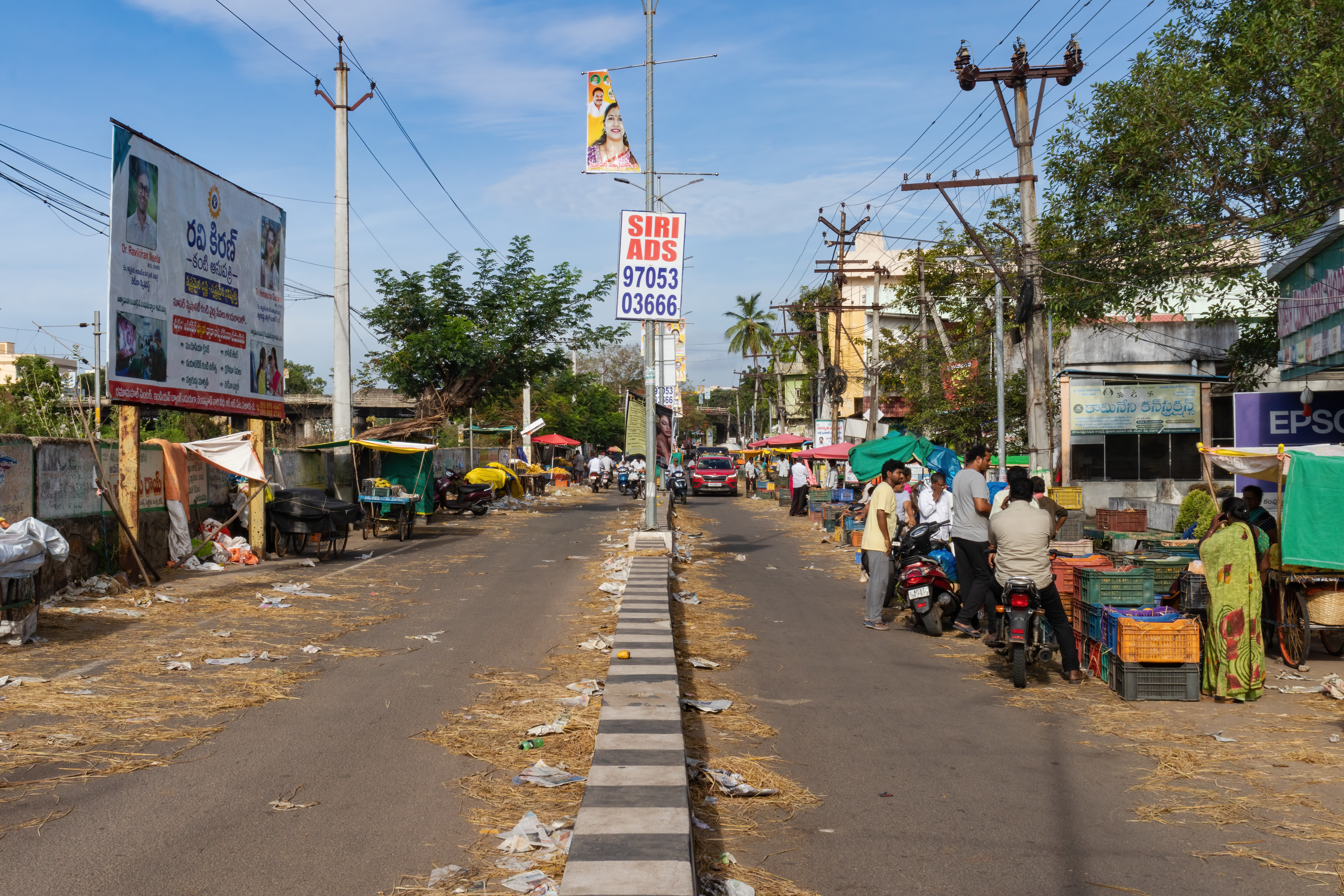
Mango market on Powerpet station road

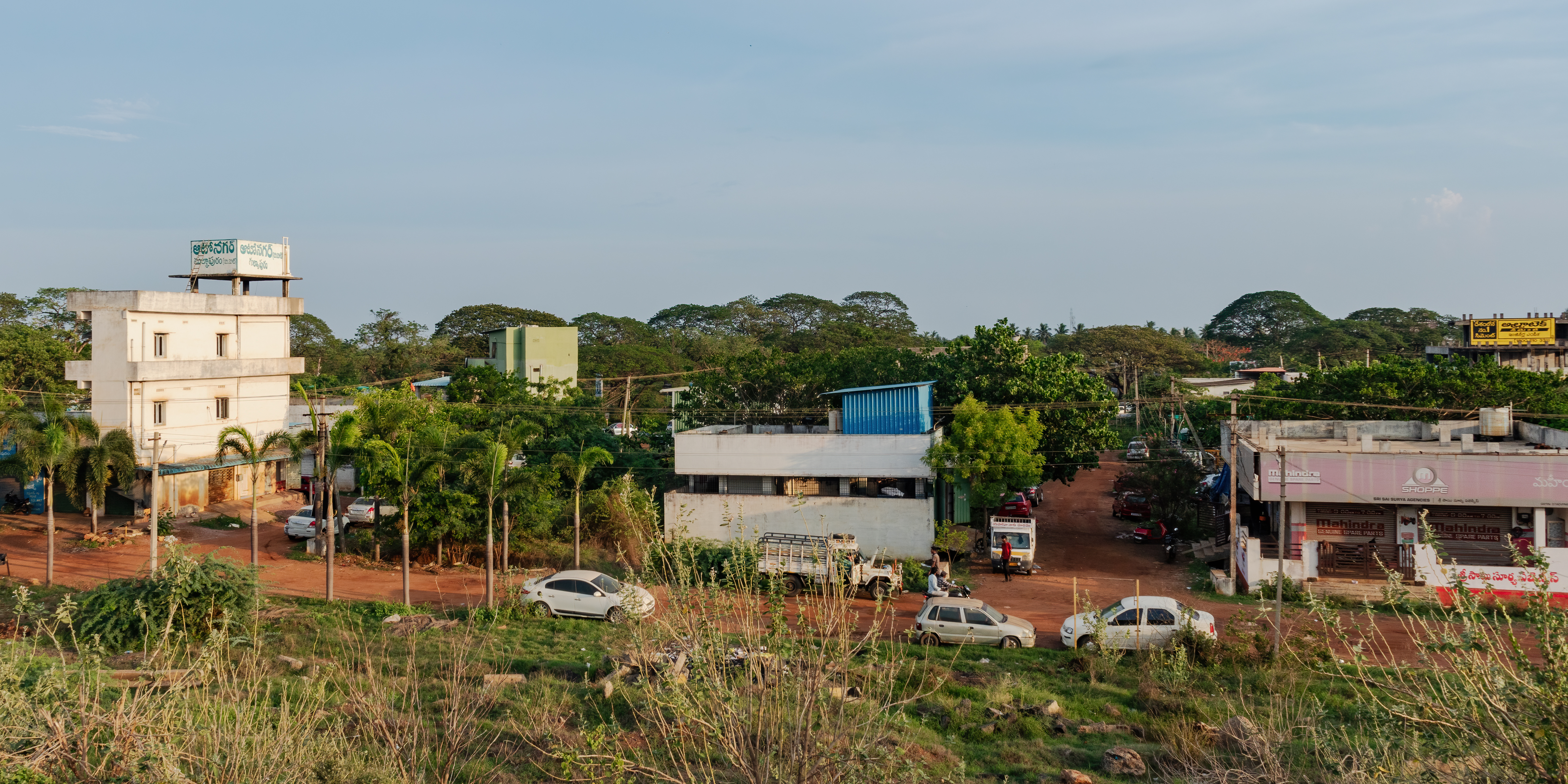
Auto Nagar industrial area in Eluru, established in 1991 and known for its Automobile workshops

In West Godavari, Eluru stands out for its significant role in livestock and poultry farming. According to the 1961 Livestock Census, Eluru taluk ranks first in livestock numbers and also leads in poultry population. The density of livestock in Eluru is 370.7 per square mile, while poultry density is 225.6 per square mile. Recent developments have boosted dairying in Eluru. The Integrated Milk Project, supported by UNICEF and the Government of India, began milk distribution in Eluru town on 1 January 1968. Within two years, daily milk supply surged from 35 liters to 3,100 liters, and by the end of 1969, Eluru had 14 milk distribution centers. Due to its proximity to Kolleru Lake, Eluru hosts approximately four fish markets that conduct trade statewide. These markets play a crucial role in the local economy by providing a significant source of income for fishermen and supporting numerous related businesses. The Eluru Canal, stretching over 64 kilometers, is vital to the local economy, irrigating about 24,483 hectares. This irrigation sustains agriculture in the region, which is key to its economic stability and growth.

In 1904, the Sree Krishna Jute Mills Limited began operations in Eluru as a public limited company. With an initial capital investment of Rs. 20 lakhs, the mills produce gunnies and jute twine, employing around 1,800 people, and had a production of 6,924.45 tonnes in 1967-68. This mill was later closed in 2022. Annapurna Pulverising Mills, established in 1963 in Eluru's industrial estate, has a capital investment of Rs. 5 lakhs. The mills manufacture pesticides and insecticides, producing 1,449 tonnes of dusts, 41 tonnes of wettable powders, and 30,648 litres of emulsions during 1968-69, and provide employment for about thirty people. Ambica Agarbathies Aroma & Industries Ltd., established in 1946, is one of the oldest contributors to the Eluru's economy. The company produces incense products in the city.

In 2016, a new facility for integration of weapons and manufacturing unit for Light Combat Aircraft (LCA) was planned for Eluru. The project, estimated to cost Rs ₹2,135 billion (US$22 billion), is a collaboration between UK-based Wem Technologies Private Limited and Lockheed Martin, the largest U.S. defense, aerospace, and security company. Then Chief Minister N. Chandrababu Naidu announced that 1.416 km^{2} (0.547 mi^{2}) of land in Vatluru and Bhogapuram villages near Eluru will be allocated for the facility. In the first phase, the facility will see an investment of Rs ₹635 billion (US$6.6 billion) crore and create 650 jobs, with a total of 2,510 jobs expected upon full operation. Wem Technologies currently holds orders valued at ₹560 billion (US$5.8 billion). The Indian Air Force (IAF) faces challenges with its aging fleet and a shortage of combat squadrons, currently operating 33 squadrons versus the needed 42. The induction of the indigenous Tejas fighter jets and ongoing negotiations for additional aircraft like the Rafale and Sukhoi-30 highlight India's efforts to bolster its air combat capabilities. The establishment of this new facility is expected to support these national defense objectives by enhancing domestic production of advanced aircraft.

The Indian Institute of Oil Palm Research, situated near Pedavegi is dedicated to boosting oil palm cultivation across the country. Eluru district, with 75,705 hectares dedicated to oil palm cultivation, is a leading region in India's Oil palm production. As part of the Government of India's Mega Oil Palm Plantation Drive under the National Mission on Edible Oils - Oil Palm (NMEO-OP), efforts are being made to enhance oil palm cultivation to achieve self-reliance in edible oil production. On 18 August 2023 Godrej Agrovet Ltd. (GAVL) supported this initiative by organizing a plantation drive in Chintampalle, involving 200 farmers from Andhra Pradesh and Telangana. GAVL has also inaugurated an edible oil refinery in Chintalapudi and allocated 47,000 acres in Telangana for expanded cultivation and processing.

=== Economic Impact of COVID-19 ===
The COVID-19 lockdown had a profound impact on the economy of Eluru. Over 51,500 workers across 23 sectors faced income loss during the lockdown. Additionally, approximately 20,000 weavers, fishermen, tailors, artisans, and self-employed individuals experienced significant disruptions to their livelihoods. The situation was exacerbated by the fact that Eluru, despite constituting only 5.5% of the district's population, reported over 40% of the district's COVID-19 cases, with 7,000 cases in the town, including 6,000 from its slums, which were particularly vulnerable. The economic strain led many workers from the unorganised sector to turn to reselling liquor, purchased from reopened wine shops, to cope with income loss and mounting loan interests. Despite the central government's moratorium on house rents and loan interests, many individuals faced future financial burdens and were forced to take hand loans, risking vehicle seizures and further jeopardizing their livelihoods. Building workers in Eluru, numbering around 6,000, were severely affected due to a sand policy crisis that halted sand mining and compounded by the pandemic. Additionally, the retail and service sectors suffered greatly; approximately 8,000 mall workers lost their jobs and wages, while around 5,000 housemaids were left unpaid and faced reduced work opportunities, often being asked to work outside their employers' homes, leading to further economic distress.

== Culture ==
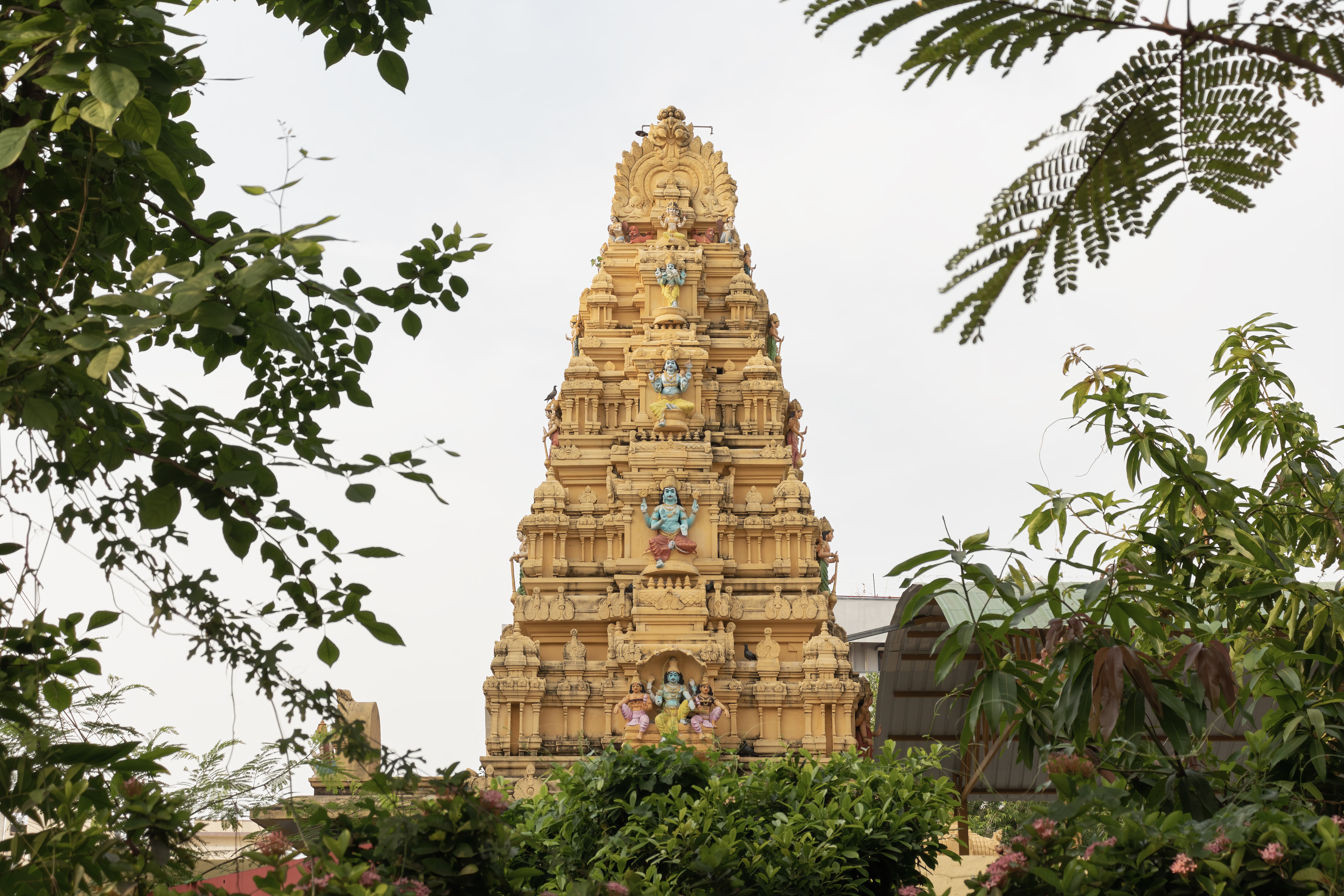
Lord Venkateswara Temple in RR Pet

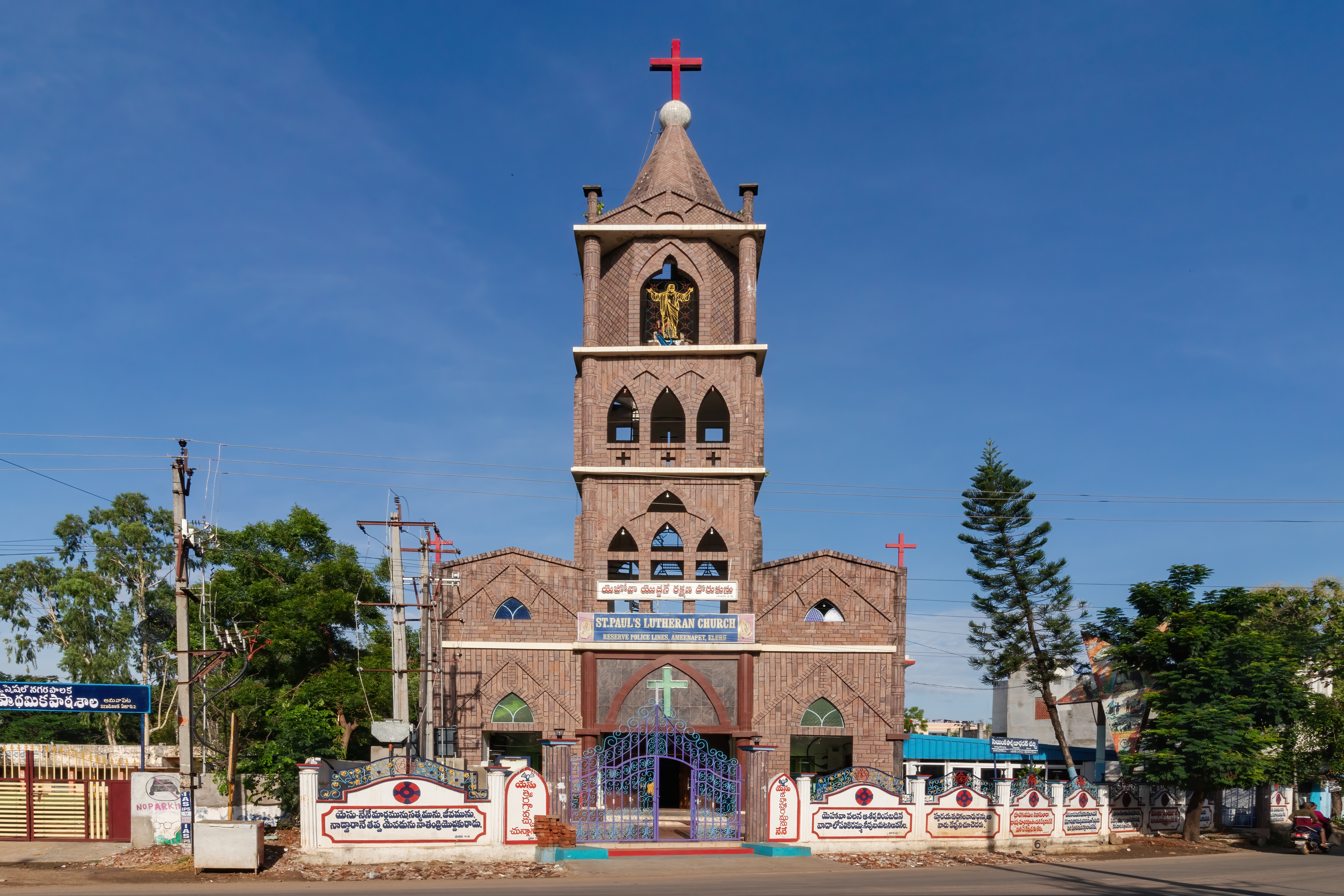
St. Paul's Lutheran Church near Ameenapet Police Quarters

Eluru, once a prominent seat of the Chalukya kings, has a new museum dedicated to showcasing its rich historical artifacts. It is located at Goreela Badi on the eastern street of I-town and will feature copper plates from the 7th, 8th, and 9th centuries, discovered during excavations at Jain sites such as Gandigudem and Pulla. Additionally, idols from Chalukya period Jain temples, including those from Kota Sattemma and Peddintlamma temples, will be displayed. Efforts are also underway to move prehistoric tools from the Kakinada museum to Eluru; these tools, dating from the Paleolithic to Neolithic ages, were originally found in Pedavegi and Jangareddygudem. The new museum will seek permission to transfer Chalukya period inscriptions from Chennai, which document early Telugu usage.

Notable landmarks include the ancient Helapuri Samskrita Pathasala and prominent temples like Janardhana and Jalapaharesvara, with major festivals such as Sankara Jayanti, Ramakoti Utsavam, and Tyagaraja Aradhana attracting thousands of visitors. Dwaraka Tirumala, also known as Chinna Tirupathi, is a significant Hindu temple dedicated to Lord Venkateswara Swamy, situated on Seshadri Hill. The temple is renowned for its self-manifested idol of Sri Venkateswara Swamy, discovered by the saint Dwaraka. It is located 38.63 kilometers from Eluru and 19.31 kilometers from Bhimadole Railway Station. The temple is carved into the hill and includes a five-storey gopuram at the entrance. The Kalyanotsavam, an eight-day festival held in April–May, attracts thousands of devotees. Pedavegi, formerly known as Vengi, is located 11.3 kilometers from Eluru and was once the capital of the Salankayanas, Vishnukundins, and Eastern Chalukyas. Now a small village, it retains archaeological remains, including a large well in the fortress where it is believed that women sacrificed themselves during enemy invasions. Eluru Ashram, or Nam Datta Natha Kshetra, is linked to the Datta Peetham and includes a small temple with idols of Lord Dattatreya and Anagha Devi. The ashram also houses a spacious prayer hall and a Guru Nilayam.

=== Cityscape ===
Aerial view of Buddha Park

Eluru Buddha Park is in the city and is notable for its 74 ft (23 m) Buddha statue in the Abhaya posture, in the heart of Gaja Vallivari Cheruvu tank which was used as drinking water source for elephants in the Ancient Era.

Kolleru Lake is a very large (30,855 hectares [100 sq mi] to 90,100 hectares [300 sq mi]) but shallow fresh-water lake, about 15 km from the city. The lake is known for attracting migratory birds from Northern Europe and Northern Asia during the months of October–March and is designated as the Kolleru Bird Sanctuary. As of 2018, the water level has been low in recent years.

The "Holy Land" of Israel has been replicated on the premises of Fr. Silvio Pasquali Memorial Convent at Duggirala on the city outskirts.

- Archeology Survey Museum
- Guntupalli Group of Buddhist Monuments
- Sultan Quli mosque
- Sanivarapupeta temple
- S.V. Rangarao statue

== Transport and connectivity ==
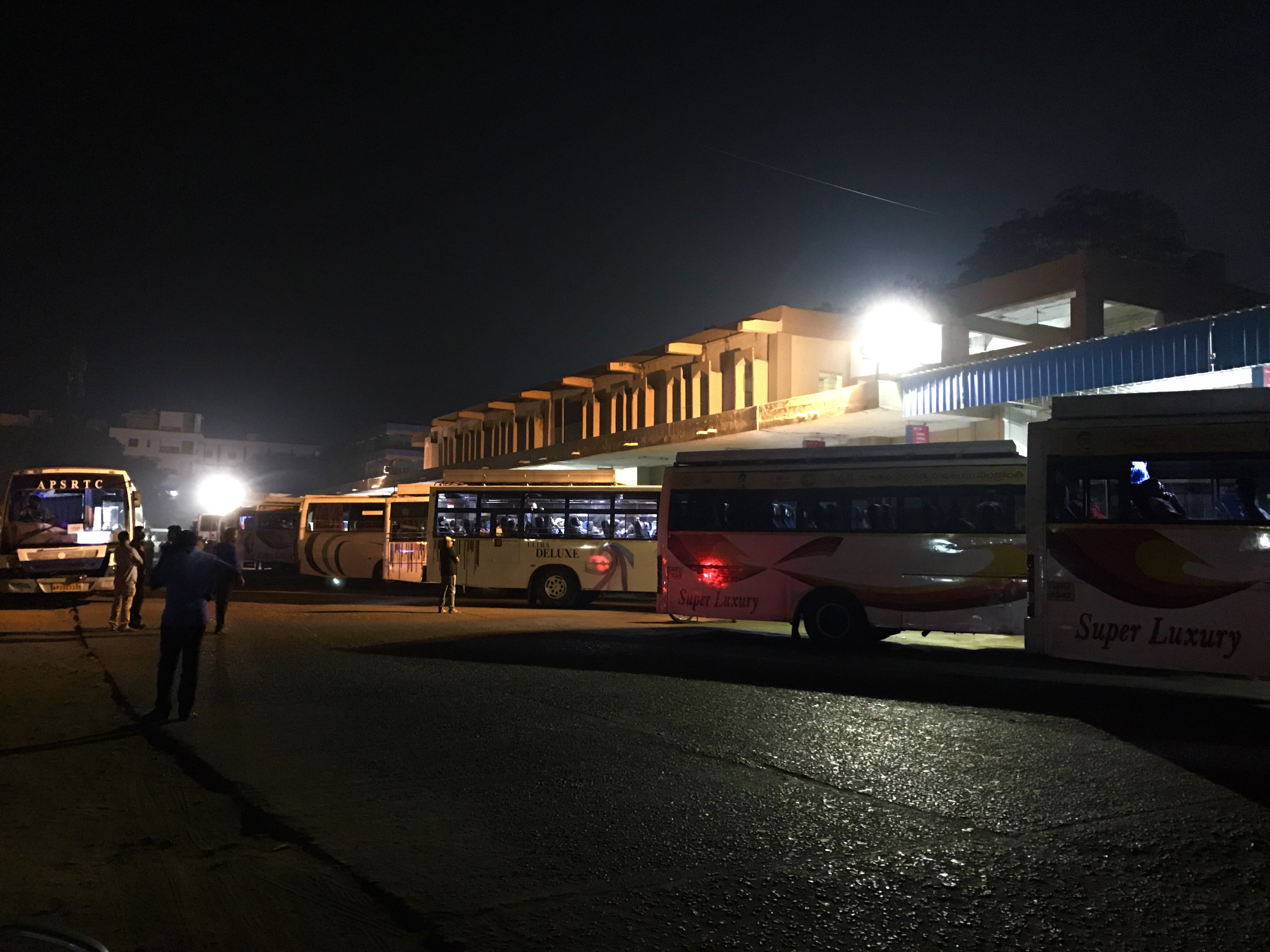
Eluru New bus station

Eluru has a diverse transportation system that includes auto rickshaws, bicycles, buses, and trains. Historically, the city had struggled with traffic congestion, particularly around railway gates at Vatluru, Venkatraopet, Powerpet, old bus stand, and Eastern Locks. This issue was due to the National Highway passing through the city, leading to significant traffic delays as vehicles rushed to cross railway gates both within the city and its outskirts. In response, the government constructed a mini bypass road connecting Eastern Locks and Vatluru. Despite these efforts, traffic problems persisted, partly due to the increase in vehicle numbers using the bypass road, which was originally part of the Golden Quadrilateral programme completed in the late 1990s. The traffic on this road has nearly doubled since its completion. Efforts to manage the congestion included constructing an underbridge at Venkatraopet, a railway overbridge at the old bus stand, and replacing the footbridge at Powerpet with a new bridge. Eluru's road network spans approximately 227.09 kilometers. Major routes include National Highway 16, the Grand National Trunk road, and the mini-bypass roads. Plans are underway to expand the mini-bypass road into a four-lane road to improve connectivity with nearby suburbs. The Grand National Trunk road is a 15-kilometer, six-lane road, while the Bypass road (NH-16) was expanded into a 6-lane road to ease traffic between Eluru and Vijayawada. Key arterial roads include Sanivarapupeta road, Ramachandra Rao Pet main road, Powerpet Station road, Court Centre Road, Rama Mahal Centre Road, ASR Stadium road, Kannaya Park Road, and Kotadibba Road.

Eluru city has approximately 522,000 registered vehicles, with motorcycles being the most common, making up 77% of the total. Goods vehicles account for 12%, and auto rickshaws represent 5%. The city lacks a dedicated bus transport system and relies on APSRTC buses for intercity travel though its old and new bus stations. Auto rickshaws are the only available intermediate public transit, with 25,278 autos operating in the city. Footpaths are in poor condition and many locations lack zebra crossings. Despite urban areas in the former West Godavari district contributing 62% to walking and cycling, and 50% of places being within a cyclable distance. Eluru has 93 traffic centres, including 10 major junctions, but only 4 of these junctions are equipped with traffic signals.

Eluru is classified as an 'A–category station' in the Vijayawada railway division of South Coast Railway zone. Apart from the main station, other stations that serve the city include Powerpet, Denduluru and Vatluru. All these stations are on the Howrah-Chennai main line. Vijayawada is the nearest airport to the city. Indian National Waterway 4 (NW-4) is under development. It runs along the East Coast through Kakinada, Rajahmundry, Eluru, Commanur, Buckingham Canal, and part of the Krishna and Godavari rivers in South India.

== Sports ==
Aerial view of Alluri Sita Ramaraju (ASR Stadium)

Cricket and soccer are the most popular sports in the city. Presently, the city has four stadium out of which Indoor Stadium and ASR Stadium hosted for Ranji Trophy in 1977. Other popular stadiums are Helapuri grounds, C.R. Reddy Cricket Stadium.

=== Alluri Sitarama Raju Stadium ===
ASR stadium is located at 16°43′8″N 81°6′58″E. It had earlier hosted a Ranji Trophy match, handball, football and hockey tournaments. The ground first held a single first-class match in 1976 when Andhra Pradesh played Hyderabad in the 1976/77 Ranji Trophy, which ended in a draw. It held Finals of Football League of West Godavari Matches in 2016. Current DSDO is Syed Azeez.

== Education ==
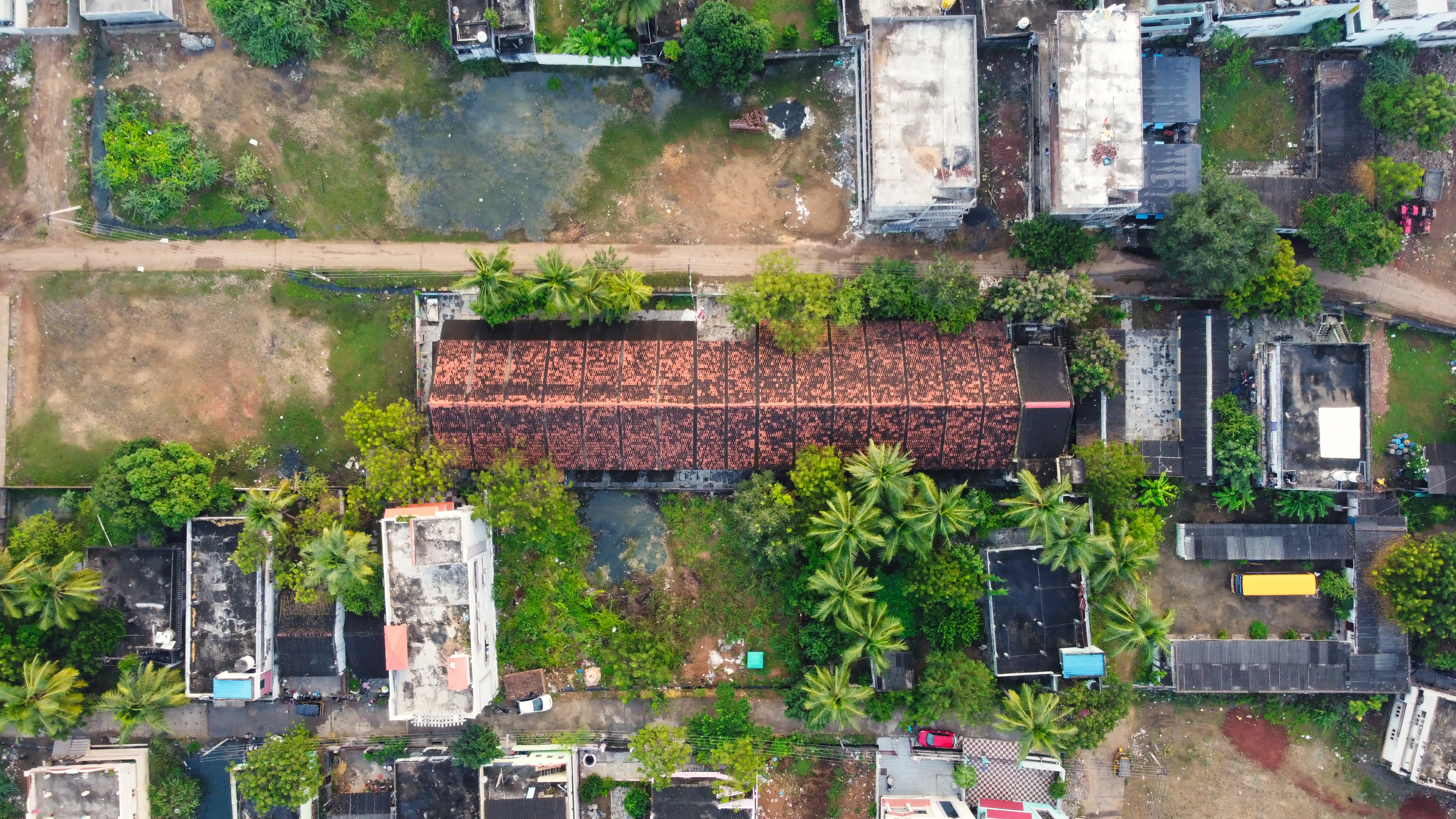
Aerial view of Siddhartha school in Tangellamudi

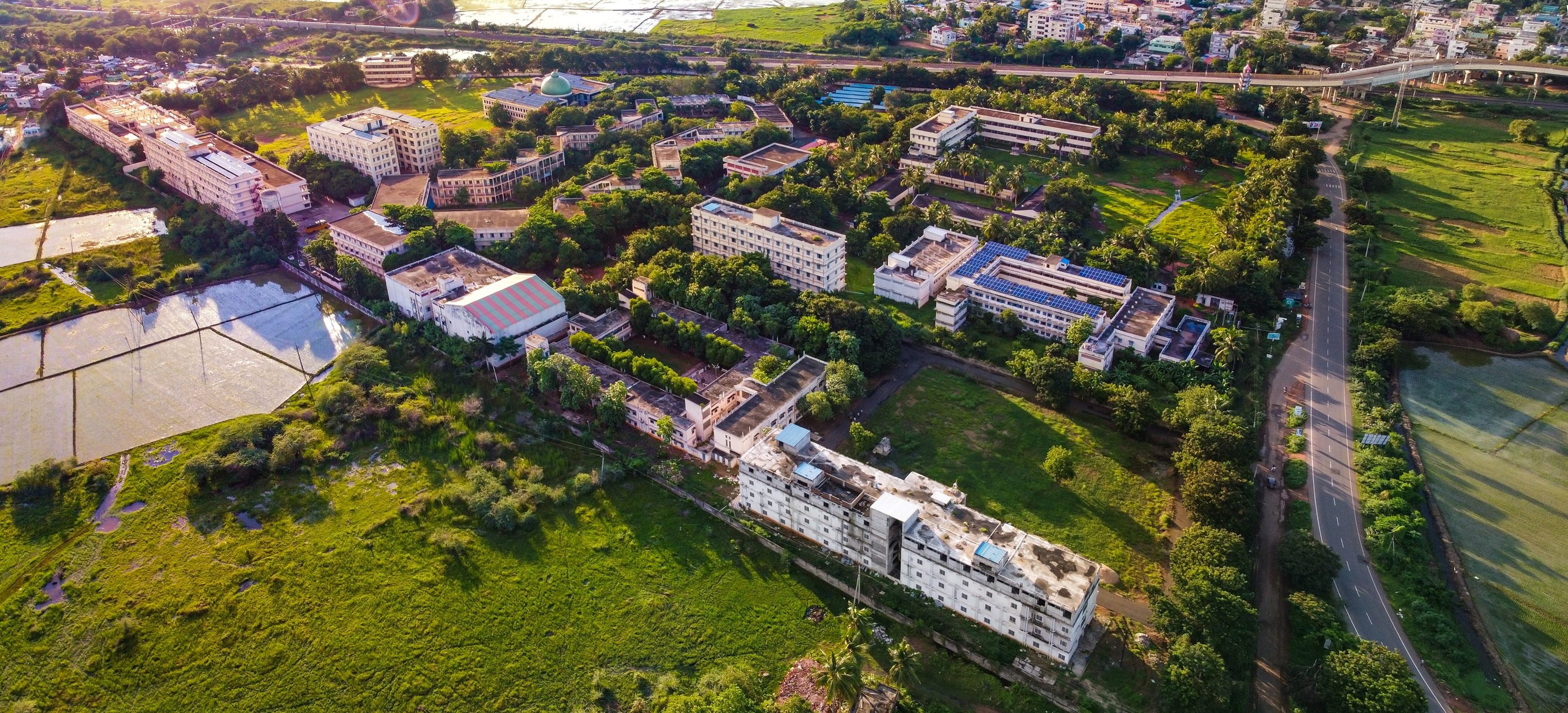
Sir C.R.Reddy College of Engineering

Eluru plays a major role in education for urban and rural students from nearby villages. It has an average literacy rate of 83.90% with, according to the 2011 census, a total number of 155,894 who are literate. This includes, 80,434 men (88.13%) and 75,460 women (79.82%). By the late 1850s, the Church Missionary Society had established several schools in Eluru, including the Church Mission High School, which began in 1854. This school was later taken over by the Eluru Municipality in 1920 and converted into a Government Junior College, significantly advancing local education. Additionally, the Government started a Taluk School in Eluru in 1858, though it was eventually closed due to rivalry with the Church Mission High School. National College of Eluru was inaugurated by Mahatma Gandhi in 1921 as a part of 50 national schools established across Andhra.

Primary and secondary school education is provided by government, aided, and private schools, under the School Education Department of Andhra Pradesh. According to the school information report for the academic year 2016–17, the urban area has around 160 schools. These include government, residential, private, municipal, and other types of schools. There are more than 100 private schools and 49 municipal schools. There are more than 30,000 students in these schools.

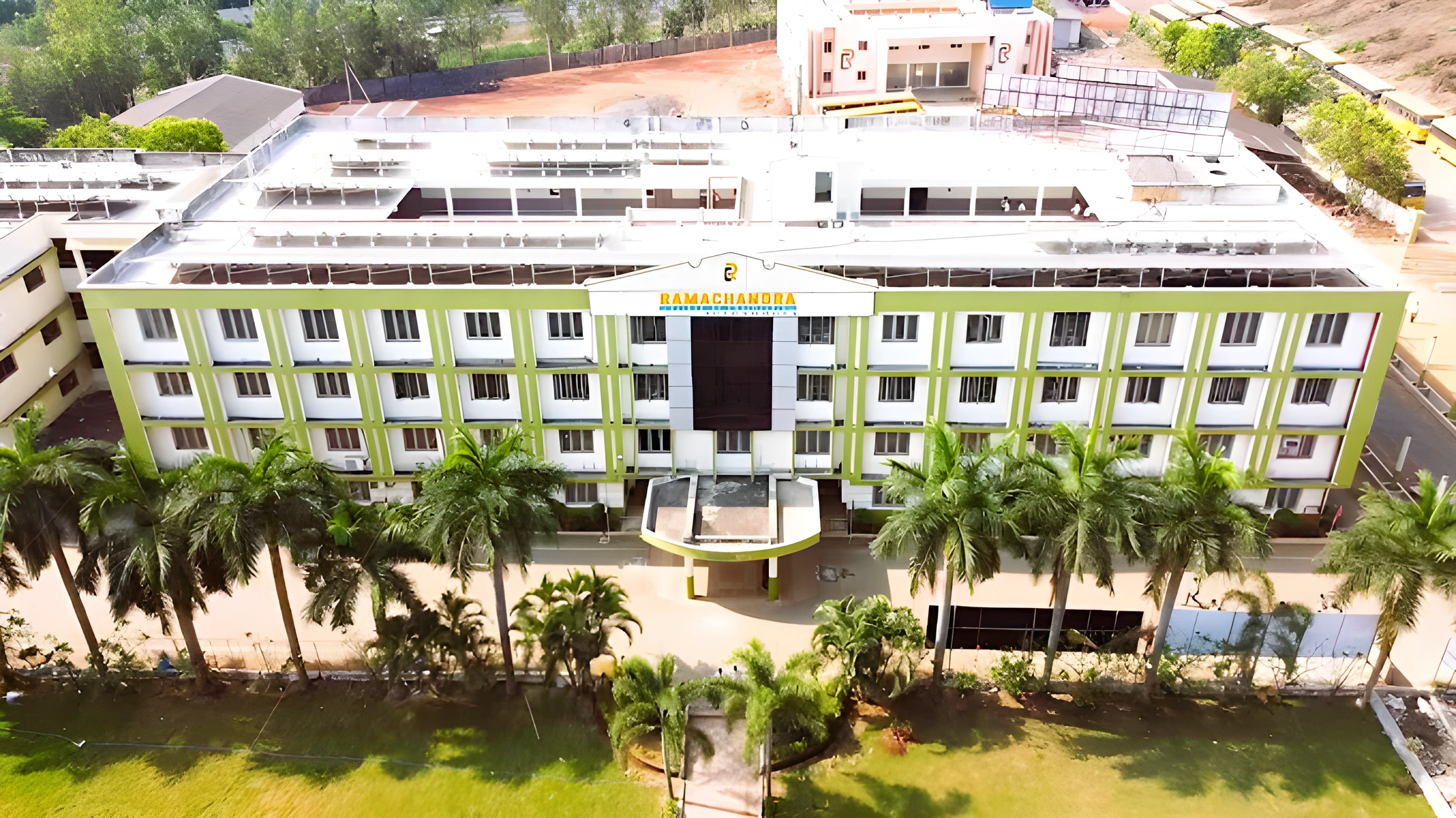
Ramachandra College of Engineering, Eluru

Sri Chintalapati Varaprasada Murthy Raju was the founder of Chintalpati Satyavathi Devi College (St. Therisa College) and three high schools in the name of Indian freedom fighters: Kasturiba Girls High School, Balagangadhar Tilak Oriental for Sanskrit, Duggirala Gopal Krishnayya. Moulana Abdul Kalam Azad High School (the only school with Urdu as medium of instruction in the district). The Central Board of Secondary Education, Secondary School Certificate, or the Indian Certificate of Secondary Education are the types of syllabus followed by schools.

The government plans to set up Municipal Corporation Junior College in the city. Eluru city has ASRAM Medical college, Sir C.R. Reddy Educational Institutions, St Joseph Dental College, Eluru College of Engineering and Technology, Ramachandra College of Engineering, Helapuri Institute of Engineering and Science are Engineering colleges present in and around Eluru.

== Research Institutions ==
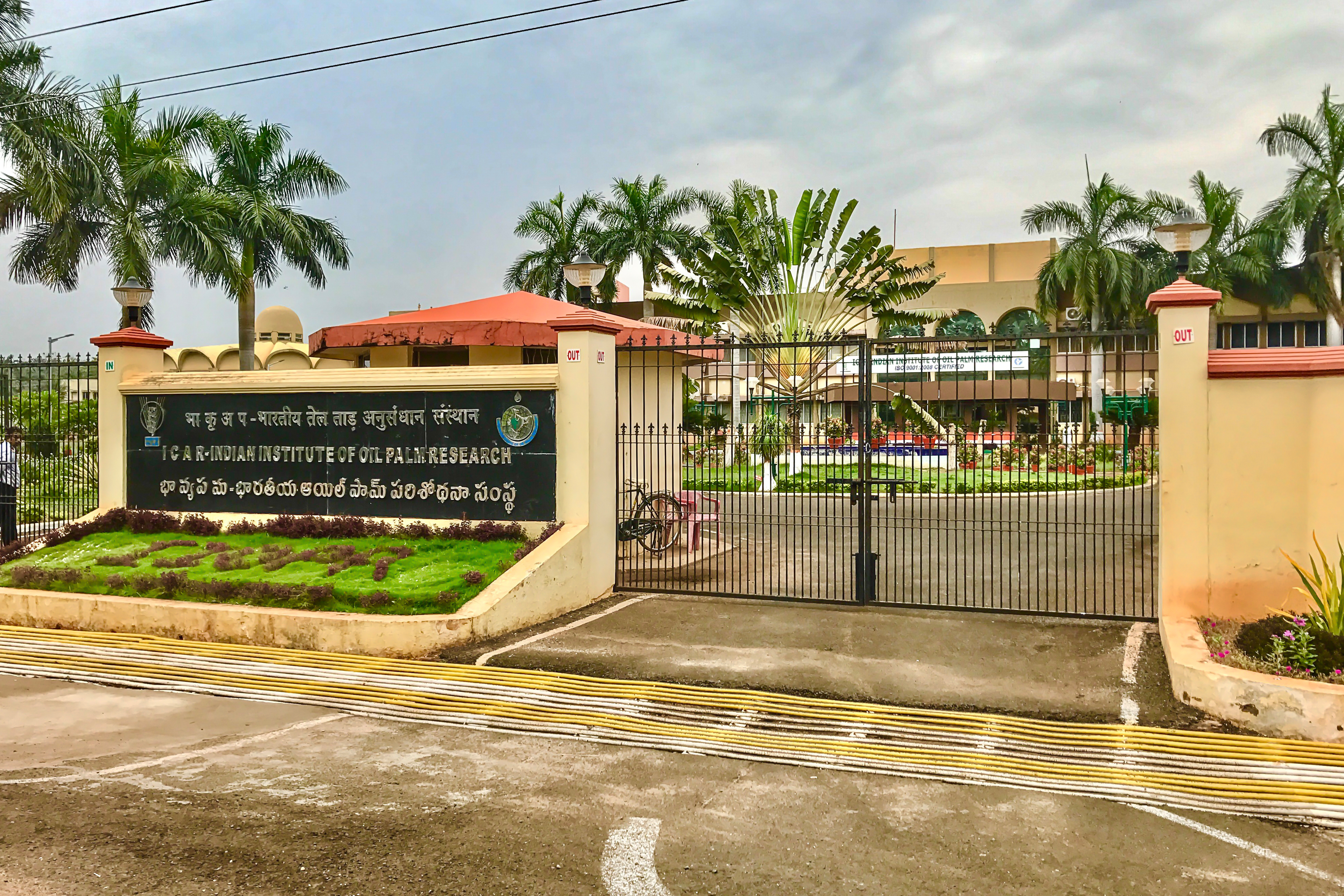
Indian Institute of Oil Palm Research

The city is home to the Indian Institute of Oil Palm Research. On 19 February 1995, the Indian Council of Agricultural Research established the National Research Centre for Oil Palm (later renamed the Directorate of Oil Palm Research) in Pedavegi. In November 2014, the institute was upgraded to the Indian Institute of Oil Palm Research (IIOPR) to address the oil palm research needs across the country. IIOPR now functions as a hub for conducting and coordinating research on all aspects of oil palm, including conservation, improvement, production, protection, post-harvest technology, and technology transfer.

== Notable people ==
Eluru has made significant contributions to Indian film and arts through several notable personalities.

- Arvind Krishna – Chairman and CEO of IBM
- Chodagam Ammanna Raja – Indian freedom movement activist; Rajya Sabha member
- Duvvuri Subbarao – Economist; 22nd Governor of the Reserve Bank of India
- Kommareddi Suryanarayana – Rajya Sabha and Lok Sabha member in Indian Parliament; Indian freedom activist
- Kurma Venkata Reddy Naidu – Lawyer; professor; Justice Party leader; Governor and Chief Minister of Madras Presidency
- L. V. Prasad – Film producer; actor; director; cinematographer; businessman
- Mothey Vedakumari – Parliamentarian; singer
- Muhammad Shahabuddin – Judge, Federal Court of Pakistan; Governor, East Pakistan
- Naga Shaurya – Film actor
- Pawan Kumar – Former cricketer for Andhra and Hyderabad
- Pasupuleti Kannamba – Actress; playback singer; film producer of Telugu cinema
- Sekhar Kammula – Film director; screenwriter; producer
- Silk Smitha – Film actress
- Sitaram Rao Valluri – Engineer and Scientist
- V. N. Aditya – Film director; screenwriter
- Vijaya Bapineedu – Magazine editor; film screenwriter; director
- V. S. Ramadevi – First woman to become Chief Election Commissioner of India

== See also ==
- List of cities in Andhra Pradesh
- Kolleru Bird Sanctuary
