= Sanivarapupeta =

- Census Town
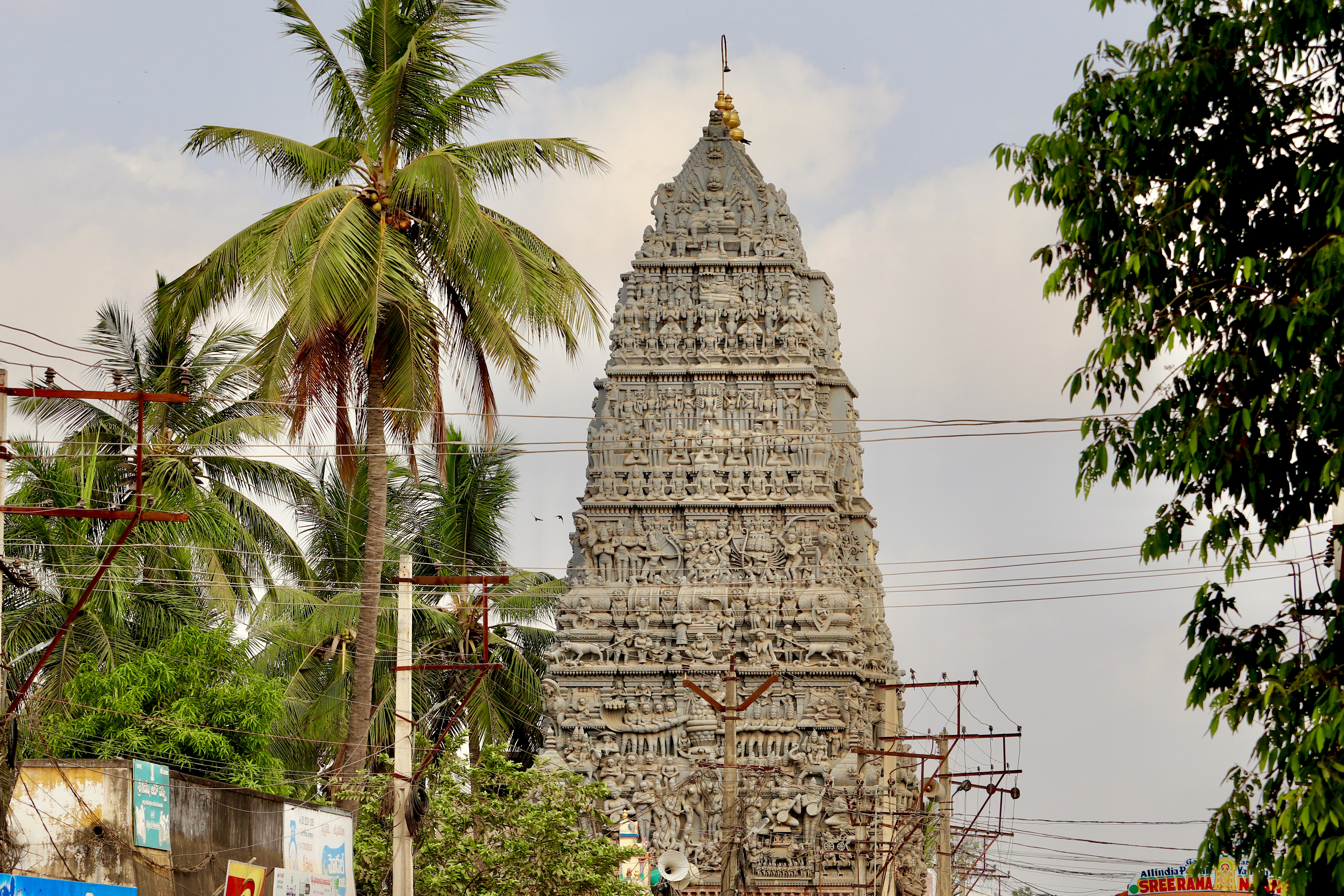
- Sri Chennakeswara Swamy Temple in Sanivarapupeta

- Location in Andhra Pradesh, India
- Coordinates: 16.7273°N 81.0772°E
- Country: India
- State: Andhra Pradesh
- District: Eluru

Government
  - Body: Census Town

Area
  - Total: 1.70 km^{2} (0.66 sq mi)

Population (2011)
  - Total: 8,142
  - Density: 4,790/km^{2} (12,400/sq mi)

Languages
  - Official: Telugu
- Time zone: UTC+5:30 (IST)
- PIN: 534 003
- Vehicle registration: AP-37

Sanivarapupeta is a census town in Eluru district of the Indian state of Andhra Pradesh. It is located in Eluru mandal of Eluru revenue division. The town is a constituent of Eluru urban agglomeration.

== Demographics ==
As of 2011 census of India, Sanivarapupeta had a population of 8,142. The total population constitute, 4,112 males and 4,030 females —a sex ratio of 980 females per 1000 males. 822 children are in the age group of 0–6 years with child sex ratio of 1090 girls per 1000 boys. The average literacy rate stands at 85.25% with 6,240 literates.

== Transport ==
Sanivarapupeta is well connected by road. Sanivarapupeta road had been upgraded into 4 Lane (60 Feet) road by Municipal Corporation.

== Education ==
The primary and secondary school education is imparted by government, aided and private schools, under the School Education Department of the state.
