= Eluru Buddha Park =

Buddha Statue of Eluru
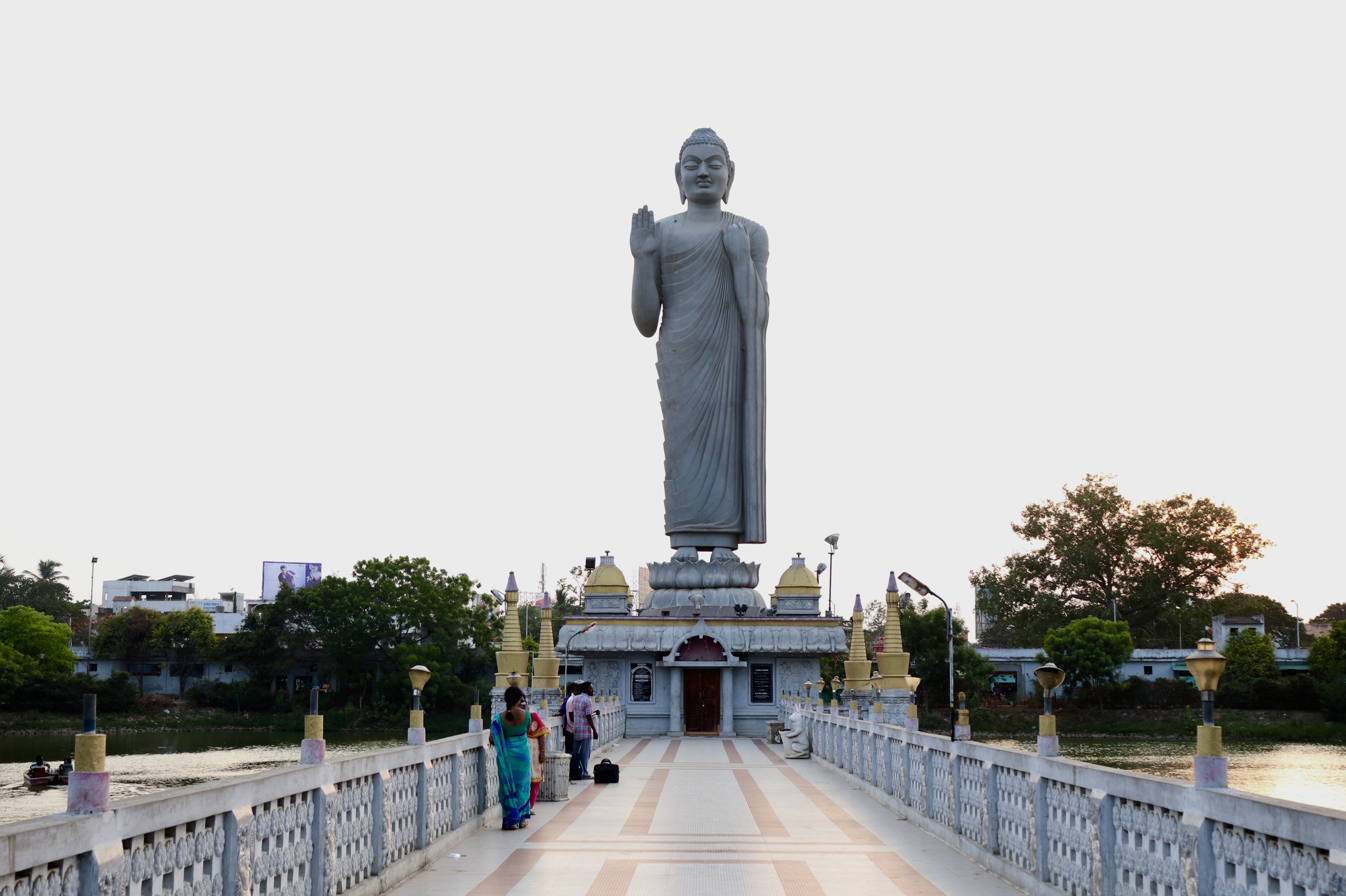
- Standing Buddha in abhya mudra

- Location of Buddha Statue in Eluru
- 16°42′30″N 81°06′45″E
- Location: Eluru, India

History
- Dedicated: 5 May 2013

Site notes
- Height: 74 ft (23 m)
- Governing body: Eluru Municipal Corporation

Gaja Vallivari Cheruvu is one of the ancient ponds in the history of Helapuri town (the ancient name of Eluru city). During the Chalukyan period, elephants used to drink water from this pond. Eluru is the former capital of the Vengi Dynasty. Between 11A.D.

== Buddha statue ==
A magnificent 74 feet Buddha statue was constructed in the middle of the pond named Gajjalavari Cheruvu, and a painting gallery was also created to spread the Buddha’s teachings. The pedestal is decorated with famous Amaravathi sculptures along the footbridge railings up to the statue. It was opened by Nallari Kiran Kumar Reddy, who served as the Last Chief Minister of United Andhra Pradesh.

== See also ==
- List of tallest statues
- List of statues
