= Exhibition Ground, Eluru =

Cricket ground in Eluru, India

Coordinates: 16°42′40.27″N 81°05′25.66″E

Exhibition Grounds
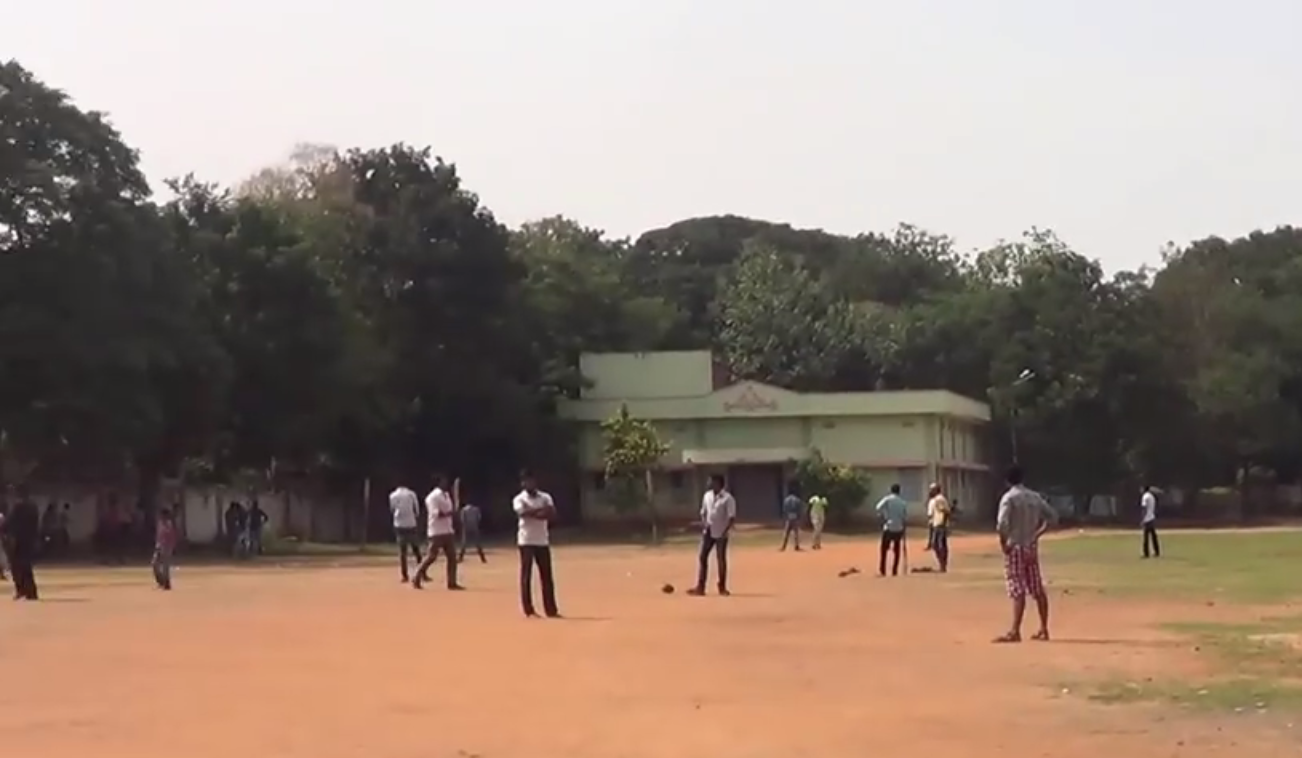
- Interactive map of Exhibition Grounds

Ground information
- Location: Eluru, India
- Country: India
- Establishment: 1976 (first recorded match)

Team information
Andhra Pradesh	(1976)
- As of 10 November 2011; Source: Ground profile

The Exhibition Ground is a cricket ground in Eluru, Andhra Pradesh, India. The ground first held a single first-class match in 1976 when Andhra Pradesh played Hyderabad in the 1976/77 Ranji Trophy, which ended in a draw.
