= CMR Central, Visakhapatnam =

CMR Central
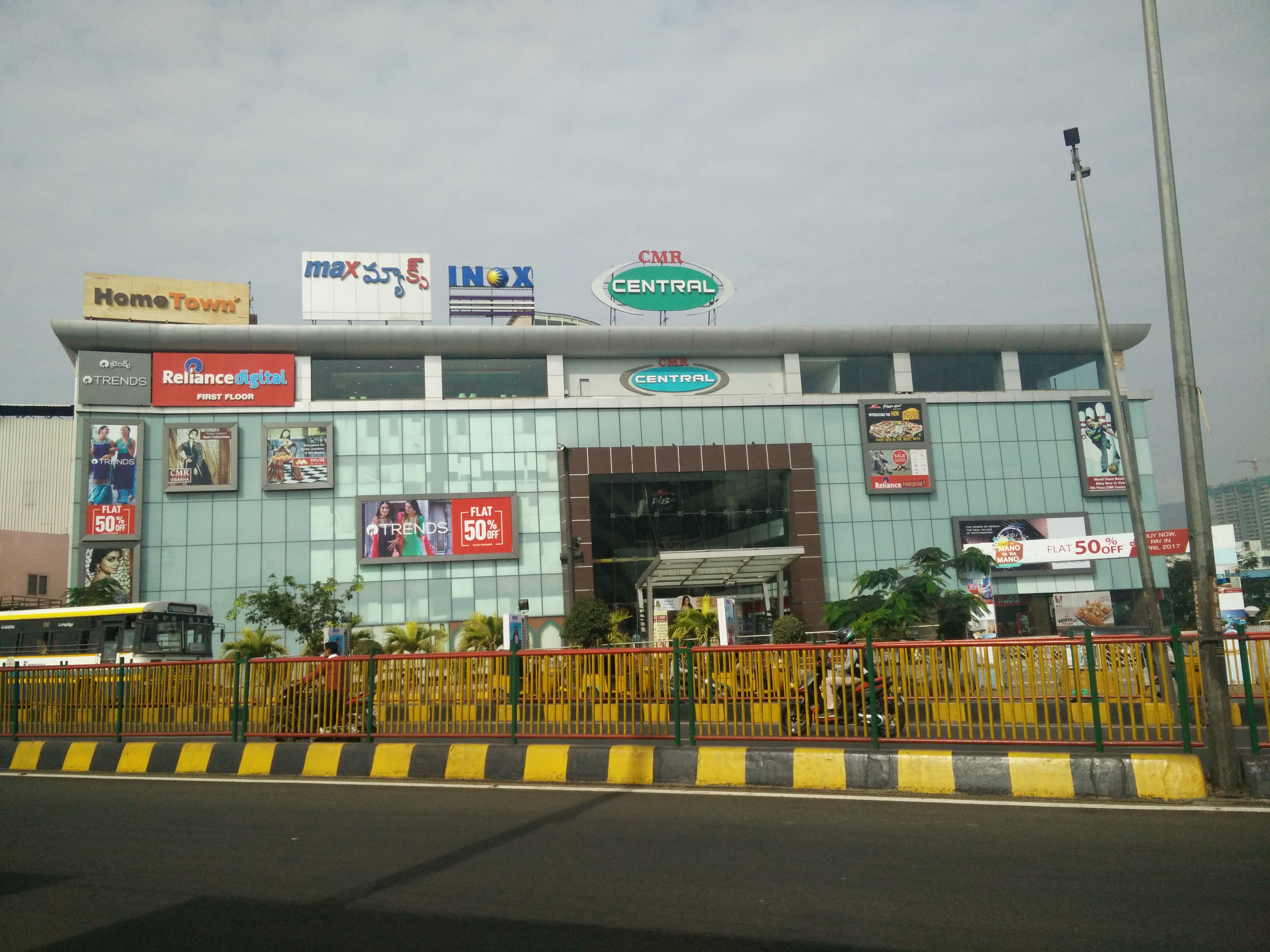
- Location: Maddilapalem, Visakhapatnam, India
- Coordinates: 17.734111°N 83.318264°E
- Opened: January 2010
- Owner: CMR
- Floor area: 72,000
- Floors: 6
- Parking: 2-level basement parking
- Website: cmrcentral.in

CMR Central is a shopping centre located in Maddilapalem, Visakhapatnam. It was developed by CMR Shopping Mall Private Limited.

== Description ==
Renowned as one of the biggest malls in Visakhapatnam, CMR Central opened on 2 January 2010 with 6 floors of retail space. It has a total built-up area of 72,000 square feet and is spread over 5 floors. From apparel to electronics to food to home furniture, CMR Central houses all major commodities. Located in Maddilapalem, CMR Central is one of the popular landmarks in Vizag that is located in the heart of the city. It contains outlets of major clothing and apparel brands, a gaming zone, a bowling alley, a large number of restaurants and even a four-screen multiplex cinema.

== Entertainment ==
CMR Central features a four screen INOX cinema.

== Events ==
CMR Central has functioned as a venue for many events in the city. In the past, many popular celebrities like Sai Ramesh have graced this place. This mall has also hosted various music events like Battle of the Bands, charity events, fashion walks and beauty contests.
