= Chintampalle =

- Village
- Interactive map of Chintampalle
- Location in Andhra Pradesh, India
- Coordinates: 17.188927°N 80.928881°E
- Country: India
- State: Andhra Pradesh
- District: Eluru

Population (2011)
  - Total: 1,808

Languages
- Time zone: UTC+5:30 (IST)
- PIN: 534460
- Telephone code: 08823
- Vehicle registration: AP

Chintampalle is a village in Eluru district of the Indian state of Andhra Pradesh . It is administered under Eluru revenue division.

== Demographics ==
Chintampalle has population of 1808 of which 921 are males while 887 are females as per Population Census 2011. In the village population of children with age 0-6 is 160. Average Sex Ratio of the village is 963 which is higher than Andhra Pradesh state average of 993. Child Sex Ratio of the village is 831 as per census, higher than Andhra Pradesh average of 939. The village has higher literacy rate compared to Andhra Pradesh. In 2011, its literacy rate was 59.16% compared to 67.02% of Andhra Pradesh.
