= Rajamahendravaram Rural mandal =

- Mandal
- Interactive Map Outlining mandal
- Location in Andhra Pradesh, India
- Coordinates: 16.879926°N 81.671284°E
- Country: India
- State: Andhra Pradesh
- District: East Godavari
- Headquarters: Rajahmundry

Area
  - Total: 75.15 km^{2} (29.02 sq mi)

Population (2011)
  - Total: 166,973
  - Density: 2,222/km^{2} (5,755/sq mi)

Languages
  - Official: Telugu
- Time zone: UTC+5:30 (IST)

Rajamahendravaram Rural mandal, is one of the 19 mandals in East Godavari district of the state of Andhra Pradesh, India. The mandal is bounded by Seethanagaram mandal, Korukonda mandal, Rajanagaram mandal, Kadiam mandal and Atreyapuram mandal.

== Demographics ==
As of 2011 census, the mandal had a population of 166,973. The total population constitute, 82,544 males and 84,429 females —a sex ratio of 1023 females per 1000 males. 17,423 children are in the age group of 0–6 years, of which 8,809 are boys and 8,614 are girls —a ratio of 978 per 1000. The average literacy rate stands at 76.49% with 114,391 literates.

== Governance ==
Rajamahendravaram Rural mandal is a part of "Greater Rajamahendravaram Municipal Corporation". List of villages in Rajamahendravaram Rural mandal include:

| No. | Name |
|---|---|
| 1 | Bommuru |
| 2 | Dowleswaram |
| 3 | Hukumpeta |
| 4 | Katheru |
| 5 | Pidim Goyyi |
| 6 | Venkata Nagaram |
| 7 | Rajavolu |
| 8 | Torredu |
| 9 | Lala Cheruvu |

10.Satilit City 11.Vemagiri
