= National Highway 216A (India) =

National Highway in India

National Highway 216A
- Map of the National Highway in red

Route information
- Length: 121 km (75 mi)

Major junctions
- South end: Eluru
- North end: Rajahmundry

Location
- Country: India
- States: Andhra Pradesh

Highway system
- Roads in India; Expressways; National; State; Asian
← NH 16	→ NH 16

National Highway 216A (also known as NH 216A) is a National Highway in the Indian state of Andhra Pradesh. It starts from Rajamahendravaram, passes through Ravulapalem, Tanuku, Tadepalligudem, and terminates at Eluru.

NHAI is constructing flyovers at Diwancheruvu, Lalacheruvu, Morampudi, Vemagiri, Kadiyapulanka, Jonnada Junctions in Rajamahendravaram city. Flyover at Undrajavaram Junction in Tanuku town is also proposed to ease traffic. NH-216A is a spur road of National Highway 16.

== Route length ==
The highway has a total route length of 120.7 kilometres (75.0 mi).

== Junctions ==
Terminal with NH16 at Gondugolanu (Bhimadole)near Eluru.

Terminal with NH16 at Rajamahendravaram.

== See also ==
- List of national highways in India
- List of national highways in India by state
