= Rajamahendravaram =

City in Andhra Pradesh, India

- City
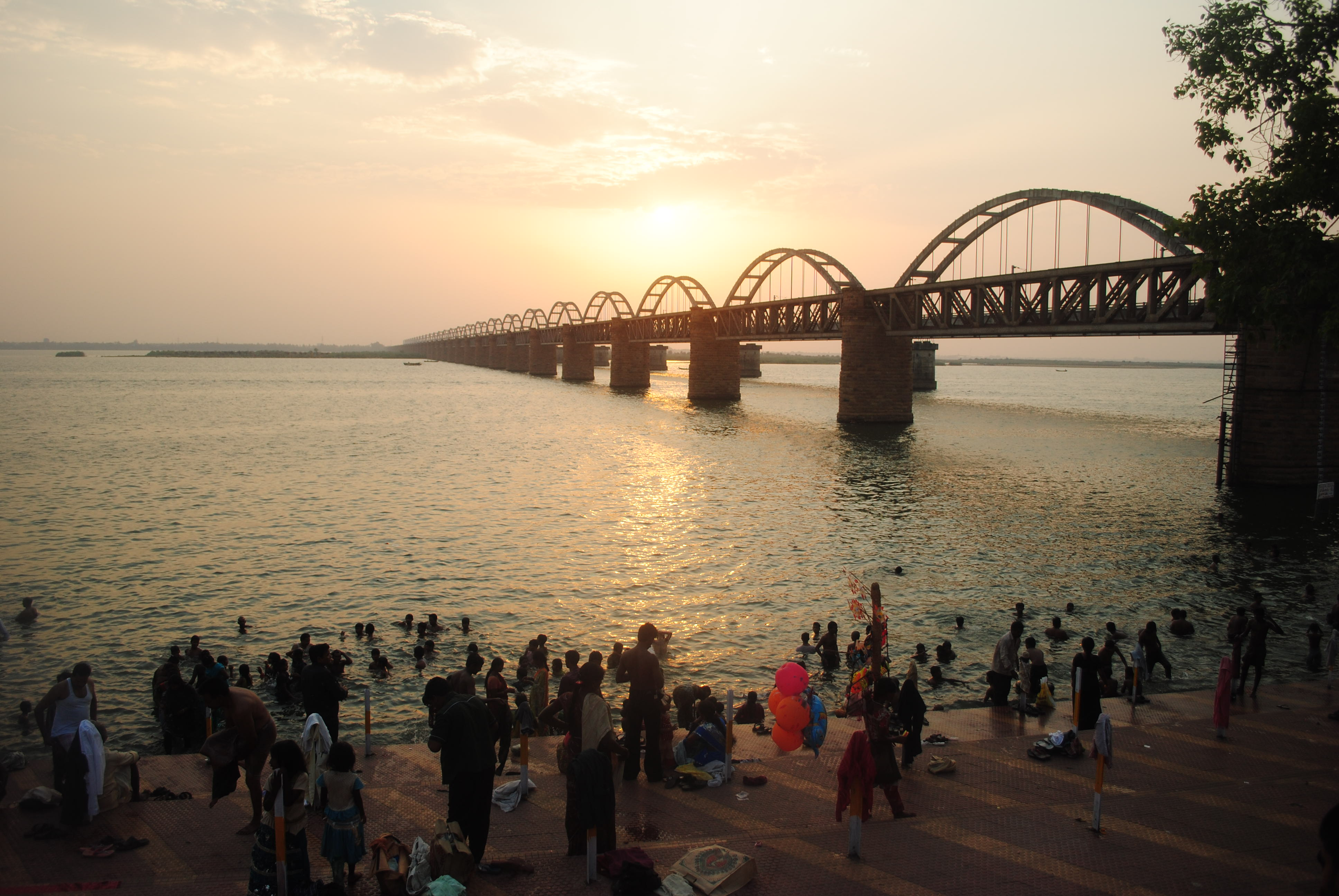
- Sunset over Godavari Arch Bridge
- Nickname: Cultural capital of Andhra Pradesh
- Interactive map of Rajamahendravaram
- Location within Andhra Pradesh
- Coordinates: 17°0′32.816″N 81°46′42.24″E
- Country: India
- State: Andhra Pradesh
- Region: Coastal Andhra
- District: East Godavari
- Founder: Rajaraja Narendra
- Named for: Rajaraja Narendra

Government
  - Type: Municipal Corporation
  - Body: Rajamahendravaram Municipal Corporation (RMC); Rajamahendravaram Urban Development Authority (RUDA)

Area
  - City: 135.50 km^{2} (52.32 sq mi)
- Elevation: 14 m (46 ft)

Population (2011)
  - City: 513,385
  - Metro: 660,000

Languages
  - Official: Telugu
- Time zone: UTC+5:30 (IST)
- PIN: 533 1xx
- Telephone code: +91-883
- Vehicle registration: AP-05 (former)
- Nominal GDP(2023-24): ₹15,693 crore (US$1.7 billion)

Rajamahendravaram, previously known as Rajahmundry (/ˈrɑːdʒəmʌndrɪ/ RAH-juh-mun-dree), is a Tier-2 city in the Indian state of Andhra Pradesh and the district headquarters of the East Godavari district. It is the seventh most populated city in the state.

During British Rule, the district of Rajahmundry was created in the Madras Presidency in 1823. It was reorganised in 1859 and divided into the Godavari and Krishna districts. Rajahmundry was the headquarters of the Godavari district, which was further divided into East Godavari and West Godavari districts in 1925. It is administered under the Rajahmundry revenue division of the East Godavari district.

The city's name originates from Rajaraja Narendra, the 11th-century ruler of the Eastern Chalukya dynasty. In 2015, the city was renamed from Rajahmundry to Rajamahendravaram.

The city is known for its floriculture, history, Telugu literature, culture, agriculture, economy, tourism, and heritage. It is known as the "Cultural Capital of Andhra Pradesh".

== Etymology ==
The city was earlier called Rajamahendravaram, originating from the Sanskrit name Rajamahendrapuram (The city of King Mahendra). Carrying the same meaning, it is also referred to as Rajamahendri. During the Qutb Shahi, Mughal, and Nizam rules, it was known to in government records as Rājmandrī and the same name was adapted during the British colonial era as Rajahmundry. On 10 October 2015, the State Government of Andhra Pradesh officially renamed the city back to its historic name Rajamahendravaram.

== History ==
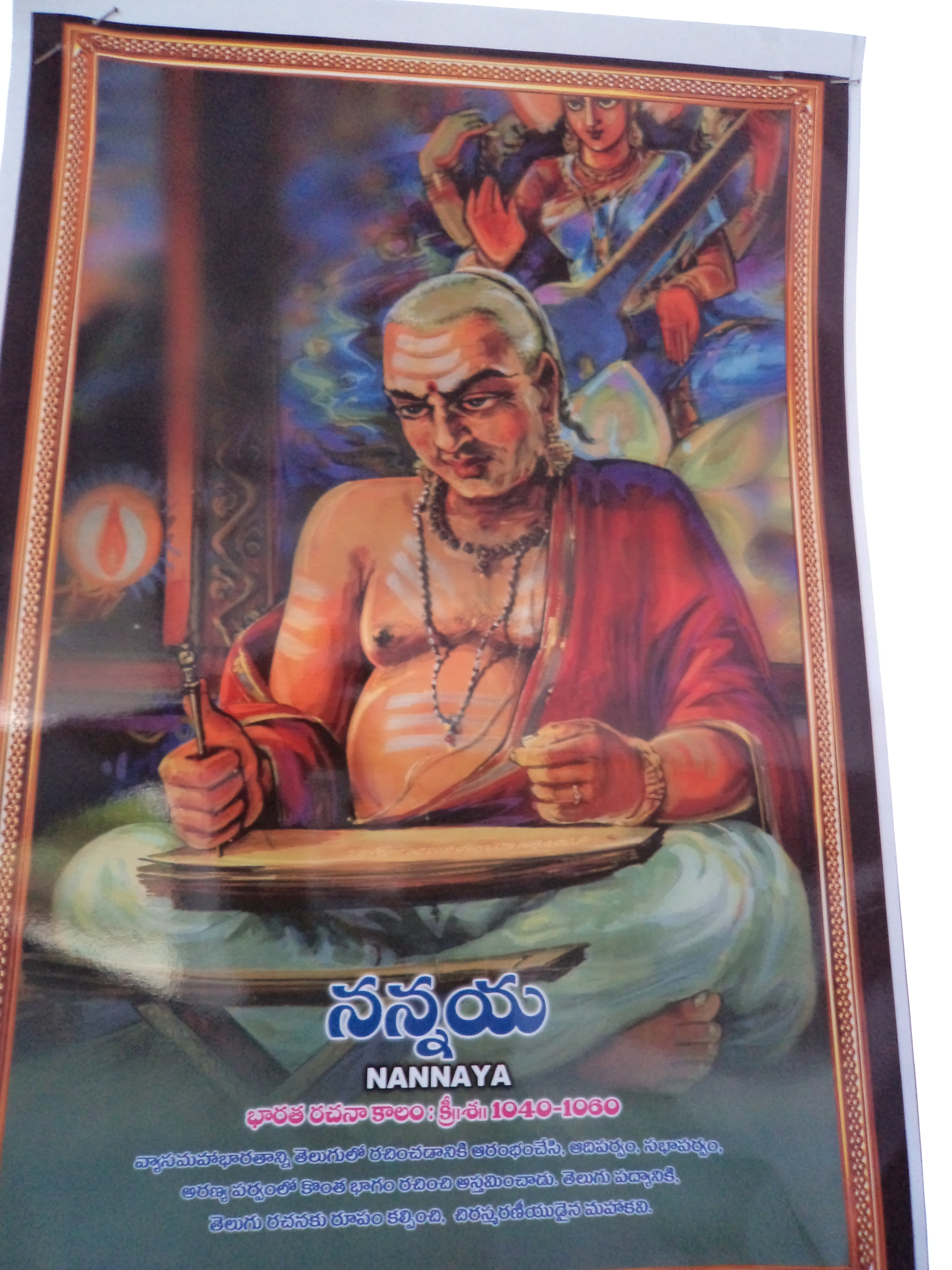
Portrait of Nannayya

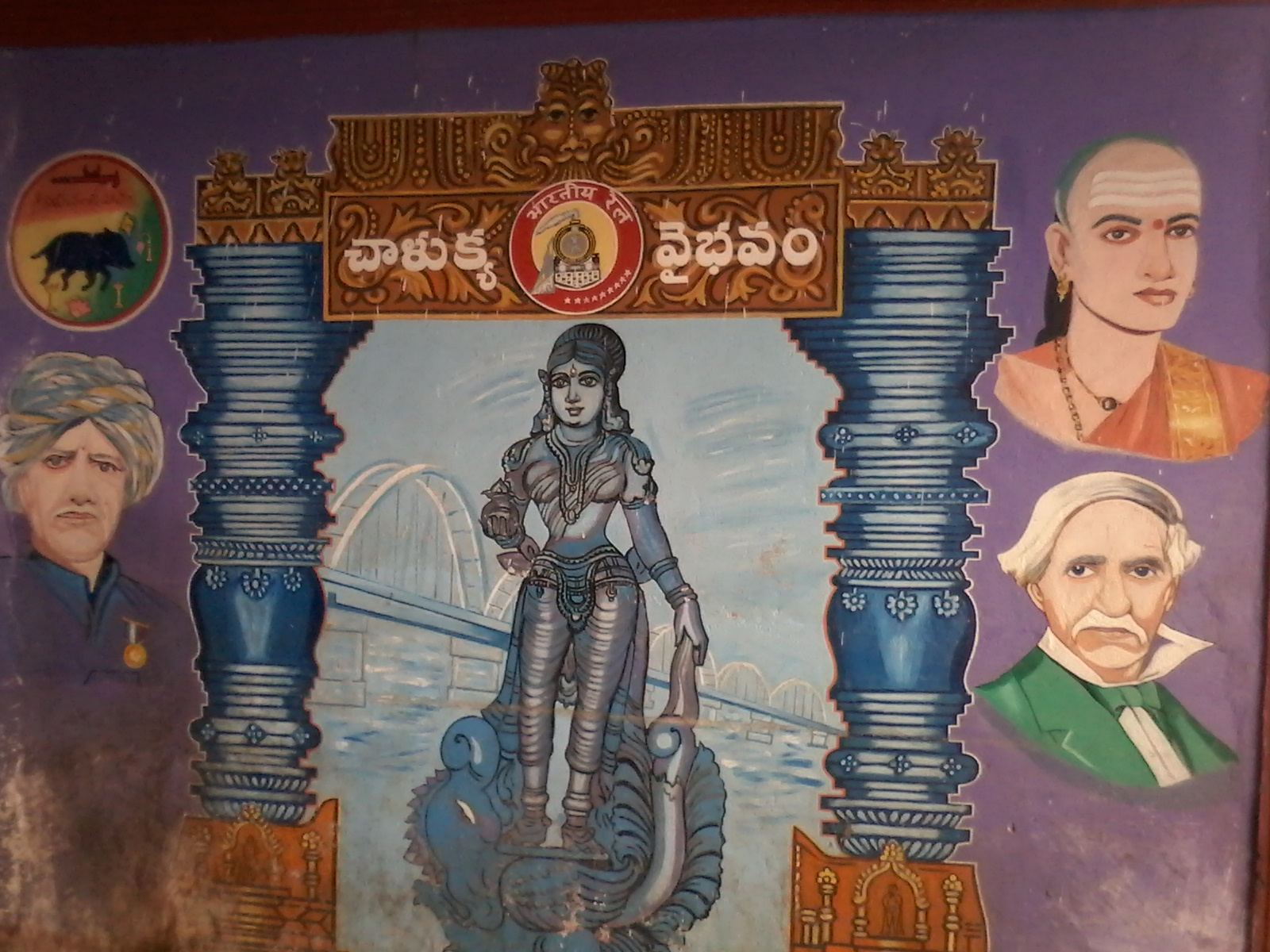
Painting representing historical significance of Rajahmundry city at a wall in Rajahmundry railway station

Rajahmundry was established by Ammaraja Vishnuvardhana the First (919–934 AD). The city as a prominent settlement can be traced back to the rule of the Eastern Chalukya king Rajaraja Narendra, who reigned around 1022 AD. Remains of 11th-century palaces and forts still exist.

Rulers:

- Eastern Chalukyas
- Cholas
- Kakatiyas
- Eastern Ganga Dynasty
- Reddy Kingdom
- Gajapati Empire
- Vijayanagar Empire
- Bahmani Sultanate
- Golconda Sultanate
- Nizam Rule
- British Empire

Rajahmundry was under Dutch rule for some time. In 1602, the Dutch had constructed a fort, and in 1857, the British conquered the Dutch settlement. They converted it into a jail in 1864 and elevated it into a central jail in 1870. The jail is spread over 196 acres (79 ha), out of which the buildings occupy 37.24 acres (15.07 ha).

In the Madras Presidency, the district of Rajahmundry was created in 1823. It was reorganised in 1859 and bifurcated into the Godavari and Krishna districts. During British rule, Rajahmundry was the headquarters of Godavari district, which was further divided into East Godavari and West Godavari in 1925. When the Godavari district was split, Kakinada became the headquarters of East Godavari, and Eluru became the headquarters of the West Godavari district.

Rajahmundry was a hotbed of several movements during India's freedom struggle and acted as a base for many key leaders. When the Indian National Congress had its first meeting in Bombay (Mumbai), two leaders from Rajahmundry, Nyapathi Subba Rao and Kandukuri Veeresalingam, participated in it. Subba Rao, founder of the Hindu Samaj in Rajahmundry, was also one of the six founders of India's noted English daily, The Hindu.

The Renaissance of Andhra Pradesh started in Rajahmundry. Kandukuri Veeresalingam is known as the father of social reforms in Andhra Pradesh. He started a monthly magazine Vivekavardhini, and a school for girls at Dowleswaram in 1874. The first widow remarriage took place on 11 December 1881. A society with 16 members was started on 22 June 1884, which looked after widow remarriages in Rajahmundry. The town hall was established in 1890 by Veeresalingam. Bipin Chandra Pal visited Rajahmundry in April 1905 during the Vandemataram Movement. During his visits, he addressed the public in "Pal Chowk" (the present-day Kotipalli Bus Stand). Annie Besant visited Rajahmundry twice. She first came when the foundations of a branch of the Divya Gyan Samaj at Alcot Gardens were being laid. She returned for the opening ceremony. Ramakrishna Mission was established in the city during 1950–51 near Kambal Tank. The place is now Ayakar Bhavan.

Rajahmundry is acclaimed as the birthplace of Telugu literature—its grammar evolved from the pen of the city-born poet Nannayya. Also known as 'Ādi Kavi' (the first poet) of Telugu, Nannayya, along with Tikkana and Yerrana, translated the Sanskrit version of the Mahabharata into Telugu. Kandukuri Veeresalingam – a social reformer and the author of Rajasekhara Charithram, the first Telugu novel – was also from Rajahmundry.

== Geography ==
Rajahmundry is located at 16.98°N 81.78°E. with an average elevation of 14 metres (46 ft). It is geographically located at the centre of the Godavari districts. Paddy, sugarcane, and various varieties of flowers are cultivated in the area. The River Godavari flows to the west of Rajahmundry. The Rajahmundry Traps, part of the Deccan Traps, are located on the Godavari river and are of particular interest to geologists.

=== Climate ===
The weather is hot and humid, with a tropical climate and, therefore, no distinct seasons. The mean maximum temperature is 32 °C (90 °F). The hottest season is from April to June, with temperatures ranging from 34 °C (93 °F) to 48 °C (118 °F) with a maximum of 52 °C (126 °F) recorded in May 2002 and May 2007. The coolest months are December and January, when it is pleasant at 27 °C (81 °F) to 30 °C (86 °F). There is heavy monsoon rain at the end of summer, with depressions in the Bay of Bengal.

Climate data for Rajahmundry
Month	Jan	Feb	Mar	Apr	May	Jun	Jul	Aug	Sep	Oct	Nov	Dec	Year
Mean daily maximum °C (°F)	28 (82)	30 (86)	34 (93)	38 (100)	40 (104)	37 (99)	34 (93)	33 (91)	32 (90)	31 (88)	28 (82)	27 (81)	33 (91)
Mean daily minimum °C (°F)	19 (66)	21 (70)	23 (73)	27 (81)	29 (84)	27 (81)	26 (79)	25 (77)	25 (77)	24 (75)	21 (70)	18 (64)	24 (75)
Average precipitation mm (inches)	3 (0.1)	6 (0.2)	11 (0.4)	21 (0.8)	67 (2.6)	142 (5.6)	260 (10.2)	187 (7.4)	177 (7.0)	197 (7.8)	37 (1.5)	7 (0.3)	1,115 (43.9)
Source: en.climate-data.org

Rajahmundry has been ranked the 16th best "National Clean Air City" under Category 2 (3-10L population cities) in India.

== Demographics ==
Historical population
Year	Pop.	±%
1871	19,738	—
1881	24,555	+24.4%
1891	28,397	+15.6%
1901	36,408	+28.2%
1911	48,417	+33.0%
1921	53,791	+11.1%
1931	63,526	+18.1%
1941	74,564	+17.4%
1951	105,276	+41.2%
1961	130,002	+23.5%
1971	188,805	+45.2%
1981	267,749	+41.8%
1991	324,881	+21.3%
2001	315,251	−3.0%
2011	341,831	+8.4%

Note: The population figures are based on the 2011 Census of India, as the results of the subsequent national census have not yet been released.

Note: Historical population figures are based on the municipal boundaries in effect at the time of each respective census, prior to the subsequent municipal expansion.

As of 2011 Census of India, the city had a population of 341,831. A total of 29,883 children are in the age group of 0–6 years, of which 15,152 are boys and 14,731 are girls—a sex ratio of 972 per 1000. The average literacy rate stands at 84.28% (male 88.14%; female 80.54%) with 264,653 literates, significantly higher than the national average of 73.00%.

Religions in Rajahmundry (2011)
Religion	Percent
Hindus	92.21%
Muslims	4.21%
Christians	2.65%
Jains	0.53%
Other or not stated	0.40%
Distribution of religions

In terms of language, 94.12% of the population spoke Telugu and 3.49% Urdu as their first language.. The city features a high literacy rate of over 84.12%.

== Governance ==
The Andhra Pradesh government has approved a comprehensive Master Plan on 21 February 2026 for the expansion of municipalities under the Rajamahendravaram Urban Development Authority (RUDA). This includes Konthamuru, Kolamuru, Gadala, Palacherla, Lalacheruvu, Diwancheruuvu, Pidimgoyyi, Hukumpeta, Satellite city, Bommuru, Katheru, and Dowleswaram. With this, a Greater Rajamahendravaram region will come into existence.

The city is currently classified under the Z category for House Rent Allowance (HRA) and other central government allowances. In October 2024, reports indicated that a proposal was under consideration to upgrade Rajamahendravaram to the Y category.

=== Municipal expansion ===
In January 2020, the Government of Andhra Pradesh issued G.O. No. 85, proposing the merger of 23 surrounding villages from Korukonda, Rajanagaram, Rajahmundry Rural and Kadiam mandals into the Rajamahendravaram Municipal Corporation. The proposal envisaged expanding the corporation's jurisdiction and upgrading it to Greater Rajamahendravaram Municipal Corporation (GRMC). The order was published in the state gazette on 31 January 2020; however, the proposed reorganisation was not subsequently implemented, and the GRMC was not formally constituted.

On October 16 2026, The Government of Andhra Pradesh expanded the Rajamahendravaram Municipal Corporation (RMC) through the merger of 11 surrounding villages. Following the delimitation process, the number of municipal wards was increased to 72, accompanied by a reorganisation of ward boundaries.The merged localities included Hukumpeta, Katheru, Satellite City, Bommuru, Dowleswaram, Pidimgoyyi, Rajavolu, Thorredu, Venkatanagaram, Vemagiri and Lalacheruvu. Following the expansion, the corporation's population was estimated to have increased to approximately 514,000(2011), including around 200,000 residents from the newly incorporated areas.Other nearby villages, including Diwancheruvu, Srirampuram, Palacherla, Punyakshetram and Chakradwarabandam, were considered in earlier expansion proposals but were not included. Konthamuru and Kolamuru were also excluded owing to reported legal issues.

Police administration

The Andhra Pradesh government approved the establishment of the Rajamahendravaram Police Commissionerate on 06 October 2026 through G.O. Ms. No. 198. Headquartered in Rajamahendravaram, the commissionerate is designed to comprise three territorial zones, with jurisdiction corresponding to the East Godavari revenue district and the East Godavari Police District. It is to be headed by a Commissioner of Police of Inspector General or Deputy Inspector General rank, with executive magistrate powers.

Present representatives of City:

- Daggubati Purandeswari (Rajahmundry Lok Sabha).
- Adireddy Srinivas (Rajahmundry Urban).
- Gorantla Butchaih Chowdary (Rajahmundry Rural).
- Bathula Balaramakrishna (Rajanagaram Assembly Constituency

Totally: 3 MLAs representing Rajahmundry City limits

Mandals in city:

- Rajahmundry Urban mandal Completely in Rajahmundry city
- Rajahmundry Rural mandal
- Kadiam mandal (Only Vemagiri of Kadiam mandal is part of Rajahmundry city)
- Rajanagaram Mandal (Only Lalacheruvu of Rajanagaram mandal is part of Rajahmundry city

== Floriculture ==
Rajahmundry is also famous for flowers, as various varieties are cultivated here. Nurseries are spread over more than 3,500 acres in the Kadiam, Rajahmundry Rural mandals of the city. The Central Floriculture Institute and Research Centre is under construction at Vemagiri in the city. The government exports these flowers from Rajahmundry Airport through cargo planes.

== Economy ==
Rajahmundry is a commercial hub for East Godavari and West Godavari Districts. Nurseries in Kadiam mandal generate huge revenue to Rajahmundry revenue division. A floriculture research centre is under construction at Vemagiri to give a major boost to the nurseries in Godavari districts. Floriculture is expanding to Mandapeta, Alamuru and Atreyapuram mandals. Main Road and Tadithota are the main commercial areas in the city. Many shopping complexes, multiplexes, hotels and convention halls are under construction near NH 216A (old NH 16) and it is becoming another shopping centre. Tourism also generates revenue for this region. It is one of the largest bullion markets in India, with hundreds of gold, silver and platinum shops throughout the city.

== Industries and employment ==
Rajahmundry is an industrial hub with huge industries generating employment. The city is the headquarters for ONGC, GAIL in K.G. Basin. The Godavari districts form one of the largest petrochemical hubs in India. There are two huge paper mills in the city located at Luthergiri and Kadiam. There are two power plants in city i.e., GMR Power Plant and Vijjeswaram Power Plant (which runs on Natural gas and Naptha as primary and secondary fuels). The Government has set up industrial parks and industrial clusters at Nidigatla, Pallakadiam, Rajanagaram, Kadiyam, Jegurapadu areas in the city. The present district five-year plan, includes making the city an IT hub.

== Culture ==
=== Art and crafts ===
Damerla Rama Rao Art Gallery is dedicated to the works of the artist Damerla Rama Rao of the city and showcases various paintings by him such as Krishna Leela, Godavari of Eastern Ghats and Milkmaids of Kathiawar.

Ratnam pens are India's first handcrafted pens, made since 1932. The pens are made from ebonite with gold- or silver-plated nibs. Ratnamson is the brand name of K. V. Ratnam and Sons; Ratnam Ball Pen Works is located at Fort Gate, Rajahmundry.

=== Literature ===
Nannayya is the earliest known Telugu poet, and the author of the first third of the Andhra Mahabharatam, a Telugu retelling of the Mahabharata. Sri Kandukuri Veeresalingam (1848–1919), a renowned social reformer, is widely considered the person who first brought about a renaissance in Telugu literature and among Telugu people; he is also known to have fought for women's issues. General Sir Arthur Thomas Cotton, (15 May 1803 – 24 July 1899) was a British General and an irrigation engineer. Adurthi Subba Rao, prominent old-time Director and Producer of Telugu Films. Julia Maitland, a campaigner for "native" education, founded a multilingual school and reading room in the town in 1837. Nalam Krishna Rao, a writer and social activist from Godavari, set up the Gowthami Grandhalayam in Rajahmundry in 1898.

=== Music and films ===
Durga Cinetone was the first South Indian film studio, to be built in Rajahmundry in the year 1936 by Nidamarthi Surayya. Many other films have been shot in the city.

The city has produced many well-known artists in the Telugu film industry such as Adurthi Subba Rao, S. V. Ranga Rao, Ali, Raja Babu, Jaya Prada, Sameera Reddy, Bhanupriya, Sriman, Meghna Reddy, Thotakura Venkata Raju, Uma Pemmaraju, Ramesh, Sira Sri, Bhaskarabhatla Ravi Kumar, Ali, M Murali Mohan and J. D. Chakravarthy.

== Tourism ==
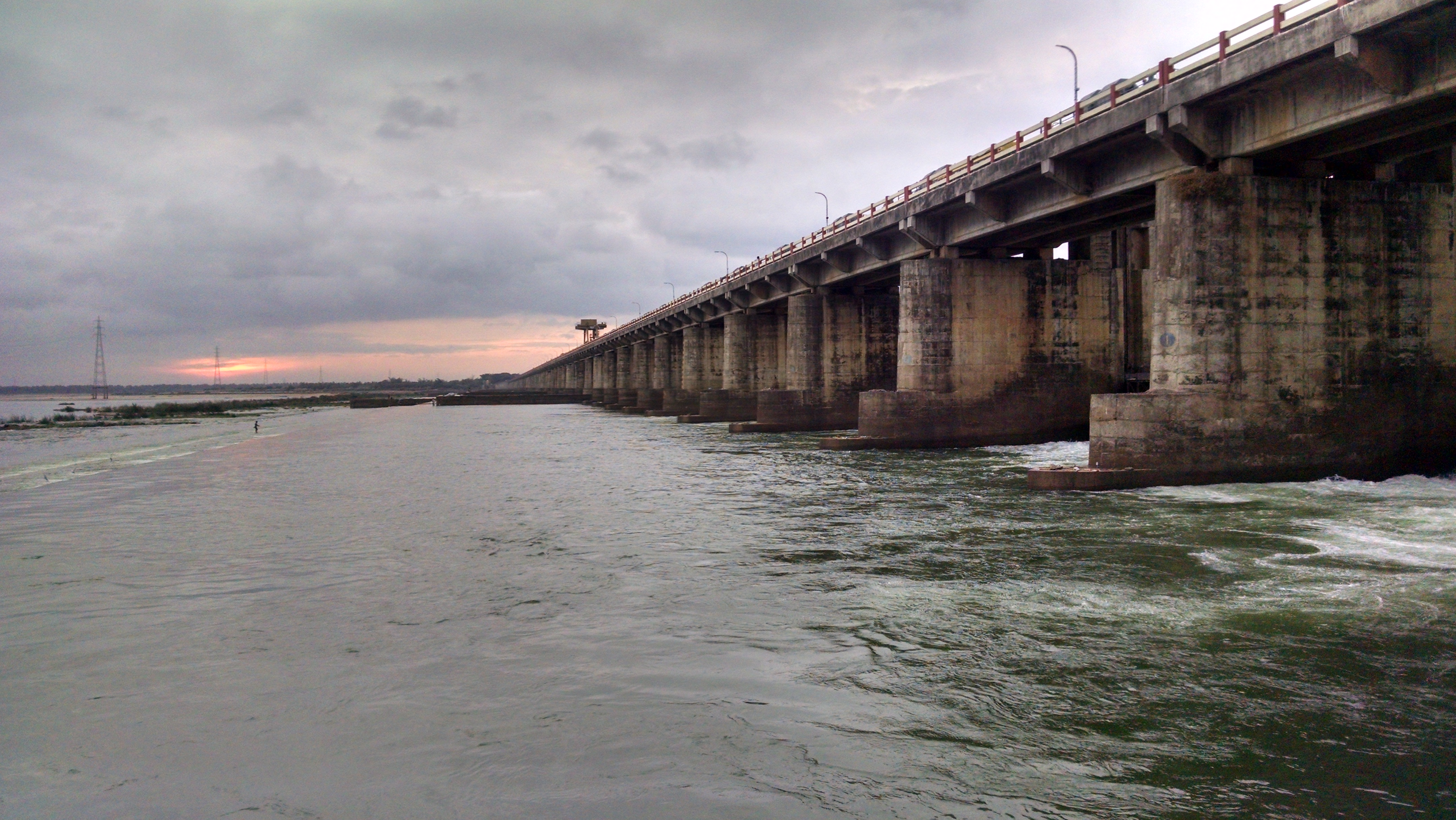
Sir Arthur Cotton Barrage in Rajahmundry on River Godavari

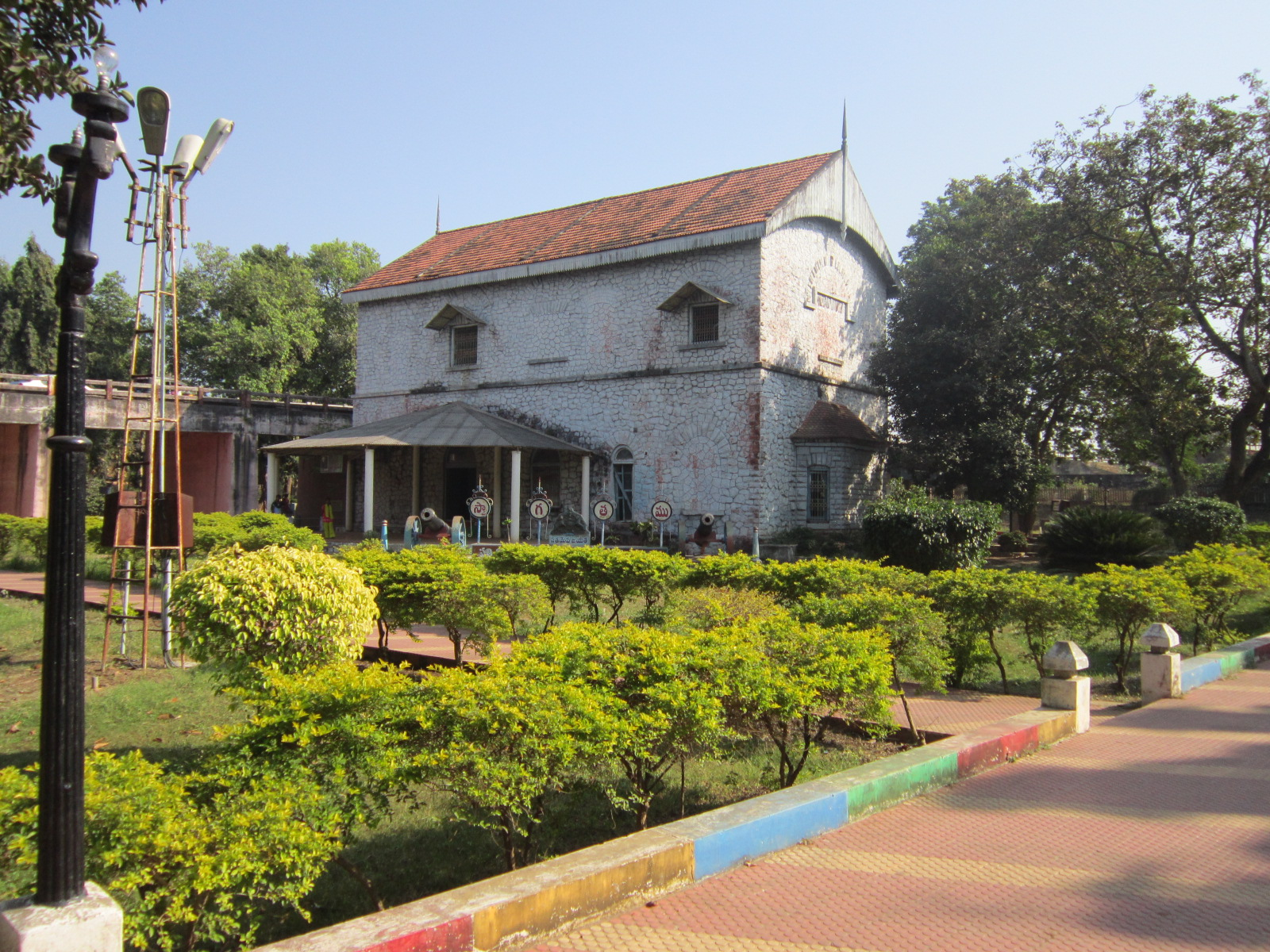
Cotton museum

The river Godavari and its bridges and the Sir Arthur Cotton Museum are some of the attractions in the city. Rajahmundry is a tourist destination in the state. Daily tourist boats operate from Pushkar Ghat to Papikondalu and Bhadrachalam. Nurseries in Kadiam mandal are another tourist destination.

Government of Andhra Pradesh is rehabilitating the old Godavari bridge (Havelock Bridge) and constructing resorts, convention centers, film studios, hotels, recreational places at Pichukalanka and other islands on River Godavari and eco-tourism centre at Kadiyapulanka, Zoological Park. The government of Andhra Pradesh is also constructing Rajahmundry International Cricket Stadium on PPP mode to host international matches. Greater Rajamahendravaram Municipal Corporation (GRMC), Godavari Urban Development Authority (GUDA) and Andhra Pradesh Tourism Development Corporation (APTDC) are planning riverfront development on 22 km (14 mi) stretch of river Godavari from Venkatanagaram to Vemagiri. The Government is signing MoUs with private agencies for Malls, Multiplexes, Hotels, Convention Centers and Recreational places on PPP mode as a part of tourism development. Rajahmundry Airport is being developed as an international airport to provide a major boost to tourism in Godavari districts. Polavaram Project, which is 25 km (16 mi) away from city, will become another major tourist site near the city.

== Transport ==
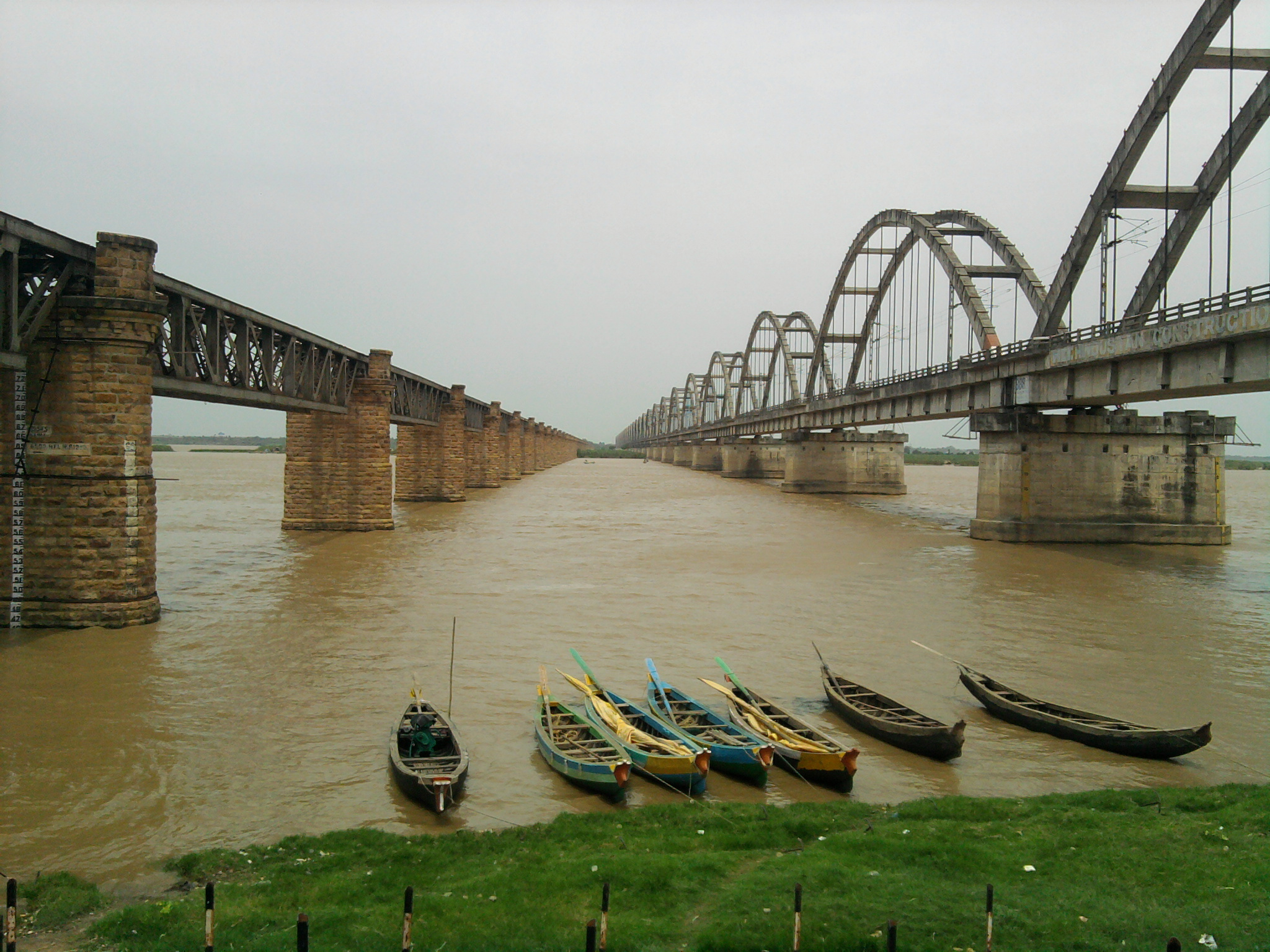
Godavari Rail Bridges view from PushkharGhat

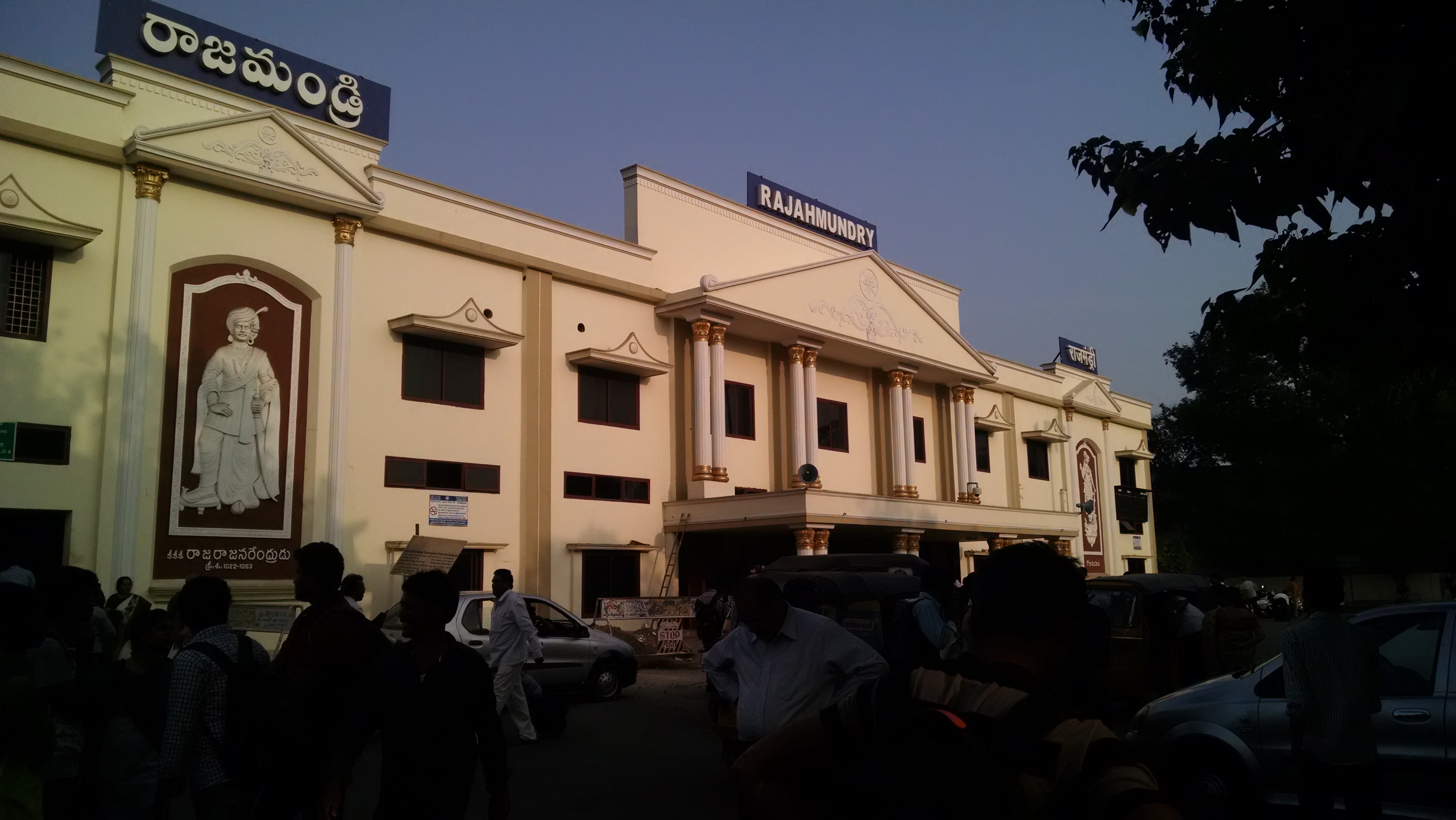
Rajahmundry Railway station Entrance

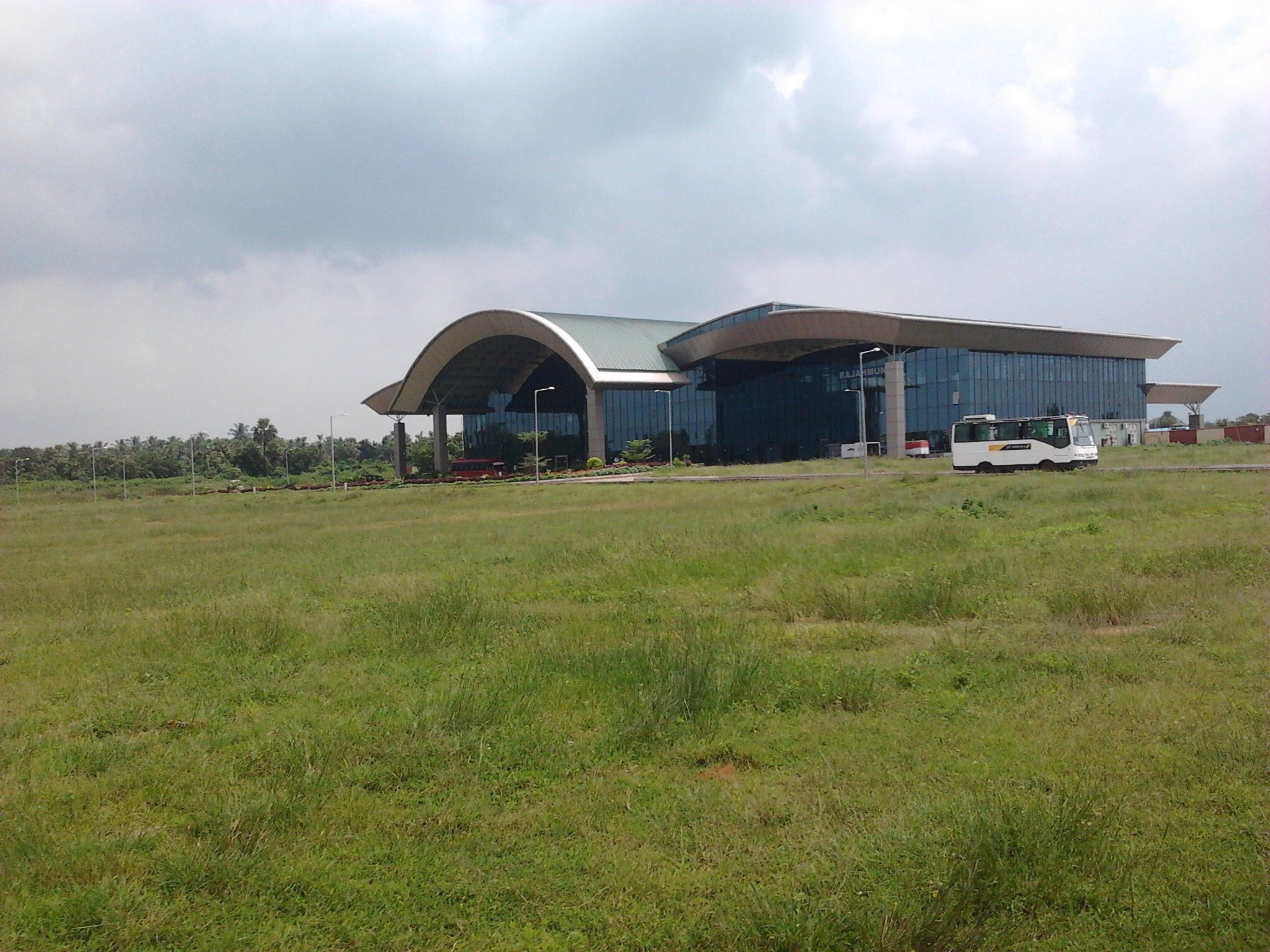
Rajahmundry Airport

The bridges across Godavari river are an important transport infrastructure for connectivity such as, the Godavari Bridge, which is the third longest railroad bridge in India; and the Godavari Arch Bridge, commissioned on 14 March 1997 for Howrah–Chennai main line. While, the Old Godavari Bridge (The Havelock Bridge) was the earliest of all, built in 1897 and was decommissioned in 1997. The city also has Dowleswaram Cotton Barrage bridge and fourth bridge on either side of the main city that connects the highways of East Godavari and West Godavari districts.

=== Roads ===
Rajahmundry is very well connected to the state and the rest of India with a network of state and national highways. NH 16 passes through the city. NH 365BB and NH 516D connect the city with Khammam, Suryapet and Hyderabad. NH 216A, which is a spur road to NH-16, connects the city with Ravulapalem, Tanuku, Tadepalligudem and Eluru. NH 516E connects the city with Vizianagaram via Rampachodavaram, Narsipatnam and Araku.

ADB Road and SH 40 (Canal Road) connects the city with Kakinada and SH 41 is connected with Odisha, Chhattisgarh, Telangana borders with Andhra Pradesh and Bhadrachalam. SH 104 connects the city with Amalapuram. SH 172 is connected to Purushottampatnam and Polavaram Project. SH 72 connects the city to Nidadavolu, Palakollu and Narasapuram, Bhimavaram.

NHAI is constructing flyovers on NH 16 and NH 216A at Diwancheruvu, Lalacheruvu, Morampudi, Vemagiri and Kadiyapulanka junctions in the city to ease traffic. Trumpet Bridge is being constructed at ADB road on NH 16 in Rajanagaram. An ROB was proposed from Morampudi to Kotipalli Bus stand. Godavari Urban Development Authority (GUDA), Greater Rajamahendravaram Municipal Corporation (GRMC) are constructing an outer ring road (ORR) for the city to ease traffic in the city.

=== Railways ===
There are two railway stations in Rajahmahendravaram: Rajahmundry railway station and Godavari railway station. Rajahmundry railway station is classified as an A category station. It is located on the Howrah-Chennai main line of South Central Railway zone. The new platforms 4 and 5 were operational from 2023. A second railway line is proposed on the Godavari Arch Bridge. A new railway line to Raipur from the city connecting Rampachodavaram and other East agency areas is in the proposal. The frequency of trains will be increased after the completion of Kovvur-Bhadrachalam railway line and the distance to Secunderabad will be decreased.

=== Waterways ===
National Waterway 4 was declared on 24 November 2008, which connects the Indian states of Andhra Pradesh, Tamil Nadu, and the union territory of Puducherry. It passes through Kakinada, Rajahmundry, Tadepalligudem, Eluru, Commanur, Buckingham Canal and also part of Krishna and Godavari rivers. Kakinada Port is the nearest port to the city. A new commercial port is under construction at Kakinada City by GMR on PPP mode. Narasapuram Port is proposed according to AP State Reorganisation Act. It is being developed by Inland Waterways Authority of India.Inland water port is proposed at Bobbillanka. APTDC and other private agencies' boats and launches are available daily from Pushakar Ghat to Papikondalu and Bhadrachalam.

=== Airways ===
Rajahmundry Airport is situated at Madhurapudi in the north of Rajamahendravaram. The airport serves the people of godavari districts in Andhra Pradesh. Indigo airline has been operating non-stop flights to and from the cities of Bengaluru, Chennai, Pondicherry, Delhi, Hyderabad, and Mumbai. The airport's runway was expanded from 1,749 m (5,738 ft) to 3,165 m (10,384 ft) and it is the second longest runway in the state of Andhra Pradesh. A new integrated domestic terminal will come up at Rajahmundry airport as part of its expansion and upgradation plans. The new terminal building, to be built at a cost of Rs 135 crore, will feature all modern facilities, including aero bridges, and will be capable of handling 1,400 passengers (700 arrivals and 700 departures) simultaneously. The airport has also obtained a DGCA license for handling wide-bodied aircraft such as Airbus A321 and Boeing 737. The airport has a dedicated cargo terminal. The government of AP is keen on exporting flowers through this airport from the nurseries in Kadiyam mandal of East Godavari district.

== Education ==
The primary and secondary school education is imparted by government, aided and private schools, under the School Education Department of the state. As per the school information report for the academic year 2016–17, the city has 55,501 students enrolled in 244 schools. The medium of instruction followed by schools is Telugu and English. The Railway High School in the city has a history of more than hundred years, established in the year 1909.

The city has one of the thirteen regional offices of the Board of Intermediate Education, which administers Intermediate education (10+2) education. The Government Junior College is the only government run junior college, established in 1974 and there are four private-aided, twenty private-unaided colleges in the city.

The Government Arts College was founded more than 150 years ago by the reformer, Kandukuri Veeresalingam Panthulu. The BEd Training Institute is one of the oldest in India. Adikavi Nannaya University was established in March 2006, named after an 11th-century poet, Nannayya. Other major universities in the city include Potti Sreeramulu Telugu University, Acharya N. G. Ranga Agricultural University, Dr. B.R. Ambedkar Open University Study Center. Andhra Pradesh State Forest Academy is located in the city for Forest skills training.

National Institute of Technology, Andhra Pradesh, Tadepalligudem is located 34 km (21 mi) from the city.

Central Government Institutions in the city are as follows:

- "Central Tobacco Research Institute (CTRI)".
- "National Centre for Disease Control (NCDC)".
- "National Academy of Constructions (NAC)".

"Central Floriculture Institute and Research Centre" is in construction at Vemagiri. "Science City" is in construction at Bommuru.

After the Reorganization of Andhra Pradesh State the following institutes are sanctioned for the city:

- "Indian Institute of Petroleum and Energy (IIPE)".
- "National Civil Aviation Academy".
- "National Institute of Drama (NID)".
- "AP State Forest Academy".

== See also ==
- Aryapuram
- List of cities in Andhra Pradesh
- List of municipal corporations in India
- Rajamundry Sarkar
