= Transport in Rajamahendravaram =

There are various modes of transportation available in Rajamahendravaram and its region in India. Although Auto rickshaws, bicycles are mostly used, mass transit systems – such as buses and trains. It is home for a domestic airport located in Madhurapudi, Rajahmahendravaram and is named as Rajahmundry Airport.

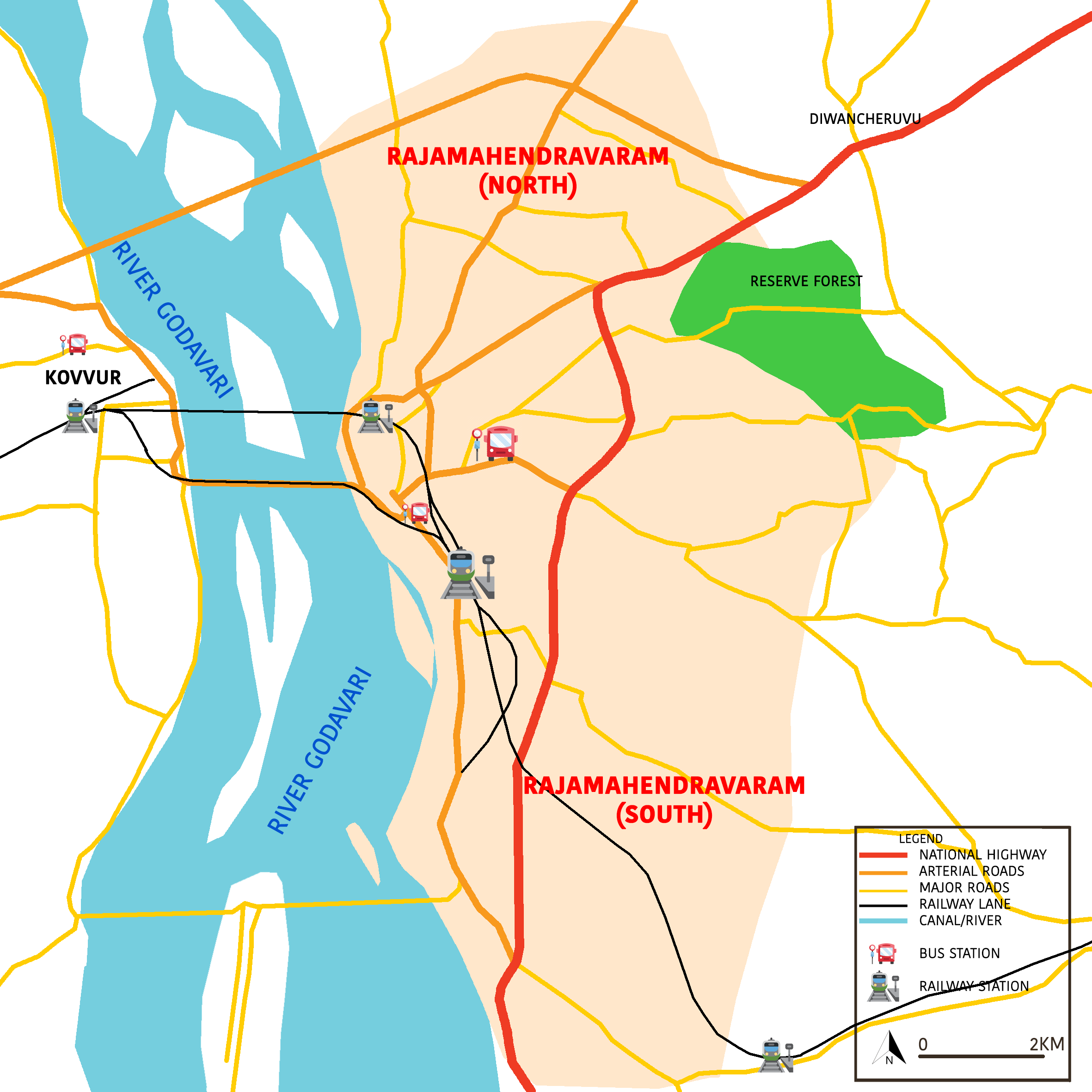
Rajahmundry city map

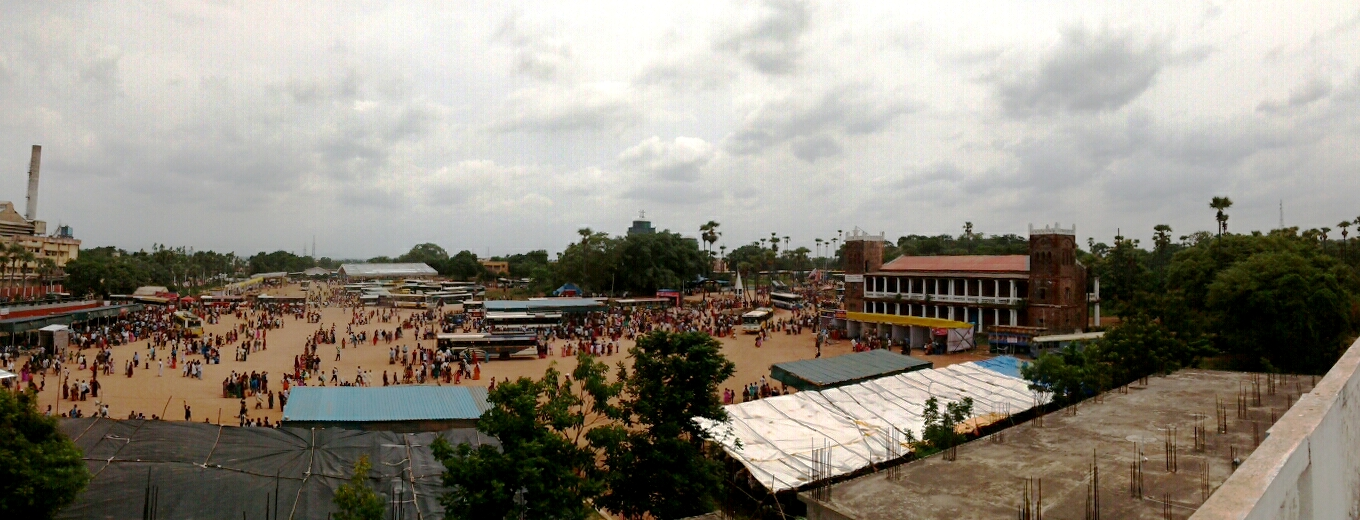
Temporary bus station during Godavari Pushkaralu

== Roadways ==
The city has a total road length of 472.28 km (293.46 mi), covering 454 km (282 mi) of municipal roads, 13.78 km (8.56 mi) of Roads & Buildings department roads and 4.5 km (2.8 mi) of National highways. Main Road, Stadium Road and Katheru Road are the main arterial roads of the city. Tadithota, Nandmam Ganiraju Junction, Devi Chowk and Morampudi Junction are major junctions in the city. Godavari Bridge is the fourth longest rail-cum-road bridge in Asia. Godavari Fourth Bridge was later constructed to ease the traffic on Godavari Bridge.

== Public transport ==
There are two railway stations in Rajahmundry

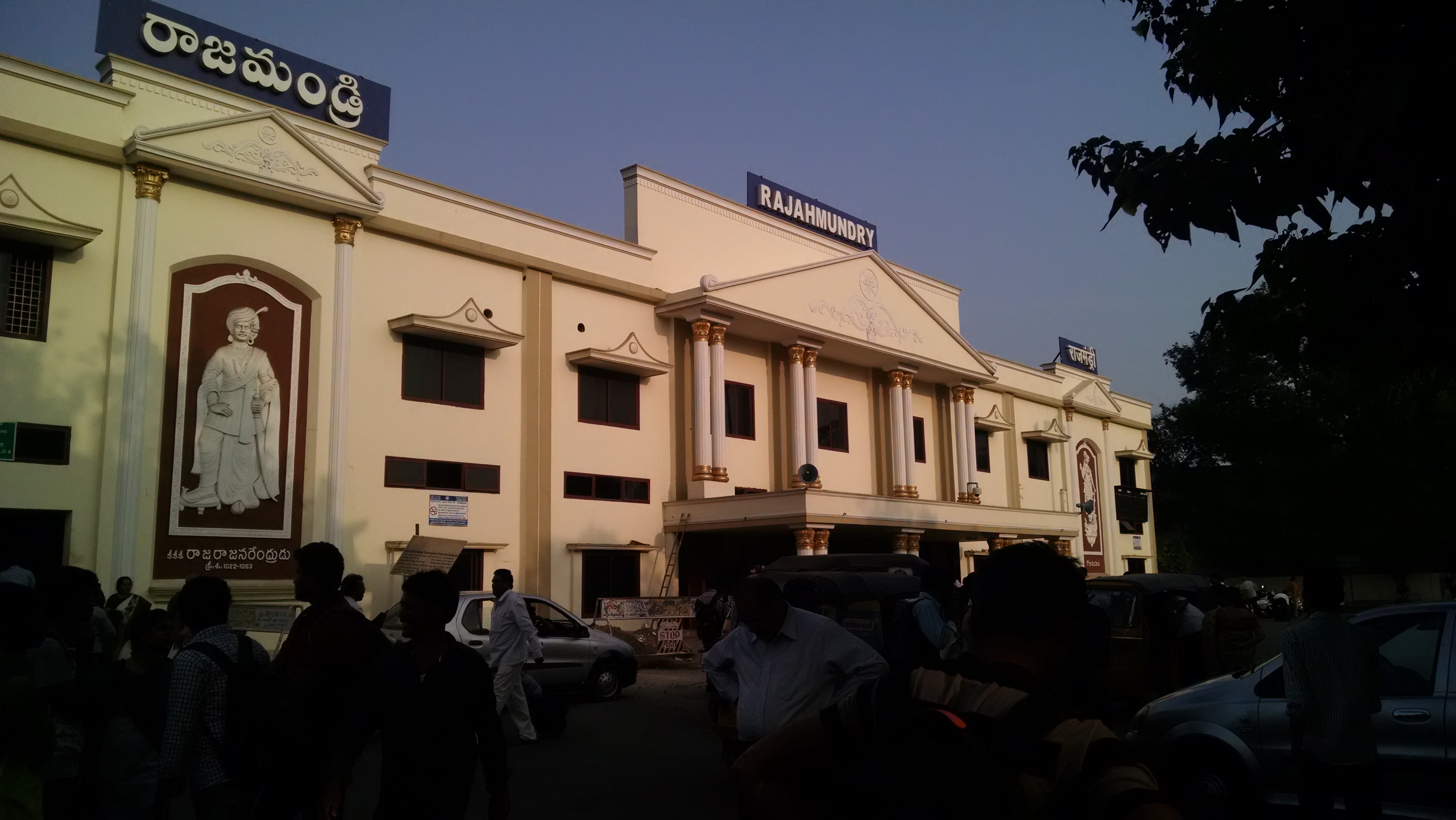
Rajamundry railway station

Bus Transit is the major mode of passenger transport in the city. APS RTC Bus Complex is the major bus station in the city, alongside Kotipalli and Gokavaram bus stands. City bus services fleet run across three of the busiest routes in the city.

Train Transit is the major mode of transportation in the city, Rajahmundry is an ‘A’–category station in Vijayawada division and one of the top 100 booking stations in India. Godavari station is a satellite station with category–‘D’ located adjacent to River Godavari to ease travel for tourists visiting the city.

== Airways ==
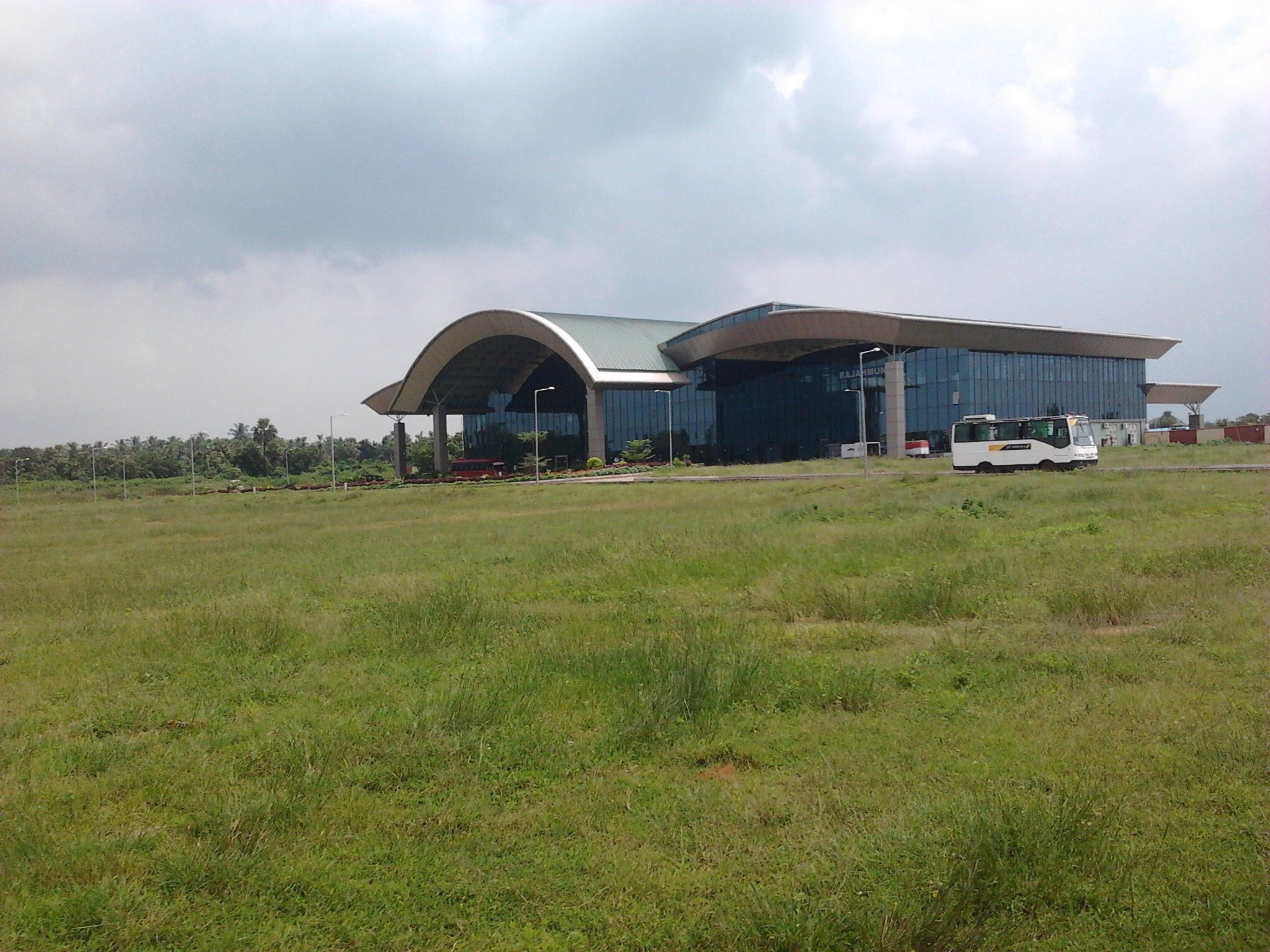
Madhurapudi airport

Airplanes are often used by passengers as they connect Rajahmundry to major cities and other tourist destinations. Rajahmundry Airport serves the city and is located at Madhurapudi, 18 kilometres north of the city. It is a domestic airport with direct flight connectivity to Hyderabad, Bengaluru, Chennai. A new runway is set to complete within a few months, which makes it the holder of longest runway in Andhra Pradesh.
