= Kadiam mandal =

Kadiam Mandal
- Mandal
- Interactive map of Kadiam Mandal
- Country: India
- State: Andhra Pradesh
- District: East Godavari
- Time zone: UTC+5:30 (IST)

Kadiam Mandal is one of the 19 mandals in East Godavari District of Andhra Pradesh. As per census 2011, there are 7 villages.

== Demographics ==
Kadiam Mandal has total population of 90,499 as per the Census 2011 out of which 45,066 are males while 45,433 are females and the Average Sex Ratio of Kadiam Mandal is 1,008. The total literacy rate of Kadiam Mandal is 68.58%. The male literacy rate is 63.77% and the female literacy rate is 59.21%.

== Villages ==
1. Damireddipalle
2. Dulla
3. Jegurupadu
4. Kadiam
5. Muramanda
6. Veeravaram
7. Vemagiri (an area in Rajahmundry)
8. Kadiapulanka
9. Pottilanka
10. Kadiyapusavaram

== See also ==
- List of mandals in Andhra Pradesh
