= Kondagunturu =

- Village
- Interactive map of Kondagunturu
- Location in Andhra Pradesh, India
- Coordinates: 16.942447°N 81.852515°E
- Country: India
- State: Andhra Pradesh
- Region: Rajanagaram
- District: East Godavari district

Population
  - Total: 3,500 approximately

Languages telugu
  - Official: Telugu
- Time zone: UTC+5:30 (IST)
- PIN: 533124
- 200 years old sivalayam constructed by cholas.

Kondagunturu is situated in East Godavari district in Rajanagaram, in Andhra Pradesh State. The village also forms a part of Godavari Urban Development Authority.
