= Jegurupadu =

- village
- Interactive map of Jegurupadu
- Location in Andhra Pradesh, India Jegurupadu (India)
- Coordinates: 16.909848°N 81.8553°E
- Country: India
- State: Andhra Pradesh
- District: East Godavari
- Talukas: Kadiam
- Elevation: 8 m (26 ft)

Languages
  - Official: Telugu
- Time zone: UTC+5:30 (IST)
- PIN: 533126
- Telephone code: 0883
- Vehicle registration: AP05
- Distance from Rajahmundry: 15 kilometres (9.3 mi)
- Distance from Hyderabad: 433 kilometres (269 mi)

Jegurupadu is a village near mandal headquarters Kadiam, Kadiam mandal, Rajahmundry in East Godavari district of Andhra Pradesh, India.

== Geography ==
Jegurupadu is located at 16.9098°N 81.8553°E.
