= Rajamahendravaram Urban Development Authority =

Urban planning agency in Rajamahendravaram, Andhra Pradesh, India

Rajamahendravaram Urban Development Authority (RUDA)
Agency overview
- Formed: 25 July 2022
- Type: Urban Planning Agency
- Jurisdiction: Government of Andhra Pradesh
- Headquarters: Rajamahendravaram, Andhra Pradesh

The Rajamahendravaram Urban Development Authority (abbreviated: RUDA) is an urban planning agency in East Godavari district and Konaseema districts of the Indian state of Andhra Pradesh. It was constituted on 25 July 2022, splitting the earlier Godavari Urban Development Authority under Andhra Pradesh Metropolitan Region and Urban Development Authorities Act, 2016 with the headquarters located at Rajamahendravaram.

== Jurisdiction ==
The Rajamahendravaram Urban Development Authority (RUDA) governs an expanded area of 3,142.022 km^{2}. It includes the Rajamahendravaram Municipal Corporation, along with over 200 villages across 17 mandals, including 65 villages in the Konaseema district. RUDA focuses on smart city solutions and infrastructure development in this region. Key details regarding RUDA jurisdiction:

- Total Area: ~3,142 km^{2}, resulting from expansion in 2023.
- Components: 3 Urban Local Bodies (ULBs) and 207 villages across 17 mandals, primarily in East Godavari district.
- Expansion: Includes 65 villages covering 338 km^{2} in the Dr. B.R. Ambedkar Konaseema district (Ramachandrapuram Rural, K. Gangavaram, Rayavaram, and Kapileswarapuram mandals).
- Function: Responsible for urban planning, infrastructure, and development initiatives around Rajamahendravaram (formerly Rajahmundry).

The jurisdictional area of RUDA is spread over an area of The below table lists the urban areas of RUDA.

Jurisdiction
Settlement Type	Name	Total
Municipal Corporations	Rajamahendravaram	1
