= Godavari Fourth Bridge =

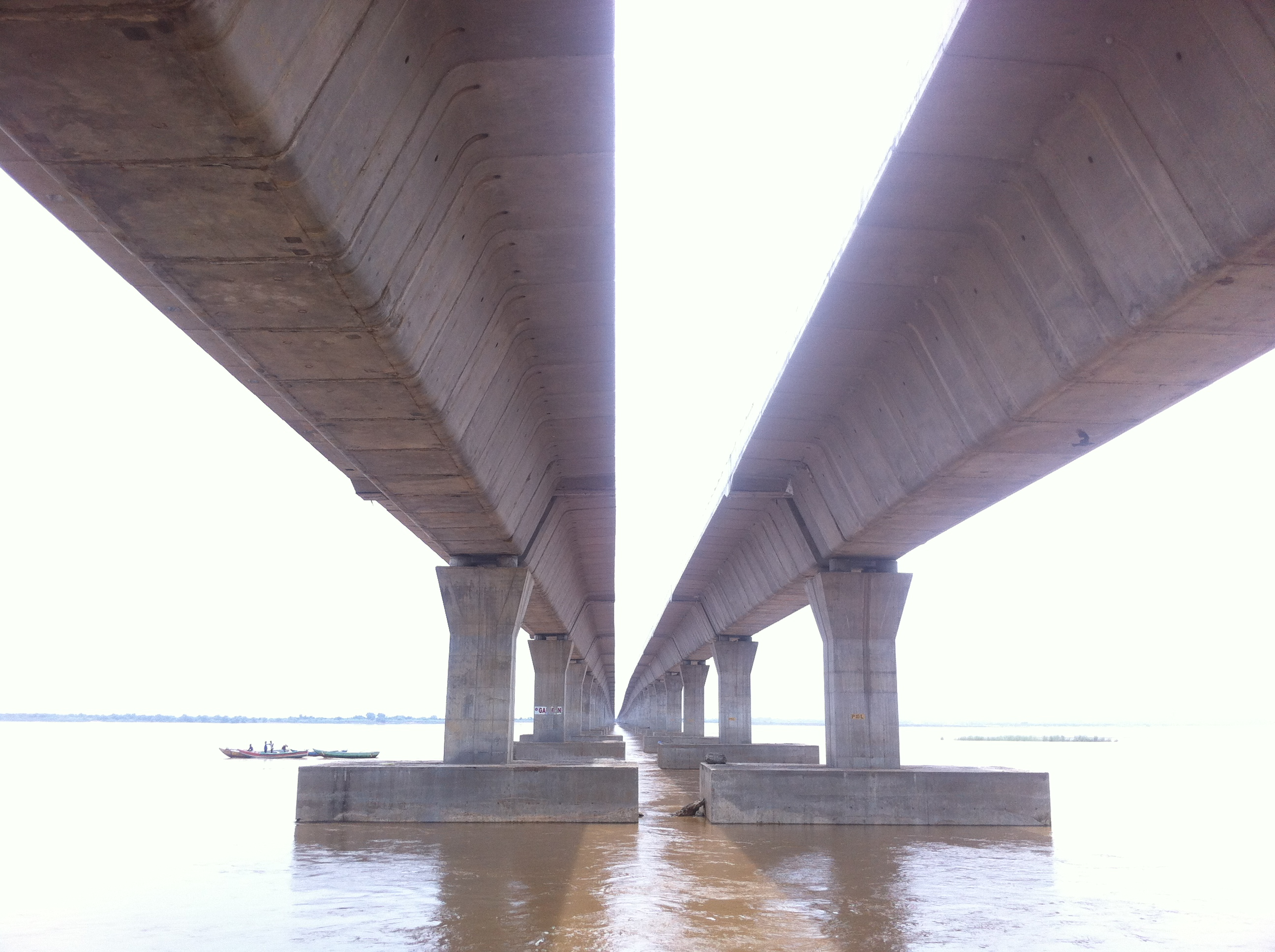
- 4th Godavari Bridge at Kovuur
- Coordinates: 17°02′17″N 81°44′47″E
- Carries: Four lanes of Road
- Crosses: Godavari River
- Locale: Rajamahendravaram
- Official name: Rajamahendravaram–Kovvur 4th Bridge
- Maintained by: Gammon India Ltd.

Characteristics
- Total length: 4.135 kilometres (2.569 mi)
- Piers in water: 81

History
- Engineering design by: Gammon India
- Opened: 2015

Location
- Interactive map of Godavari Fourth Bridge

The Godavari Fourth Bridge or Kovvur–Rajamahendravaram 4th Bridge is built across Godavari River in Rajamahendravaram, India. This dual bridge connects Kovvur to Diwancheruvu Junction in Rajamahendravaram in via Katheru, Konthamuru, Palacherla areas in Rajamahendravaram City. This bridge was constructed, aimed to reduce road distance between Kolkata and Chennai by at least 150 kilometres (93 mi).

== History ==
The foundation stone for the bridge was laid in 2009 by then Chief Minister Y.S. Rajasekhara Reddy. 4th bridge was targeted for completed in 2012, but due to multiple delays it was opened to traffic in 2015. Due to delays the cost of bridge went up to Rs. 800 crore from the estimated Rs. 512 crore. This bridge was expected to ease traffic through Rajahmundry city but some multi-axle trucks are using the old route due to the narrow road connecting the bridge from Gundugolanu to Kovvur.

== See also ==
- Godavari Bridge
- Old Godavari Bridge
- Godavari Arch Bridge
