= Kolamuru =

- Neighbourhood
- Interactive map of Kolamuru
- Location in Andhra Pradesh, India Kolamuru (India)
- Coordinates: 17.065769°N 81.808312°E
- Country: India
- State: Andhra Pradesh
- Region: Rajahmundry Rural
- District: East Godavari district

Languages
  - Official: Telugu
- Time zone: UTC+5:30 (IST)

Kolamuru is a locality in Rajamahendravaram City. It is a part of "Greater Rajamahendravaram Municipal Corporation (GRMC)". It also forms a part of Godavari Urban Development Authority.
