= P. R. Government College =

College in Kakinada, Andhra Pradesh, India

Pithapur Rajah's Government College
- Motto: Enter, Endeavour, Excel
- Type: Public
- Established: 1884
- Affiliations: Adikavi Nannaya University
- Principal: Dr. K.Anjaneyulu
- Location: Kakinada, Andhra Pradesh, India
- Campus: Urban
- Website: www.prgc.edu.in

The Pithapur Rajah's Government College, commonly known as P. R. Government College, is an Indian autonomous educational institution located in Kakinada, Andhra Pradesh. Established in 1884, it is one of the oldest higher educational institutions in Andhra. It has been recognized as a 'College with Potential for Excellence' by the University Grants Commission in 2010. It is affiliated to the Adikavi Nannaya University.

== History ==
Pithapur Rajah's College (P. R. College) is one of the oldest educational institutions in Andhra. Initially established as a middle school in 1852, it was early on funded through private subscriptions. Financial difficulties led to its temporary closure in 1862, but it was revived in 1863 under the efforts of Collector Mr. Purvis, who secured government funding and contributions from the Pithapuram zamindar, an alumnus of the institution. In 1865, the school received an endowment of ₹28,000 and land donations from the Pithapuram zamindar, which facilitated the construction of new buildings and its expansion.

In August 1884, the school was elevated to a second-grade college under the patronage of Sri Rajah Rao Venkata Mahipathi Gangadhara Rama Rao Bahadur, the then zamindar of Pithapuram. It introduced an F. A. class and became affiliated with the University of Madras, earning the name Pithapur Rajah’s College. To ensure financial stability, the institution was incorporated under the Indian Companies Act in 1892. Managed by a council comprising local officials, the college expanded its infrastructure and academic offerings over time. By 1903-04, it was largely self-sustaining, providing scholarships to underprivileged students and educating nearly 500 students from surrounding regions.

The college played a pioneering role in promoting women's education, offering full fee exemptions and various incentives for female students. In 1952, the college was taken over by the government, becoming P. R. Government College. It celebrated its centenary in March 1984.

P. R. College has two campuses: the Science College campus, located near the Main Road, and the Arts College campus, which spans approximately 28 acres near the Government General Hospital. The college's surroundings include McLaren High School, the District Collector's Office, and the Zilla Parishad Office.

In 2000, P. R. Government College was granted autonomous status by the University Grants Commission (UGC), with the approval of Andhra University and the Government of Andhra Pradesh. In October 2010, the UGC recognized the college as a College with Potential for Excellence (CPE), providing financial support for its development.

== Academic programmes ==
Undergraduate and postgraduate programmes in arts and science, affiliated to the Adikavi Nannaya University, are offered at the college, which has been accredited by NAAC with an A grade (CGPA 3.17).
