= Kadiyapusavaram =

Kadiyapusavaram is a village situated in Kadiam mandal, East Godavari District, Andhra Pradesh, India.
