= Durga Cinetone =

Former Indian film studio

- Company type: Private
- Industry: Entertainment
- Founded: 1936
- Founder: Nidamarthi Surayya
- Defunct: 1939
- Headquarters: Rajahmundry, India
- Products: Films
- Services: Film production

Durga Cinetone was an Indian film studio established in 1936 in Rajahmundry, Andhra Pradesh, India by Nidamarthi Surayya. It was the first South Indian film studio. Due to financial crisis, the studio was later shut down.

== Films produced ==
Year	Film	Director	Cast
1936	Sampoorna Ramayanam	S.B. Narayana	B. Narayana Murthy; Rama Nagabhushanam; Pushpavalli
1938	Mohini Bhasmasura	Chittajalu Pullayya	Dasari Kotiratnam; Pushpavalli; Subba Rao A.V.
1938	Bhakta Jayadeva	Hiren Bose	Surabhi Kamalabai; Shanta Kumari; Rentachintala Satyanarayana
