= Rajamahendravaram bus station =

Bus station in Rajahmundry, Andhra Pradesh, India

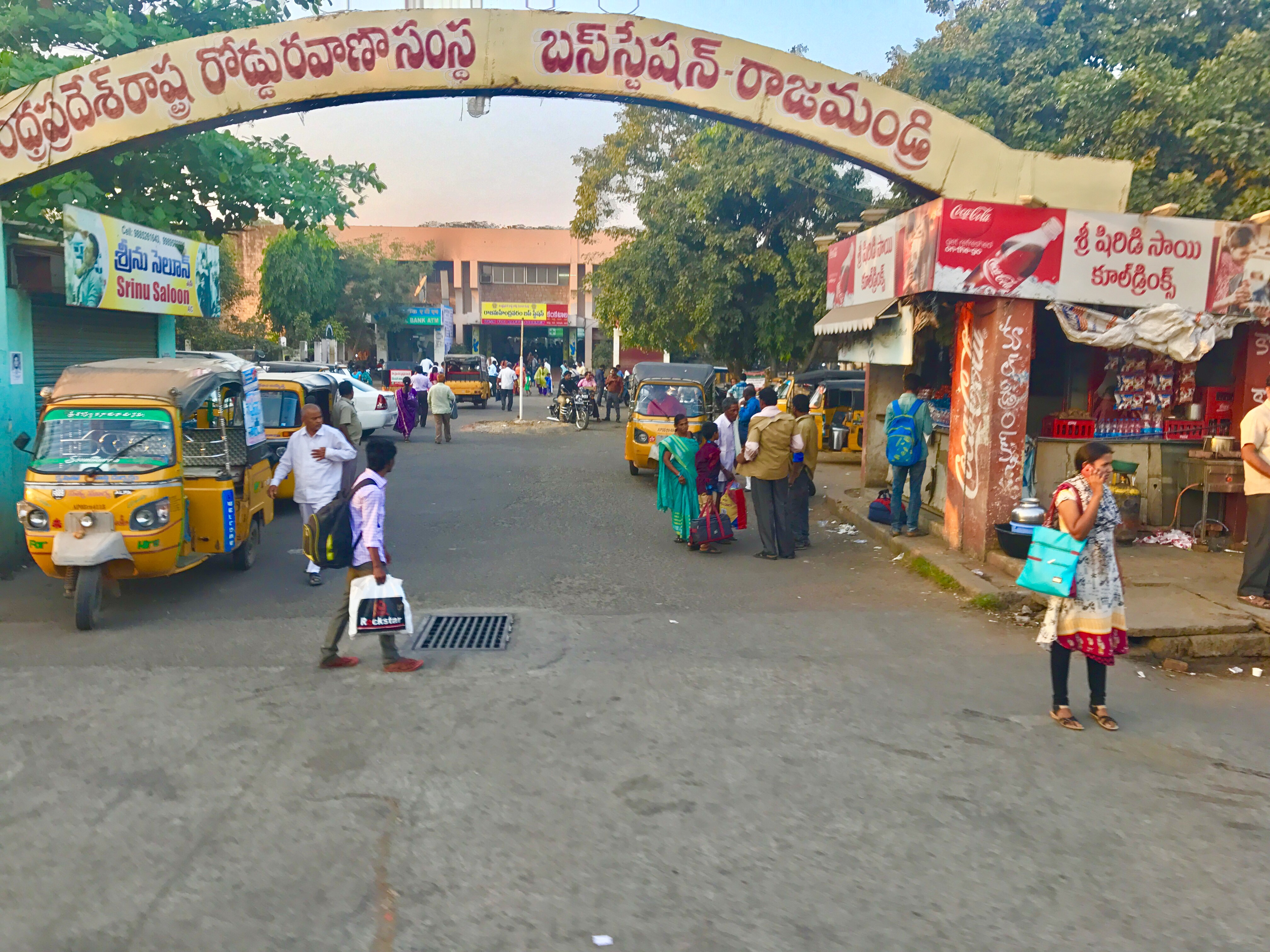
- Rajamahendravaram Bus Station entrance

General information
- Location: Rajamahendravaram, Andhra Pradesh; India
- Coordinates: 17.0012°N 81.7894°E
- Owner: Andhra Pradesh State Road Transport Corporation

Construction
- Parking: Yes

Other information
- Station code: RJY
Location

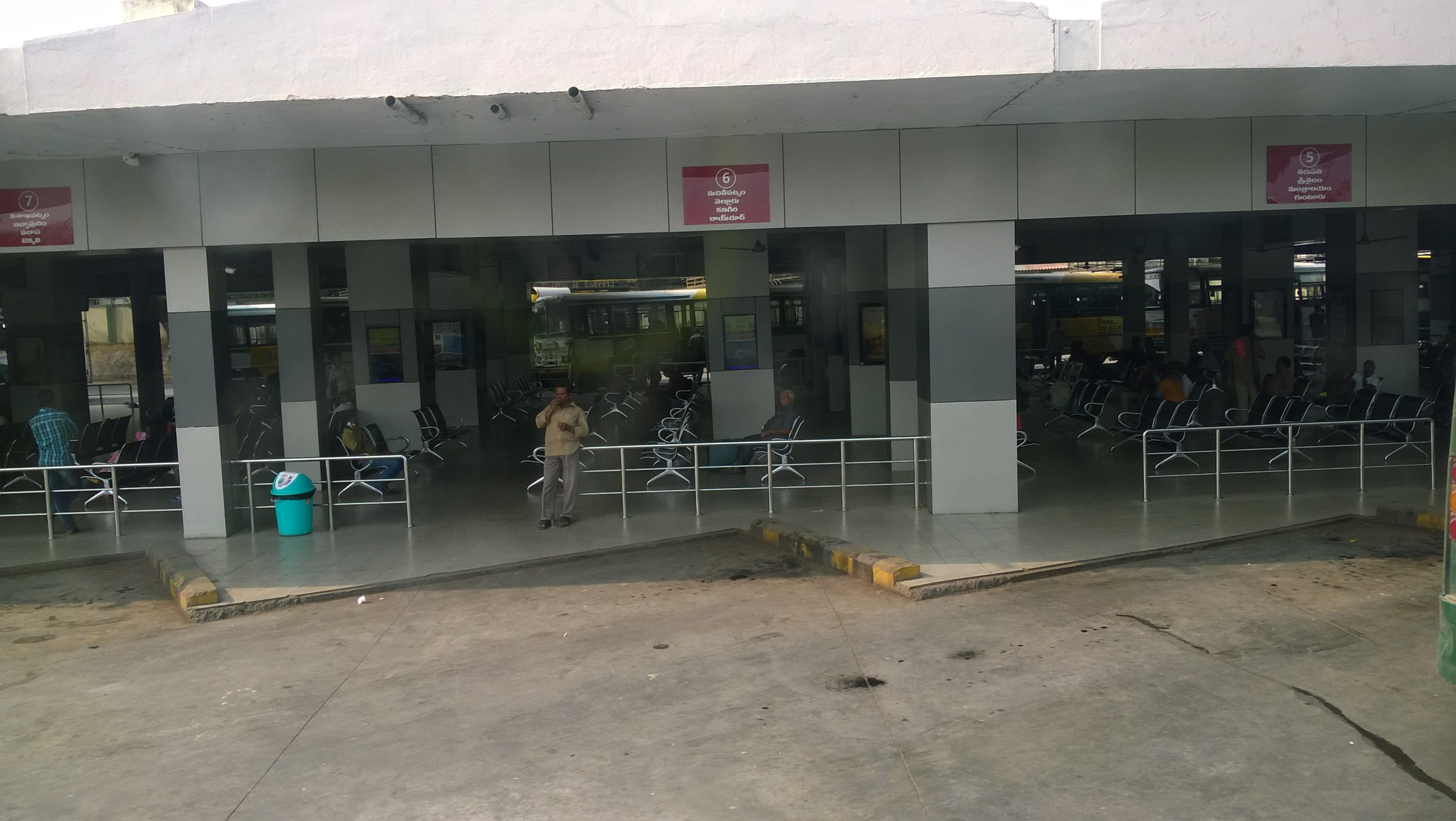
Departure block

Rajamahendravaram bus station is a bus station located in Rajamahendravaram city of the Indian state of Andhra Pradesh. It is owned by Andhra Pradesh State Road Transport Corporation. This is one of the major bus stations in the state, with services to all the cities and towns in the state and to other states like Chhattisgarh and Telangana.

== Expansion works ==
Station expansion works are proceeding while the city runs city buses from 2017 as the second phase of launching city buses in Andhra Pradesh.
