= Rajolu =

Rajolu, Rajavolu, or Razole may refer to several places in Andhra Pradesh, India:

- Rajavolu, East Godavari district, a village in Rajahmundry Rural mandal
- Rajavolu, Guntur district, a village
- Razole mandal, Konaseema district
  - Razole, Konaseema district, a town
  - Razole Assembly constituency
