= Gadala =

- Neighbourhood
- Location in Andhra Pradesh, India
- Coordinates: 17.074282°N 81.817619°E
- Country: India
- State: Andhra Pradesh
- District: East Godavari district

Languages
  - Official: Telugu
- Time zone: UTC+5:30 (IST)

Gadala is a part of Rajamahendravaram Municipal Corporation in East Godavari district of the Indian state of Andhra Pradesh. It was merged into the corporation on 18 March 2013, alongside 21 panchayats.
