= Veeravaram =

- Village
- Interactive map of Veeravaram
- Location in Andhra Pradesh, India Veeravaram (India)
- Coordinates: 16.876667°N 81.828889°E
- Country: India
- State: Andhra Pradesh
- District: East Godavari

Languages
  - Official: Telugu
- Time zone: UTC+5:30 (IST)
- PIN: 533126

Veeravaram village is located in Kadiam mandal of East Godavari district in Andhra Pradesh state, India.

== Geography ==
Veeravaram is located at 16.876667°N 81.828889°E. with an average elevation of 14 metres (46 ft).

=== Climate ===
The weather is hot and humid, with a tropical climate and, thereby, no distinct seasons. The mean maximum temperature is 32 °C. The hottest season is from April to June, with temperature ranging from 34 °C to 48 °C with maximum of 51 °C recorded in May 2002 and May 2007. The coolest months are December and January, when it is pleasant at 27 °C to 30 °C. There is heavy monsoon rain at the end of summer, with depressions in the Bay of Bengal.

Climate data for Rajahmundry
Month	Jan	Feb	Mar	Apr	May	Jun	Jul	Aug	Sep	Oct	Nov	Dec	Year
Mean daily maximum °C (°F)	28 (82)	30.7 (87.3)	33.8 (92.8)	36 (97)	37.8 (100.0)	36.3 (97.3)	32.1 (89.8)	31.9 (89.4)	32 (90)	31.2 (88.2)	28.9 (84.0)	27.9 (82.2)	32.2 (90.0)
Mean daily minimum °C (°F)	18.5 (65.3)	20.5 (68.9)	22.6 (72.7)	25.9 (78.6)	27.8 (82.0)	27 (81)	25.3 (77.5)	25.3 (77.5)	25.3 (77.5)	24.2 (75.6)	21.5 (70.7)	18.5 (65.3)	23.5 (74.4)
Average precipitation mm (inches)	3 (0.1)	6 (0.2)	11 (0.4)	21 (0.8)	67 (2.6)	142 (5.6)	260 (10.2)	187 (7.4)	177 (7.0)	197 (7.8)	37 (1.5)	7 (0.3)	1,115 (43.9)
Source: en.climate-data.org
