= Aryapuram =

- Neighborhood
- Interactive map of Aryapuram
- Location in Andhra Pradesh, India Aryapuram (India)
- Coordinates: 17.01°N 81.77°E
- Country: India
- State: Andhra Pradesh
- Region: Rajahmundry
- District: East Godavari district

Languages
  - Official: Telugu
- Time zone: UTC+5:30 (IST)
- PIN: 533104

Aryapuram is a neighborhood in Rajahmundry town, East Godavari district, Andhra Pradesh State, India.
