= Pidimgoyya =

- Village
- Interactive map of Pidimgoyya
- Location in Andhra Pradesh, India Pidimgoyya (India)
- Coordinates: 17.007176°N 81.829212°E
- Country: India
- State: Andhra Pradesh
- District: East Godavari district
- Revenue Division: Rajahmundry

Languages
  - Official: Telugu
- Time zone: UTC+5:30 (IST)
- PIN: 533107

Pidimgoyya is a village situated in East Godavari district in Rajahmundry region, in Andhra Pradesh State.
