= Rajanagaram =

- Neighbourhood
- Interactive map of Rajanagaram
- Location in Andhra Pradesh, India
- Coordinates: 17.0833°N 81.9°E
- Country: India
- State: Andhra Pradesh
- District: East Godavari
- Talukas: Rajanagaram

Government
  - MLA: Battula Balarama krishna
- Elevation: 40 m (130 ft)

Languages
  - Official: Telugu
- Time zone: UTC+5:30 (IST)
- Postal code: 533294
- Vehicle Registration: AP05 (Former); AP39 (from 30 January 2019)

Rajanagaram is a locality in Rajamahendravaram City. It also forms a part of Godavari Urban Development Authority.

== Geography ==
Rajanagaram is located at 17.0833°N 81.9°E and has an average elevation of 40 metres (130 ft). It is bounded by Gandepalle Mandal towards the North, Rangampeta Mandal towards the East, Rajahmundry Rural Mandal towards the West, and Korukonda Mandal towards the South.

== Education ==
The colleges located in and around Rajanagaram are Godavari Institute of Engineering and Technology, Adikavi Nannaya University, Aditya Engineering College, Lenora Institute of Dental Sciences etc.
