= Pottilanka =

- Village
- Interactive map of Pottilanka
- Location in Andhra Pradesh, India
- Coordinates: 16.87096°N 81.819771°E
- Country: India
- State: Andhra Pradesh
- Region: Kadiyam
- District: East Godavari district

Languages
  - Official: Telugu
- Time zone: UTC+5:30 (IST)
- PIN: 533126

Pottilanka is situated in East Godavari district in Kadiyam region, in Andhra Pradesh State, India.
