= Lalacheruvu =

Lalacheruvu APHB colony
- Neighbourhood
- Location in Andhra Pradesh, India
- Coordinates: 17°1′33.56″N 81°48′21.83″E
- Country: India
- State: Andhra Pradesh
- District: East Godavari

Languages
  - Official: Telugu
- Time zone: UTC+5:30 (IST)
- Vehicle registration: AP

Lalacheruvu is a locality in Rajamahendravaram City. It is a part of "Greater Rajamahendravaram Municipal Corporation (GRMC)". The locality also forms a part of Godavari Urban Development Authority.

== Education ==
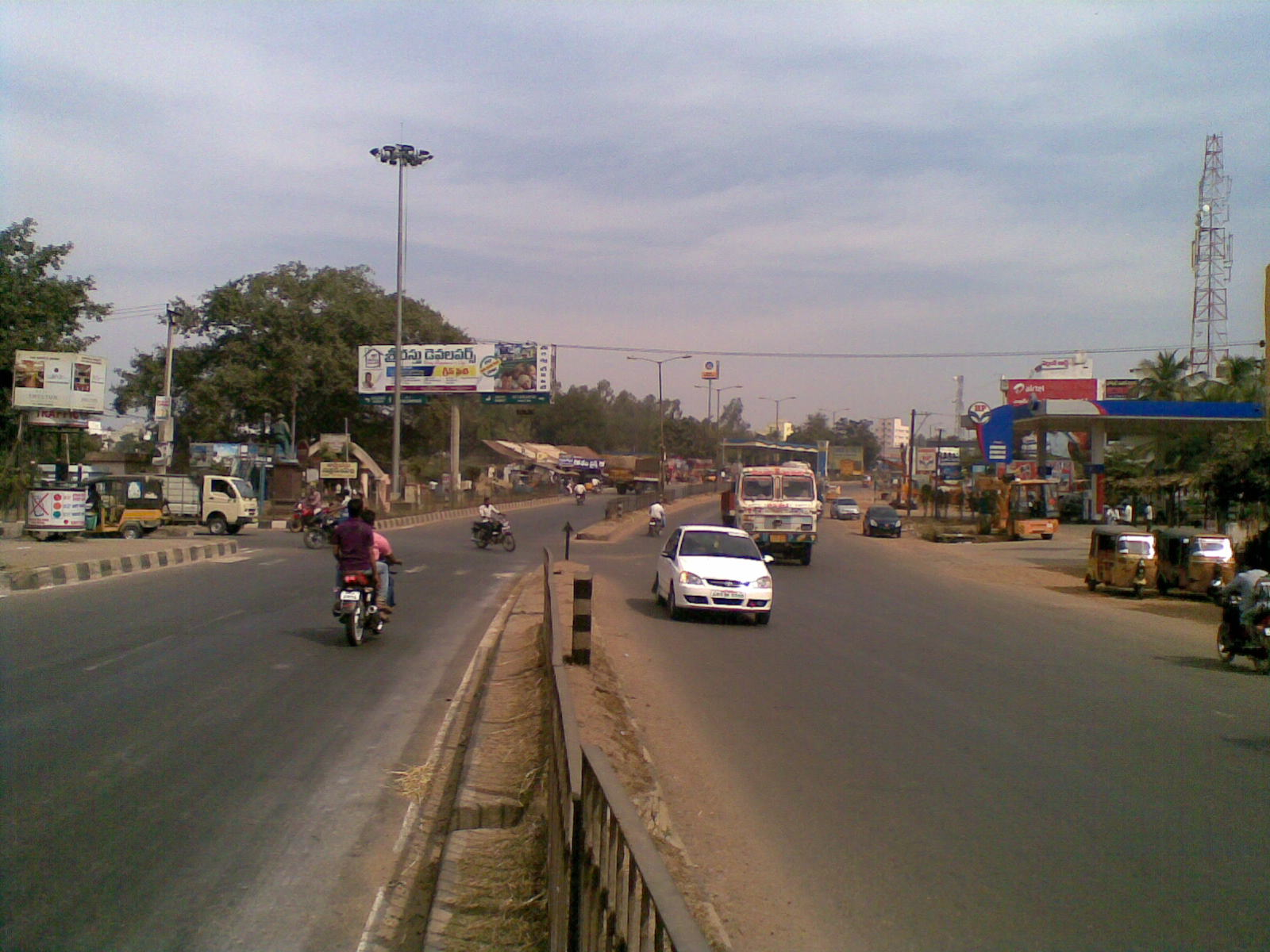
Lalacheruvu Junction

- Lalacheruvu Municipal Corporation High School
