= Katheru =

Katheru, Rajahmundry
- Neighbourhood
- Location in Andhra Pradesh, India
- Coordinates: 17.0436°N 81.7705°E
- Country: India
- State: Andhra Pradesh
- District: East Godavari

Area
  - Total: 4.40 km^{2} (1.70 sq mi)

Population (2011)
  - Total: 23,572
  - Density: 5,360/km^{2} (13,900/sq mi)

Languages
  - Official: Telugu
- Time zone: UTC+5:30 (IST)

Katheru is an area in Rajahmundry. Katheru is a part of Rajamahendravaram Municipal Corporation (GRMC). It was merged into Rajamahendravaram Municipal Corporation (GRMC) in 2026. It also forms a part of Godavari Urban Development Authority.
