= Bommuru =

- Neighbourhood
- Location in Andhra Pradesh, India
- Coordinates: 16.975655°N 81.803248°E
- Country: India
- State: Andhra Pradesh
- District: East Godavari district

Population (2011)
  - Total: 16,976

Languages
  - Official: Telugu
- Time zone: UTC+5:30 (IST)

Bommuru is a locality in Rajamahendravaram City. It is part of Greater Rajamahendravaram Municipal Corporation (GRMC). It also forms a part of Godavari Urban Development Authority.
