= Godavari district =

Former district of Madras Presidency, India

- Former district in Madras Presidency
- 1859–1925
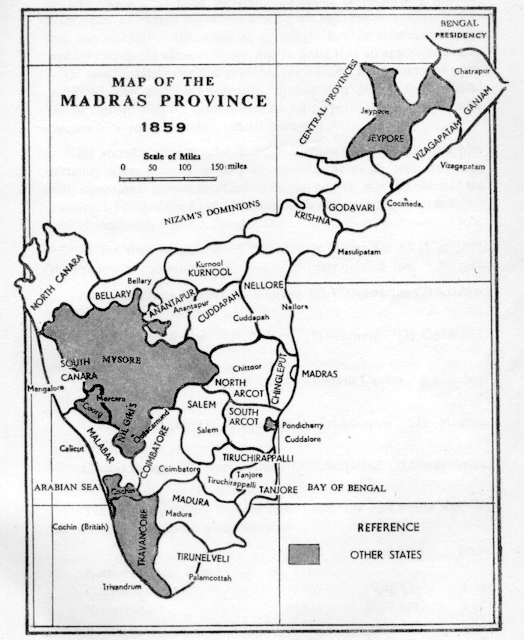
- Godavari district in Madras Presidency
- Capital: Cocanada (now Kakinada)
- History
  - District established: 1859
  - District bifurcated: 1925
Preceded by	Succeeded by
Rajahmundry District	East Godavari District

The Godavari district was an administrative region in the Madras Presidency during British India, with Kakinada (then Cocanada) as its headquarters. Established in 1859, it was formed by reorganizing the Rajahmundry, Masulipatam, and Guntur collectorates into two districts: Godavari and Kistna, with the boundary between them marked by the Upputeru and Tamaleru rivers. This restructuring followed the reorganization of the earlier Rajahmundry District, which had been created in 1802.

The district was created to address challenges in managing irrigation systems and governance in the Godavari and Krishna river deltas. The headquarters were at Kakinada, with sub-divisional offices in Rajahmundry and Narsapuram. Over time, the district expanded to include Bhadrachalam taluk in 1874 and parts of the Golgonda Agency in 1881.

The increasing administrative workload and economic growth, particularly after the construction of the Godavari anicut, necessitated a major reorganization in 1904, which transferred parts of the district to the Kistna district. The areas south and west of the Godavari River, excluding the Polavaram division, were transferred to the Kistna district. This restructuring also contributed to the formation of the Guntur district.

In 1925, the Godavari district was renamed East Godavari, with Kakinada remaining its headquarters, while West Godavari district was formed from Kistna, with Eluru as its headquarters. These names remained until 2022.

== History ==
=== District creation ===
The area that became the Godavari district underwent several administrative reorganizations before its formal establishment in 1859. Initially, it was under the jurisdiction of the Chief and Council at Masulipatam (now Machilipatnam). In 1794, it was divided into the Collectorates of Cocanada and Rajahmundry. These were consolidated into the Rajahmundry district in 1802.

In September 1859, Sir Charles Trevelyan, the Governor of Madras, visited the region to address key developmental needs, including improving the port of Cocanada (now Kakinada), expanding irrigation systems, and developing navigation on the Godavari River. His visit led to several administrative changes, including the reorganization of district boundaries.

Previously, the Rajahmundry and Masulipatnam districts had overlapping and irregular boundaries, causing administrative difficulties, particularly in the management of irrigation systems. The Godavari and Krishna river deltas, under separate jurisdiction, were also impacted. To resolve these issues, the region was split into two districts: Godavari and Krishna, with boundaries following the Upputeru and Tamileru rivers. The administrative headquarters were set at Cocanada (for the Collector), Narsapuram (for the Sub-Collector), and Rajahmundry (for the Head Assistant-Collector). This reorganization was implemented on December 16, 1859.

=== Establishment of sub-divisions ===
The growing administrative workload in Rajahmundry led to the creation of a Sub-Collector position in the 1830s. Initially, most of the land was under zemindari control, with limited government intervention. However, as more estates lapsed or were acquired by the government, the responsibilities of the Collector expanded. In 1853, Sir Henry Montgomery recommended the appointment of a Sub-Collector to assist the Collector in managing the district.

The Sub-Collector's headquarters was set at Narsapuram, overseeing the southern and western taluks, including fertile delta regions. Henry Forbes, the first Sub-Collector, operated primarily from Dowleswaram and Rajahmundry. Over the next decade, leadership in the role changed frequently, with nine different Sub-Collectors appointed due to promotions and administrative challenges.

In 1866, proposals were made to relocate various administrative offices. Among the suggestions was moving the Collector's headquarters to Rajahmundry and adjusting the locations of other officials. Despite these discussions, the Collector's office remained in Cocanada, given its importance as a growing port. The final administrative structure stationed the Sub-Collector at Rajahmundry, the Head Assistant-Collector at Eluru, and the Deputy Collector at Narsapuram, streamlining governance across the region.

Subsequent expansions included the addition of Bhadrachalam taluk in 1874 and two muttas from the Golgonda Agency in 1881, further shaping the district's boundaries.

=== Reorganisation ===
The Godavari district underwent significant administrative changes as its wealth, population, and importance grew, particularly after the Godavari anicut's irrigation system came into full effect. The resulting economic boom made the district too large for a single Collector to manage effectively. In response, a major reorganization took place in 1904.

The areas south and west of the Godavari River, excluding the Polavaram division, were transferred to the Kistna district. This restructuring also contributed to the formation of the Guntur district, easing the administrative burden on Kistna.

In 1925, the Godavari district was renamed as East Godavari, with Kakinada continuing as its headquarters, while West Godavari district was formed from Kistna district, with Eluru as its headquarters. These districts retained their names until 2022.
