= Adikavi Nannaya University =

University in Andhra Pradesh, India

- Type: Public
- Established: 22 April 2006; 20 years ago
- Affiliations: UGC
- Chancellor: Governor of Andhra Pradesh
- Vice-Chancellor: Sathupati Prasanna Sree
- Location: Rajahmundry, Andhra Pradesh, India; 17°1′1.44″N 81°46′57.87″E
- Campus: Urban
- Website: https://aknu.edu.in/

Adikavi Nannaya University (IAST: Ādikavi Nannaya Viśvavidyālayamu) is a state university located in Rajahmundry in Andhra Pradesh, India. It was established on 22 April 2006 through the Government of Andhra Pradesh Act No. 28 of 2006.

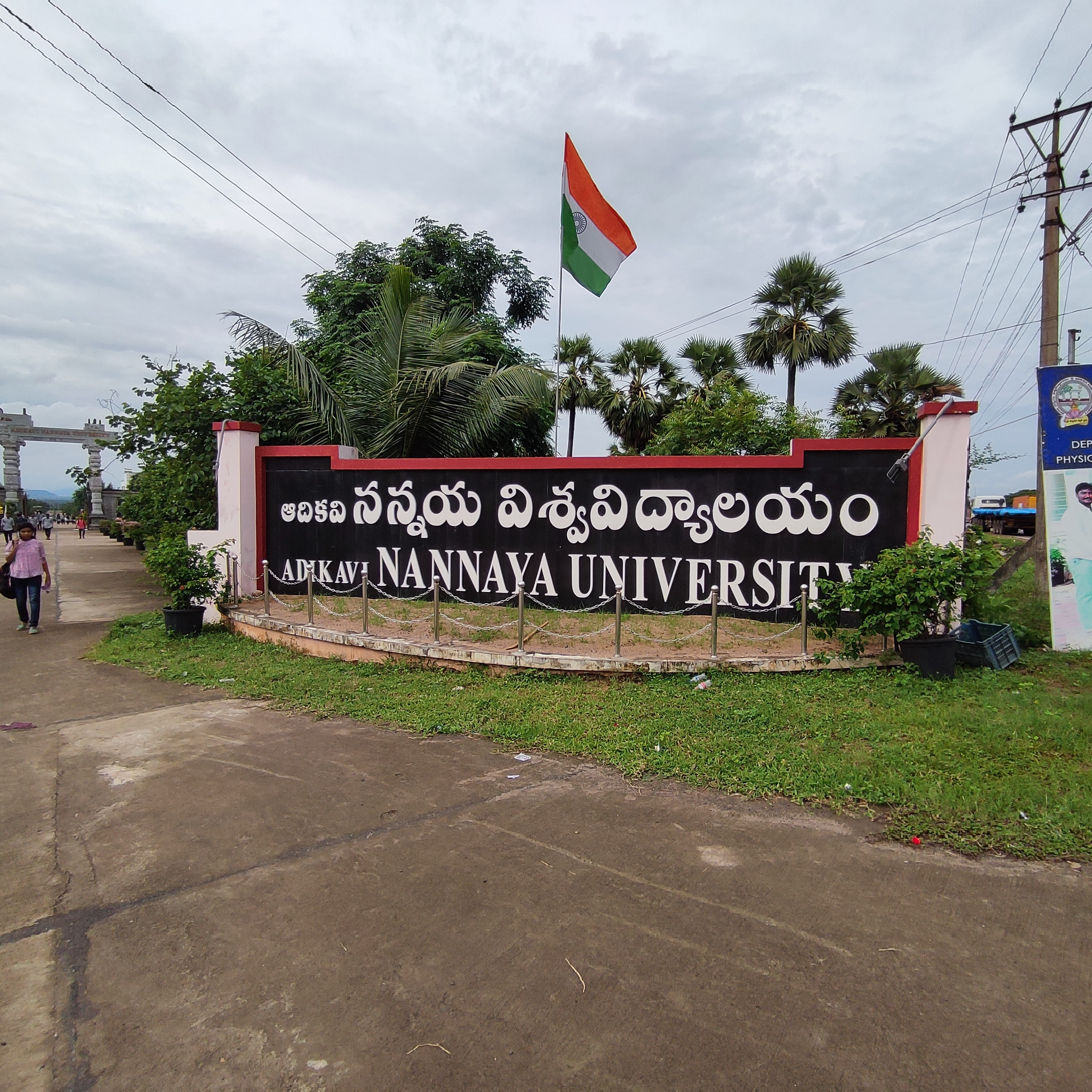
Adikavi Nannaya University University in Andhra Pradesh

It is named after Nannayya, the first attested author of a text composed in the Telugu language. The university attends to the educational needs of both Godavari districts. Currently, all seventy-four postgraduate institutes as well as the undergraduate colleges located within the aforementioned districts maintain their government-mandated university affiliation with Adikavi Nannaya University. These colleges were previously affiliated with Andhra University.

The University also hosts four Constituent Colleges namely: University College of Arts and Commerce, University College of Education, University College of Engineering and University College of Science and Technology.

Adikavi Nannaya University has extension campus at Kakinada and Tadepalligudem.

The university initiated a program in Geo-Informatics and Petroleum Exploration, the first of its kind in Andhra Pradesh and one of the few in the country. In the second phase, keeping in view of the government policy of encouraging five-year integrated courses, the university designed and offered a new course in Mathematics and Computing, with the objective of providing trained programmes to the I.T. industry.

== See also ==
- List of universities in India
- Universities and colleges in India
- Education in India
