= Konthamuru =

- Neighbourhood
- Interactive map of Konthamuru
- Location in Andhra Pradesh, India Konthamuru (India)
- Coordinates: 17.046609°N 81.797749°E
- Country: India
- State: Andhra Pradesh
- Region: Rajahmundry Rural
- District: East Godavari district

Languages
  - Official: Telugu
- Time zone: UTC+5:30 (IST)
- PIN: 533102

Konthamuru is a locality in Rajamahendravaram City. It is a part of "Greater Rajamahendravaram Municipal Corporation (GRMC)".
