= Kadiyapulanka =

- Neighbourhood
- Interactive map of Kadiyapulanka
- Location in Andhra Pradesh, India Kadiyapulanka (India)
- Coordinates: 16.8930584°N 81.814238°E
- Country: India
- State: Andhra Pradesh
- District: East Godavari

Languages
  - Official: Telugu
- Time zone: UTC+5:30 (IST)
- PIN: 533126

Kadiyapulanka is a locality in Rajamahendravaram City.

== Economy ==
An important industry for Kadiyapulanka is horticulture, with the area's nurseries exporting flowers throughout India. Another is tourism. The place hosted the Eighth All-India Nurserymen's Convention.
