= Madhurapudi =

- Neighborhood
- Interactive map of Madhurapudi
- Location in Andhra Pradesh, India Madhurapudi (India)
- Coordinates: 17°05′50″N 81°48′45″E
- Country: India
- State: Andhra Pradesh
- Region: Rajahmundry
- District: East Godavari district

Population (2011)
  - Total: 2,719

Languages
  - Official: Telugu
- Time zone: UTC+5:30 (IST)
- PIN: 533102

Madhurapudi is a locality in Rajamahendravaram. It is a part of "Greater Rajamahendravaram Municipal Corporation (GRMC)".
