= Palacherla =

- Village
- Interactive map of Palacherla
- Location in Andhra Pradesh, India Palacherla (India)
- Coordinates: 17.076764°N 81.839426°E
- Country: India
- State: Andhra Pradesh
- District: East
- Mandal: Rajanagaram

Languages
  - Official: Telugu
- Time zone: UTC+5:30 (IST)
- PIN: 533102

Palacherla is a village situated in Rajanagaram mandal, East Godavari district of Andhra Pradesh State, India.
