= Vemagiri =

Vemagiri (an area in Rajahmundry)
- locality
- Interactive map of Vemagiri (an area in Rajahmundry)
- Location in Andhra Pradesh, India Vemagiri (an area in Rajahmundry) (India)
- Coordinates: 16.933661°N 81.805717°E
- Country: India
- State: Andhra Pradesh
- District: East Godavari district
- MANDAL: Kadiam

Population (2011)
  - Total: 14,613

Languages
  - Official: Telugu
- Time zone: UTC+5:30 (IST)
- PIN: 533125

Vemagiri is an area in Rajamahendravaram City in the Indian state of Andhra Pradesh. Vemagiri is a part of Rajamahendravaram Municipal Corporation (RMC)".
