= Diwancheruvu =

- hamlet
- Interactive map of Diwancheruvu
- Location in Andhra Pradesh, India Diwancheruvu (India)
- Coordinates: 17.044°N 81.843°E
- Country: India
- State: Andhra Pradesh
- District: East Godavari
- Talukas: Rajanagaram Mandal

Population (2001)
  - Total: 11,372

Languages
  - Official: Telugu
- Time zone: UTC+5:30 (IST)
- PIN: 533296

Diwancheruvu is a hamlet in Rajanagaram mandal, East Godavari district, Andhra Pradesh, India. It is part of Godavari Urban Development authority.
