= Rajanagaram mandal =

Rajanagaram Mandal
- Mandal
- Interactive Map Outlining mandal
- Country: India
- State: Andhra Pradesh
- District: East Godavari

Area
  - Total: 234.82 km^{2} (90.66 sq mi)
- Time zone: UTC+5:30 (IST)

Rajanagaram Mandal is one of the 19 mandals in East Godavari District of Andhra Pradesh. As per census 2011, there are 17 villages. Most of the part of Rajanagaram Mandal is under the jurisdiction of "Greater Rajamahendravaram Municipal Corporation (GRMC)". Rajanagaram Mandal has total population of 106,085 as per the Census 2011 out of which 53,345 are males while 52,740 are females and the Average Sex Ratio of Rajanagaram Mandal is 989. The total literacy rate of Rajanagaram Mandal is 64.39%. The male literacy rate is 58% and the female literacy rate is 56.51%.

== Villages ==
- Palacherla

== See also ==
- List of mandals in Andhra Pradesh
