= Dowleswaram =

Dowleswaram, Rajahmundry city
- Neighbourhood
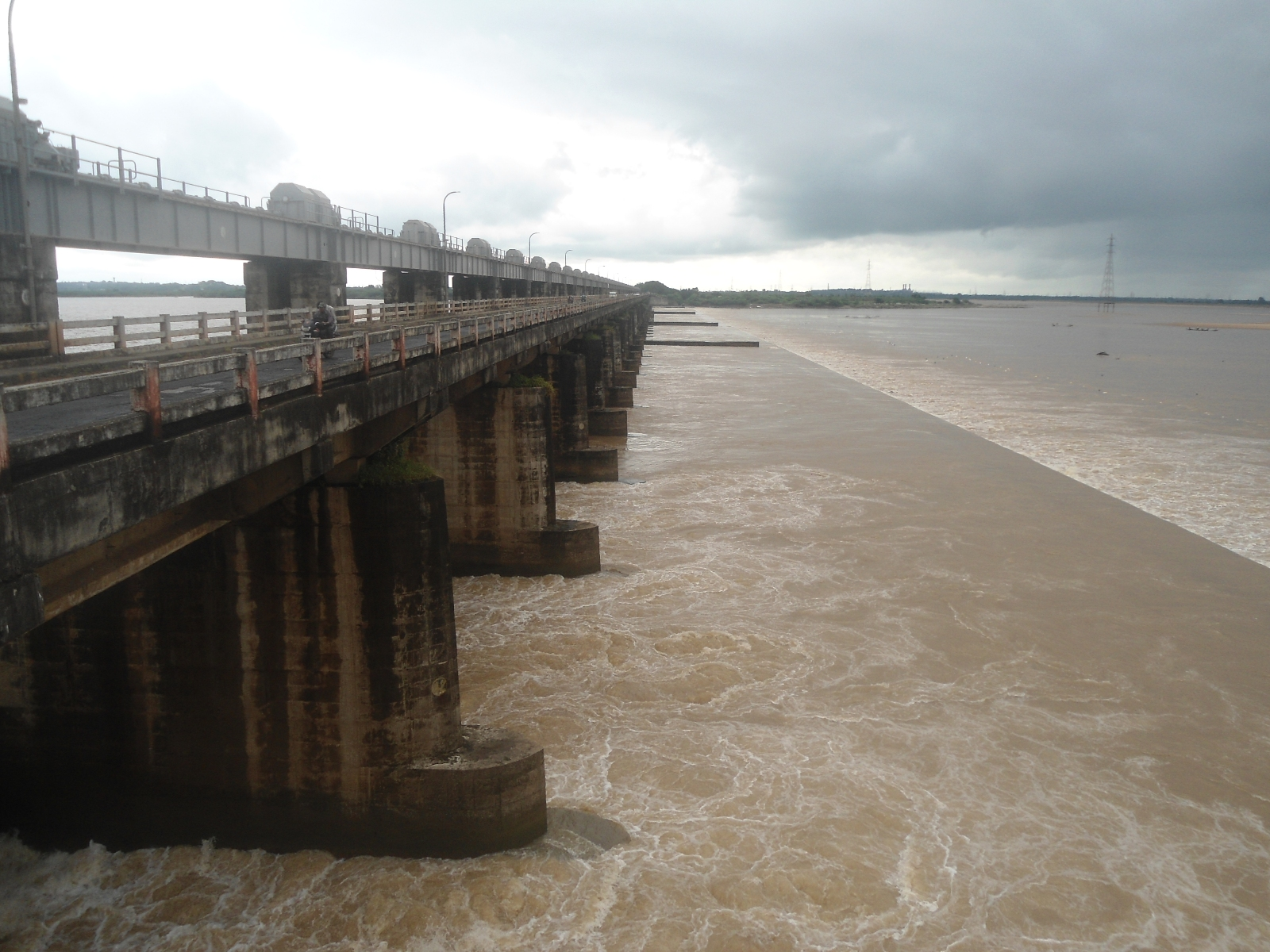
- Dowleswaram Barrage

- Location in Andhra Pradesh, India
- Coordinates: 16.955567°N 81.793124°E
- Country: India
- State: Andhra Pradesh
- District: East Godavari

Area
  - Total: 7.67 km^{2} (2.96 sq mi)

Population (2011)
  - Total: 44,637
  - Density: 5,820/km^{2} (15,100/sq mi)

Languages
  - Official: Telugu
- Time zone: UTC+5:30 (IST)
- PIN: 533125

Dowleswaram is a part of Rajamahendravaram Municipal Corporation (RMC). Dowleswaram is an area in Rajahmundry. It also forms a part of Godavari Urban Development Authority.

== Landmarks ==
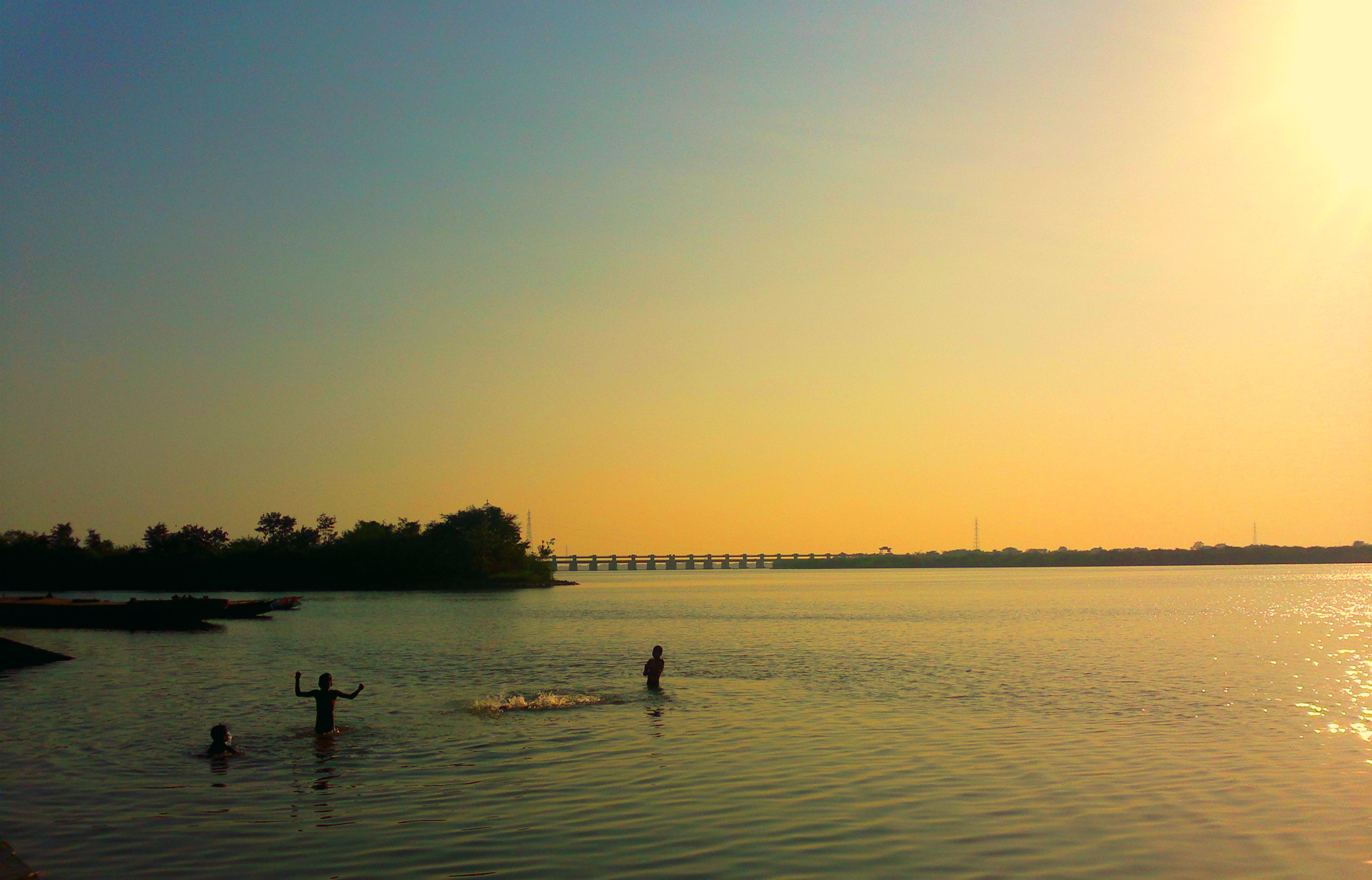
Sunset View at Dowleswaram Godavari

Sir Arthur Cotton built the Dowleswaram Barrage across the Godavari in Dowleswaram. The Sir Arthur Cotton Museum, where projects relating to irrigation works are displayed, was named in his honour.
