= Rajamahendravaram Municipal Corporation =

Local civic body in Rajamahendravarm, Andhra Pradesh, India

Rajamahendravaram Municipal Corporation Rājamahēndravaraṁ Nagara Pālaka Samstha రాజమహేంద్రవరం నగర పాలక సంస్థ
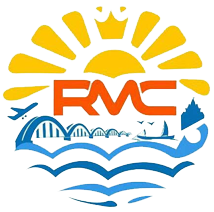

History
- Founded: 1994

Leadership
- Mayor: Vacant
- Deputy Mayor: Vacant

Structure
- Seats: 50
- Political groups: Vacant

Elections
- Last election: 2014
- Next election: 2025 expected

Meeting place
- RMC Office, Behind 3 Town Police Station, Rajamahendravaram

Website
- rmc.ap.gov.in

Rajamahendravaram Municipal Corporation (RMC) is the civic body that governs the city of Rajamahendravaram in the Indian state of Andhra Pradesh. It is spread over an area of 44.50 km^{2} (17.18 sq mi).

== History ==
The Municipal Corporation mechanism in India was introduced during British Rule with formation of municipal corporation in Madras (Chennai) in 1688 and later followed by municipal corporations in Bombay (Mumbai) and Calcutta (Kolkata) by 1762.

Rajahmundry municipal corporation is one of the oldest corporations which started in the year 1866. It was headed by the British till 1884 and when they had permitted contesting for municipal chairman elections. N. Subba Rao Pantulu served in this municipal corporation. First Chief Minister of Andhra Pradesh Tanguturi Prakasam Panthulu also won as chairman in 1903. Zamindar of Dharmavaram Kanchumarthi Ramachandra Rao and many others took active participation in it. Vogeti Ramakrishnayya garu served as municipal councilor for a long time. Nidamarthi Durgaiah, Mocherla Ramchandra Rao, Eluri Lakshmi Narasimham etc. acted as chairman for this council. In 1994 Rajahmundry Municipality is upgraded to Rajahmundry Municipal Corporation. Maturi Srinivasa Chakravarthi was the first mayor of the city.

== Administration ==
Rajamahendravaram Municipal Corporation (RMC) is administered by an elected body, headed by the Mayor. As per the 2011 Census of India, the city population was 3,41,831 with a metro population of 419,818. The present municipal commissioner is Ketan Garg.

== Mayors ==
List of Mayors of Rajamahendravaram Municipal Corporation
S.No	Mayor	Dy Mayor	Term start	Term end	Party	Notes
1	Maturi Srinivasa Chakravarthi		2000	2005	Telugu Desam Party	First Mayor
2	Adireddy Veera Raghavamma	B.S.Prasad	2007	2012	Telugu Desam Party	First Women Mayor
3	Pantham Rajani Sesha Sai	Vasireddy Rambabu	2015	2019	Telugu Desam Party	

== Elections ==
Elections to the Rajamahendravarm Municipal Corporation were held in 2014. The results are as follows:

S.No.	Party name	Symbol	Won
1	Telugu Desam Party		34
2	YSR Congress Party		8
3	Independents		5
4	Bharatiya Janata Party		1
5	Bahujan Samaj Party		1
6	Indian National Congress		1

After the term expired, elections were not held due to the matter regarding merger of surrounding villages into the corporation and the formation of Greater Rajamahendravaram Municipal Corporation which is sub judice

== Functions ==
Rajamahendravaram Municipal Corporation is created for the following functions:

- Planning for the town including its surroundings which are covered under its Department's Urban Planning Authority .
- Approving construction of new buildings and authorising use of land for various purposes.
- Improvement of the town's economic and Social status.
- Arrangements of water supply towards commercial, residential and industrial purposes.
- Planning for fire contingencies through Fire Service Departments.
- Creation of solid waste management, public health system and sanitary services.
- Working for the development of ecological aspect like development of Urban Forestry and making guidelines for environmental protection.
- Working for the development of weaker sections of the society like mentally and physically handicapped, old age and gender biased people.
- Making efforts for improvement of slums and poverty removal in the town.

== Wards ==
There are 50 wards under the jurisdiction of Rajamahendravarm Municipal Corporation(RMC) which may increase further to 52 after the inclusion of surrounding areas including Torredu, Katheru, Bommuru among others.

List of Wards in Rajamahendravaram Municipal Corporation
Ward Number	Area
1	Battina Nagar, Subba Rao peta, Spinning Mills Colony, Cycle Colony, Janardhana Nagar, F.C.I Godowns, Narayanapuam (part), Reddy gari Layout, VAMBAY Buildings, GAIL, Baba Nagar, Putta Pullayya Layout
2	Narayanapuram (part), Gopal Nagar puntha, Central Jail, Addepalli Colony, Gangotri Apartments.
3	Nehru Nagar, Subbaraopeta, Rajendra Nagar (part)
4	Rajendra Nagar (part), Rajya Lakshmi College (part), Uppara peta
5	Matham Veedhi Area, Kambalapeta, Kambala Cheruvu, Schade Girls High School, Government Arts College, S.K.V.T School and S.K.V.T.College, Gandhipuram-I, Rajya Lakshmi College (part), Anand Regency Hotel
6	Annapurnammapeta part, Reserve Police Lines, Jampeta Area part, Cemetery peta-II
7	Danavaipeta part, Addepalli College etc., Gorakshanapeta-I
8	Danavaipeta part, Prakash Nagar, TTD Kalyana Mandapam etc.,
9	Koka Bhaskaramma Nagar, Sarada Nagar, A.K.C College, S.B.I Colony, Ground Water Layout area, Venkateswara Nagar, Vidyut Colony, Burma Colony, Police Quarters, Taraka Rama Nagar etc.,
10	V.L.Puram-II (Telukula Tank area), Vaka Gardens, Vadrevu Nagar part, Sri Nagar, Model project layout area, All Bank Colony, Lolugu Nagar, RTC Colony, ILTD Research Centre, ONGC Base complex, Padmavathi Nagar, ONGC Officers Colony Layout, Gadalamma Nagar Layout area, Horlicks Factory Layout area, Vastu laya Layout area, Hanuman Nagar, Sai Chaitanya Nagar, Morampudi Area, Alakapuri Layout I, II & III Area
11	Mallina Nagar, Manthena Gardens, Vadrevu Nagar part, V.L.Puram I etc.
12	Syamala Nagar, Postal Colony, Official Colony, Prasanthi Estates, RTC Complex, SBI Colony, Katari Gardens, Gandhipuram-III, Aditya College
13	Ambedkarnagar, Gorakshanapeta, Konala Nookaraju Layout part, N.V.R School
14	Konala Nookaraju part, M.G.M.Chandana Complex area, Brodipeta part, D.M.H School
15	Brodipeta part, Thadithota, Rehmat Nagar, Ayyappa Nagar etc.,
16	Veerabhadra Nagar, Shanthipuram, Awa Area, Railway Mixed High School, Adarsha Nagar, Balajipeta, Railway Quarters, ILTD Company etc.,
17	Boggula Dibba, RCM Area, Ambica Nagar, Sambhu Nagar, Sai Krishna Nagar, Lutheran Hospital, High School Swarajya Nagar, Coir Board Area.
18	A.C.Gardens part, Ratna Plastics, Government Forest Depot
19	A.C.Gardens part, Railway Station, Railway Quarters, Five Carts Area, Railway goods area
20	A.C.Gardens area part, M.R.O office, II Town Police station, T.Nagar part
21	T.Nagar part, Vullithota veedhi area etc.
22	Kambham Choultry area, Vankayalavari veedhi area, Nalam Bheemaraju area, Markandeyeswara Temple area, I Town Police station area
23	Rangreejupeta area, Grandhivari area, Chanda choultry area
24	Town Hall area, Vegetable Market area, Pappula street area, Mochi street area, Nallamandhu sandhu area, Seethammasandhu area, Meraka Veedhi area, Aparala shop area
25	Rambha, Urvasi, Menaka Theatres area, Jamindhari Chintalavari area, Mochi vari area, Akulavari area, Grandhivari area, Kaspa vari area, Training college area
26	Innispeta part, Kotipalli Bus stand area
27	Innispeta area part, Rama Krishna rao peta, V.T.College, Government Girls High School, Head post office etc.
28	Mutyalamma gudi veedhi, Stadium, Goleela Dibba, Mangalavarapupeta, Sigideelapeta etc.
29	Kothapeta, Gubel peta
30	Bestha veedhi church, Square churchpeta, Medarapeta etc.
31	Annapurnammapeta, Madana Singh peta
32	Lakshmivarapu peta, Jampeta, Gubbaka veedhi, Pitchuka Veedhi, Mochi Veedhi
33	Lakshmivarapu peta, Kandakam Road, Subrahmanyam Mydanam, Godavari Station, Gowthami Grandhalayam Area etc.
34	Municipal Corporation, NGO's Home, Forest Office, District Munsif Court, Aryapuram part, Gokavaram Bus stand area etc.,
35	Korlampeta, Sambasivarao peta part etc.
36	Sambasivaraopeta part, Kantipudi Shopping complex, Thummalava part, Aademmadibba
37	Veerabhadrapuram part, Haripuram, Lalitha Nagar part, Jayakrishnapuram, Ganesh Nagar
38	Seethampeta, Veerabhadrapuram part, Lalitha Nagar part, ESI Hospital etc.,
39	Lingampeta, Krishna Nagar, Thummalava, Jayaram Nataraj Theatres etc.,
40	Seethampeta, Bruhannalapeta, Timberyard area, Aryapuram part
41	Kotilingalapeta, A.P.P Mills, Luthergiri area, Chukka vari area, Sri Ram Nagar part
42	Lalitha Nagar, Haripuram part, Municipal Colony, CTRI Quarters, Ratnampeta
43	Vidya Nagar, R.V.Nagar, Weavers Colony, Jail Warders Old Quarters, Mallikarjuna Nagar part
44	Mallikarjuna Nagar, Vishal puram, Venkateswara Nagar, Gajendra Nagar, P&T Colony, Raja Theatre area, Indira Satya Nagar puntha part, Sanjeeva Nagar part
45	Indira Nagar, Gadireddi Nagar, A.P.P.Mills Quarters, Sivalayam, R&B Work shop area
46	Anand Nagar, A.P.P.Mills Employees Layout area, Ramdaspeta, Venkata puram, Chitti Sanjeeva Nagar
47	Sarangadhara Metta, Indira Satya Nagar puntha part, Seshagiri Nagar, Mehar Nagar, Siddartha Nagar, Eswar Nagar etc.
48	Sanjeevayya Nagar part, Burma Colony etc.
49	Subbarao Nagar, Simhachala Nagar
50	R&B Guest House, DSP Bunglow, R&B Quarters, District Magistrate Bunglow, Jail Superintendent Bunglow, Suviseshapuram, Government General Hospital, Subrahmanya Nagar, CTRI, Durga Nagar puntha, Annayachari Road, Bhaskar Nagar, Gandhipuram-IV, Revenue Employees Layout, State Bank Colony, Murthy Industries Layout, Chowdeswara Nagar, P&T Quarters, Lalacheruvu, Central Excise Layout area.

== Revenue sources ==
The RMC has income sources for the corporation from the Central and State Governments.Tax related revenue for the Corporation include property tax, profession tax, entertainment tax, grants from Central and State Government like Goods and Services Tax and advertisement tax. Non-tax related revenue for the corporation are water usage charges, fees from documentation services, rent received from municipal property and funds from municipal bonds..The Municipal Corporation is also operating a Petrol Bunk near Quarry Market junction generating a revenue of around 10 lakhs per month.
