= Kadiyam =

- Neighbourhood
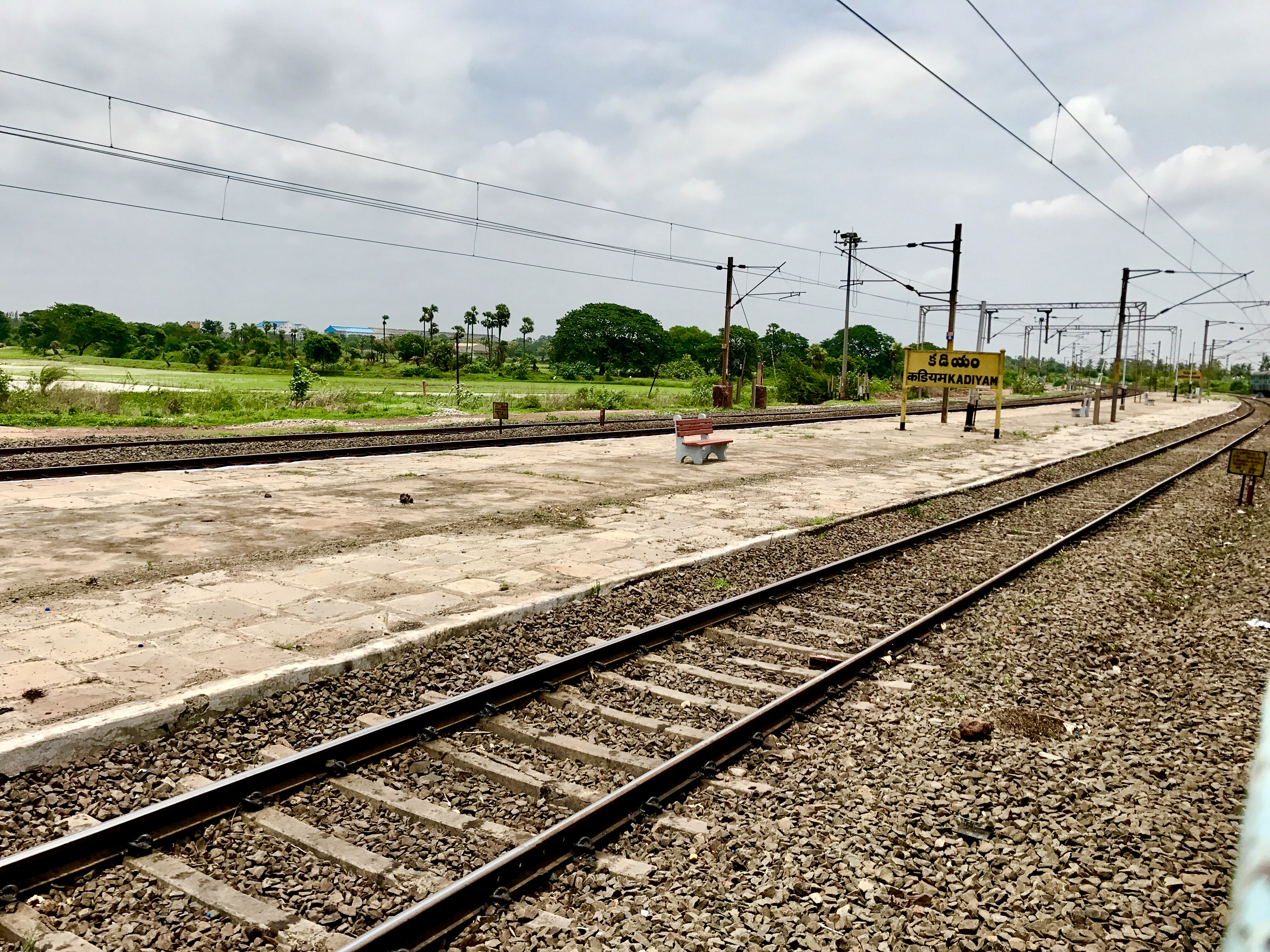
- Kadiyam railway station
- Interactive map of Kadiyam
- Location in Andhra Pradesh, India Kadiyam (India)
- Coordinates: 16.9167°N 81.8333°E
- Country: India
- State: Andhra Pradesh
- District: East Godavari
- Talukas: Kadiam

Government
  - Type: Panchayat
- Elevation: 8 m (26 ft)

Population (2011)
  - Total: 37,142

Languages
  - Official: Telugu
- Time zone: UTC+5:30 (IST)
- Vehicle Registration: AP05 (Former); AP39 (from 30 January 2019)

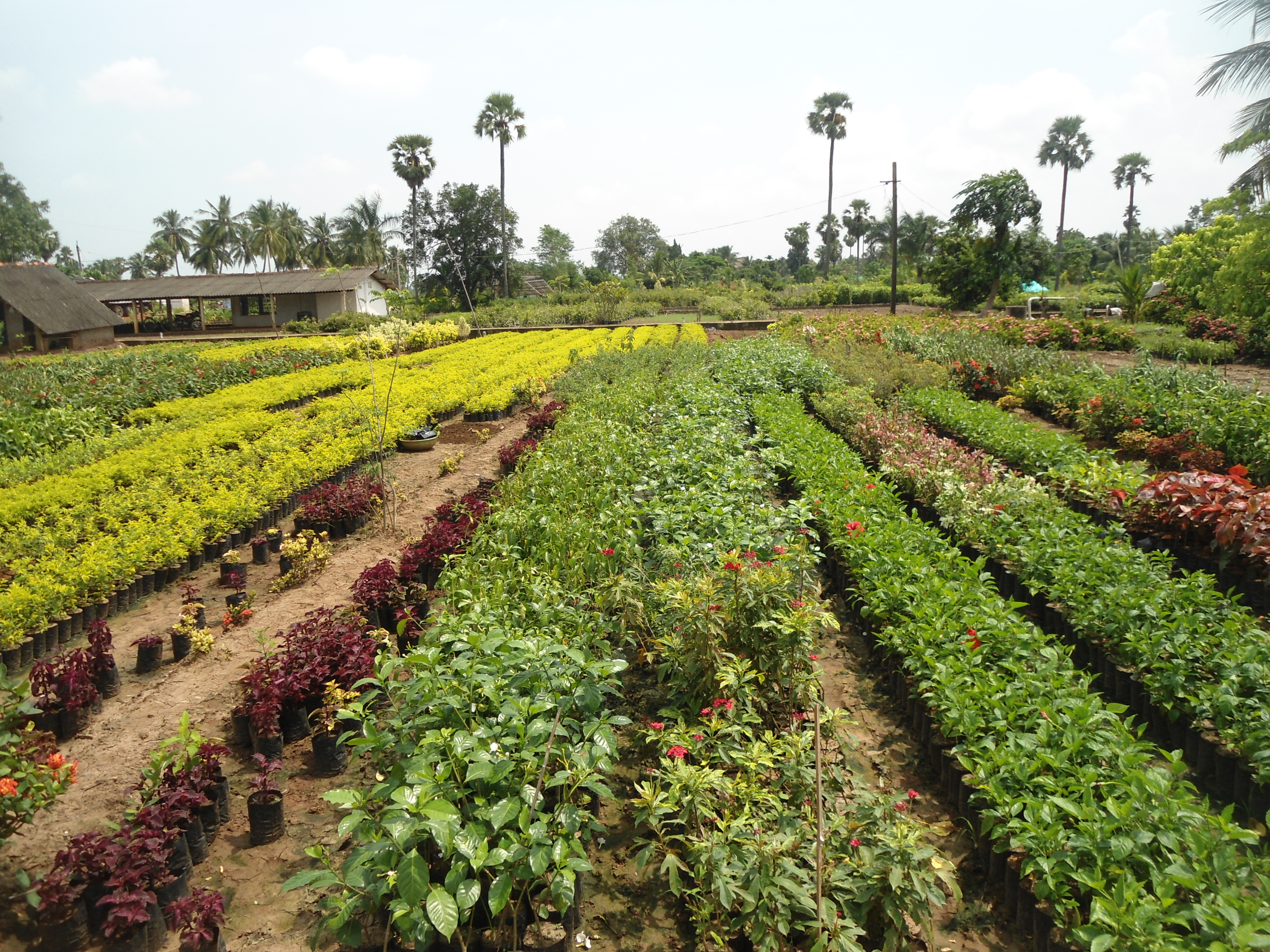
Nursery in Kadiyam, Rajamahendravaram

Kadiyam is a locality in Rajamahendravaram City, India.

== Geography ==
Kadiyam is located at 16.9167°N 81.8333°E. It has an average elevation (29 feet).

== Assembly constituency ==
Kadiyam is an assembly constituency in Andhra Pradesh. There are 2,43,229 registered voters in Kadiyam constituency in 1999 elections.

List of Elected Members:

- 1978 - Patamsetti Ammiraju
- 1983, 1998 - Girajala Venkataswamy Naidu (Ex MLA & Ex MP)
- 1985 and 1994 - Vaddi Veerabhadra Rao
- 1989, 1999 and 2004 - Jakkampudi Rammohan Rao
- 2009- Chandana Ramesh
- 2014 to 2019 - gorantla bucchayya chowdary
