= Kakinada Urban Development Authority =

Urban planning agency in Andhra Pradesh

Kakinada Urban Development Authority (KAUDA)

Agency overview
- Formed: 4 November 2016
- Type: Urban Planning Agency
- Jurisdiction: Government of Andhra Pradesh
- Headquarters: Kakinada; 16°57′58″N 82°15′18″E
- Agency executive: R. C. Deepthi, Chairperson
- Website: kauda.ap.gov.in

The Kakinada Urban Development Authority (KAUDA), split from the earlier Godavari Urban Development Authority (GUDA), is an urban planning agency spread over the district of Kakinada in the Indian state of Andhra Pradesh. It was constituted on 4 November 2016, under Andhra Pradesh Metropolitan Region and Urban Development Authority Act, 2020 with the headquarters located at Kakinada. R. C. Deepthi as Chairperson.

== Jurisdiction ==
The jurisdictional area of KAUDA is spread over an area of 4,387.66 km^{2} (1,694.08 sq mi) and it covers 598 villages in 53 mandals of the district. The urban local bodies in the jurisdiction covers, two municipal corporations of Rajahmundry and Kakinada; municipalities viz., Samalkot, Peddapuram Pithapuram,Gollaprolu Ramachandrapuram, Mandapeta, Yeleswaram, Amalapuram, Mummidivaram, Tuni.

Recent notification by Govt. (28/01/2020) which increase the purview of KAUDA.

ULBs:

1 Amalapuram

2 Mandapeta

3 Mummidivaram

4 Yeleswaram

No. of Villages and Areas (km^{2}) Covered Recently in Different Mandals.

1 Kadiam 3 villages 20.12

2 Mandapeta 6 villages 44.51

3 Anaparti 6 villages 29.99

4 Biccavolu 6 villages 31.88

5 Pedapudi 10 villages 45.17

6 Yeleswaram (Part) 5 villages 32.60

7 Alamuru 15 villages 78.32

8 Kapileswararapuram 15 villages 104.25

9 Rayavaram 10 villages 79.83

10 Pamarru 24 villages 98.62

11 Kajuluru 20 villages 116.36

12 Amalapuram 16 villages 75.14

13 Kakinada Rural (Part) 2 villages (Part) 5.18

14 Thondangi (Part) 1 village (Part) 8.87

15 Mummidivaram 10 villages 70.69

16 Uppalaguptam (Part) 3 villages 19.08

17 Gokavaram 15 villages 166.34

18 Razole (Part) 9 villages 54.07

19 I.Polavaram 11 villages 128.19

20 Tuni 11 villages 65.20

21 Allavaram (Part) 3 villages 21.35

22 Mamidikuduru (Part) 14 villages 58.25

23 Seethanagaram 12 villages 138.87

24 Korukonda 9 villages 91.78

24. Pithapuram Rural 25 villages 197.9
