= Simhapuri Express =

Passenger train in India

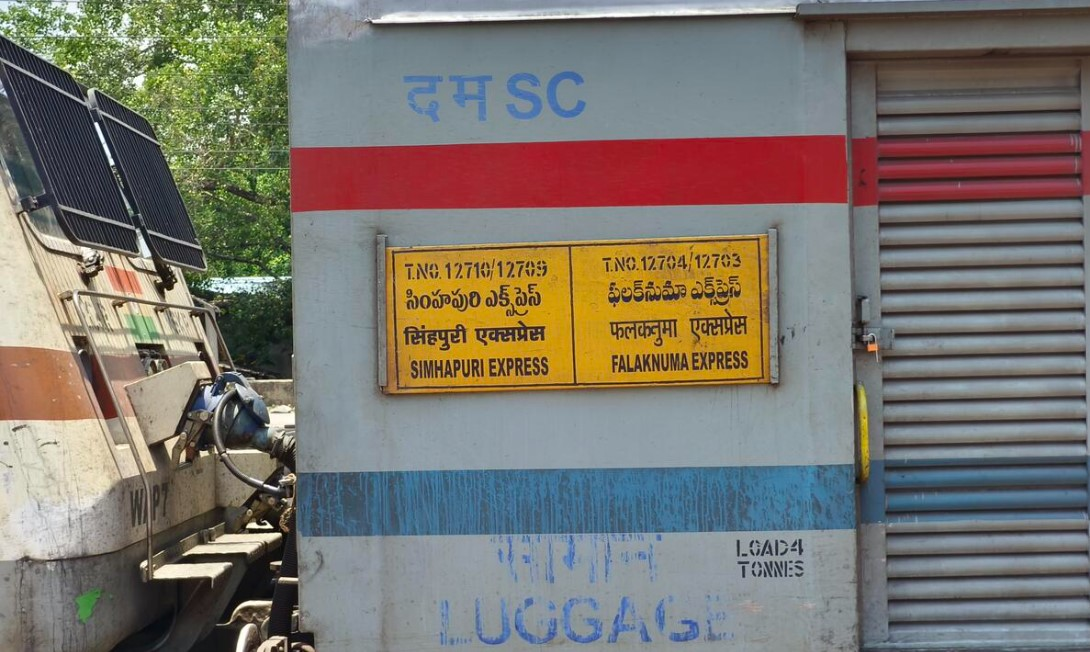

Overview
- Service type: Superfast
- Locale: Andhra Pradesh & Telangana
- First service: 27 October 2005; 20 years ago
- Current operator: South Central Railway

Route
- Termini: Secunderabad (SC); Gudur (GDR)
- Stops: 15
- Distance travelled: 643 km (400 mi)
- Average journey time: 10 hours 45 mins
- Service frequency: Daily
- Train number: 12709 / 12710

On-board services
- Classes: AC first, AC 2 Tier, AC 3 Economy, Sleeper Class, General Unreserved
- Seating arrangements: Yes
- Sleeping arrangements: Yes
- Catering facilities: E-catering
- Observation facilities: Rake sharing with 12703 / 12704 Falaknuma Express
- Baggage facilities: Available
- Other facilities: Below the seats

Technical
- Rolling stock: LHB coach
- Track gauge: 1,676 mm (5 ft 6 in)
- Operating speed: 59 km/h (37 mph) average including halts
Route map
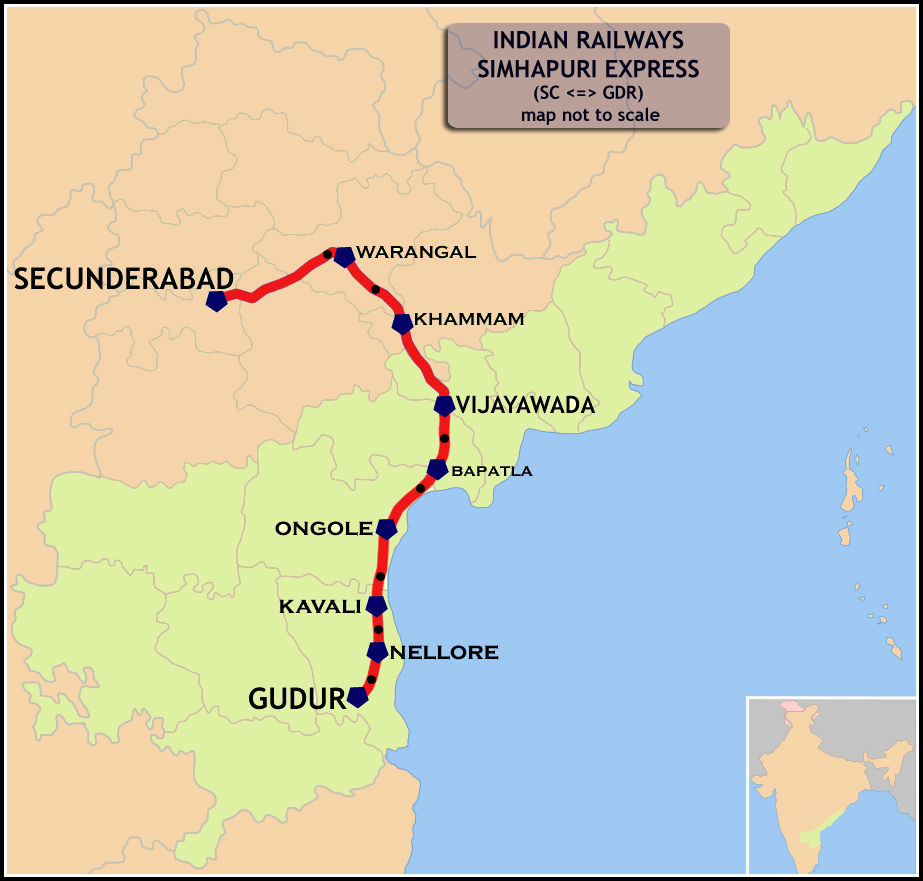

The 12709 / 12710 Simhapuri Express is an express train operated by South Central Railways of Indian Railways between Secunderabad and Gudur in Nellore district of Andhra Pradesh.

== Route and halts ==
The train runs from Secunderabad Junction via Kazipet Junction, Warangal, Khammam, Vijayawada Junction, Tenali Junction, Bapatla, Chirala, Ongole, Singarayakonda, Kavali, Bitragunta, Nellore, Vedayapalem Gudur Junction.

== Timetable ==
12710; Secunderabad Jn.-Gudur Jn.		Simhapuri Express timetable			12709; Gudur Jn.-Secunderabad Jn.	
Arrival	Departure	Station name	Station code	Distance (km)	Arrival	Departure
--:--	22:05	Secunderabad Jn	SC	0	05:45	--:--
23:53	23:55	Kazipet Jn	KZJ	131.7	02:33	02:35
00:18	00:20	Warangal	WL	141.9	02:13	02:15
01:09	01:10	Mahbubabad	MABD	202	01:19	01:20
01:49	01:50	Khammam	KMT	249.4	00:39	00:40
03:30	03:40	Vijayawada Jn	BZA	348.5	22:50	23:00
04:09	04:10	Tenali Jn	TEL	380	22:08	22:10
04:44	04:45	Bapatla	BPP	422.5	21:28	21:30
05:24	05:25	Chirala	CLX	437.6	21:13	21:15
06:08	06:10	Ongole	OGL	487	20:28	20:30
06:29	06:30	Singarayakonda	SKM	515.1	20:03	20:05
06:58	07:00	Kavali	KVZ	553	19:38	19:40
07:18	07:20	Bitragunta	BTTR	569.4	19:23	19:25
07:48	07:50	Nellore	NLR	603.7	18:58	19:00
07:58	08:00	Vedayapalem	VDE	611	18:48	18:50
08:55	--:--	Gudur Jn	GDR	642.1	--:--	18:40

== Rake sharing ==
The train shares its rake with 12704/12704 Falaknuma Express.

== Coach composition ==
The train consists of 22 LHB coaches:

- 1 AC First
- 2 AC Two Tier
- 6 AC Three Tiers Economy
- 6 Sleeper classes
- 1 Pantry car (remains Locked)
- 4 General (unreserved)
- 1 Generator
- 1 Seating (Disabled/Ladies) cum Luggage Rakes.

As is customary with most other train services in India, coach composition may be amended at the discretion of Indian Railways, depending on demand.

Loco	1	2	3	4	5	6	7	8	9	10	11	12	13	14	15	16	17	18	19	20	21	22
	EOG	GEN	GEN	H1	A1	A2	M1	M2	M3	M4	M5	M6	PC	S1	S2	S3	S4	S5	S6	GEN	GEN	SLR

== Traction ==
Both trains are hauled by a Lallaguda Loco Shed based WAP-7 electric locomotive from end to end.
