= Krishna Express =

Indian express train

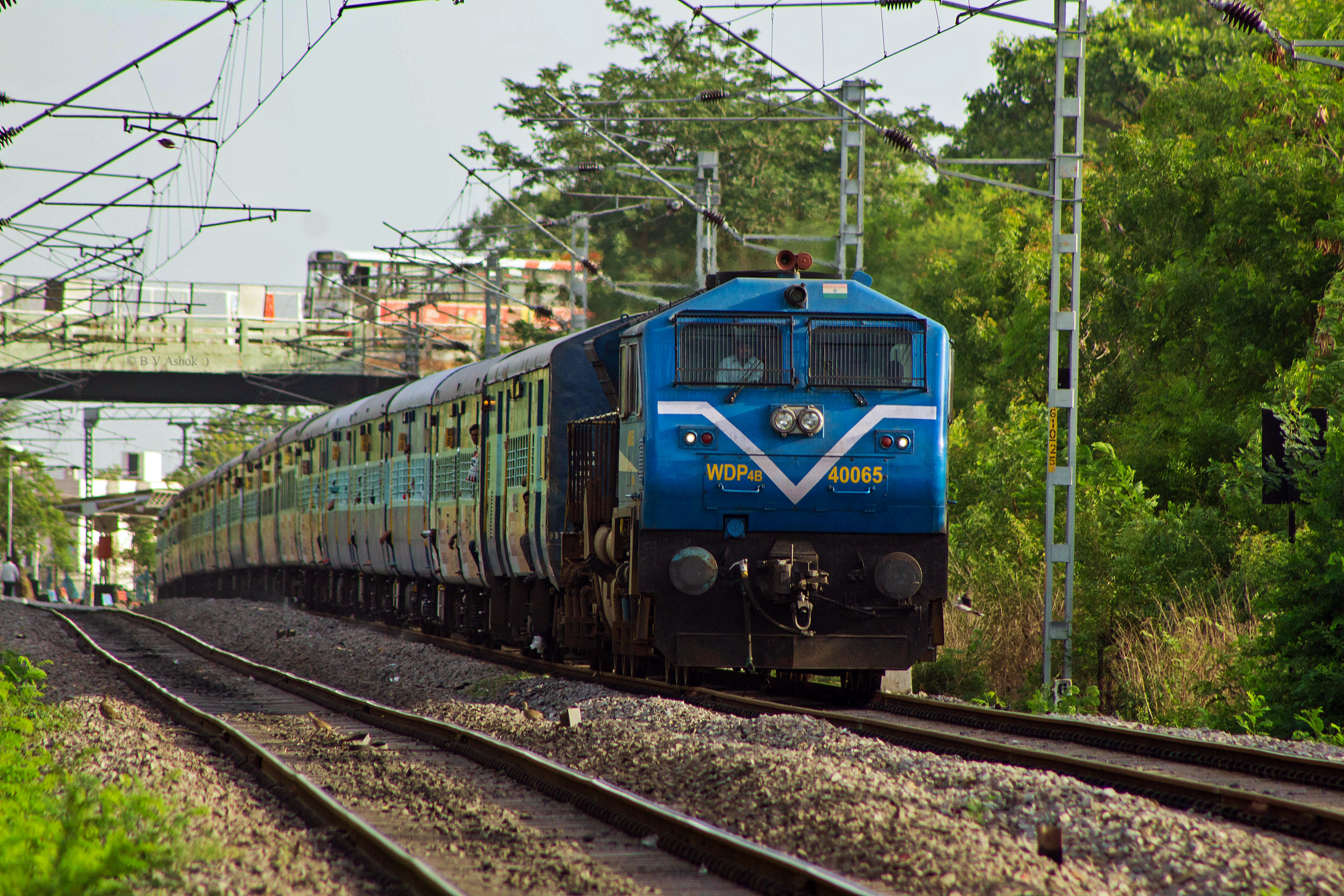
- Krishna Express with KJM WDP4B locomotive exiting Alwal

Overview
- Service type: Express
- Locale: Telangana, Maharashtra & Andhra Pradesh
- First service: 2 October 1974
- Current operator: South Coast Railways

Route
- Termini: Tirupati Main (TPTY); Adilabad (ADB)
- Stops: 60
- Distance travelled: 1,148 km (713 mi)
- Average journey time: 24 hrs 50 min
- Service frequency: Daily
- Train number: 17405/ 17406

On-board services
- Classes: Third AC (3-tier) Sleeper, AC Chair Car, Sleeper Class, Second Sitting, General Unreserved
- Seating arrangements: Yes
- Sleeping arrangements: Yes
- Catering facilities: On-board, E-catering
- Baggage facilities: Under seats

Technical
- Rolling stock: ICF coach
- Track gauge: 1,676 mm (5 ft 6 in) broad gauge
- Operating speed: 46 km/h Avg. Speed
Route map
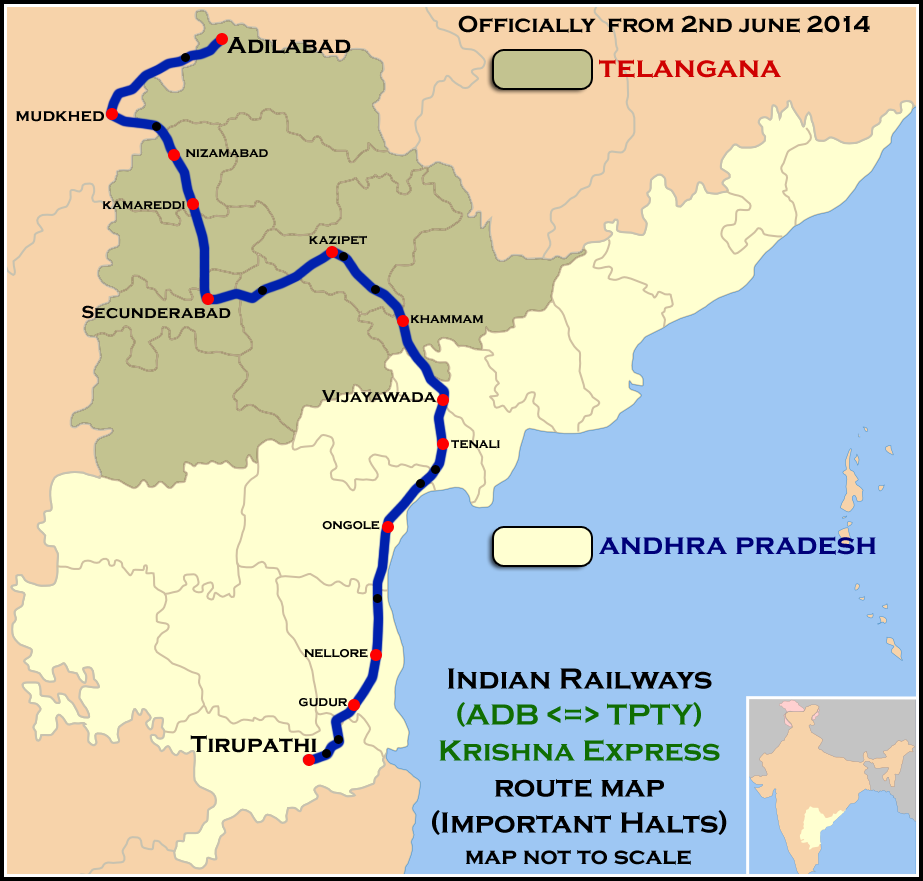

The 17405 / 17406 Krishna Express, is an intercity express train running between Tirupati Main of Andhra Pradesh and Adilabad of Telangana. It belongs to South Coast Railway zone and takes 24 hours and 50 minutes to cover 1,148 km (713 mi) between its nodal stations.

== Schedule ==
17405 Krishna Express starts from Tirupati at 5:45 a.m. and arrives at Adilabad on the next day 6:15 a.m. Similarly, 17406 Krishna Express starts from Adilabad at 21:05 and arrives at Tirupati on the next day at 21:40.

== Etymology ==
The train is named after the Krishna River which flows from the city of Vijayawada. Then, it was extended up to Hyderabad Decan, as an early morning Day Train. Later, it was extended up to Secunderabad and Nizamabad and now up to Adilabad. It was extended up to Tirupathi on the other side.

Krishna express is also known as Sree Krishna Express after this Indian God.

== Route and halts ==
This train runs from Adilabad via Mudkhed, Nizamabad, Malkajgiri, Secunderabad, Charlapalli,Kazipet Junction, Warangal, Khammam, Vijayawada, Tenali, Nidubrolu, Chirala, Ongole, Kavali,Bitragunta, Nellore, Gudur Junction, Renigunta Junction to Tirupati Main.

== Traction ==
It is hauled by an Electric Loco Shed, Lallaguda based WAG-9 / WAP-7 locomotive from ADB till SC, from SC to Tirupathi it is hauled by an Electric Loco Shed, Lallaguda based WAP-7 locomotive and vice versa.

== Direction reversal ==
This train reverses direction at Secunderabad Junction and Mudkhed Junction.

== Rake sharing ==
This train shares the rake with Adilabad–Hazur Sahib Nanded Express.
