= Kovur, Nellore district =

Kovur Kovuru
- village
- kovur
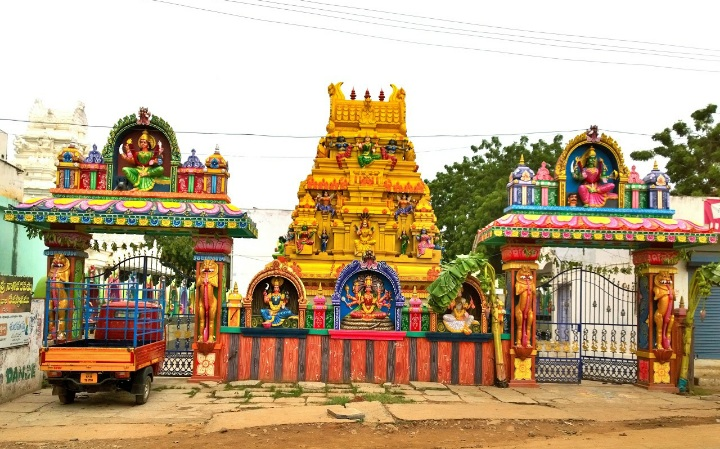
- Sri Nagavarapamma temple, Kovur

- Location of kovur in Andhra Pradesh, India
- Coordinates: 14.5001°N 79.9859°E
- Country: India
- State: Andhra Pradesh
- District: Nellore
- small town: Kovur

Government
  - Body: Nellore Urban Development Authority
  - Director: Kutla Uma (Telugu Desam party)
  - NUDA Chairman: Kotamreddy Sreenivasulu reddy

Area
  - village: 6.28 km^{2} (2.42 sq mi)
- Elevation: 19 m (62 ft)

Population (2011)
  - village: 32,082
  - Density: 5,110/km^{2} (13,200/sq mi)
  - Urban: 32,082

Languages
  - Official: Telugu
- Time zone: UTC+5:30 (IST)
- PIN: 524137
- Assembly constituency number: 225
- Vehicle registration: AP 26
- Website: Kovur Official website

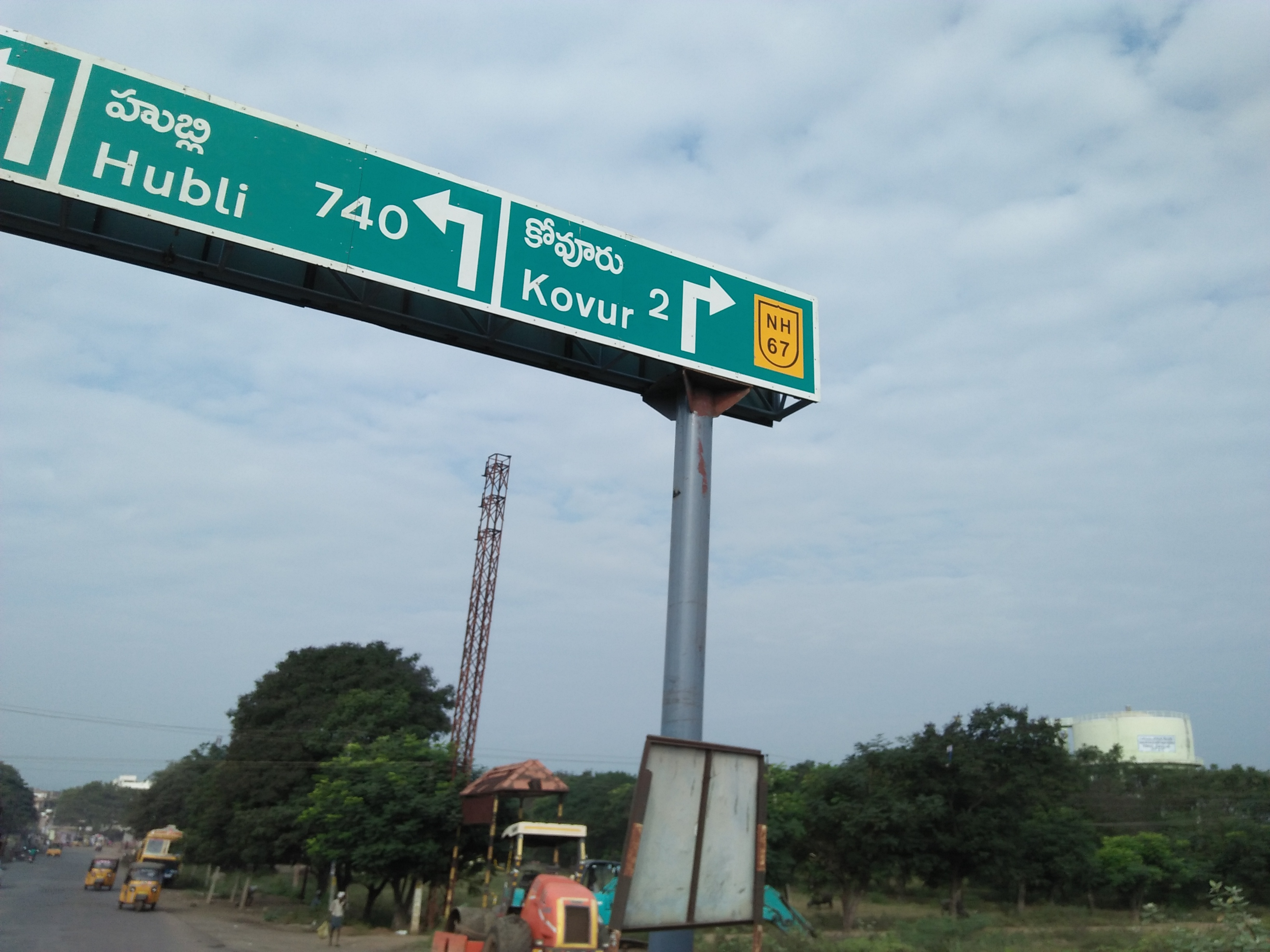
This is the image of kovur entrance at Saluchintal Center, Kovur at NH-67

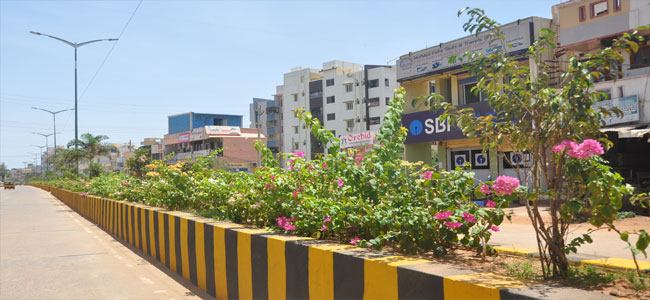
Kovur Trunk Road.

Kovur is a village in Nellore district of the Indian state of Andhra Pradesh. The village is also the headquarters of the Kovur Mandal and Assembly Constituency. It is located in Kovur mandal of Nellore revenue division. It forms a part of Nellore Urban Development Authority. The poet "Thikkanna" was born in this place.

== Geography ==
Kovur is located at 14.5001°N 79.9859°E and at an altitude of 19 m (62 ft). The village is spread over an area of 6.28 km^{2} (2.42 sq mi). Penna River is the major river flows in the proximity of the village.

== Demographics ==
As of 2011 census, Kovur had a population of 32,082. The total population constitute, 15,640 males and 16,442 females —a sex ratio of 1,051 females per 1,000 males. 3,196 children are in the age group of 0–6 years, of which 1,659 are boys and 1,537 are girls. The average literacy rate stands at 74.45% with 21,506 literates, significantly higher than the state average of 67.41%.

== Government and politics ==
Kovur gram panchayat is the local self-government of the village. The panchayat has a total of 20 wards with an elected ward member. The present sarpanch of the village is Kutla Uma and vice-sarpanch is Intha Malla Reddy. Kovur in Kovur mandal is represented by Kovur assembly constituency of Andhra Pradesh Legislative Assembly. The present MLA representing the constituency is Vemireddy Prashanthi Reddy of Telugu Desam Party. It forms a part in Nellore Urban Development Authority. The present chairman is Kotamreddy Sreenivasulu reddy.

== Economy ==
Paddy (unboiled rice) sugarcane is the major Agricultural crop produced. The L.Vannamei variety of Shrimp farming is the major Aquaculture production in and around Kovur.

== Transport ==
National Highway 16, a part of Golden Quadrilateral project, bypasses Kovur village. Padugupadu railway station provides rail connectivity and is situated on Vijayawada-Gudur section of Howrah-Chennai main line. It is administered under Vijayawada railway division of South Central Railway zone. National Highway 67 bypasses through Kovur village.

== Notable people ==
- Duvvuri Subbarao, Former IAS Officer who held various important positions in both state and union governments including Finance Secretary in Government of Andhra Pradesh, Finance Secretary of India and finally served as Governor of Reserve Bank of India from 2008 - 2013 before retiring from government service.

== Education ==
The primary and secondary school education is imparted by government, aided and private schools, under the School Education Department of the state. The total number of students enrolled in primary, upper primary and high schools of the village are 1,731. There are 15 schools which include, six private, eight Mandal Parishad and ZPHS, and other types of school as well.
