= Transport in Nellore =

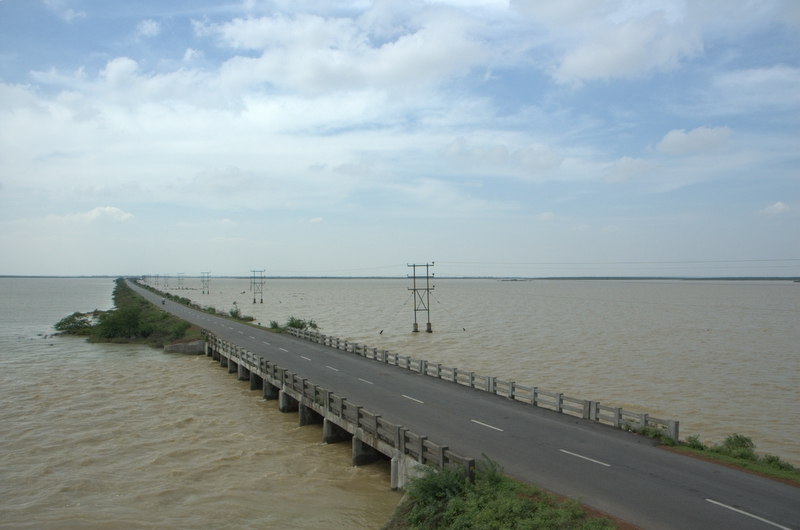
Road leading to Sri Hari Kota from Nellore

There are various modes of transportation available in Nellore and its region. It includes auto rickshaws, bicycles to mass transit systems - such as buses, trains and ships.

== Roadways ==
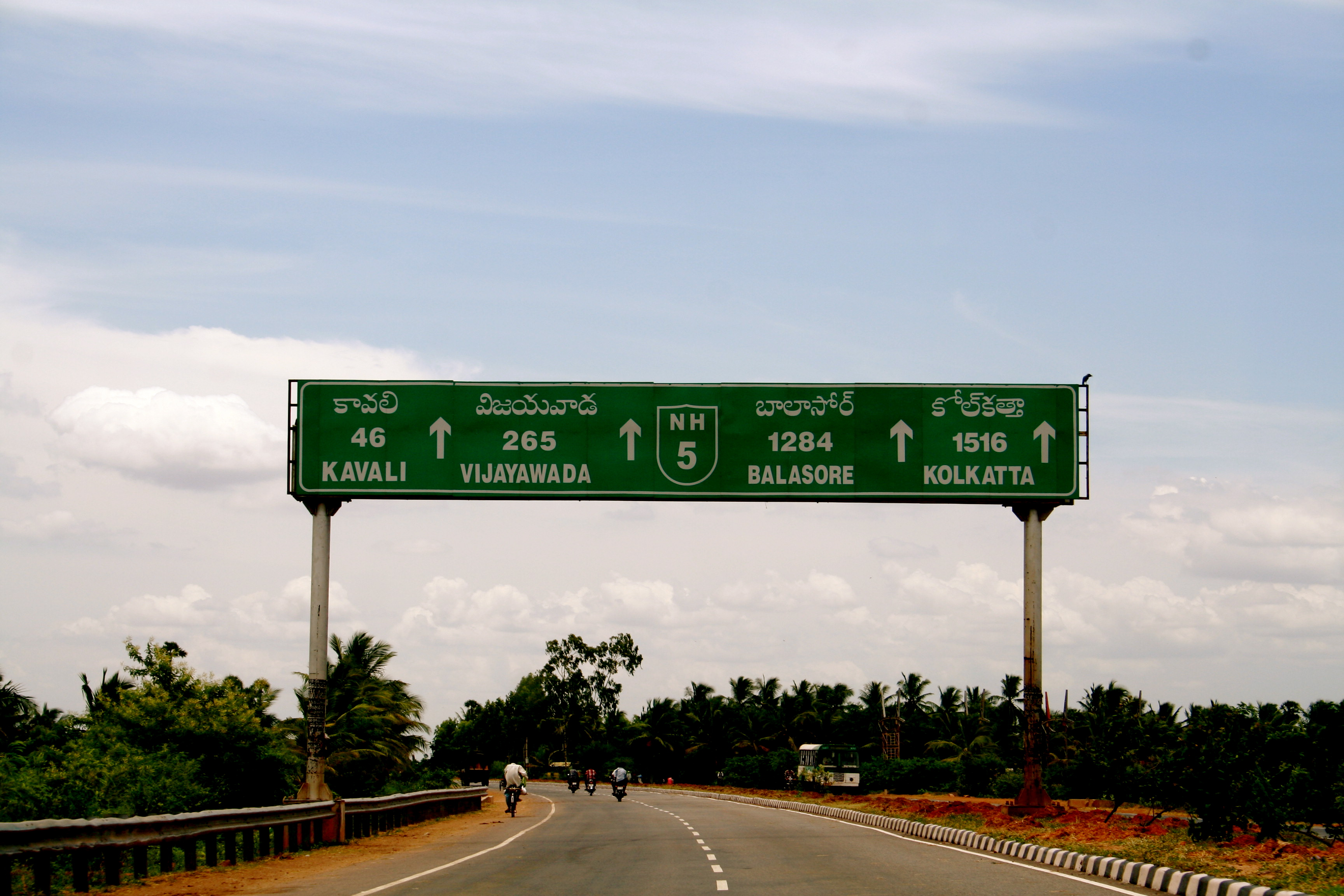
National Highway 5 at Nellore

The city has a total road length of 1,189.95 km (739.40 mi). The proposed Outer Ring Road, existing arterial and internal roads helps reduce traffic congestion. It was proposed to construct an ORR with 72 km length and a width of 200 feet. The city is connected with major National highways such as, National Highway 16, a part of Asian Highway 45 and Golden Quadrilateral, bypasses the city and is connected to Vijaywada (280 km), to Tirupati (124 km) and to Chennai (175 km) via National Highway (NH) 5, to Hyderabad (454 km) via AH 45, to Bangalore (385 km) via NH 4 . One NH, two bypass national highways and five State Highways passes through the city.

== Public Transport ==
Road Transport

Nellore bus station of the city operates district and long-distance services. Government is planning to demolish the present APSRTC bus stand and erect a new structure in couple of years, such that the new bus station will house commercial establishments, offices and multiplex and would generate internal revenues for RTC. Atmakur Bus station is metro bus station located in the city. Private owned auto rickshaws accounts to around 6,000, dominating most part of the city for local commuting.

Train Transit

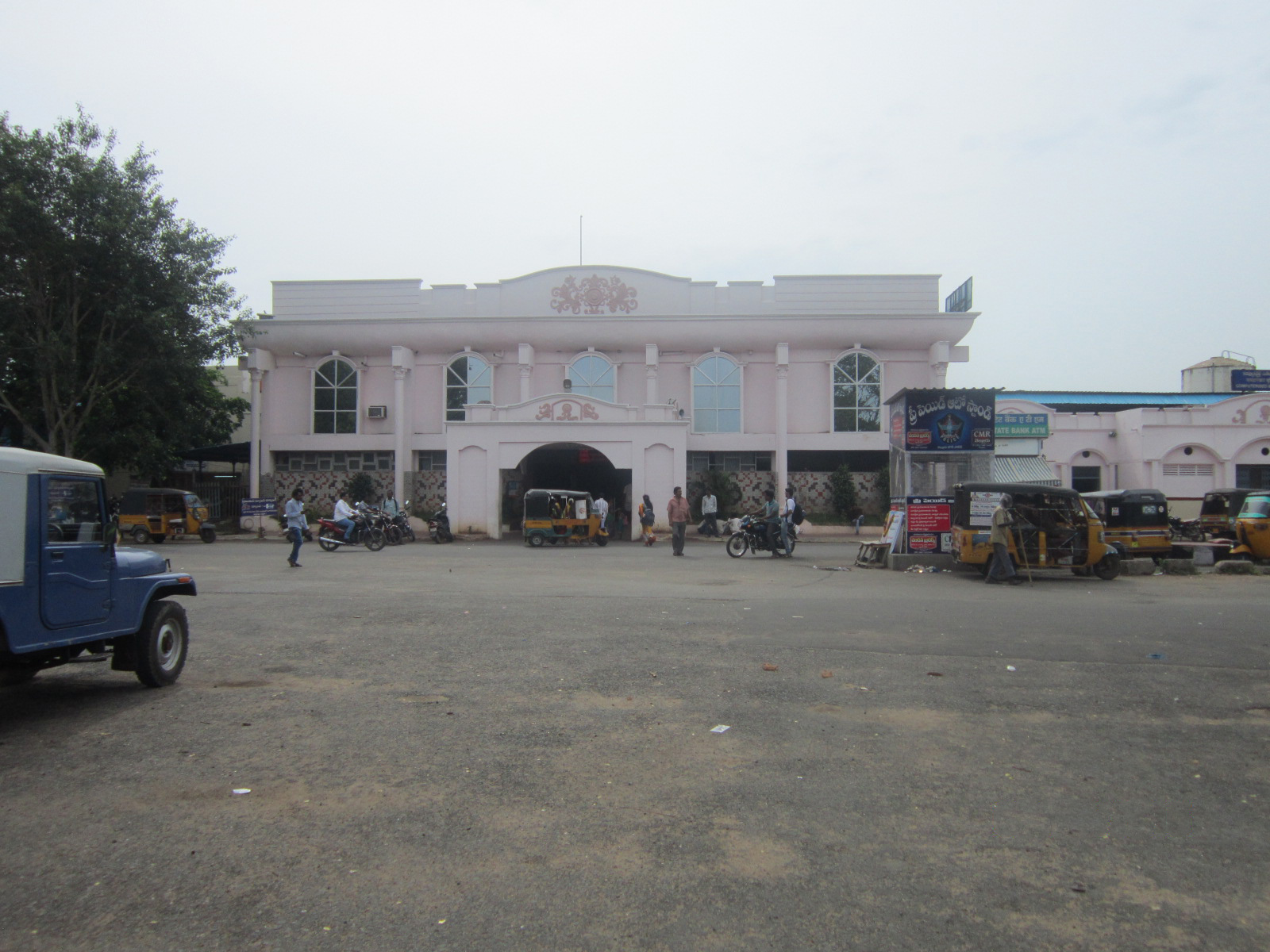
Nellore railway Station

Nellore is one of the fourteen ‘A’ category stations and one of the ten model stations in the Vijayawada Railway Division of South Central Railway Zone. Nellore railway station is having escalators on 4 platforms. SCR recently installed Automatic Ticket Vending Machines (ATVM)s in Nellore station. It is amongst the top hundred booking stations of Indian Railway. Other satellite stations include Nellore South (station code:NLS), Vedayapalem (station code:VDE). South Central Railway operates MEMUs between Nellore and Chennai.

Airways

There is also a proposal to build a no frills airport for the city. The district administration identified land of 3,408 acres under Damavaram, Dagadarthi, Velupodu and K.Kourugunta villages for the proposed airport in 2013 and subsequently the Airports Authority of India had expressed its interest for initial acquisition of 614 acres and the Government had accorded clearance in December 2015.
