= Ulavapadu railway station =

Railway station in Andhra Pradesh, India

Ulavapadu

General information
- Location: Ulavapadu, Prakasam district, Andhra Pradesh; India
- Coordinates: 16°14′33″N 80°38′24″E
- System: Commuter, Inter-city and Regional rail station
- Owner: Indian Railways
- Operator: Indian Railways
- Lines: Howrah–Chennai main line; New Delhi–Chennai main line; Vijayawada–Gudur section
- Platforms: 2

Construction
- Structure type: Standard (on ground)
- Accessible: Disabled access

Other information
- Station code: UPD
- Zone(s): SCoR
- Division(s): Vijayawada
- Classification: Non-Suburban Grade-6 (NSG-6)

History
- Opened: 1899
- Electrified: 1980–81

Services
Preceding station	Indian Railways	Following station
Singarayakonda towards ?	New Delhi–Chennai main line	Tettu towards ?
Singarayakonda towards ?	Howrah–Chennai main line	Tettu towards ?
Route map
Location
- Location within Andhra Pradesh Location within India
- Interactive map

Ulavapadu railway station (station code:UPD), is an Indian Railways station in Ulavapadu of Andhra Pradesh. It is situated on Vijayawada–Gudur section of Vijayawada railway division in South Coast Railway zone.

== Classification ==
In terms of earnings and outward passengers handled, Ulavapadu is categorized as a Non-Suburban Grade-6 (NSG-6) railway station. Based on the re–categorization of Indian Railway stations for the period of 2017–18 and 2022–23, an NSG–6 category station earns nearly ₹1 crore and handles close to 1 million passengers.
