= Venkatachalam railway station =

Railway station in Andhra Pradesh, India

Venkatachalam Junction Railway Station

General information
- Location: Venkatachalam, Nellore district, Andhra Pradesh; India
- Coordinates: 14.3264°N 79.9269°E
- Elevation: 26 m (85 ft)
- System: Indian Railways
- Lines: Vijayawada–Chennai section of Howrah–Chennai main line and Delhi–Chennai line and Venkatachalam-Krishnapatnam line
- Platforms: 3
- Tracks: 5 ft 6 in (1,676 mm) broad gauge

Construction
- Structure type: (Junction station)
- Parking: Available

Other information
- Status: Functioning
- Station code: VKT
- Zone(s): South Coast Railway zone,
- Division(s): Vijayawada

History
- Opened: 1899
- Electrified: 1980–81
Location
- Location within Andhra Pradesh Location within India
- Interactive map

Venkatachalam junction railway station (station code:VKT), located in the Indian state of Andhra Pradesh, serves Venkatachalam in Nellore district.

== History ==
The Vijayawada–Chennai link was established in 1899.

The Chirala–Elavur section was electrified in 1980–81.

== Classification ==
In terms of earnings and outward passengers handled, Venkatachalam is categorized as a Non-Suburban Grade-6 (NSG-6) railway station. Based on the re–categorization of Indian Railway stations for the period of 2017–18 and 2022–23, an NSG–6 category station earns nearly ₹1 crore and handles close to 1 million passengers.
