= Padugupadu railway station =

Railway station in Andhra Pradesh, India

Padugupadu
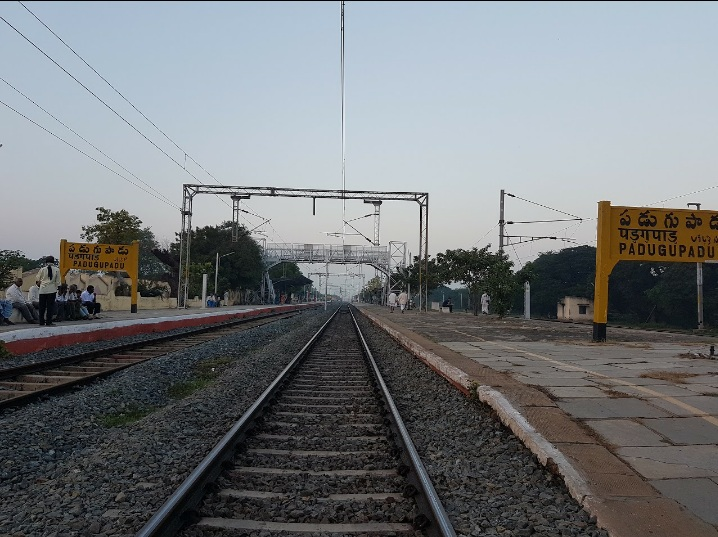
- Padugupadu railway station at Kovur

General information
- Location: Kovur, Nellore district, Andhra Pradesh; India
- Coordinates: 14.4980°N 79.9901°E
- Elevation: 21 m (69 ft)
- System: Indian Railways station
- Owner: Indian Railways
- Operator: South Coast Railways
- Lines: Vijayawada–Chennai section of Howrah–Chennai main line and Delhi–Chennai line
- Platforms: 3
- Tracks: 7 5 ft 6 in (1,676 mm) broad gauge

Construction
- Structure type: Standard (on ground station)
- Parking: Available

Other information
- Status: Functioning
- Station code: PGU
- Zone(s): SCoR
- Division(s): Vijayawada

History
- Opened: 1899; 127 years ago
- Rebuilt: 2020
- Electrified: 1980–81
Location
- Location within Andhra Pradesh Location within India
- Interactive map

Padugupadu railway station (station code:PGU), located in the Indian state of Andhra Pradesh, serves Kovur City in Nellore district. It has 3 platforms with shelter and drinking water facility is also now available. 2 Express trains are halting here.

== History ==
The Vijayawada–Chennai link was established in 1899.

The Chirala–Elavur section was electrified in 1980–81.

== Classification ==
In terms of earnings and outward passengers handled, Padugupadu is categorized as a Non-Suburban Grade-6 (NSG-6) railway station. Based on the re–categorization of Indian Railway stations for the period of 2017–18 and 2022–23, an NSG–6 category station earns nearly ₹1 crore and handles close to 1 million passengers.
