= Gunadala railway station =

Railway station in Andhra Pradesh

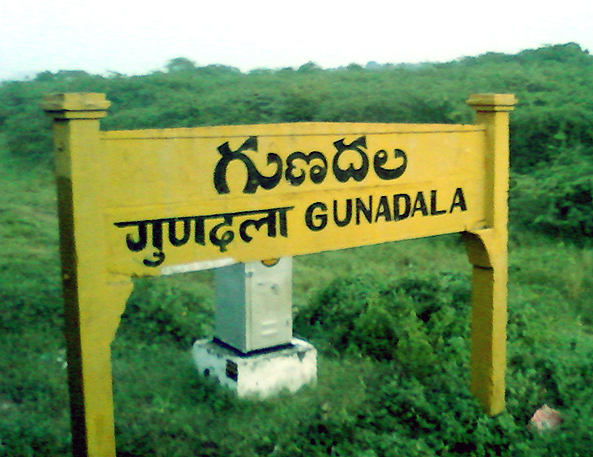
- Gunadala railway station signboard

General information
- Location: Gunadala, Vijayawada, Andhra Pradesh; India
- Coordinates: 16°32′17″N 80°40′23″E
- System: Indian Railways station
- Owner: Indian Railways
- Lines: Howrah–Chennai main line Vijayawada–Visakhapatnam line
- Platforms: 2

Construction
- Structure type: Standard (on ground station)

Other information
- Status: Active
- Station code: GALA
- Zone(s): South Coast Railway zone
- Division(s): Vijayawada
- Fare zone: South Coast Railway
Location
- Location within Andhra Pradesh Location within India
- Interactive map

Gunadala railway station (station code:GALA) is an Indian Railways station in the Gunadala neighbourhood of Vijayawada, and a satellite station of Vijayawada in Andhra Pradesh. It is situated on Vijayawada - Rajahmundry section of Howrah–Chennai main line and is administered by Vijayawada railway division of South Coast Railway zone. It is an important station alongside Ramavarappadu, for devotees during the annual Mary Matha festival, celebrated at Gunadala Matha Shrine in the city. It is one of the 27 rural stations in the state to have Wi-Fi.

== Classification ==
In terms of earnings and outward passengers handled, Gunadala is categorized as a Non-Suburban Grade-6 (NSG-6) railway station. Based on the re–categorization of Indian Railway stations for the period of 2017–18 and 2022–23, an NSG–6 category station earns nearly ₹1 crore and handles close to 1 million passengers.
