= Bapatla railway station =

Railway station in Andhra Pradesh, India

General information
- Location: Government Hospital Road, Bapatla, Bapatla district, Andhra Pradesh; India
- Coordinates: 15.9065°N 80.4684°E
- Operator: Indian Railways
- Line: Vijayawada–Gudur section
- Platforms: 5

Construction
- Structure type: Standard (on-ground station)
- Accessible: Disabled access

Other information
- Status: Active
- Station code: BPP
- Zone(s): South Coast Railway zone
- Division(s): Vijayawada

Services
Preceding station	Indian Railways	Following station
Appikatla towards ?	Howrah–Chennai main line Vijayawada–Gudur section	Stuartpuram towards ?
Location
- Location within Andhra Pradesh Location within India
- Interactive map

Bapatla railway station (station code:BPP) is an Indian Railways station in Bapatla of Andhra Pradesh. It lies on the Vijayawada–Gudur section and is administered under Vijayawada railway division of South Coast Railway zone.

== History ==
The Vijayawada–Chennai link was established in 1899. The Chirala–Elavur section was electrified in 1980–81.

== Classification ==
In terms of earnings and outward passengers handled, Bapatla is categorized as a Non-Suburban Grade-5 (NSG-5) railway station. Based on the re–categorization of Indian Railway stations for the period of 2017–18 and 2022–23, an NSG–5 category station earns between ₹1–₹10 crore and handles 1–2 million passengers.

== Station amenities ==
Bapatla is one of the 38 stations in the division to be equipped with Automatic Ticket Vending Machines (ATVMs).
