= Kavali railway station =

Railway station in Andhra Pradesh, India

Kavali
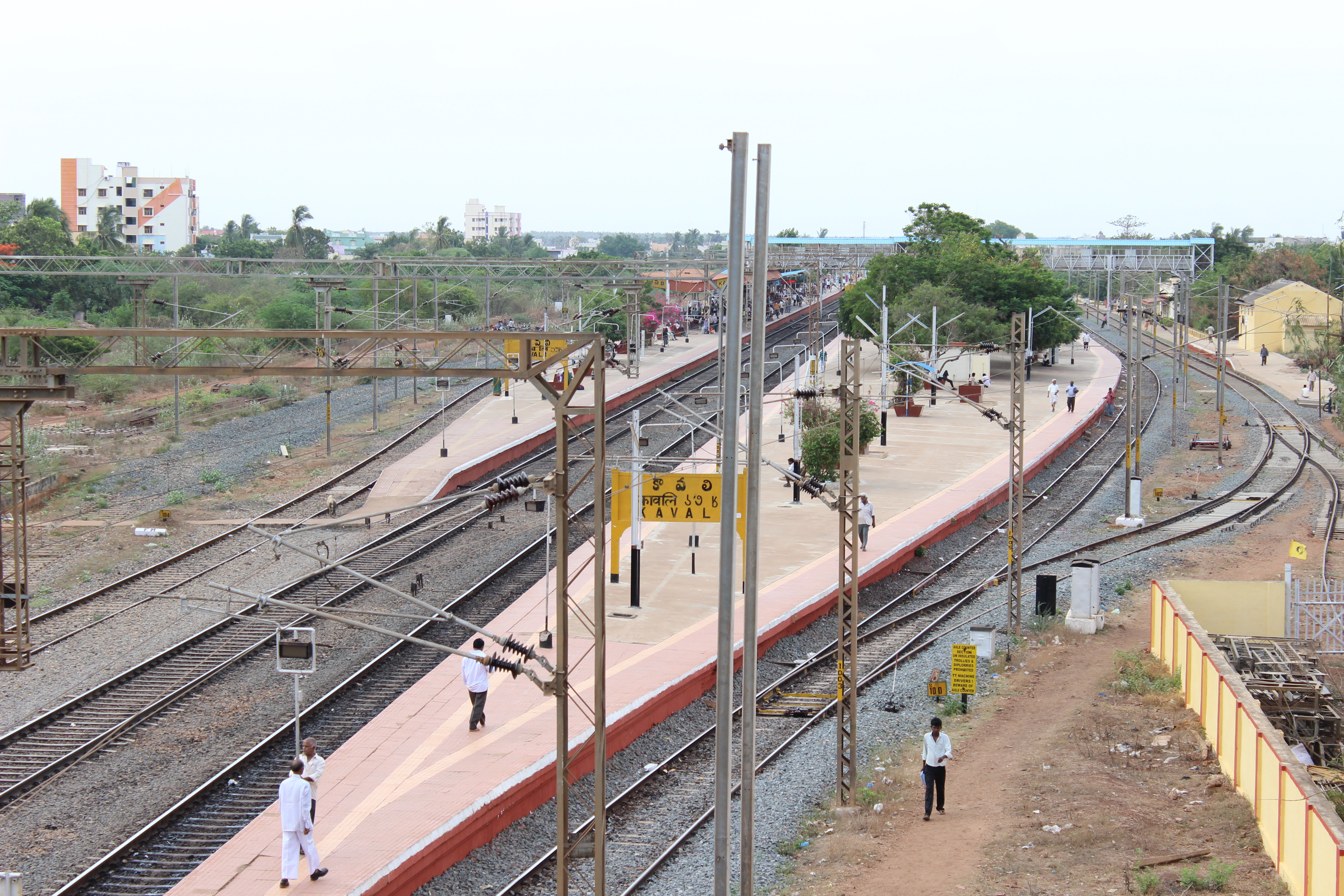
- Remote view of Kavali railway station

General information
- Location: Railway Station Road, Kavali, Nellore district, Andhra Pradesh; India
- Coordinates: 14°55′12″N 79°58′48″E
- Elevation: 21 metres (69 ft)
- System: Indian Railways station
- Owner: Indian Railways
- Operator: South Central Railways
- Lines: Vijayawada–Chennai section of Howrah–Chennai main line and Delhi–Chennai line
- Platforms: 5
- Tracks: 5 5 ft 6 in (1,676 mm) broad gauge

Construction
- Structure type: Standard (on ground station)
- Parking: Available

Other information
- Status: Functioning
- Station code: KVZ
- Zone(s): South Central Railway zone
- Division(s): Vijayawada

History
- Electrified: 1980–81
Location
- Location within Andhra Pradesh

Kavali railway station (station code: KVZ), located in the Indian state of Andhra Pradesh, serves Kavali in SPSR Nellore Dist. It is administered under Vijayawada railway division of South Central Railway zone.

== History ==
The Vijayawada–Chennai link was established in 1899.

The Chirala–Elavur section was electrified in 1980–81.

== Classification ==
In terms of earnings and outward passengers handled, Kavali is categorized as a Non-Suburban Grade-4 (NSG-4) railway station. Based on the re–categorization of Indian Railway stations for the period of 2017–18 and 2022–23, an NSG–4 category station earns between ₹10–₹20 crore and handles 2–5 million passengers.

== Station amenities ==
Kavali is one of the 38 stations in the division to be equipped with Automatic Ticket Vending Machines (ATVMs).
