= Makudi railway station =

Railway Station in Maharashtra, India

General information
- Location: Antargaon, Chandrapur district, Maharashtra; India
- Coordinates: 19.54°N 79.48°E
- Elevation: 188 metres (617 ft)
- System: Indian Railways station
- Owner: Indian Railways
- Line: Delhi–Chennai line
- Platforms: 2
- Tracks: 2

Construction
- Structure type: Standard (on ground station)
- Parking: Yes
- Cycle facilities: No

Other information
- Status: Functioning
- Station code: MKDI
- Fare zone: Central
Location
- Location within Maharashtra Location within India

Makudi railway station (station code: MKDI) is a railway station on New Delhi–Chennai main line in Secunderabad railway division of South Central Railway zone of Indian Railways. It is located in Antargaon, a village in Chandrapur district in Maharashtra state in India. It serves Makidi, a village located 6 km away in Asifabad district in Telangana state in India. The railway station is located at 180 m above sea level and has two platforms. Only passenger trains stop at this station. It is the last railway station in Maharashtra before crossing over to Telangana.
