= Nellore South railway station =

Railway station in Andhra Pradesh, India

Nellore South

General information
- Location: VRC centre, Nellore, Nellore district, Andhra Pradesh; India
- Coordinates: 14.4447°N 79.9837°E
- Elevation: 22 m (72 ft)
- System: Indian Railways and Chennai Suburban Railway station
- Lines: Vijayawada–Chennai section of Howrah–Chennai main line and Delhi–Chennai line
- Platforms: 2
- Tracks: 5 ft 6 in (1,676 mm) broad gauge

Construction
- Structure type: Standard (on-ground station)
- Parking: Available

Other information
- Status: Functioning
- Station code: NLS
- Zone(s): South Central Railway,
- Division(s): Vijayawada

History
- Opened: 1899
- Electrified: 1980–81
Location
- Location within Andhra Pradesh Location within India
- Interactive map

Nellore South railway station (station code:NLS), located in the Indian state of Andhra Pradesh, serves Nellore in Nellore district.

== History ==
The Vijayawada–Chennai link was established in 1899.

The Chirala–Elavur section was electrified in 1980–81.

== Classification ==
In terms of earnings and outward passengers handled, Nellore South is categorized as a Halt Grade-1 (HG-1) railway station. Based on the re–categorization of Indian Railway stations for the period of 2017–18 and 2022–23, an HG–1 category station earns nearly ₹50 lakh and handles close to 3 lakh passengers.
