= Vedayapalem railway station =

Railway station in Andhra Pradesh, India

General information
- Location: Vedayapalem, Nellore, Nellore district, Andhra Pradesh; India
- Coordinates: 14.4055°N 79.9576°E
- Elevation: 27 m (89 ft)
- System: Indian Railways
- Lines: Vijayawada–Chennai section of Howrah–Chennai main line and Delhi–Chennai line
- Platforms: 2
- Tracks: 4

Construction
- Structure type: Standard (on-ground station)
- Parking: Available

Other information
- Status: Functioning
- Station code: VDE
- Zone(s): South Central Railway,
- Division(s): Vijayawada

History
- Opened: 1899
- Electrified: 1980–81
Location
- Location within Andhra Pradesh Location within India
- Interactive map

Vedayapalem railway station (station code:VDE), located in the Indian state of Andhra Pradesh, serves Nellore in Nellore district.

== History ==
The Vijayawada–Chennai link was established in 1899.

The Chirala–Elavur section was electrified in 1980–81.

== Classification ==
In terms of earnings and outward passengers handled, Vedayapalem is categorized as a Non-Suburban Grade-5 (NSG-5) railway station. Based on the re–categorization of Indian Railway stations for the period of 2017–18 and 2022–23, an NSG–5 category station earns between ₹1–₹10 crore and handles 1–2 million passengers.

== Station amenities ==
It is one of the 38 stations in the division to be equipped with Automatic Ticket Vending Machines (ATVMs).
