= Howrah–Chennai Mail =

Train in India

Overview
- Service type: Mail
- Locale: West Bengal, Orissa, Andhra Pradesh, Tamil Nadu
- First service: 15 August 1900; 126 years ago
- Current operator: South Eastern Railway zone

Route
- Termini: Howrah Junction; Chennai Central
- Distance travelled: 1,664 km (1,034 mi)
- Average journey time: 27 hours Approx.
- Service frequency: Daily
- Train number: 12839 / 12840

On-board services
- Classes: AC First, AC 2 Tier, AC 3 Tier, Sleeper Class, General Unreserved
- Seating arrangements: Yes
- Sleeping arrangements: Yes
- Catering facilities: Yes
- Observation facilities: Large windows
- Baggage facilities: Yes

Technical
- Rolling stock: LHB coach
- Track gauge: 1,676 mm (5 ft 6 in)
- Operating speed: 59 km/h (37 mph) average with halts
Route map
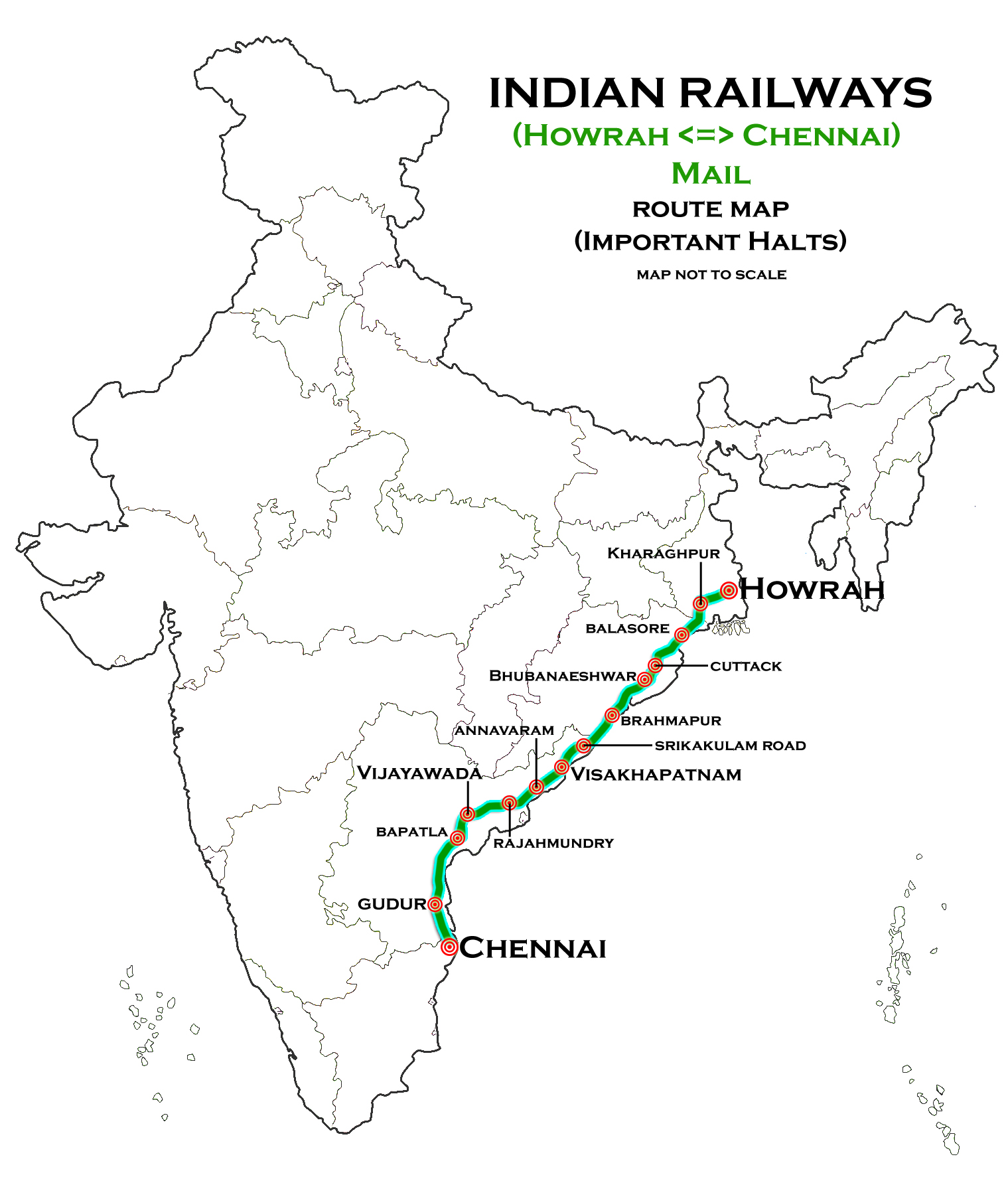

The 12839 / 12840 Howrah-Chennai Mail is a mail train of Indian Railways connecting Howrah Junction and Chennai Central. It connects three metropolitan cities of India, Kolkata, Chennai and Visakhapatnam. It also runs via some major cities of India like Bhubaneswar, Vijayawada, etc.

The second-most preferred train to the south after Coromandel Express'.'

== History ==
The train made its inaugural run on August 15, 1900, which makes it one of the oldest running trains on Indian railways. It was first hauled by steam engines, including the WP class engines, then by diesel, and now by electric WAP-4 or WAP-7 locomotives. It was the first passenger train to be dieselized on the South Eastern Railway in 1964–65. Till the introduction of the Coromandel Express in the mid-seventies, it was the main and fastest train link between Howrah and Chennai (then Madras), with much fewer halts.

The train is the second most important train on the Howrah–Chennai main line after the high speed Coromandel Express. It covers 1,664 km (1,034 mi) at an average speed of 59 km/h (37 mph)

== Rakes ==
- 1 AC First Class (H1)
- 2 AC Two Tier (2A, A1-2)
- 4 AC Three Tier (3A, B1-8)
- 2 AC Three Tier Economy (3E, M1-2)
- 6 Sleeper class (S1-3)
- 1 Pantry car (PC)
- 4 General Unreserved (GS)
- 1 End on Generation car (EOG)
- 1 Sitting luggage cum brake van (SLR)

Loco	1	2	3	4	5	6	7	8	9	10	11	12	13	14	15	16	17	18	19	20	21	22
	SLR	GS	GS	S1	S2	S3	S4	S5	S6	PC	M1	M2	B1	B2	B3	B4	A1	A2	H1	GS	GS	EOG

== Route ==
Important stations through which it passes are Kharagpur Junction, Balasore, Cuttack Junction, Bhubaneswar, Khurda Road Junction, Berhampur, Naupada, Srikakulam Road railway station , Vizianagaram Jn, Visakhapatnam, Samalkot Junction, Rajahmundry, Eluru, Vijayawada Junction, Tenali Junction, Nellore, Gudur Junction.

== Loco Link ==
it was either hauled by WAP-4 or WAP-7 end to end since the route was fully electrified
