= Singarayakonda railway station =

Railway station in Andhra Pradesh

Singarayakonda

General information
- Location: Railway Station Road, Venkaiah Swamy Nagar, Singarayakonda, Andhra Pradesh; India
- Coordinates: 15°29′52″N 80°03′24″E
- Elevation: 12 m (39 ft)
- System: Indian Railways station
- Lines: Vijayawada–Chennai section of Howrah–Chennai main line and Delhi–Chennai line
- Platforms: 2
- Tracks: 2 5 ft 6 in (1,676 mm) broad gauge

Construction
- Structure type: Standard (on ground station)
- Parking: Available

Other information
- Status: Functioning
- Station code: SKM
- Zone(s): South Coast Railway
- Division(s): Vijayawada

History
- Opened: 1899; 127 years ago
- Electrified: 1980–81
Location
- Location within Andhra Pradesh Location within India

Singarayakonda railway station (station code:SKM), provides rail connectivity to Singarayakonda in Prakasam district of the Indian state of Andhra Pradesh. It is administered under Vijayawada railway division of South Coast Railway zone.

== Classification ==
In terms of earnings and outward passengers handled, Singarayakonda is categorized as a Non-Suburban Grade-5 (NSG-5) railway station. Based on the re–categorization of Indian Railway stations for the period of 2017–18 and 2022–23, an NSG–5 category station earns between ₹1–₹10 crore and handles 1–2 million passengers.

Preceding station	Indian Railways	Following station
Karavadi towards ?	South Central Railway zone Vijayawada–Chennai section of Howrah–Chennai main line	Surareddipalem towards ?
