= Bitragunta railway station =

Railway station in Andhra Pradesh, India

Bitragunta Railway station
- Bitragunta Railway station

General information
- Location: Bitragunta – Tallure Rd, Bitragunta, Andhra Pradesh; India
- Coordinates: 14°46′00″N 79°59′00″E
- Elevation: 15 m (49 ft)
- System: Indian Railways station
- Owner: Indian Railways
- Operator: South Coast Railway zone
- Line: Vijayawada–Chennai section
- Platforms: 3
- Tracks: 10

Construction
- Structure type: Standard (on-ground station)
- Parking: Yes

Other information
- Station code: BTTR
- Zone(s): South Central Railway zone
- Division(s): Vijayawada
- Fare zone: Indian Railways

Services
Preceding station	Indian Railways	Following station
Sri Venkateswarapalem towards ?	South Coast Railway zone Vijayawada–Chennai section of Howrah–Chennai main line	Alluru Road towards ?
Location
- Location within Andhra Pradesh Location within India
- Interactive map

Bitragunta railway station (station code:BTTR) is an Indian Railways station located at Bitragunta town of Nellore district, in the Indian state of Andhra Pradesh. It is under the administration of Vijayawada railway division of South Central Railway zone.

== History ==
In 1968, the classification yard was established and later a wagon-repair depot, which was in operation till 1998. There was also Bitragunta Railway Institute (formerly Western Culture Institute).

== Classification ==
In terms of earnings and outward passengers handled, Bitragunta is categorized as a Non-Suburban Grade-5 (NSG-5) railway station. Based on the re–categorization of Indian Railway stations for the period of 2017–18 and 2022–23, an NSG–5 category station earns between ₹1–₹10 crore and handles 1–2 million passengers.
