= Falaknuma Express =

Train in India

Falaknuma Superfast Express
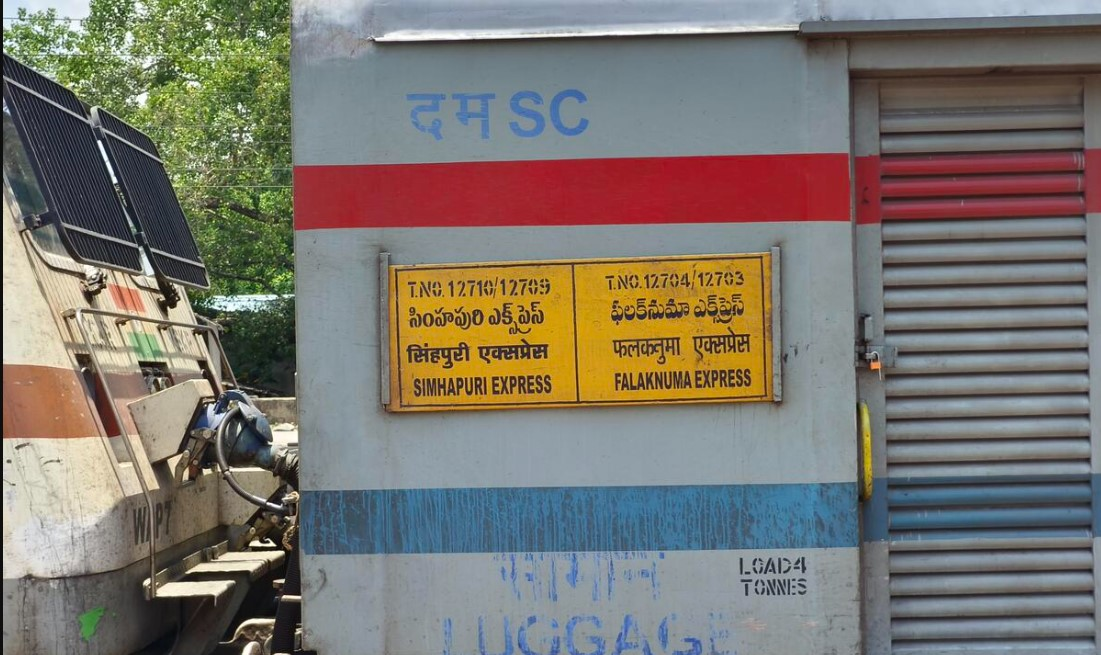
- Falaknuma Express Train Board

Overview
- Service type: Superfast Express
- Status: Daily Service
- First service: 15 October 1993; 33 years ago
- Current operator: South Central Railways

Route
- Termini: Secunderabad (SC); Howrah (HWH)
- Stops: 24
- Distance travelled: 1,544 km (959 mi)
- Average journey time: 25 hours 45 minutes
- Service frequency: Daily
- Train number: 12703 / 12704

On-board services
- Classes: AC First, AC 2 Tier, 3 AC Economy, Sleeper class, General Unreserved
- Seating arrangements: Yes
- Sleeping arrangements: Yes
- Catering facilities: Available
- Observation facilities: Rake sharing with 12709/12710 Simhapuri Express
- Baggage facilities: Below the seats

Technical
- Rolling stock: LHB coach
- Track gauge: 1,676 mm (5 ft 6 in) broad gauge
- Operating speed: 130 km/h (81 mph) maximum, 60 km/h (37 mph) average with halts
Route map
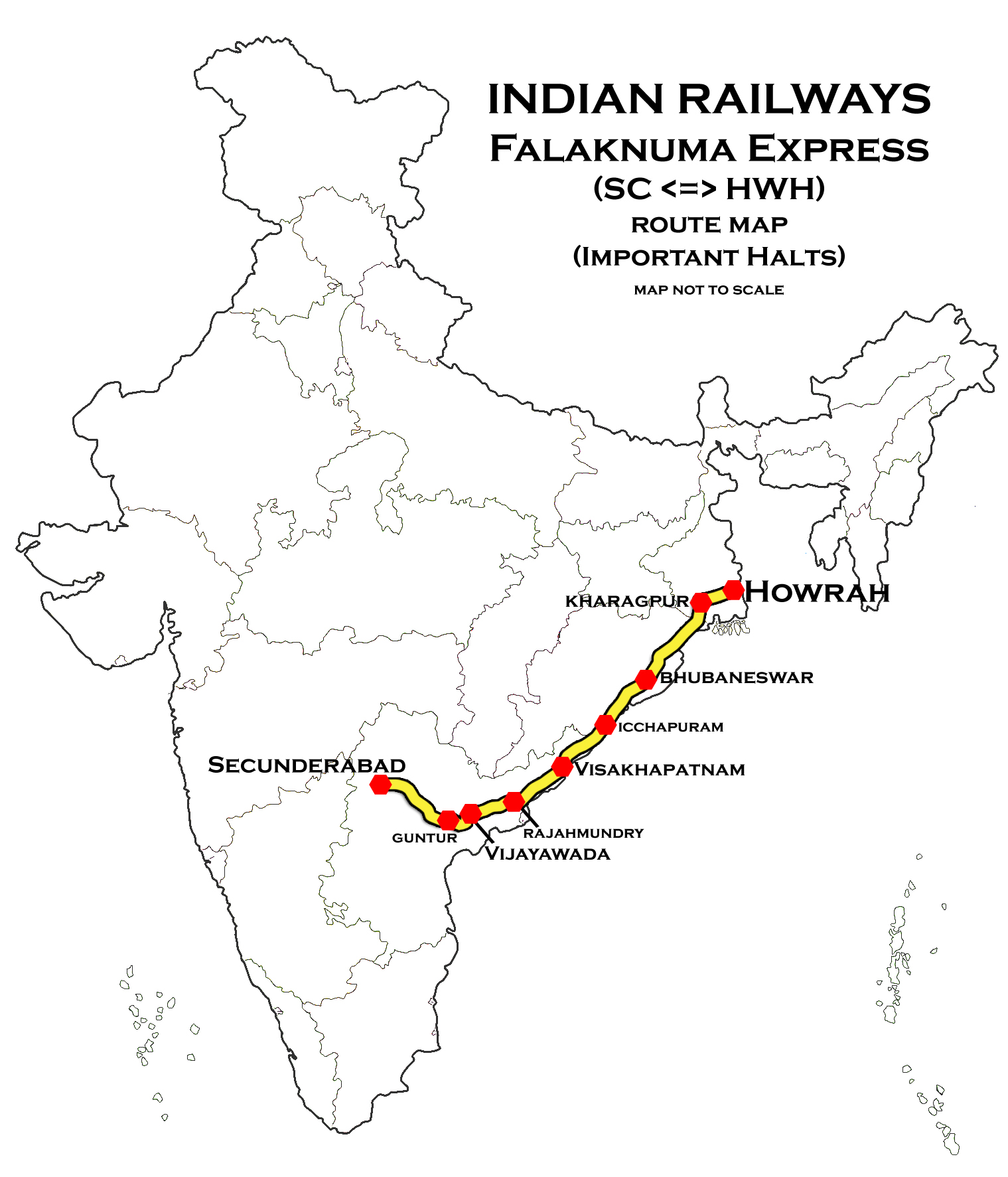

The 12703 / 12704 Falaknuma S. F Express is a Daily Superfast Express train belonging to South Central Railway zone that runs between Secunderabad and Howrah, (Kolkata) in India. It is currently being operated with 12703/12704 train numbers on daily basis. It is The Most Busiest and Most Crowded Daily Superfast Express Train On Hyderabad -Kolkata Route

== Overview ==
The train is named after the world-famous Falaknuma Palace in Hyderabad. "Falaknuma" is a Persian word (Persian—فلک ا نمایش), which means "Reflections of Sky/Heaven".

It runs daily and connects important stations such as Nalgonda, Miryalguda, Guntur Junction, Vijayawada Junction, Eluru, Rajahmundry, Visakhapatnam, Vizianagaram, Brahmapur, Bhubaneswar, Baleshwar and Kharagpur. It is a fast alternative to other trains such as East Coast Express, Guwahati–Secunderabad Express, Shalimar–Secunderabad AC Superfast Express and Shalimar–Secunderabad Superfast Express. Compared to the other trains from Secunderabad to Kolkata, it covers lesser distance as it runs via the Nalgonda, Guntur Junction route. It is the fastest Superfast Express between Secunderabad and Visakhapatnam other than Visakhapatnam–Secunderabad Duronto Express & Visakhapatnam–Secunderabad Garib Rath Express. The train runs jampacked throughout the year because people prefer this train as it has lesser halts than other trains on this route. The train is one of the worst maintained with many cleanliness issues and often runs with very huge delays.

The 12703/Howrah–Secunderabad Falaknuma Express has an average speed of 59 km/h and covers 1544 km in 26h 10m. The 12704/Secunderabad–Howrah Falaknuma Express, with the same average speed, covers the same distance in 26h 10m.

== Timings ==
The train departs from Platform #21 of Howrah Junction at 08:35 IST and arrives in Platform #9 of Secunderabad Junction at 10:10 IST, the next day. From Platform #2 of Secunderabad, the train departs at 15:55 IST and arrives in Platform #20 of Howrah at 17:45 IST, the next day.

== Route and halts ==
The train runs from Secunderabad via Nalgonda, Miryalguda, Piduguralla, Guntur Junction, Vijayawada Junction, Eluru, Tadepalligudem, Rajahmundry, Samalkot Junction, Visakhapatnam, Vizianagaram Junction, Srikakulam Road, Palasa, Brahmapur, Khurda Road Junction, Bhubaneswar, Cuttack Junction, Bhadrak, Balasore, Kharagpur Junction to Howrah.

== Classes ==
The train usually consists of a massive load of 23 standard LHB Coaches:

- 1 AC First
- 2 AC Two Tier
- 6 AC Three Tiers Economy
- 6 Sleeper classes
- 1 Pantry car
- 4 General (unreserved)
- 1 Generator
- 1 Seating (Disabled/Ladies) cum Luggage Rakes
- 1 High Capacity Parcel Van(HCPV)

As is customary with most other train services in India, coach composition may be amended at the discretion of Indian Railways, depending on demand.

== Coach composition ==
The train usually consists of a massive load of 23 standard LHB Coaches;

- 1 AC First
- 2 AC Two Tier
- 6 AC Three Tiers Economy
- 6 Sleeper classes
- 1 Pantry car
- 4 General (unreserved)
- 1 Generator
- 1 Seating (Disabled/Ladies) cum Luggage Rakes
- 1 High Capacity Parcel Van (HCPV)

As is customary with most other train services in India, coach composition may be amended at the discretion of Indian Railways, depending on demand.

Loco	1	2	3	4	5	6	7	8	9	10	11	12	13	14	15	16	17	18	19	20	21	22
	EOG	GEN	GEN	H1	A1	A2	M1	M2	M3	M4	M5	M6	PC	S1	S2	S3	S4	S5	S6	GEN	GEN	SLR

== Loco link ==
- A Lallaguda-based WAP-7 electric locomotive pulls it from Secunderabad to Visakhapatnam.
- The train reverses direction at Vishakhapatnam and gets a Santragachi or Howrah-based WAP-7 electric locomotive for the rest way up to Howrah.

== Rake sharing ==
- From 15th Dec 2023 - Present shares its rake with 12709/12710 Simhapuri Express.
- From 1st Jan 2018 till 14th Dec 2023 it shared its rakes with 17063/17064 Ajanta Express.
- The 12703/12704 Falaknuma Express previously used to share its rakes with 12733/12734 Narayanadri Express till 2017.

== Accident and incident ==
1.On October 16, 2013, the link between the train bogies and the engine broke at Mangalagiri in Guntur district of Andhra Pradesh.

2.on 26 March 2022,3 bogies separated from the train while running. The engine separated from the bogies.

3.on 8 July 2023, while coming to Secunderabad at 10:20 in the morning, a fire broke out in S4 coach.
