= Kotipalli railway station =

Railway station in Andhra Pradesh, India

Kotipalli

General information
- Location: Kotipalli, Konaseema dist., Andhra Pradesh; India
- Coordinates: 16°42′36″N 82°02′38″E
- Elevation: 14 m (46 ft)
- System: Indian Railways station
- Line: Kakinada–Kotipally branch line
- Platforms: 1 (at ground level)
- Tracks: 5 ft 6 in (1,676 mm) broad gauge

Construction
- Structure type: Standard (on-ground station)
- Parking: Not required

Other information
- Status: Functioning
- Station code: KPLH
- Zone(s): South Coast Railway
- Division(s): Vijayawada

History
- Opened: 1928
- Closed: 1940
- Rebuilt: 2004
Location
- Location within Andhra Pradesh Location within India
- Interactive map

Kotipalli railway station (station code:KPLH), located in the Indian state of Andhra Pradesh, serves Kotipalli in Konaseema district.

== Geography ==
Kotipalli railway station is located in the fringe areas of Konaseema region on the Godavari Delta.

== History ==
The Kakinada–Kotipalli branch line was first laid in 1928, but was removed in 1940 with the onset of World War II. The British rulers, then ruling in India, were facing shortage of steel and took away the tracks for use somewhere else. The 45-kilometre-long (28 mi) line was relaid at a cost of Rs. 67 crores (670 million). It was formally opened in November 2004. However, that was only a partly finished project.

== The balance of the project ==
The total project envisaged construction of two lines – the first from Kakinada to Kotipalli, and the second from Kotipally to Narsapur via Amalapuram. The 2001–02 estimates for the Kotipalli–Narsapur line was Rs. 710 crores (7.1 billion). The estimates are high because three bridges need to be constructed across three distributaries of the Godavari: first, a 3,550-metre-long (11,650 ft) bridge across the Gautami between Kotipalli and Mukteswaram, second, a 700-metre-long (2,300 ft) bridge across Vainateya, between Bodasakurru and Pasarlapudi, and third 750-metre-long (2,460 ft) across the Vasista between Narsapur and Sakinetipally. In the context of limited resources for funding projects in India, it is a tall order, and funds are coming only in trickles, as for example Rs. 2 Crores (20million) spent in acquiring 110 acres of land. Obviously, such a project had high-profile backers such as G. M. C. Balayogi who was Speaker of the Lok Sabha from 1998 to 2002, and S.P.B.K. Satyanarayana Rao, former union minister and MP from Rajahmundry.

Preceding station	Indian Railways	Following station
Gangavaram towards ?	South Coast Railway zone Kakinada–Kotipalli branch line	Terminus
