= Ongole railway station =

Railway station in Ongole, India

Ongole
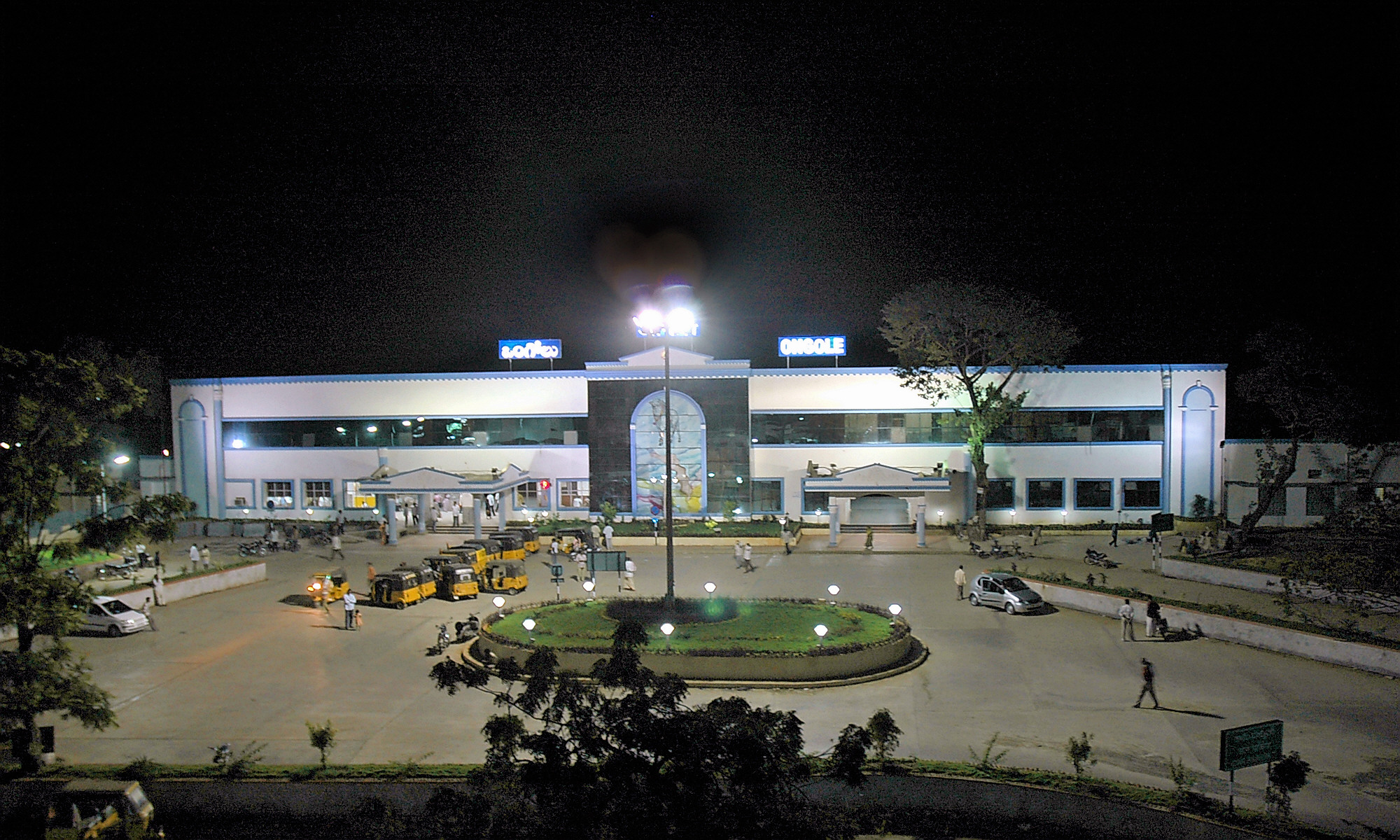
- Ongole railway station

General information
- Location: Railway Station Road, Venkaiah Swamy Nagar, Ongole, Prakasham district, Andhra Pradesh; India
- Coordinates: 15°29′52″N 80°03′24″E
- Elevation: 12 metres (39 ft)
- System: Commuter, Inter-city and Regional rail station
- Owner: Indian Railways
- Operator: South Coast Railways
- Lines: Delhi–Chennai line; Howrah–Chennai main line; Vijayawada–Chennai section
- Platforms: 5
- Tracks: 8 5 ft 6 in (1,676 mm) broad gauge

Construction
- Structure type: Standard (on ground)
- Accessible: Available

Other information
- Status: Active
- Station code: OGL
- Zone(s): South Coast Railway zone
- Division(s): Vijayawada
- Classification: Non-Suburban Grade-3 (NSG-3)

History
- Opened: 1899(125 years ago)
- Electrified: 1980–81(45 years ago)

Services
Preceding station	Indian Railways	Following station
Karavadi towards ?	South Coast Railway zone Vijayawada–Chennai section of Howrah–Chennai main line	Surareddipalem towards ?
Route map
Location
- Location within Andhra Pradesh Location within India
- Interactive map

Ongole railway station (station code: OGL) located in the Indian state of Andhra Pradesh, serves Ongole in Prakasam district. It is administered under Vijayawada railway division of South Coast Railway zone (formerly South Central Railway zone).

== History ==
The Vijayawada–Chennai link was established in 1899.

The Chirala–Elavur section was electrified in 1980–81.

== Classification ==
In terms of earnings and outward passengers handled, Ongole is categorized as a Non-Suburban Grade-3 (NSG-3) railway station. Based on the re–categorization of Indian Railway stations for the period of 2017–18 and 2022–23, an NSG–3 category station earns between ₹20–₹100 crore and handles 5–10 million passengers. Daily approximately 190+ trains halt at Ongole railway station.

== Station amenities ==
It is one of the 38 stations in the division to be equipped with Automatic Ticket Vending Machines (ATVMs). The Railway station recently got escalator for the convenience of passengers in the first platform. For the convenience of passengers two lifts were installed and recently made operational. Recently Platforms 4 and 5 constructed for freight and goods trains. Soon Passenger trains will halt in platforms 4 and 5 and trains are going to originate from this station.
