= Vijayawada railway division =

Railway division of India

Vijayawada Railway Division
Overview
- Headquarters: Vijayawada
- Reporting mark: BZA
- Locale: Andhra Pradesh, India
- Dates of operation: 16 May 1956 (70 years ago)–
- Predecessor: SCR

Technical
- Track gauge: 5 ft 6 in (1,676 mm)
- Previous gauge: Metre
- Length: 958.926 kilometres (595.849 mi)

Other
- Website: Official Website

Vijayawada railway division is one of the four divisions under South Coast Railway zone (SCoR) of the Indian Railways. The headquarters of the division is located at Vijayawada, Andhra Pradesh, India.

== History ==
It was formed as one of the eight divisions in Southern Railway on 16 May 1956. After the formation of South Central Railway zone, the division was integrated into it on 2 October 1966.

On 27 February 2019, this division was announced to be integrated with South Coast Railway zone with Visakhapatnam as its headquarters.

On 1 June 2026, Vijayawada railway division became part of South Coast Railway zone.

== Administration and jurisdiction ==
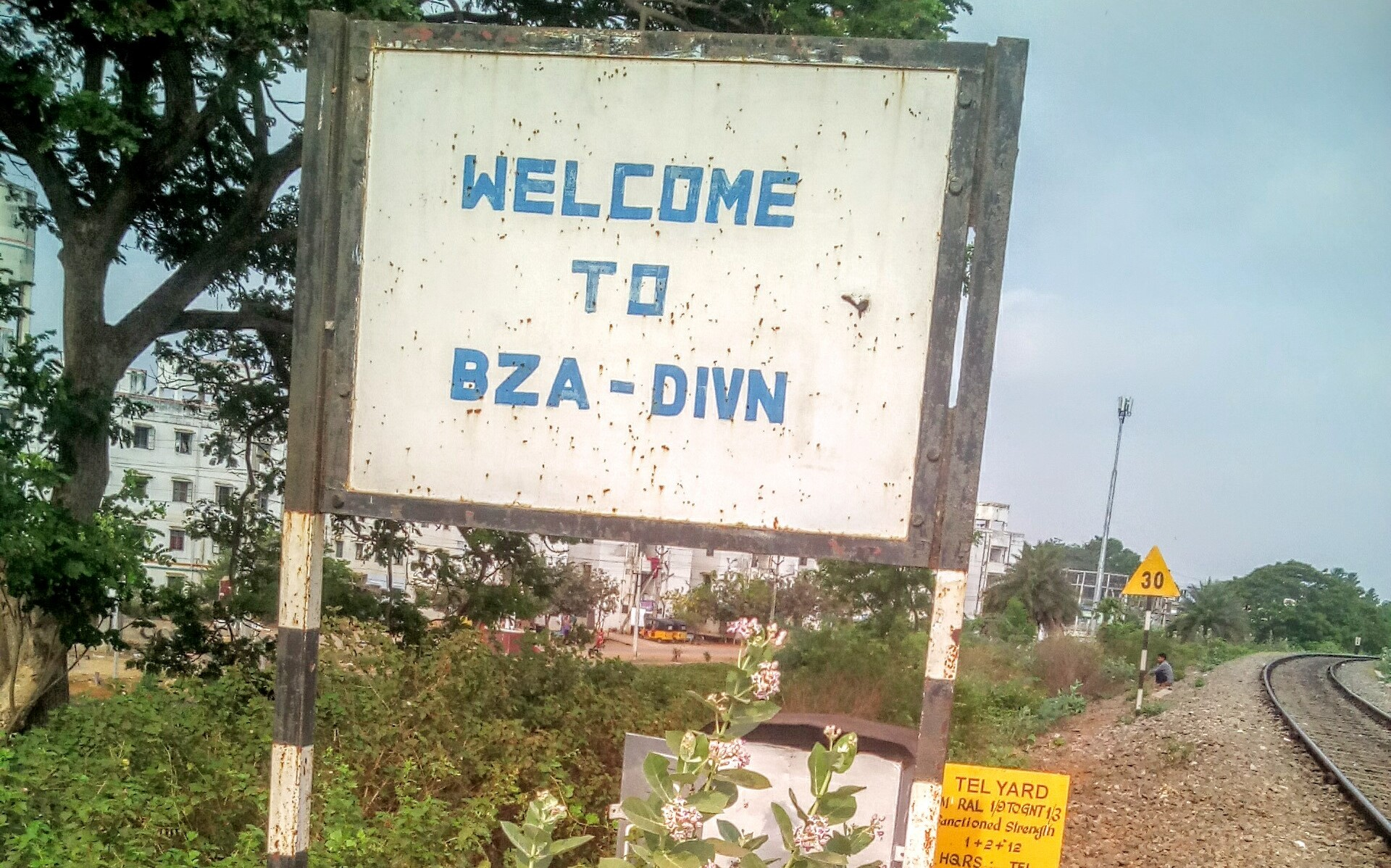
Start of Vijayawada railway division jurisdiction board on Tenali – Repalle branch line

Route map of Vijayawada railway division.

The division is located completely in the state of Andhra Pradesh. It has a broad gauge route of 957.23 km (594.80 mi) and a running track of 1,646.72 km (1,023.22 mi). It has a total electrified route of 733.25 km (455.62 mi) and a total track of 1,928 km (1,198 mi). The present Divisional Railway Manager is P.Srinivass.

=== Sections and branch lines ===
- Vijayawada–Duvvada
- Vijayawada–Gudur
- Vijayawada–Kondapalli
- Vijayawada–Nidadavolu
- Gudivada –Machilipatnam
- Bhimavaram–Narasapuram
- Samalkot–Kakinada Port

BZA division having single, electrified and double-track railway lines. Kondapalli railway station is the divisional interchange station.

The lines and sections under the jurisdiction of the Vijayawada division are listed below:

Route	Type of track	Traction	Route (km.)
Gudur–Duvvada (excl.) (km 134.30–759.7)	Double & Triple	Electric	623.66
Vijayawada– Motumarri(excl) (km 586.5–525.0)	Triple	Electric	61.5
Vijayawada–Nidadavolu loop line (Vijayawada–Bhimavaram Town–Nidadavolu)	Double	Electric	154.75
Bhimavaram–Narasapur branch line	Double	Electric	29.46
Gudivada–Machilipatnam	Double	Electric	36.70
Samalkot–Kakinada Port branch line	Double	Electric	15.60
Kakinada Town–Kotipalli	Single	Diesel	44.70
Obulavaripalli-Venkatachalam–Krishnapatnam Port	Single & Double	Electric	109.44
Total			1111.114

Under construction:

- Kotipalli-narasapur railway line
- Tripling of Double Electric Line from Kondapalle - Gudur

- Vijayawada Division System map
- Jurisdiction

Note:

- excl.– Station excluded / not under the divisional jurisdiction
- km– Kilometer measure of distance between two lines
- Vijayawada–Gudivada section (42.69 km) is covered in Vijayawada–Nidadavolu loop line. Duvvada–Gudur section covers, both Duvvada–Vijayawada section and Vijayawada–Gudur sections)

=== Stations categories ===
The revised station categorization is based on footfalls at the station and it includes three groups namely, Non-Suburban (NS), Suburban (S) and Halt (H). It is further divided into grades ranging from 1-6 for Non-Suburban, 1-3 for Suburban and 1-3 for Halt stations. As of 10 July 2018, there are a total of 161 stations in the division. Out of these, 108 are categorized as Non-suburban, 48 as Halt stations. Five stations namely, Nidiguntapalem, Venkatachalam, Krishnapatnam, Sarpavaram, Komarapudi does not handle any coaching traffic and six halt stations namely, Sitampet, Kaikoram, Marampalli, Kesavaram, Pedabrahmadevam, Gudaparti were closed.

Category	No. of stations	Name of stations
Non – Suburban
NSG-1	1	Vijayawada
NSG-2	Nil	
NSG-3	10	Bhimavaram Town, Eluru, Tadepalligudem, Gudur Junction, Kakinada Town, Nellore, Ongole, Rajamahendravaram, Samalkot Junction, Tenali Junction, Tuni
NSG-4	10	Chirala, Nidadavolu Junction, Kakinada Port, Kavali,Annavaram,Anakapalle, Bhimavaram Junction, Narasapur, Gudivada Junction
NSG-5	21	Akividu, Anaparti, Bapatla, Bitragunta, Dwarapudi, Elamanchili, Godavari, Kaikaluru, Kovvur, Machilipatnam, Narsipatnam Road, Nidubrolu, Nuzvid, Palakollu, Pedana, Pithapuram, Powerpet, Tanuku, Singarayakonda, Vedayapalem, Veeravasaram,
NSG-6	67	Alluru Road, Ammanabrolu, Aravalli, Attili, Appikatla, Badampudi, Bayyavaram, Bhimadolu, Bikkavolu, Chagallu, Chebrole, Chilakalapudi, Chinaganjam, Denduluru, Dosapadu, Duggirala, Gannavaram, Gollaprolu, Gudlavalleru, Gullipadu, Gunadala, Hamsavaram, Kadiyam, Kaldhari, Karapa, Karavadi, Kavutaram, Kodavalur, Kondapalli, Kotipalli, Krishna Canal, Mandavalli, Manubolu, Medapadu, Moturu, Mustabada, Navabpalem, Narasingapalli, Nidamanuru, Padugupadu, Pallevada, Peda Avutapalli, Pedavadlapudi, Pennada Agraharam, Pulla, Ramachandrapuram, Ramavarappadu, Ravikampadu, Rayanapadu, Regupalem, Srivenkateswarapalem, Stuartpuram, Surareddipalem, Talamanchi, Tarigopulla, Tanguturu, Telaprolu, Tettu, Thadi, Tsunduru, Ulavapadu, Undi, Uppaluru, Uppugundur, Vatlur, Vetapalem, Venkatachalam
Halts
HG-1	1	Nellore South
HG-2	20	Chiluvur, Durgada gate, Indupalli, Ipurupalem, Jandrapeta, Kadavakuduru, Kasimkota, Kolakaluru, Kothapandillapalli, Machavaram, Madhuranagar Halt, Manchili, Modukuru, Raparla, Relangi, Pasivedala, Putlacheruvu, Srungavruksham, Vadlamannadu, Vendra
HG-3	26	Aratlakatta, Cherukuvada, Chintaparru, Balabadhrapuram, Brahmanagudem, Draksharamam, Gangavaram, Guntakoduru, Kolanukonda, Kovvada, Kunduru, Lakshminarayanapuram, Lankalakoderu, Mokhasakalavapudi, Narasapurapupeta, Nujella, Pasalapudi, Satyavada, Tennuru, Timmapuram, Unguturu, Vakada, Veeravalli, Velangi, Velpuru, Ventrapragada
Total	156	-

- Source: Stations – Category-wise (NEW)

== Performance and earnings ==
The division operates around 274 passenger and 150 freight trains every day. There are a total of 222 electric, 34 diesel locos, 838 coaches, 29 MEMU, 37 DEMU's. Vijayawada railway division generates much of its revenue from freight transport, which includes major commodities like coal, fertilisers, food grains, cement etc. Krishnapatnam and Kakinada Ports are the two main revenue earners for the division in freight transport. During 2013–14, it handled a divisional record of 100 million passengers. In the financial year 2018–19, the gross earnings of the division were a whooping ₹5,137.00 crore (US$530 million). It includes, ₹3,965.29 crore (US$410 million) in terms of freight and ₹1,042.23 crore (US$110 million) by passenger transport. In the same fiscal year, it recorded as the only division with 9.3 metric tonnes of freight loading in the country.

The below table shows the revenue and serving traffic of both passenger and freight from 2017–18 financial year.

Revenue (in million rupees)	2017–18	2018–19
Freight	26465.0	39652.9
Passenger	9823.4	10422.3
Gross (includes sundry / other revenues)	37480.5	51,370.0

== Awards and achievements ==
- The office of the Vijayawada Divisional Regional Manager was awarded the certified by the National Energy Conservation Award (NECA)-2013 based on the steps taken on energy efficiency. It also won 19 of 58 shields based on its performance in 2013.
- During the 64th Railway week, the division was awarded General Manager's Efficiency and 11 other awards.
- Vijayawada railway station was awarded Green Railway Stations Certificate by Indian Green Building Council (IGBC), which secured 71 points out of 100.

== See also ==
- Visakhapatnam railway division
- Guntur railway division

== See also ==
- Divisions of Indian Railways
- Guntur railway division
