= Chirala railway station =

Indian railway station

Chirala
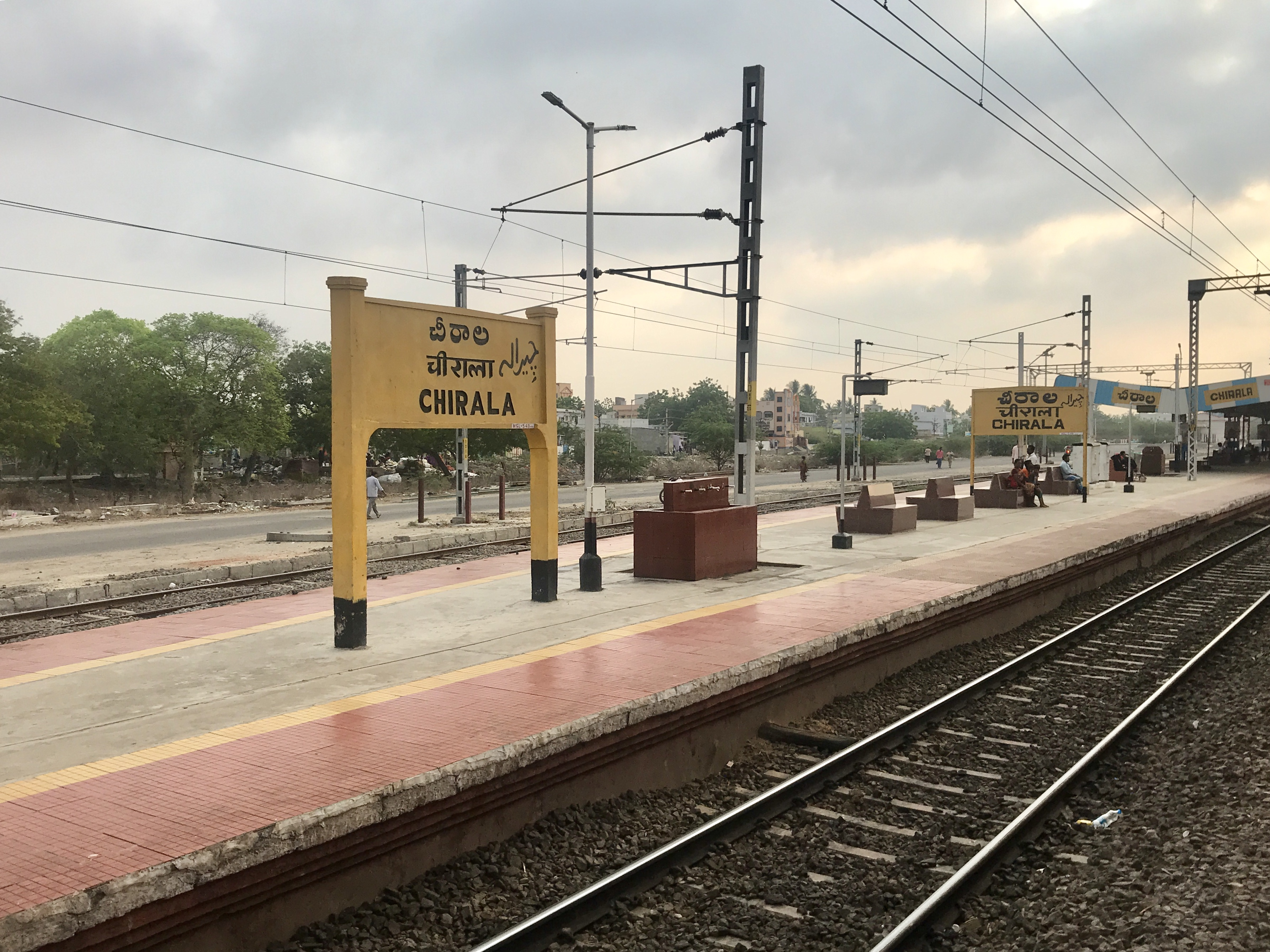
- Chirala railway signboard

General information
- Location: Goods Shed Rd, Chirala, Andhra Pradesh; India
- Coordinates: 15°49′53″N 80°21′13″E
- System: Indian Railways station
- Owner: Indian Railways
- Operator: South Coast Railway zone
- Line: Vijayawada–Chennai section
- Platforms: 6
- Tracks: 6

Construction
- Structure type: Standard (on-ground station)
- Parking: Yes

Other information
- Status: Active
- Station code: CLX
- Zone(s): South Coast Railway zone
- Division(s): Vijayawada
- Fare zone: Indian Railways

History
- Opened: 1899

Services
Preceding station	Indian Railways	Following station
Ipurupalem Halt towards ?	South Coast Railway zone Vijayawada–Chennai section of Howrah–Chennai main line	Jandrapeta towards ?
Location
- Location within India Location within Andhra Pradesh
- Interactive map

Chirala railway station (station code:CLX) is located at Chirala town of Bapatla district, in the Indian state of Andhra Pradesh. It is administered under Vijayawada railway division of South Coast Railway zone (formerly South Central Railway zone).

== History ==
The Vijayawada–Chennai link was established in 1899. The Chirala–Elavur section was electrified in 1980–81.

== Classification ==
In terms of earnings and outward passengers handled, Chirala is categorized as a Non-Suburban Grade-3(NSG-3) railway station. Based on the re–categorization of Indian Railway stations for the period of 2017–18 and 2022–23, an NSG–3 category station earns between ₹20–₹100 crore and handles 5–10 million passengers.

== Station amenities ==
It is one of the 38 stations in the division to be equipped with Automatic Ticket Vending Machines (ATVMs).
