= Nellore railway station =

Railway station in Andhra Pradesh

Nellore
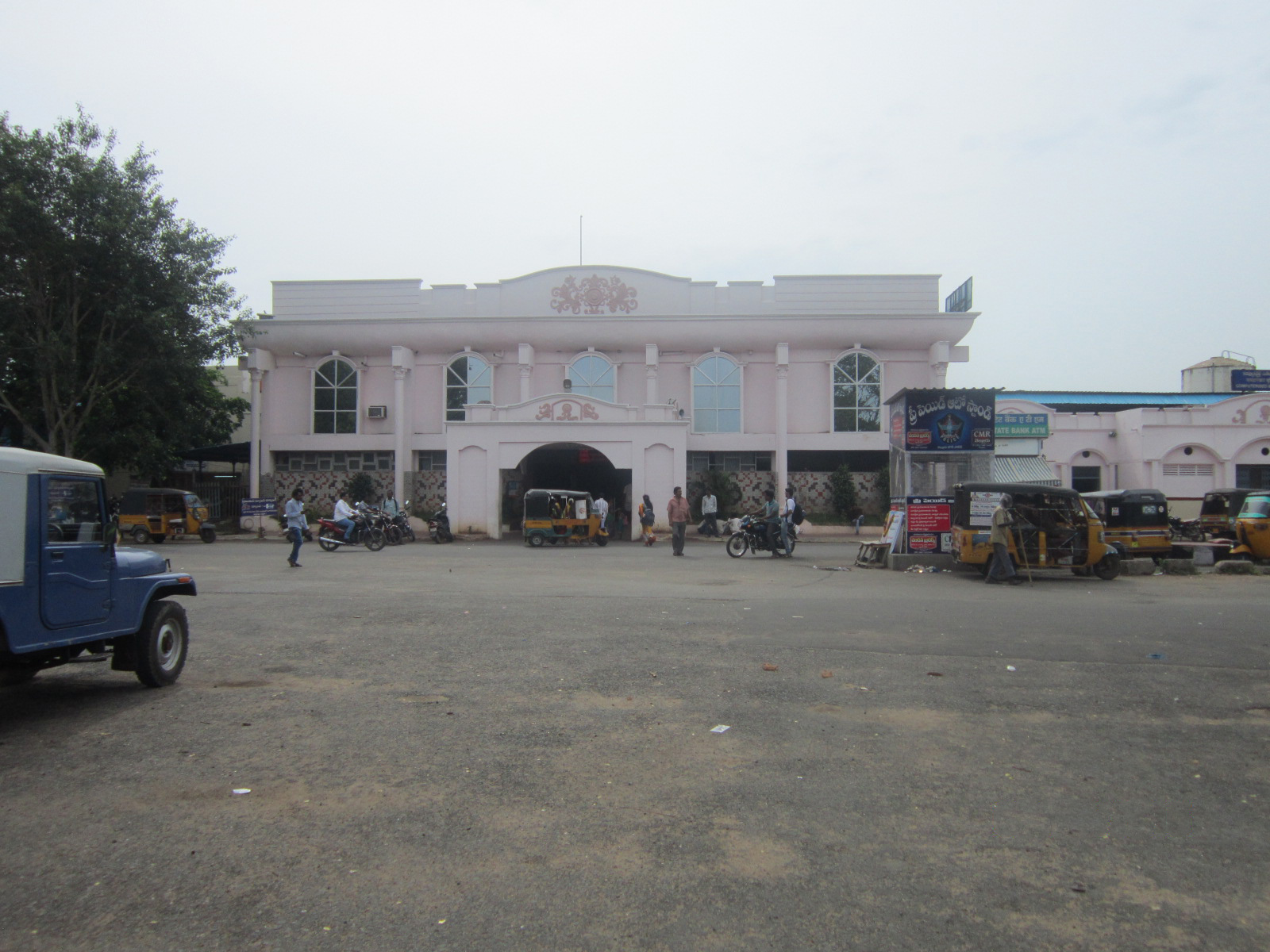
- Entrance of Nellore City train station

General information
- Location: Railway Station Road, Santhapet, Nellore, Andhra Pradesh; India
- Coordinates: 14°27′43″N 79°59′14″E
- System: Indian Railways station
- Owner: Indian Railways
- Operator: Indian Railways
- Lines: Delhi–Chennai line; Howrah–Chennai main line; Vijayawada–Chennai section
- Platforms: 4
- Tracks: 5 5 ft 6 in (1,676 mm) broad gauge

Construction
- Structure type: Standard (on ground)
- Accessible: Disabled access

Other information
- Status: Operational
- Station code: NLR
- Zone(s): SCoR
- Division(s): Vijayawada
- Classification: Non-Suburban Grade-3 (NSG-3)

History
- Opened: 1899
- Electrified: 1980–81

Services
Preceding station	Indian Railways	Following station
Padugupadu towards ?	South Central Railway zone Vijayawada–Chennai section of Howrah–Chennai main line and Delhi–Chennai line	Nellore South towards ?
Route map
Location
- Location within Andhra Pradesh Location within India
- Interactive map

Nellore railway station (station code:NLR) is a railway station of the city of Nellore in the Indian state of Andhra Pradesh. It is situated on Vijayawada–Gudur section and is administered under Vijayawada railway division of South Coast Railway zone (formerly South Central Railway zone).

== History ==
The Vijayawada–Chennai link was established in 1899. The Chirala–Elavur section was electrified in 1980–81.

== Classification ==
In terms of earnings and outward passengers handled, Nellore is categorized as a Non-Suburban Grade-3 (NSG-3) railway station. Based on the re–categorization of Indian Railway stations for the period of 2017–18 and 2022–23, an NSG–3 category station earns between ₹20–₹100 crore and handles 5–10 million passengers. It has been selected for the Adarsh Station Scheme, a scheme for upgradation of stations by the Indian Railways.

== Structure and amenities ==
Nellore railway station is having escalators on 4 platforms. SCR recently installed Automatic Ticket Vending Machines (ATVM)s in Nellore station. It is amongst the top hundred booking stations of Indian Railway. Daily 140 trains, including 132 express trains and 6 passenger trains and 2 EMU/DMU are passing through this station. Nellore railway station was ranked as the 28th cleanest railway station in the country. The Railways ministry has announced that the Nellore Railway station will be modified with world class amenities and its look will be beautified under the ambitious project of "Redevelopment of Railway stations" with Rs 100 crores.
