= Nellore Urban Development Authority =

Agency overview
- Formed: 4 November 2016
- Type: Urban Planning Agency
- Jurisdiction: Government of Andhra Pradesh
- Headquarters: Nellore; 14.442668°N 79.986882°E
- Minister responsible: Municipal Administration and Urban Development Department, Andhra Pradesh
- Agency executive: Kotamreddy Srinivasulu Reddy, Chairman
- Website: https://nudaap.in/

The Nellore Urban Development Authority (NUDA) is an urban planning agency spread over the district of Nellore of the Indian state of Andhra Pradesh. It was constituted on 1 February 2016, under Andhra Pradesh Metropolitan Region and Urban Development Authority Act, 2016 with the headquarters located at Nellore.

== Jurisdiction ==
The jurisdictional area of NUDA is spread over an area of 1,644.17 km^{2} (634.82 sq mi). It covers 156 villages in 21 mandals of Nellore districts. Of these, 19 mandals are from Nellore district with 145 villages. Nellore is the only corporation and municipalities viz., Kavali also a part of NUDA. Kotamreddy Srinivasulu Reddy is the first chairman of NUDA. The current chairman is Mukkala Dwarakanath, who worked as deputy mayor for Nellore Municipal corporation previously.

Nellore Urban Development Authority (NUDA) will cover the areas as mentioned below:-

Sl. No	Name of the Mandal	Number of Villages
1	Kavali(Part)	3
2	Jaladanki(Part)	1
3	Bogole(Part)	4
4	Dagadarthi(Part)	4
5	Alluru(Part)	2
6	Kodavaluru(Part)	11
7	Kovur(Part)	7
8	Nellore Rural (Part)	8
9	T.P. Guduru(Part)	2
10	Muthukur(Part)	14
11	Venkatachalam(Part)	15
12	Manubolu(Part)	9
Total		80
