= New Delhi – Chennai main line =

Railway line in India

New Delhi–Chennai main line
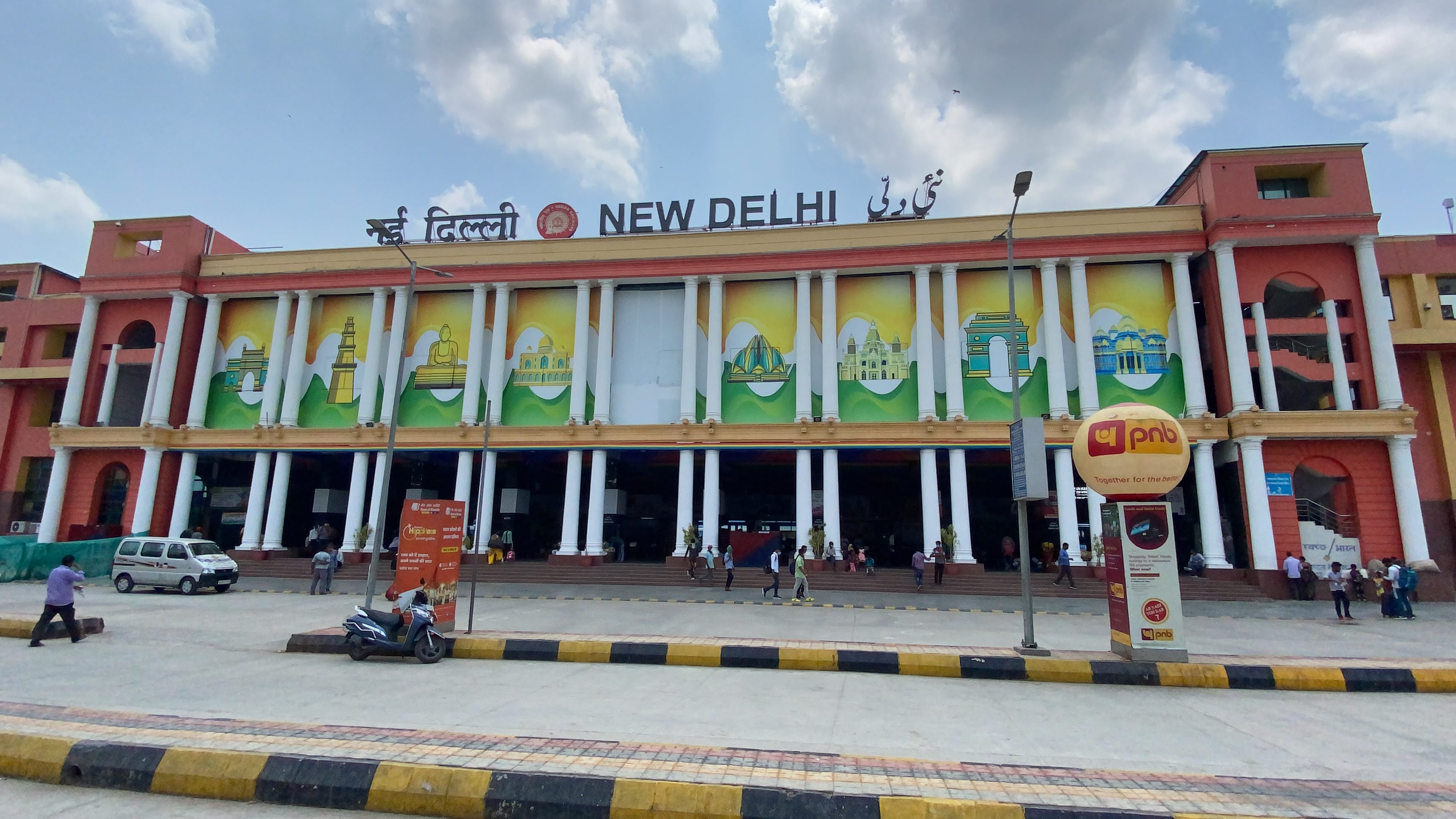
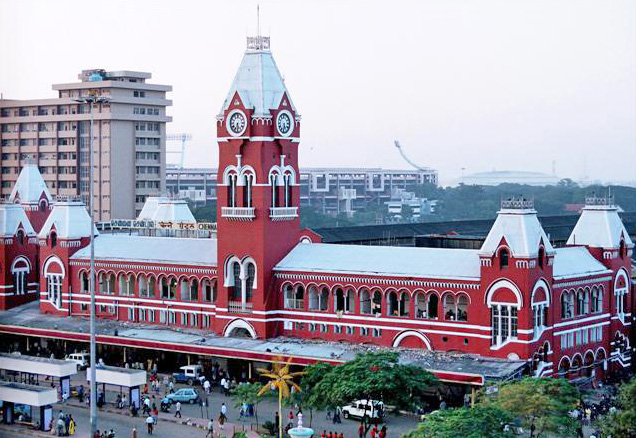
- New Delhi (top) and Chennai Central, the termini of the New Delhi–Chennai line

Overview
- Status: Operational
- Owner: Indian Railways
- Locale: Delhi; Haryana; Uttar Pradesh; Rajasthan; Madhya Pradesh; Maharashtra; Telangana; Andhra Pradesh; Tamil Nadu
- Termini: New Delhi; Chennai Central

Service
- Operators: Northern Railway; North Central Railway; Central Railway; South Central Railway; Southern Railway

History
- Opened: 1929; 97 years ago

Technical
- Line length: 2,182 km (1,356 mi)
- Number of tracks: 3/4
- Track gauge: 5 ft 6 in (1,676 mm) broad gauge
- Electrification: 25 kV 50 Hz AC Overhead line
- Operating speed: 160 km/h (99 mph) (maximum)
Route map
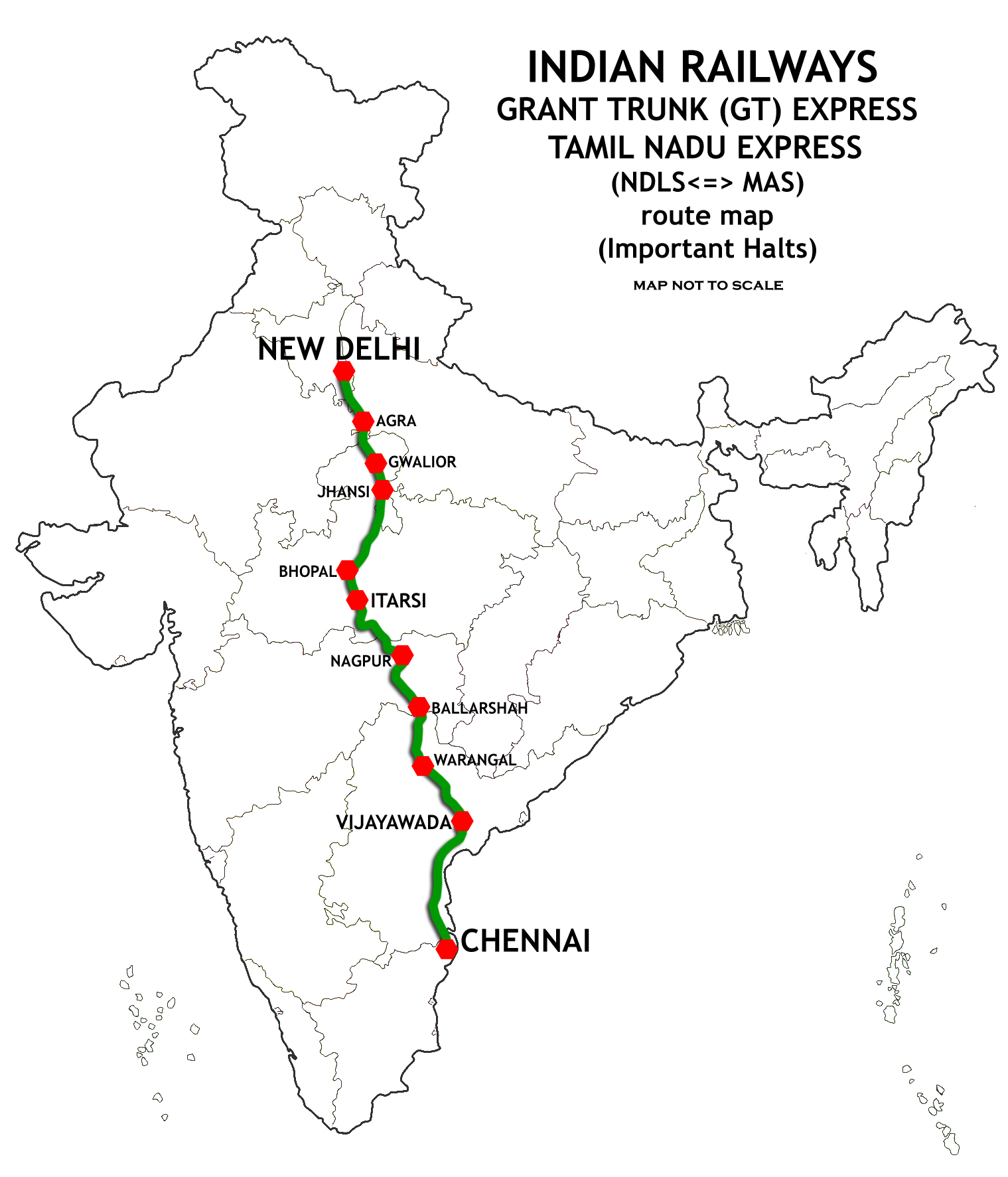

The New Delhi–Chennai line, earlier known as Delhi–Madras line, is an Indian railway line connecting New Delhi and Chennai Central. It is one of the seven major trunk routes of the Indian Railways. It traverses about 2,182 km (1,356 mi) across the states of Delhi, Haryana, Uttar Pradesh, Rajasthan, Madhya Pradesh, Maharashtra, Telangana, Andhra Pradesh, and Tamil Nadu. The line forms part of the planned Diamond Quadrilateral rail network. The route is used by the Grand Trunk Express and as such is referred to as the Grand Trunk Route.

== History ==
The Agra–Delhi chord was opened in 1904. Some parts of it were relaid during the construction of New Delhi (inaugurated in 1927–28).

The Agra–Gwalior line was opened by the Maharaja of Gwalior in 1881 and it became the Scindia State Railway.

The Indian Midland Railway built the Gwalior–Jhansi line and the Jhansi–Bhopal line in 1889.

The Bhopal–Itarsi line was opened by the Begum of Bhopal in 1884. Itarsi was linked with Nagpur between 1923 and 1924.

The period of construction of the Nagpur–Balharshah line is uncertain.

The Vijayawad–Madras line was constructed in 1899.

The Wadi–Secunderabad line was built in 1874 with financing by the Nizam of Hyderabad. It later became part of Nizam's Guaranteed State Railway. In 1889, the main line of the Nizam's Guaranteed State Railway was extended to Vijayawada, then known as Bezwada.

With the completion of the Kazipet–Balharshah link in 1929, Madras was directly linked to Delhi.

== Intermediate branch lines ==
Branch	Length
Nizamabad–Peddapalli	177 km (110 mi)
Nagpur–Secunderabad line	581 km (361 mi)
Kazipet–Vijayawada section	201 km (125 mi)

== Sections ==
The 2,182 km (1,356 mi)-long trunk line, amongst the long and busy trunk lines connecting the metros, has been treated in more detail in smaller sections:

1. Agra Chord
2. Agra–Bhopal section
3. Bhopal–Nagpur section
4. Nagpur–Kazipet section
5. Kazipet–Vijayawada section
6. Vijayawada–Chennai section

== Electrification ==
The Vijayawada–Madras section electrified by 1980.

The Vijayawada–Kazipet sector was electrified in 1985–88.

The Kazipet–Ramagundam–Balharshah–Nagpur sector was electrified in 1987–89.

The Bhopal–Itarsi sector was electrified in 1988–89 and the Nagpur–Itarsi sector in 1990–91.

The Agra–Bhopal sector was electrified in 1984–89.

The Agra–Faridabad section was electrified in 1982–85.

== Speed limits ==
The Delhi–Chennai line (Grand Trunk route) is classified as a "Group A" line which can take speeds up to 160 km/h.

== Passenger movement ==
New Delhi, Mathura Junction, Agra Cantt., Gwalior, Jhansi, Bhopal, Rani Kamalapati, Itarsi, Nagpur, Ramagundam, Warangal, Vijayawada, Gudur and Chennai Central, on this line, are amongst the top hundred booking stations of Indian Railway.

== Diamond quadrilateral ==
The Delhi–Chennai line is a part of the diamond quadrilateral. The routes connecting the four major metropolises (New Delhi, Mumbai, Chennai and Kolkata), along with their diagonals, known as the diamond quadrilateral, carry about half the freight and nearly half the passenger traffic, although they form only 16 per cent of the length.
