= Vijayawada–Gudur section =

Railway route in India

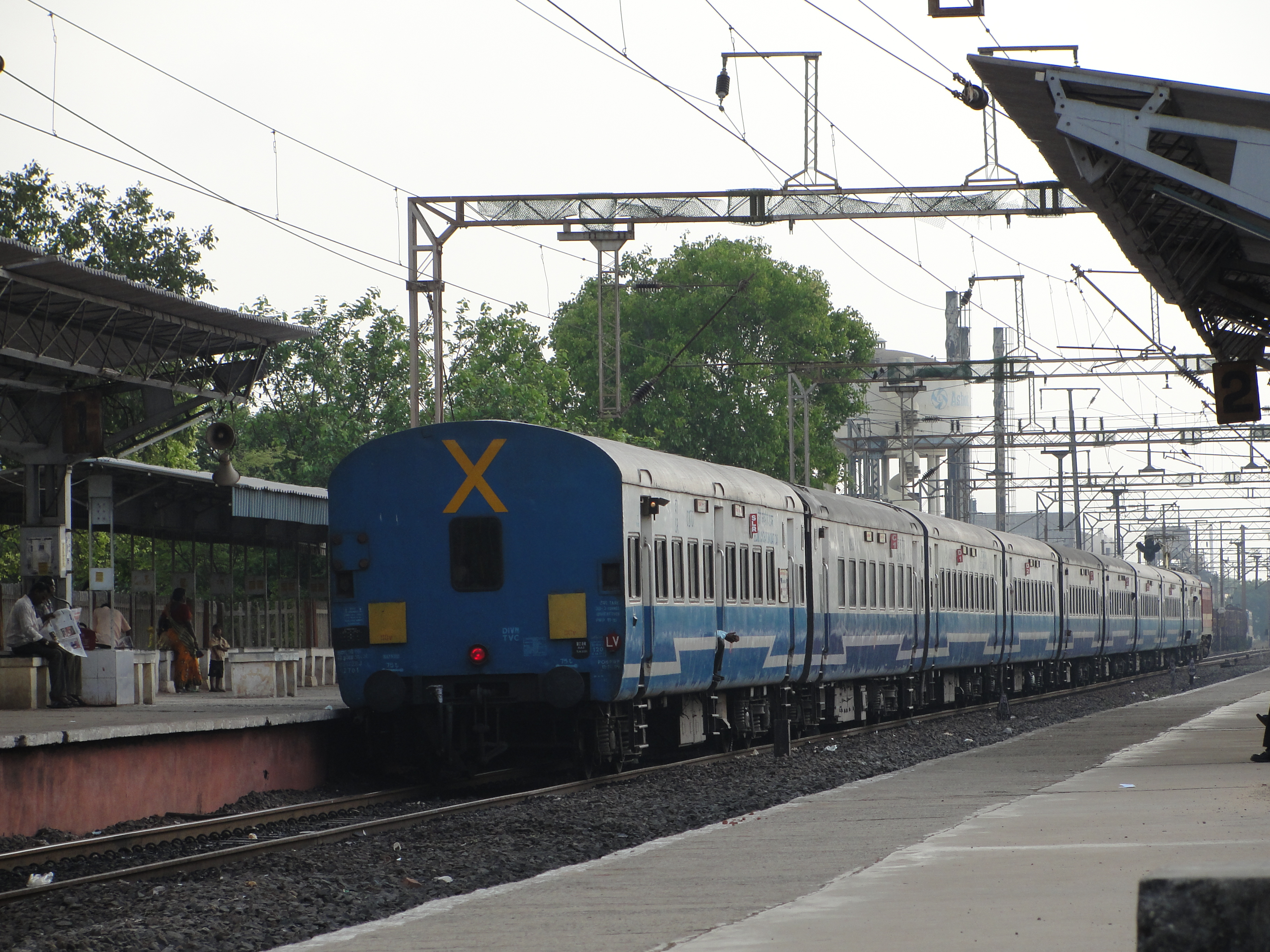
- Vijayawada Jan Shatabdi Express is an important train on the Vijayawada–Gudur section

Overview
- Status: Operational
- Owner: Indian Railways
- Locale: Andhra Pradesh, Tamil Nadu
- Termini: Vijayawada; Gudur

Service
- Operator(s): South Coast Railway, Southern Railway

History
- Opened: 1899

Technical
- Track length: 455 km (283 mi)
- Number of tracks: 2
- Track gauge: 5 ft 6 in (1,676 mm) broad gauge
- Electrification: Yes
- Operating speed: up to 130 km/h (81 mph)
Route map
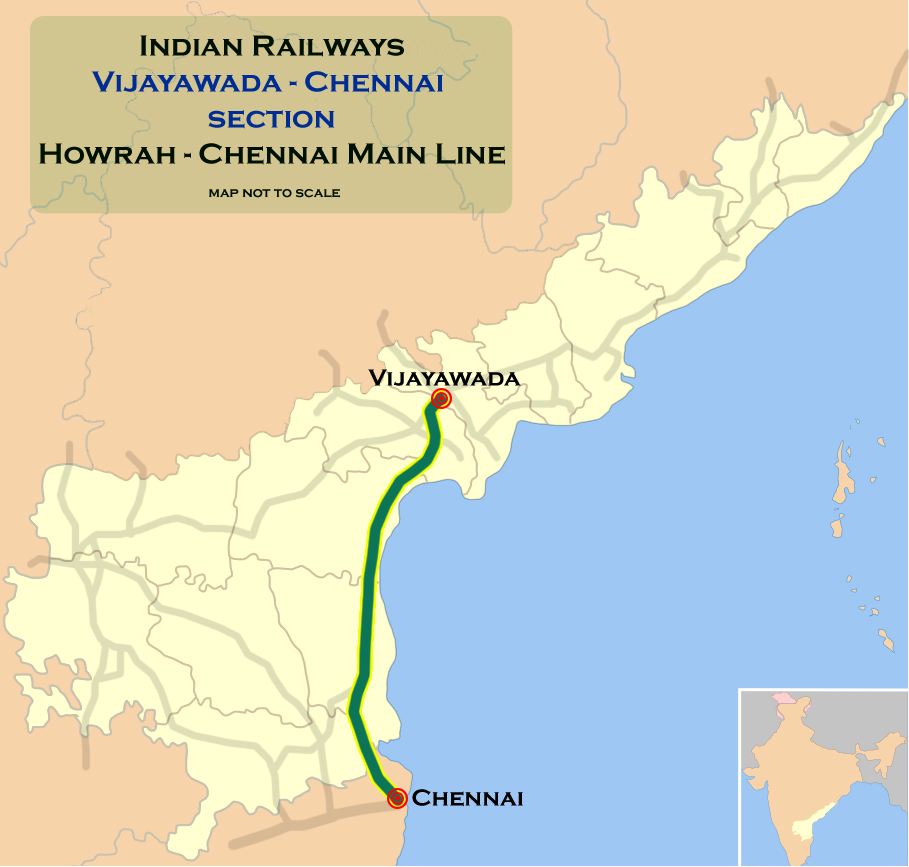
- Source:Google maps, Indiarailinfo/Vijayawada-Chennai Jan Shatabdi, Delta Fast Passenger

The Vijayawada–Gudur section is a railway line connecting Vijayawada in the Indian state of Andhra Pradesh and Gudur. The main line is part of the Howrah–Chennai and New Delhi–Chennai main lines.

== Geography ==
The Vijayawada–Gudur line runs along the Coromandel Coast, lying between the Eastern Ghats and the Bay of Bengal. The main line crosses the Krishna immediately after its departure from Vijayawada.

=== Railway zone jurisdiction ===
The track from Vijayawada to Gudur is under the administrative jurisdiction of South Central Railway

== History ==
The Southern Mahratta Railway Company linked Goa with Guntakal with a metre-gauge line and also linked Vijayawada with Mormugao in 1890. During the period 1893 to 1896, 1,287 km (800 mi) of the East Coast State Railway, from Vijayawada to Cuttack was built and opened to traffic, and construction of the Vijayawada–Gudur link in 1899 enabled the through running of trains along the eastern coast of India. The southern part of the East Coast State Railway (from Waltair to Vijayawada) was taken over by Madras Railway in 1901. The track doubled during the period from 1 April to 31 October, Bezwada-Gudur section 1958 is 7.5 Mils. Total mileage under construction is about 46 miles of which 5 miles i«s readv for opening and another 8 miles of permanent wav have been linked. The Section is beaingdoubling part of a mileage aggregating 101 By April 1959 about 40 miles is ex-pected to be completed As the earth-work and bridging involved is heavy, no definite date for completion of the balance can yet be given but it t« expected that the full 101 miles will br readv by 31 March 1961.

=== Railway reorganization ===
In the early 1950s legislation was passed authorizing the central government to take over independent railway systems that were there. On 14 April 1951 the Madras and Southern Mahratta Railway, the South Indian Railway Company and Mysore State Railway were merged to form Southern Railway. Subsequently, Nizam's Guaranteed State Railway was also merged into Southern Railway. On 2 October 1966, the Secunderabad, Solapur, Hubli and Vijayawada Divisions, covering the former territories of Nizam's Guaranteed State Railway and certain portions of Madras and Southern Mahratta Railway were separated from Southern Railway to form the South Central Railway. In 1977, Guntakal division of Southern Railway was transferred to South Central Railway and the Solapur division transferred to Central Railway. Amongst the seven new zones created in 2010 was South Western Railway, which was carved out of Southern Railway.

== Electrification ==
Howrah–Chennai Mail was the first train in South Eastern Railway to be hauled by a diesel engine (WDM-1) in 1965. The Vijayawada–Gudur–Chennai section was completely electrified by 1980. The Howrah–Chennai route was completely electrified by 2005. Section-wise electrification was as follows: Vijayawada–Chirala 1979–80; Chirala–Ongole, Ongole–Ulavapadu, Ulavapadu–Bitragunta, Bitragunta–Pagudupadu, Gudur–Venkatagiri, Venkatagiri–Renigunta, and Renigunta–Tirupati 1983–85; Krishna Canal–Guntur, Krishna Canal–Tenali and Guntur–Tenali 1987–89; Arakkonam–Renigunta 1982–85.

== Speed limits ==
The New Delhi to Puratchi Thalaivar Dr. M.G. Ramachandran Central Railway Station line (Grand Trunk route), of which the Vijayawada–Gudur section is a part, is planned to be upgraded into a "Group A" line which will enable it to take speeds up to 160 km/h. On the branch lines the speed limit is 100 km/h.

== Passenger movement ==
Puratchi Thalaivar Dr. M.G. Ramachandran Central railway station, Vijayawada and Nellore, on the main line, and Tirupati Main and Vellore Katpadi, on branch lines, are amongst the top hundred booking stations of Indian Railway.
