= Howrah–Chennai main line =

Railway route in India

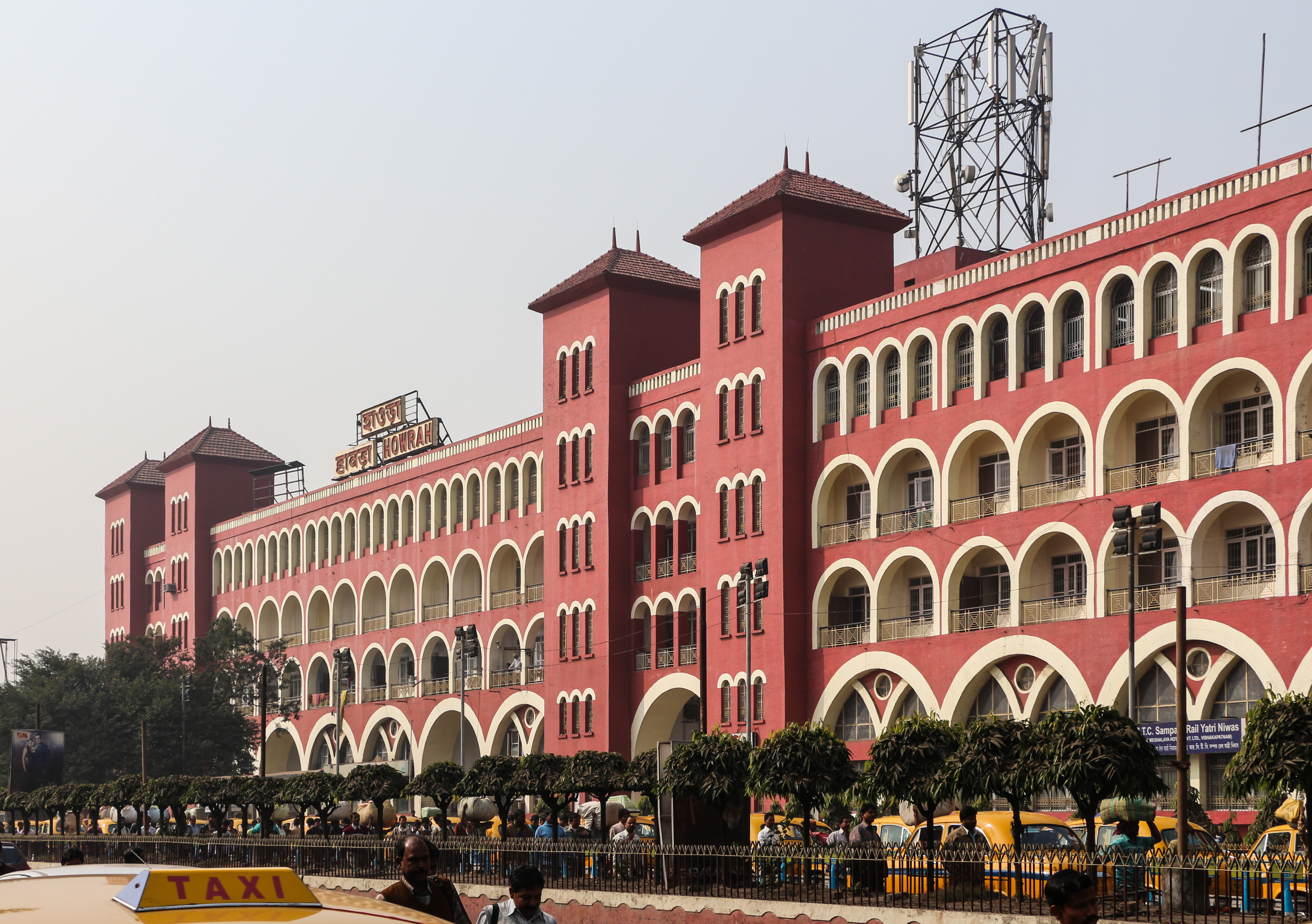
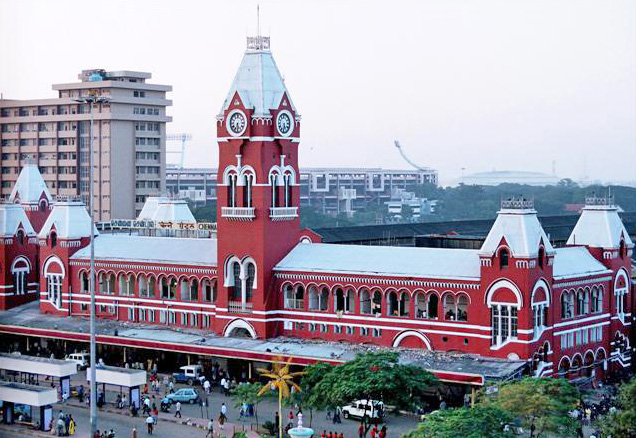
- Howrah (top) and Chennai Central, the termini of the Howrah–Chennai line

Overview
- Status: Operational
- Owner: Indian Railways
- Locale: West Bengal; Odisha; Andhra Pradesh; Tamil Nadu
- Termini: Howrah; Chennai Central

Service
- Operators: South Eastern Railway; East Coast Railway; South Coast Railway; Southern Railway

History
- Opened: 1901

Technical
- Line length: 1,661 km (1,032 mi)
- Number of tracks: 2
- Track gauge: 5 ft 6 in (1,676 mm) broad gauge
- Electrification: 25 kV AC overhead line
- Operating speed: 160 km/h (99 mph)
Route map
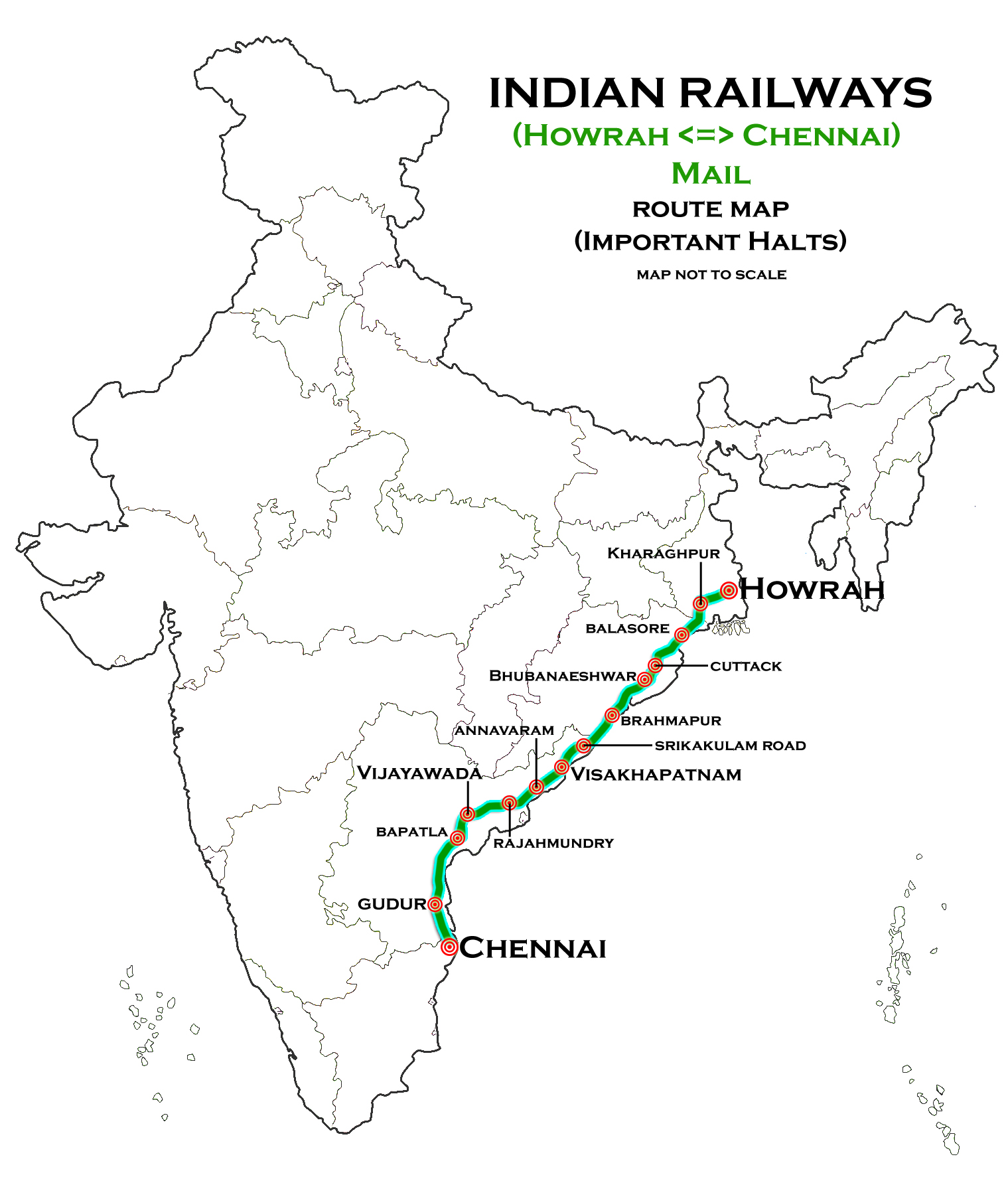

The Howrah–Chennai main line is an Indian railway line connecting Howrah and Chennai Central. It is one of the seven major trunk routes of the Indian Railways. It traverses about 1,661 km (1,032 mi) along the eastern coast of India across the states of West Bengal, Odisha, Andhra Pradesh, and Tamil Nadu.

== Sections ==
The 1,661 km (1,032 mi) long trunk line has been treated in more detail in its sections:

1. Howrah–Kharagapur section (approximately 115 km (71 mi)
2. Kharagpur–Khurda Road section (approximately 363.1 km (225.6 mi)
3. Khurda Road–Visakhapatnam section (approximately 430 km (270 mi))
4. Nidadavole–Narsapuram section
5. Duvvada–Vijayawada section (approximately 350 km (220 mi)) (from Anakapalle south) South Coast Railway zone
6. Vijayawada–Gudur section (approximately 310 km (190 mi)) South Coast Railway zone
7. Gudur–Chennai section (approximately 140 km (87 mi)) (except Gudur Junction) Southern Railway zone

== Geography ==
The Howrah–Chennai main line traverses the Eastern Coastal Plains crossing such major rivers as the Mahanadi, Godavari and Krishna. The coastal plains lying between the Eastern Ghats and the Bay of Bengal are fertile agricultural lands with high density of population.

== History ==
The Howrah–Delhi main line was the first trunk route in India connecting two metropolises. It was opened in 1866. The second trunk route was Howrah–Prayagraj–Mumbai line, opened in 1870. The Howrah–Nagpur–Mumbai line was opened in 1900 as the third trunk route in the country. Close on its heels was the Howrah–Madras main line in 1901.

The first train service in southern India was operated from Royapuram/Vyasarpadi Jeeva in Chennai to Walajah Road, near Vellore, covering around 100 km (62 mi) long, and operated by Madras Railway Company, on 1 July 1856. Several other lines were also developed. During the period 1893 to 1896, 1,287 km (800 mi) of the East Coast State Railway, from Vijayawada Junction to Cuttack was built and opened to traffic, and construction of the Vijayawada–Madras link in 1899 enabled the through running of trains along the eastern coast of India.Bengal Nagpur Railway was working on both the Howrah–Kharagpur and Kharagpur–Cuttack lines, completed the bridge over the Rupnarayan in 1900 and the Mahanadi in 1901, thus completing the through connection between Chennai and Kolkata.

=== Railway reorganization ===
The southern part of the East Coast State Railway (from Waltair to Vijayawada) was taken over by Madras Railway in 1901. The 514 km (319 mi) long northern portion of the East Coast line to Cuttack, including the branch line to Puri, was taken over by Bengal Nagpur Railway in 1902.

In 1908 Madras Railway was merged with the Southern Mahratta Railway to form Madras and Southern Mahratta Railway.

In the early 1950s legislation was passed authorizing the central government to take over independent railway systems that were there. On 14 April 1951 the Madras and Southern Mahratta Railway, the South Indian Railway Company and Mysore State Railway were merged to form Southern Railway. Subsequently, Nizam's Guaranteed State Railway was also merged into Southern Railway. On 2 October 1966, the Secunderabad, Solapur, Hubli and Vijayawada Divisions, covering the former territories of Nizam's Guaranteed State Railway and certain portions of Madras and Southern Mahratta Railway were separated from Southern Railway to form the South Central Railway. In 1977, Guntakal division of Southern Railway was transferred to South Central Railway and the Solapur division transferred to Central Railway. Amongst the seven new zones created in 2010 was South Western Railway, which was carved out of Southern Railway.

The Bengal Nagpur Railway was nationalized in 1944.Eastern Railway was formed on 14 April 1952 with the portion of East Indian Railway Company east of Mughalsarai and the Bengal Nagpur Railway. In 1955, South Eastern Railway was carved out of Eastern Railway. It comprised lines mostly operated by BNR earlier. Amongst the new zones started in April 2003 were East Coast Railway and South East Central Railway. Both these railways were carved out of South Eastern Railway. Amongst the new zone to be started in April 2020 is South Coast Railway this railway was carved out of South Central Railway and East Coast Railway.

The line was the site of one of India's worst rail disasters, the 2023 Odisha train collision.

== Electrification ==
Howrah–Chennai Mail was the first train in South Eastern Railway to be hauled by a diesel engine (WDM-1) in 1965.

The Howrah–Chennai route was completely electrified by 2005.

== Speed limits ==
The New Delhi –Chennai Central line of which the Vijayawada–Chennai section is a part, and Howrah–Nagpur–Mumbai line, of which the Howrah–Kharagpur section is a part, are planned to be upgraded as "Group A" lines which can take speeds up to 160 km/h. The Kharagpur-Vijayawada sector is classified as a Group B line which can take speeds up to 130 km/h.

== Passenger movement ==
The main passenger train services along this line are the Howrah–Chennai Mail and the Coromandel Express. Howrah, Kharagpur, Balasore, Cuttack, Bhubaneswar, Brahmapur, Vizianagaram, Visakhapatnam, Rajahmundry, Eluru, Vijayawada, Nellore, Ongole, Gudur and Chennai Central on this line are amongst the top hundred booking stations of Indian Railway.

== Golden quadrilateral ==
The Howrah–Chennai main line is a part of the golden quadrilateral. The routes connecting the four major metropolises (New Delhi, Mumbai, Chennai and Kolkata), along with their diagonals, known as the golden quadrilateral, carry about half the freight and nearly half the passenger traffic, although they form only 16 per cent of the length.
