= Sainagar Shirdi–Kakinada Port Express =

Train in India

Kakinada Port–Sainagar Shirdi Express
Overview
- Service type: Express
- Locale: Maharashtra, Karnataka, Telangana & Andhra Pradesh
- First service: 16 August 2000; 25 years ago
- Current operator: South Coast Railways

Route
- Termini: Kakinada Port (COA); Sainagar Shirdi (SNSI)
- Stops: 36
- Distance travelled: 1,338 km (831 mi)
- Average journey time: 26 hours 45 mins
- Service frequency: Tri-weekly
- Train number: 17205 / 17206

On-board services
- Classes: First AC, AC 2 Tier, AC 3 Tier, AC 3 Tier Economy, Sleeper Class & General Unreserved
- Seating arrangements: Yes
- Sleeping arrangements: Yes
- Catering facilities: On-board catering E-catering
- Observation facilities: Large windows
- Baggage facilities: Available

Technical
- Rolling stock: LHB coach
- Track gauge: 1,676 mm (5 ft 6 in)
- Operating speed: 51 km/h (32 mph) average including halts
Route map
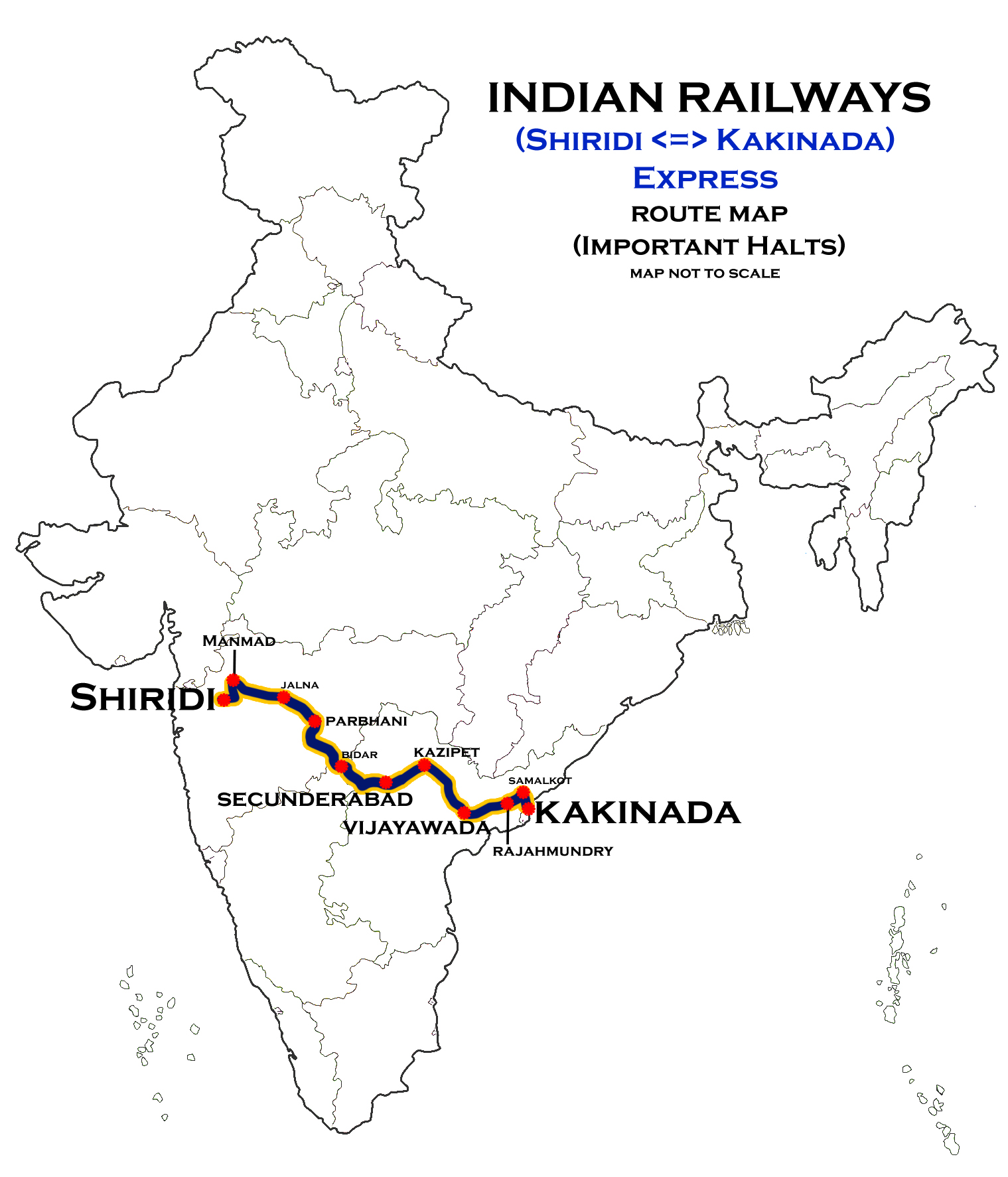

The 17205 / 17206 Kakinada Port–Sainagar Shirdi Express is an Express train belonging to South Coast Railway zone that run between Kakinada Port and Sainagar Shirdi in India.

== Service ==
It operates as train number 17205 from Sainagar Shirdi to Kakinada Port and as train number 17206 in the reverse direction serving the states of Maharashtra, Karnataka, Telangana & Andhra Pradesh. The train covers the distance of 1,339 km (832 mi) in 22 hours 22 mins approximately at a speed of (50.5 km/h (31.4 mph)).

== Coaches ==
The 17205 / 06 Kakinada Port–Sainagar Shirdi Express has one first AC coach, 3 AC 2-tier, Seven AC 3-tier, Three AC Economy Coaches, two sleeper class, two general unreserved & 2 EOG coaches. It does not carry a pantry car.

As with most train services in India, coach composition may be amended at the discretion of Indian Railways depending on demand.

== Routing ==
The 17205/17206 Kakinada Port–Sainagar Shirdi Express runs from Kakinada Port via Kakinada Town, Samalkot Junction, Rajahmundry, Eluru, Vijayawada Junction, Khammam, Mahbubabad, Warangal, Kazipet Junction, Secunderabad Junction, Lingampalli, Vikarabad Junction, Bidar, Latur Road Junction, Parli Vaijnath, Parbhani Junction, Jalna, Chhatrapati Sambhajinagar, Nagarsol, Manmad Junction, Kopargaon to Sainagar Shirdi.

== Rake sharing ==
The train shares its rake with 17203 / 17204 – Kakinada Port–Bhavnagar Terminus Express

== Traction ==
Both trains are hauled by a Vijayawada Loco Shed or Lallaguda Loco Shed-based WAP-7 electric locomotive from Kakinada Port to Sainagar Shirdi and vice versa.

== Rake reversal ==
the train reverses its direction 3 times: 1.Parli Vaijnath 2.Parbhani Junction 3.Vijayawada Junction

== Coach composition ==
| Loco | 1 | 2 | 3 | 4 | 5 | 6 | 7 | 8 | 9 | 10 | 11 | 12 | 13 | 14 | 15 | 16 | 17 | 18 | 19 | 20 | 21 |
|---|---|---|---|---|---|---|---|---|---|---|---|---|---|---|---|---|---|---|---|---|---|
| | EoG | GEN | GEN | S1 | S2 | S3 | S4 | S5 | S6 | S7 | S8 | S9 | S10 | B1 | B2 | B3 | A1 | A2 | GEN | GEN | EoG |
