= Gowthami Express =

Train in India

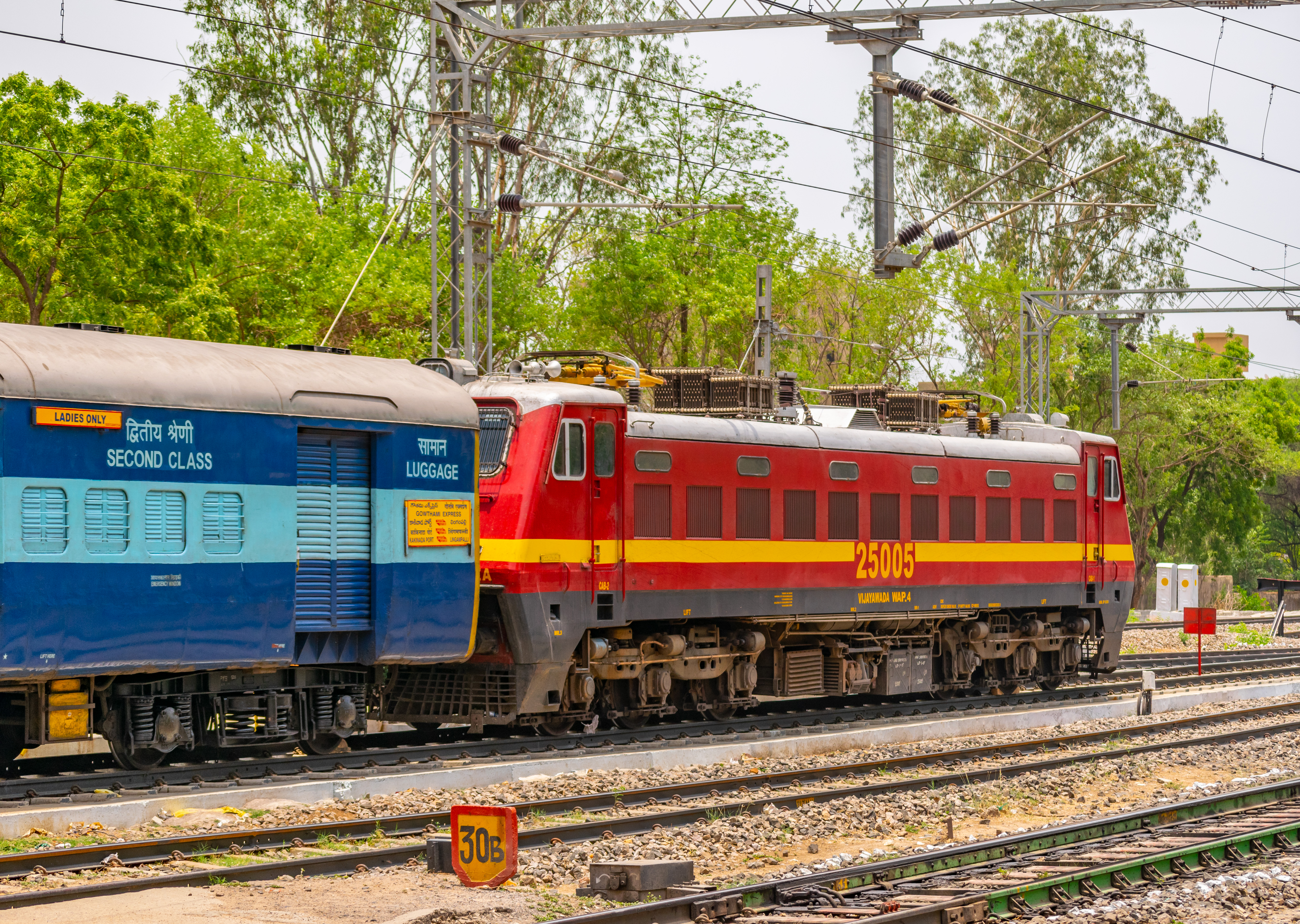
- Gowthami Express near Lingampally Railway Station spotted in 2018

Overview
- Service type: Express
- First service: 4 October 1987; 39 years ago
- Current operator: South Coast Railway

Route
- Termini: Kakinada Port (COA); Lingampalli (LPI)
- Stops: 20
- Distance travelled: 582 km (362 mi)
- Average journey time: 10 hours 55 minutes
- Service frequency: Daily
- Train number: 12737 / 12738

On-board services
- Classes: AC first, AC 2 Tier, AC 3 Tier, Sleeper Class, General Unreserved
- Seating arrangements: Yes
- Sleeping arrangements: Yes
- Catering facilities: Available
- Observation facilities: Large windows
- Baggage facilities: Below the seats

Technical
- Rolling stock: LHB coach
- Track gauge: Broad gauge (1,676 mm)
- Operating speed: 55 km/h (34 mph) average including halts
Route map
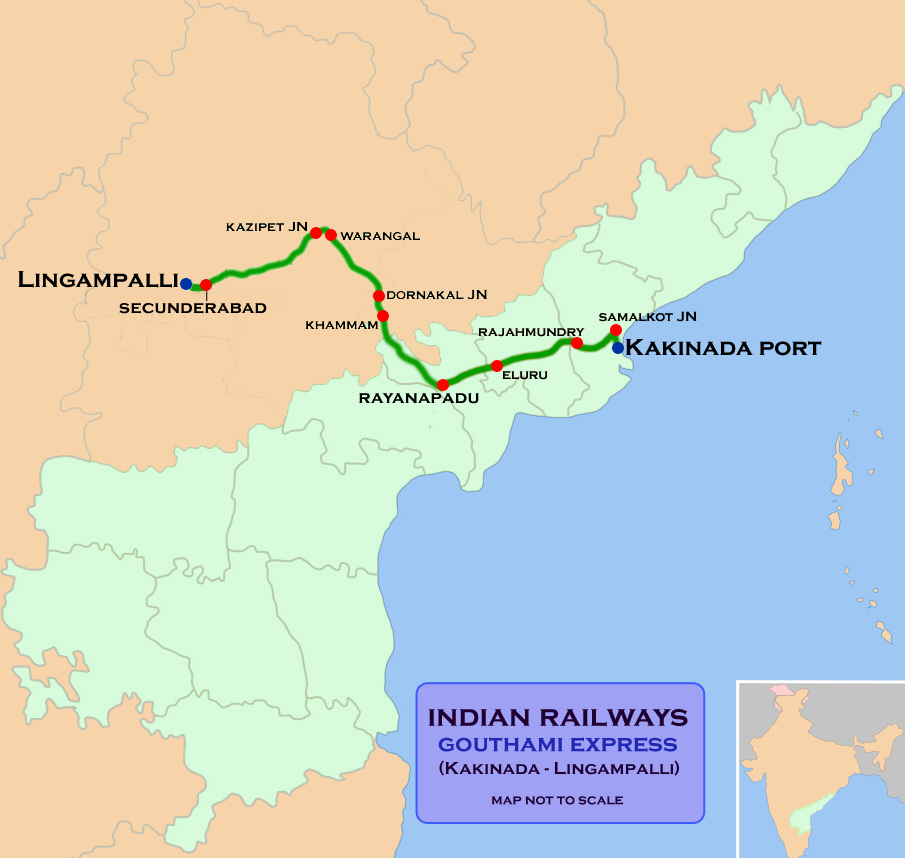

The 12737 / 12738 Gowthami Superfast Express is a superfast train running from the port city of Kakinada Port, (Andhra Pradesh) to Lingampalli, (Hyderabad, Telangana). It is named after the River Gowthami, a tributary to the River Godavari. It runs with train numbers as 12737 Up / 12738 Down.

== History ==
Gowthami Superfast Express was introduced on 3 October 1987 and is considered as a sister train to Hyderabad–Visakhapatnam Godavari Express which runs between Visakhapatnam and Hyderabad. It was considered to be one of the most prestigious trains of the South Central Railway (SCR), and connects Hyderabad with the port city Kakinada

The Gowthami Superfast Express is considered to be one of the best ways to commute to the state capital, in united Andhra Pradesh, Hyderabad from Delta districts of Andhra Pradesh. People of Kakinada, Rajahmundry, Tadepalligudem, and Eluru prefer the Gowthami Express to travel to Secunderabad. It was upgraded to superfast category in July 2007. It is operated with 12737 / 12738 as train numbers; it used to be 7047 / 7048 prior to being upgraded.

It is one of the longest trains running with 24 coaches and also runs with full capacity throughout the year. Currently, it has two first class cum second class air conditioned coaches, two second class air conditioned coaches, two third class air conditioned coaches, 13 sleeper class, three second class general compartments and two luggage cum brake vans. In total it has six air conditioned coaches. It was the first train in South Central Railway zone (before been transfer to South Coast Railway) to run with two first class cum second class air conditioned coaches. It has such a huge patronage such that a supplementary train, Cocanada AC Express, a fully air conditioned train, was introduced between Kakinada and Lingampalli in 2012 to cater to the rush. Both these trains run jam packed almost throughout the year.

The Gowthami Express was one of the longest trains operated by South Central Railway, running with 24 coaches. In the 2010s, plans were reported to increase its length to 26 coaches, which would have made it one of the longest passenger trains in the zone. The rake was also regarded as a model rake of the Vijayawada Railway Division for its maintenance standards.

Gowthami Express has been diverted from Vijayawada Junction to Rayanapadu railway station bypass from 13 April 2019 to ease bottle necks at Vijayawada Junction. Stoppage at Vijayawada junction has been officially removed from time table of the train.

== Loco links ==
earlier was WAP-4. The train is now regularly hauled by a Lallaguda Loco Shed based WAP-7 electric locomotive from Kakinada Port to Lingampalli.

== Incidents ==
In July, 2008 Gowthami Express supposedly was short-circuited and fire accident broke out during the night. Those wakened by the sounds escaped by pulling the emergency chain to slow down the train. 40 people died in this incident. It occurred while the train crossed Kesamudram station in Warangal district at around 01:07.

== See also ==
- Lingampalli railway station
- Kakinada Port railway station
