= Kakinada Port–Lokmanya Tilak Terminus Express =

Indian Railways express train

Kakinada Port–Mumbai Lokmanya Tilak Terminus Express
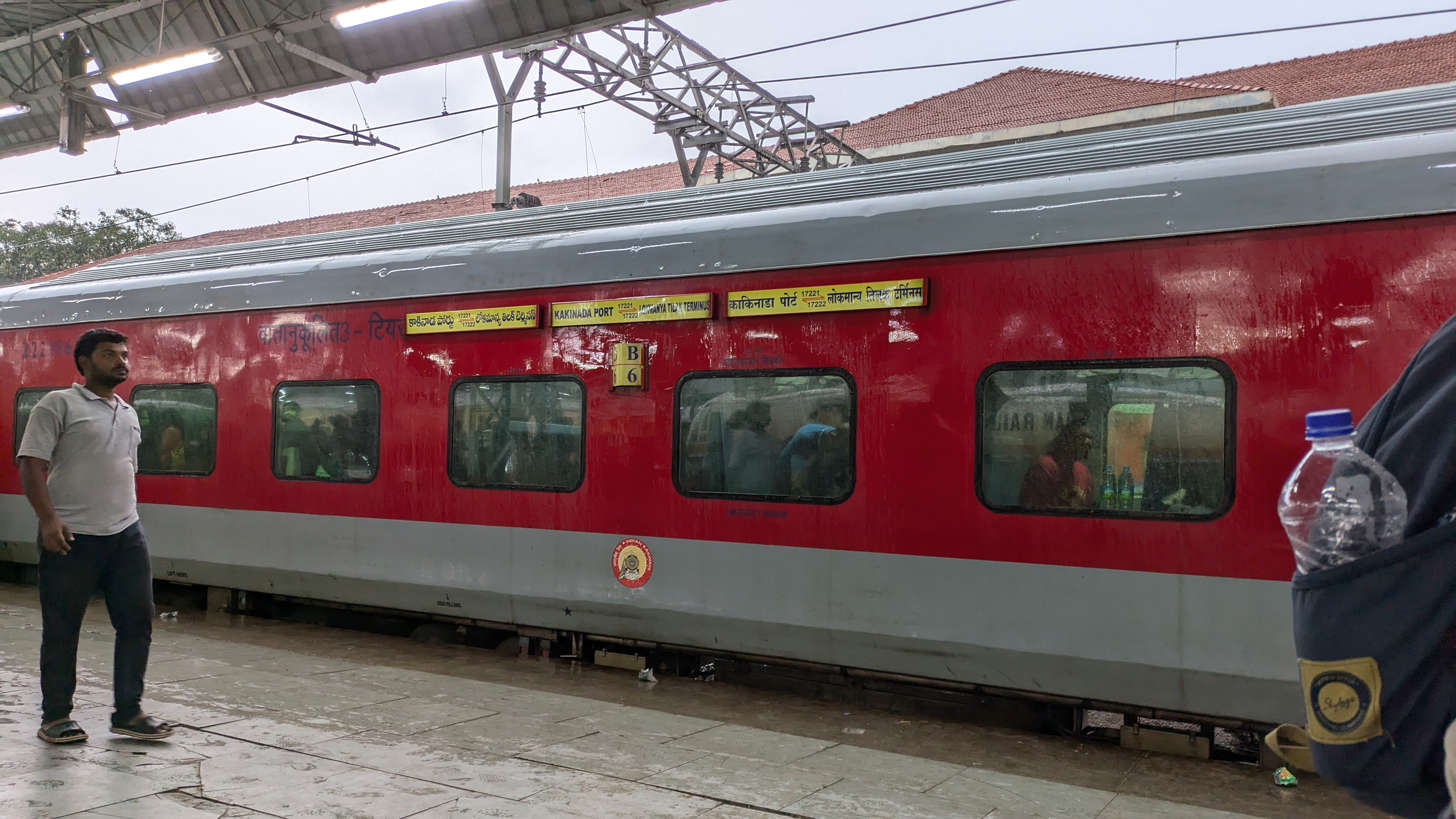

Overview
- Service type: Express
- First service: 8 February 2014; 12 years ago
- Current operator: South Coast Railway zone

Route
- Termini: Kakinada Port; Lokmanya Tilak Terminus
- Stops: 17
- Distance travelled: 1,296 km (805 mi)
- Service frequency: Bi-Weekly
- Train number: 17221 / 17222

On-board services
- Classes: general unreserved, Sleeper class, AC 2 Tier, AC 3 Tier
- Seating arrangements: Yes
- Sleeping arrangements: Yes
- Catering facilities: No

Technical
- Rolling stock: Standard Indian Railways Coaches
- Track gauge: 1,676 mm (5 ft 6 in)
- Operating speed: 50.5 km/h (31 mph)
Route map
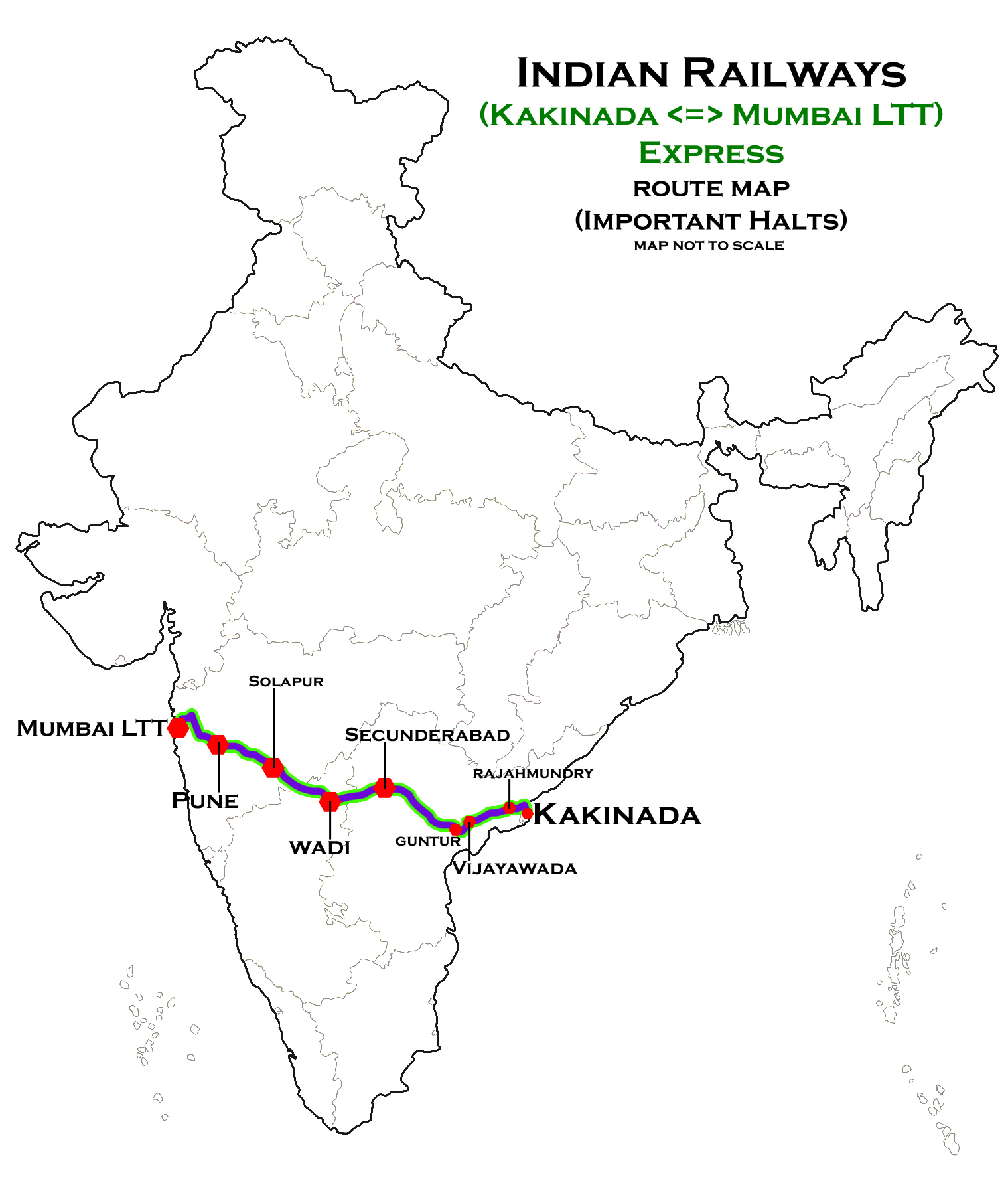

The 17221 / 22 Kakinada Port–Lokmanya Tilak Terminus Express is an Express train belonging to Indian Railways South Coast Railway zone that runs between Kakinada Port and Lokmanya Tilak Terminus in India.

It operates as train number 17221 from Kakinada Port to Lokmanya Tilak Terminus and as train number 17222 in the reverse direction serving the states of Andhra Pradesh, Telangana, Karnataka and Maharashtra.

== Coaches ==
The 17221 / 22 Kakinada Port–Lokmanya Tilak Terminus Express has two AC 2 tier, seven AC 3 tier, six sleeper class, six general unreserved and two SLR (seating with luggage rake) coaches. It does not carry a pantry car.

As is customary with most train services in India, coach composition may be amended at the discretion of Indian Railways depending on demand.

== Service ==
The 17221 Kakinada Port–Lokmanya Tilak Terminus Express covers the distance of 1,296 km (805 mi) in 26 hours 20 mins (49 km/h) and in 25 hours 05 mins as the 17222 Lokmanya Tilak Terminus–Kakinada Port Express (52 km/h).

As the average speed of the train is lower than 55 km/h (34 mph), as per railway rules, its fare doesn't includes a Superfast surcharge.

== Routing ==
The 17221 / 22 Kakinada Port–Lokmanya Tilak Terminus Express runs from Kakinada Port via Samalkot Junction, Rajahmundry, Tadepalligudem, Eluru, Vijayawada Junction, Mangalagiri, Guntur Junction, Sattenapalli, Nadikude Junction, Miriyalaguda, Nalgonda, Moula Ali, Secunderabad Junction, Lingampalli, Tandur, Wadi Junction, Gulbarga, Solapur, Pune Junction, Lonavala to Lokmanya Tilak Terminus.

== Traction ==
As the route is going to electrification, a Kalyan-based diesel locomotive WDM-3A twins, WDP-3A or WDG-4D pulls the train from Lokmanya Tilak Terminus until Secundurabad handing over to Vijayawada-based WAP-4 towards remaining part of the journey until Kakinada Port.
