= Kakinada Town–Mysuru Express =

Train in India

Overview
- Service type: Express
- Status: Active
- Locale: Andhra Pradesh, Telangana and Karnataka
- First service: 1 May 2026; 32 days ago
- Current operator: South Coast Railway (SCoR)

Route
- Termini: Kakinada Town (CCT); Mysuru Junction (MYS)
- Stops: 33
- Distance travelled: 1,393 km (866 mi)
- Average journey time: 31h 0m
- Service frequency: Bi - Weekly
- Train number: 17289 / 17290

On-board services
- Classes: General Unreserved, Sleeper Class, AC 3rd Class, AC 2nd Class, AC 1st cum 2nd Class
- Seating arrangements: Yes
- Sleeping arrangements: Yes
- Catering facilities: Pantry Car
- Observation facilities: Large windows
- Baggage facilities: No
- Other facilities: Below the seats

Technical
- Rolling stock: LHB coach
- Track gauge: 1,676 mm (5 ft 6 in)
- Electrification: 25 kV 50 Hz AC Overhead line
- Operating speed: 130 km/h (81 mph) maximum, 45 km/h (28 mph) average including halts.
- Track owner: Indian Railways
Route map
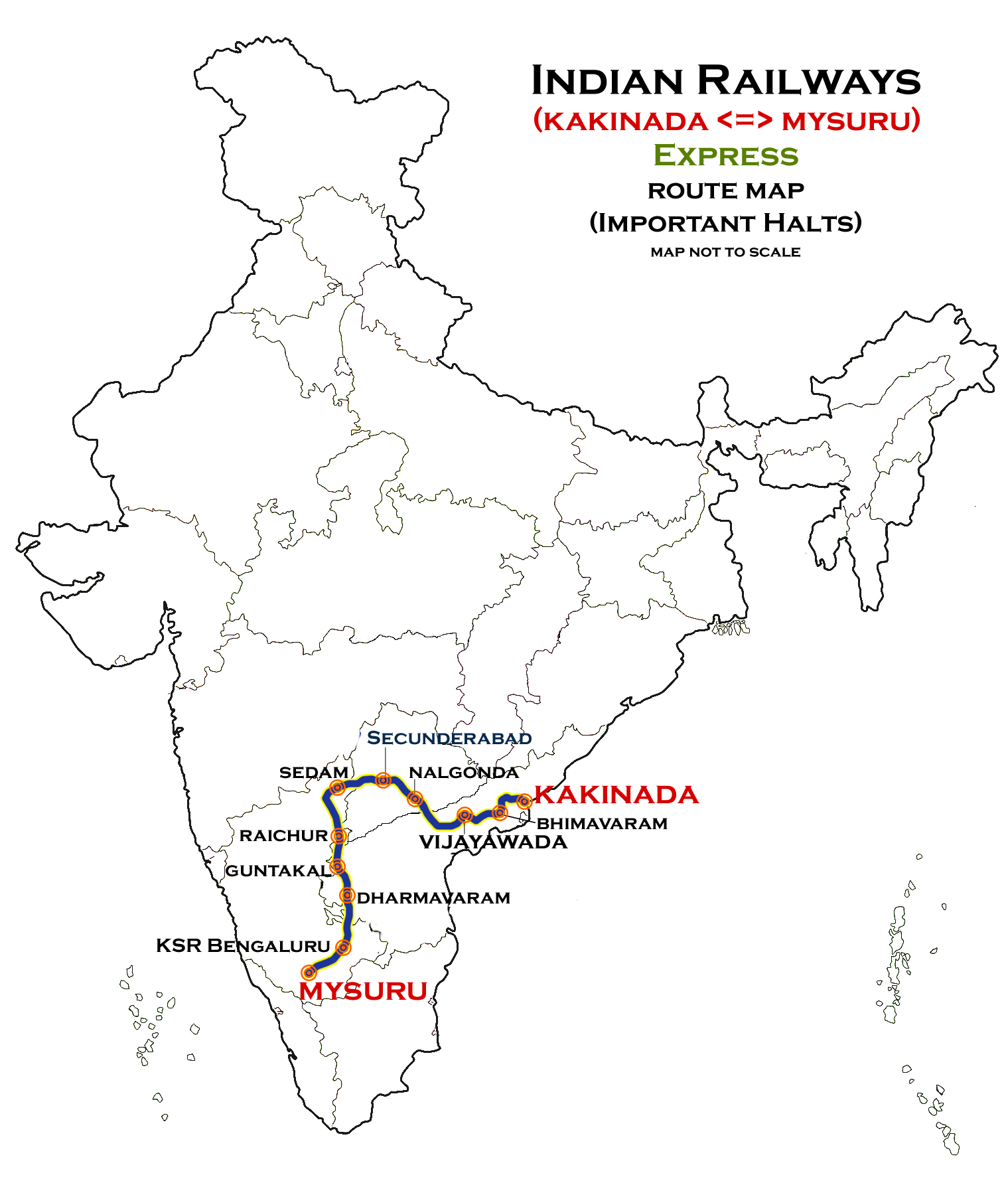

The 17289 / 17290 Kakinada Town–Mysuru Express is an express train belonging to South Coast Railway zone that runs between the city Kakinada Town of Andhra Pradesh and Mysuru Junction of Karnataka in India.

It operates as train number 17289 from Kakinada Town to Mysuru Junction and as train number 17290 in the reverse direction, serving the states of Karnataka, Telangana and Andhra Pradesh.

== Services ==
• 17289/ Kakinada Town–Mysuru Express has an average speed of 45 km/h and covers 1393 km in 31h 0m.

• 17290/ Mysuru–Kakinada Town Express has an average speed of 46 km/h and covers 1393 km in 30h 25m.

== Route and halts ==
The important halts of the train are :

- Kakinada Town
- Samalkot Junction
- Rajahmundry
- Nidadavolu Junction
- Tanuku
- Bhimavaram Town Halt
- Akividu
- Kaikaluru
- Gudivada Junction
- Vijayawada Junction
- Guntur Junction
- Nalgonda
- Secunderabad Junction
- Begumpet
- Lingampalli
- Vikarabad Junction
- Sedam
- Yadgir
- Krishna
- Raichur
- Mantralayam
- Adoni
- Guntakal Junction
- Anantapur
- Dharmavaram Junction
- Hindupur
- Yelahanka Junction
- Bengaluru Cantonment
- Bengaluru City Junction
- Kengeri
- Ramanagara
- Mandya
- Mysuru Junction

== Schedule ==
• 17289 – 9:00 am (Monday & Friday) [Kakinada Town]

• 17290 – 5:05 pm (Tuesday & Saturday) [Mysuru Junction]

== Coach composition ==
1. General Unreserved – 4
2. Sleeper Class – 10
3. AC 3rd Class – 3
4. AC 2nd Class – 3
5. AC 2nd cum 1st Class – 2

== Traction ==
As the entire route is fully electrified, it is hauled by a Vijayawada Shed-based WAP-7 electric locomotive from Kakinada Town to Mysuru Junction and vice versa.

== Rake reversal or rake share ==
No rake reversal or rake share.

== See also ==
Trains from Kakinada Town :

1. Cocanada AC Express
2. Seshadri Express

Trains from Mysuru Junction :

1. Mysuru–Thiruvananthapuram North Express
2. Chennai Central–Mysore Shatabdi Express
3. Mysuru Junction–MGR Chennai Central Vande Bharat Express
4. Mysuru Junction–Talaguppa Intercity Express
5. Wodeyar Express

== Notes ==
a. Runs 2 day in a week with both directions.
