= Kacheguda–Chengalpattu Express =

Indian Railways express train

Kacheguda -Pondicherry Express
Overview
- Service type: Express
- Locale: Telangana, Andhra Pradesh, Tamilnadu & Puducherry
- First service: 26 February 2006; 20 years ago
- Current operator: South Central Railways

Route
- Termini: Kacheguda (KCG); Pondicherry (PDY) Chengalpattu (CGL)
- Stops: 26
- Distance travelled: 969 km (602 mi)
- Average journey time: 18 Hours 5 minutes
- Service frequency: Daily )
- Train number: 17651 / 17652

On-board services
- Classes: AC 2 tier, AC 3 tier, Sleeper class, General Unreserved
- Seating arrangements: Yes
- Sleeping arrangements: Yes
- Catering facilities: On-board catering, E-catering
- Observation facilities: Yes
- Entertainment facilities: yes
- Other facilities: Below the seats

Technical
- Rolling stock: ICF coach
- Track gauge: 1,676 mm (5 ft 6 in)
- Electrification: 100%
- Operating speed: 53.11 km/h (33 mph) average including halts
Route map
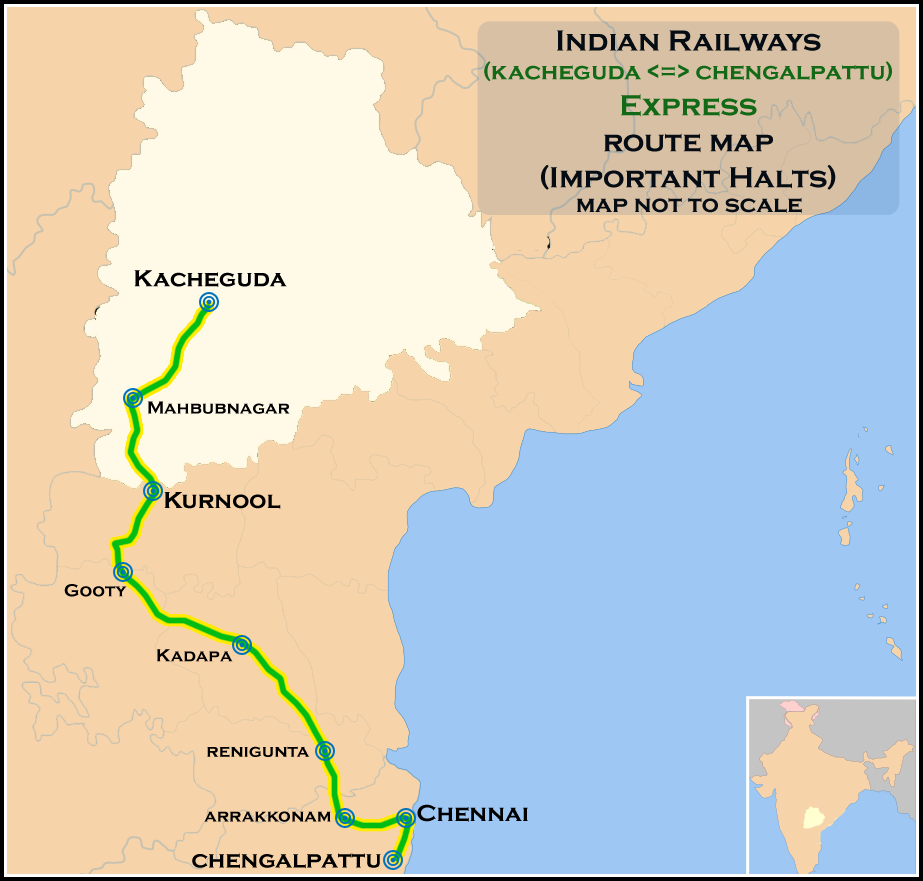

The 17651 / 17652 / 17653 / 17654 Kacheguda–Chengalpattu/Pondicherry Express is an Express train belonging to Indian Railways – South Central Railway zone that runs between Kacheguda and Pondicherry(3-days)/ Chengalpattu(4-days) in India. As the train used to run daily till Chengalpattu, the train got extended till Pondicherry from 13-03-2024 for 3-days and the other 4-days at Chengalpattu itself

It operates as train number 17652 from Kacheguda to Chengalpattu Jn and 17653 from Kacheguda to Pondicherry and as train number 17651/17654 respectively in the reverse direction, serving the states of Tamil Nadu, Telangana & Andhra Pradesh

== Coaches ==
17652 / 51 Kacheguda–Chengalpattu Jn Express presently has 2 AC 2 tier, 8 AC 3 tier, 8 Sleeper class, 2 General Unreserved & 2 SLR (Seating cum Luggage Rake) coaches. It does not have a pantry car.

As is customary with most train services in India, coach composition may be amended at the discretion of Indian Railways depending on demand

== Service ==
The 17652 Kacheguda–Chengalpattu Jn Express covers the distance of 827 kilometres in 15 hours 20 mins (54.05 km/h) and in 16 hours 20 mins as 17651 Chengalpattu Jn–Kacheguda Express (50.74 km/h).

As the average speed of the train is below 55 km/h, as per Indian Railways rules, its fare does not include a Superfast surcharge.

The train was initially introduced to run between Chennai Egmore and Secunderabad. It was later extended to operate from Tambaram and Kacheguda, with both terminals being changed. Eventually, the service was further extended to Chengalpattu, on the outskirts of the Chennai Metropolitan Area.

== Routeing ==
The 17652 / 51 Kacheguda–Chengalpattu Jn Express runs from Kacheguda via Gooty, Cuddapah, Renigunta Junction, Arakkonam Junction,Chennai Egmore , Tambaram, Chengalpattu Jn, Villupuram Junction to Puducherry.

== Traction ==
Previously, the route is partly electrified, a Gooty-based WDP-4D locomotive hauls the train from Kacheguda to Gooty Junction handing over to an Lallaguda-based WAP-7 or Vijayawada-based WAP-4 which powers the train for the remainder of the journey until Puducherry/Chengalpattu.

But now after the completion of Electrification between Kacheguda and Gooty Junction ,Lallaguda-based WAP-7 or Vijayawada-based WAP-4 is powering the train for end to end journey.

== RSA ==
17643/17644 Circar Express

== Demands ==
There are Demands to extend this train from Chengalpattu Junction to Puducherry.
