= Circar Express =

Train in India

Overview
- Service type: Express
- Locale: Puducherry, Tamil Nadu & Andhra Pradesh
- First service: 1 October 1965; 61 years ago
- Current operator: South Coast Railway

Route
- Termini: Chengalpattu (CGL) Puducherry (PDY); Kakinada Port (COA)
- Stops: 37
- Distance travelled: 17643/44 - 755KM 17655/56 - 896KM
- Average journey time: 17643/44 - 17Hrs 17655/56 - 20Hrs
- Train numbers: 17643 / 17644 - 4 Days; 17655 / 17656 - 3 Days

On-board services
- Classes: AC 2 Tier, AC 3 Tier, Sleeper Class, General Unreserved
- Seating arrangements: Yes
- Sleeping arrangements: Yes
- Catering facilities: On-board catering, E-catering
- Observation facilities: Large windows
- Baggage facilities: Available
- Other facilities: Below the seats

Technical
- Rolling stock: ICF-CBC coach
- Track gauge: 1,676 mm (5 ft 6 in)
- Operating speed: 45 km/h (28 mph) average including halts.
Route map
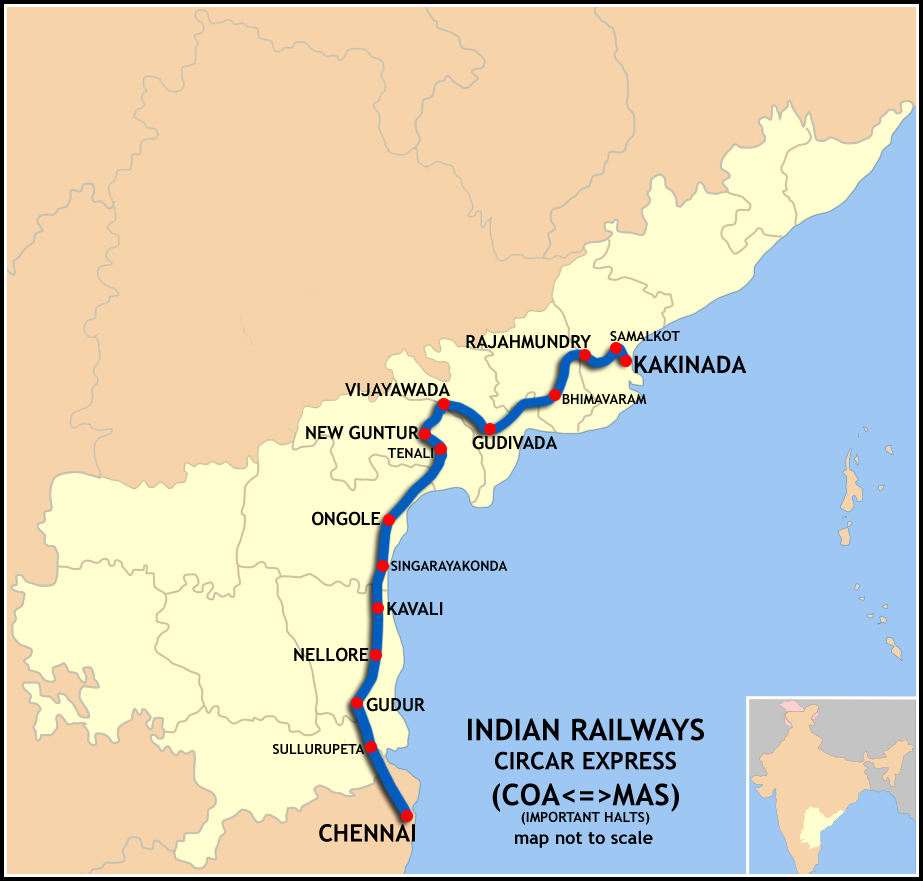

The 17643 / 17644 & 17655 / 17656 Circar Express is a daily express train run by Indian Railways from Kakinada Port to Pondicherry(3-days)/ Chengalpattu(4-days) in India. As the train used to run daily till Chengalpattu, the train got extended till Pondicherry from 13-03-2024 for 3-days and the other 4-days at Chengalpattu itself.from Chengalpattu to Kakinada Port It covers a distance of 755 km and from Puducherry to Kakinada Port. It covers a distance of 896 km.

== History ==
The Circar Express was introduced on 1 October 1965 by Indian Railways, initially operating between Kakinada Port in Andhra Pradesh and Madras (now Chennai).

In its early years, the service operated with steam locomotives and was later converted to diesel traction as part of the modernization of Indian Railways. The train originally terminated at Chennai Central, but its terminal was later shifted to Chennai Egmore following operational reorganization in the Chennai railway network.

With the electrification of railway lines along its route, the Circar Express was subsequently converted to electric traction. Over time, the service underwent changes in scheduling, halts, and operational patterns. The train was later extended to Chengalpattu Junction, and under revised operations, partial extensions were introduced toward Puducherry.

It was primarily introduced to cater to passengers from the coastal Andhra (historically known as the Circars region), especially Tanuku, Bhimavaram, Akividu, Kaikaluru, Gudivada region people to reach Chennai Egmore for education, employment, and trade work.

Later train got extended till Changalpattu on Daily basis, after a decade of demand the train has been split extended upto Puducherry for 3 days and remaining 4 days at Chengalpattu itself.

== Name ==
The train is named after the Circars region (also spelled as Circar) which historically referred to the coastal districts of present-day Andhra Pradesh during British rule.

== Locomotive ==
This train ran with diesel locomotives at the start up to the electrification of Vijayawada - Nidadavolu loop line. The train is hauled by Lallaguda Loco Shed based WAP-7 or Vijayawada Loco Shed based WAP-4 electric locomotive on its entire journey.

== Coach composition ==
- 2 AC II Tier
- 8 AC III Tier
- 8 Sleeper Class
- 2 General Coaches
- 2 SLRD Coach

Loco	1	2	3	4	5	6	7	8	9	10	11	12	13	14	15	16	17	18	19	20	21	22
	SLR	GEN	A1	A2	B8	B7	B6	B5	B4	B3	B2	B1	S8	S7	S6	S5	S4	S3	S2	S1	GEN	SLR

== Timetable ==
The Circar Express operates as train number 17643 from Chengalpattu; 17656 from Puducherry to Kakinada Port, and as train number 17655/17644 in the reverse direction from Kakinada. 17655/56 services run three days a week on Mondays, Thursdays, and Saturdays & 17643/44 services run four days a week on Sundays, Tuesdays, Wednesdays and Fridays. Both the Trains have Common Timetable and same path between Chengalpattu and Kakinada.

17656 (PDY to COA)		Station name	Station code	17655 (COA to PDY)	
Arrival	Departure	Station name	Station code	Arrival	Departure
—	13:30	Puducherry	PDY	09:50	—
14:10	14:15	Villupuram Junction	VM	09:05	09:10
15:08	15:10	Melmaruvattur	MLMR	08:03	08:05
15:48	15:50	Chengalpattu Junction	CGL	07:28	07:30
16:18	16:20	Tambaram	TBM	06:43	06:45
16:55	17:05	Chennai Egmore	MS	06:00	06:10
18:38	18:40	Gummidipundi	GPD	04:13	04:15
19:08	19:10	Sullurupeta	SPE	03:38	03:40
19:33	19:35	Nayadupeta	NYP	03:18	03:20
20:03	20:05	Gudur Junction	GDR	02:53	02:55
20:33	20:35	Nellore	NLR	02:03	02:05
20:58	21:00	Bitragunta	BTTR	01:28	01:30
21:14	21:15	Kavali	KVZ	01:13	01:15
21:53	21:55	Singarayakonda	SKM	00:43	00:45
22:18	22:20	Ongole	OGL	00:18	00:20
22:53	22:55	Vetapalemu	VTM	23:33	23:35
23:03	23:05	Chirala	CLX	23:03	23:05
23:18	23:20	Bapatla	BPP	22:43	22:45
00:03	00:05	Nidubrolu	NDO	22:23	22:25
00:23	00:25	Tenali Junction	TEL	22:03	22:05
00:59	01:00	New Guntur	NGNT	21:09	21:10
01:29	01:30	Mangalagiri	MAG	20:52	20:53
02:10	02:20	Vijayawada Junction	BZA	20:05	20:20
03:08	03:10	Gudivada Junction	GDV	18:40	18:45
03:39	03:40	Kaikaluru	KKLR	18:13	18:15
03:58	04:00	Akividu	AKVD	17:43	17:45
04:18	04:20	Bhimavaram Town	BVRT	17:15	17:20
04:38	04:40	Attili	AL	16:43	16:45
04:53	04:55	Tanuku	TNKU	16:33	16:35
05:28	05:30	Nidadavolu Junction	NDD	16:13	16:15
06:04	06:05	Godavari	GVN	—	—
06:48	06:50	Rajahmundry	RJY	15:43	15:45
07:23	07:25	Dwarapudi	DWP	15:18	15:20
07:33	07:35	Anaparti	APT	15:13	15:15
07:58	08:00	Samalkot Junction	SLO	14:53	14:55
08:28	08:30	Kakinada Town	CCT	14:35	14:40
09:25	—	Kakinada Port	COA	—	14:30

== Rake sharing ==
This train has rake sharing with 17651 / 17652 Kacheguda-Puducherry Express; 17651 / 17652 Kacheguda-Chengalpattu Express and it has rake sharing with 17655/17656 Circar Express

== Average speed and frequency ==
The train runs at an average speed of 45 km/h. It runs on a daily basis.

Train no 17643/44 runs from Kakinada Port to Chengalpattu Junction on Tuesday, Wednesday, Friday, Sunday and from Chengalpattu Junction to Kakinada Port on Tuesday, Wednesday, Friday, Sunday.

Train no 17655/56 runs from Kakinada Port to Puducherry on Monday, Thursday, Saturday and from Puducherry to Kakinada Port on Monday, Thursday, Saturday.

== Demands ==
As per demands, this train is extended from Chengalpattu Junction to Puducherry on tri-weekly basis from 13 March 2024.
