= Bidar–Machilipatnam Express =

Train in India

Bidar-Machilipatnam Super Fast Express

Overview
- Service type: Superfast Express
- Locale: Karnataka, Telangana & Andhra Pradesh
- First service: 31 August 1999; 27 years ago
- Current operator: South Coast Railway

Route
- Termini: Bidar (BIDR); Machilipatnam (MTM)
- Stops: 15
- Distance travelled: 594 km (369 mi)
- Average journey time: 10 hrs 48 minutes
- Service frequency: Daily
- Train number: 12749 / 12750

On-board services
- Classes: AC First Class, AC 2 Tier, AC 3 Tier, Sleeper Class, General Unreserved
- Seating arrangements: Yes
- Sleeping arrangements: Yes
- Catering facilities: No pantry car
- Observation facilities: Large windows
- Baggage facilities: No
- Other facilities: Below the seats

Technical
- Rolling stock: LHB coach
- Track gauge: Broad Gauge
- Operating speed: 55 km/h (34 mph) average including halts.
Route map
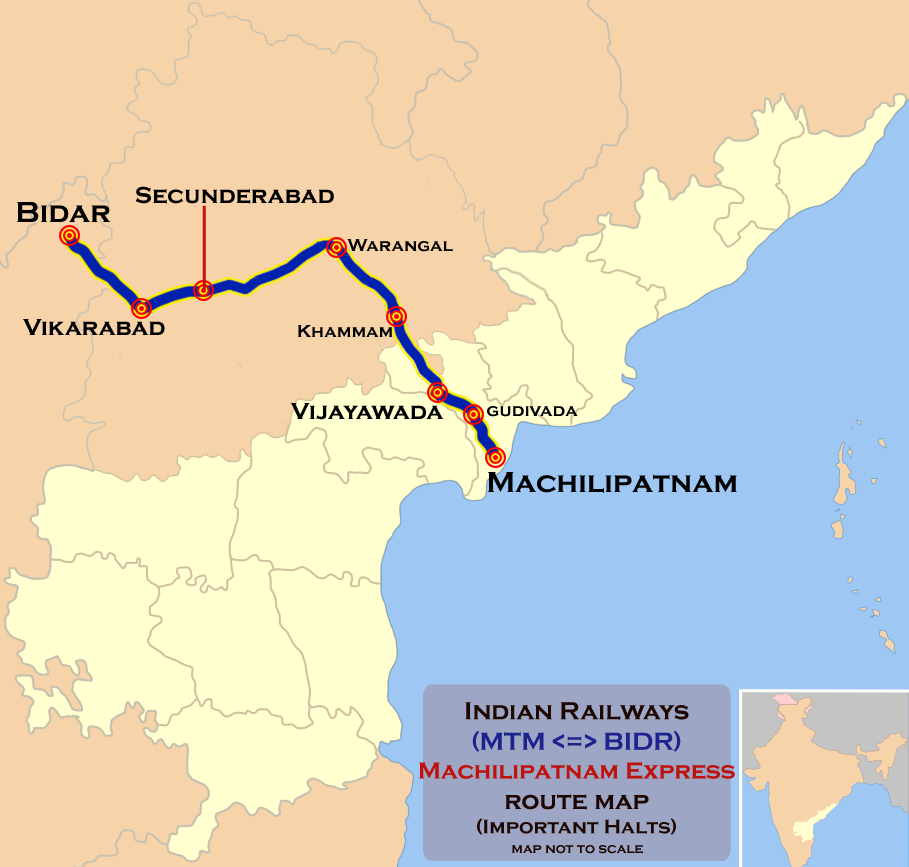

The 12749 / 12750 Bidar-Machilipatnam Express is a Superfast Express train operated between Bidar and Machilipatnam. It belongs to South Central Railway of Indian Railways. The train was introduced on 31 August 1999 between Secunderabad and Machilipatnam. It takes 10 hours 58 minutes to cover 594 km (369 mi) between its nodal stations.

== Route ==
This train runs via Secunderabad, Warangal, Vijayawada and Gudivada The table shows the list of stations between the two nodal stations. The train was extended up to Bidar from 1 March 2018. From 2022, the route has been electrified till Bidar and operational. A WAP7 or WAP4 is used to haul this Superfast express 12749/50 from BIDAR to MACHELIPATNAM and back.

S.No.	Station Name	Forward Arrival	Backward Arrival
1	Bidar	19:35 (Origin)	(07:38) Last Stop
2	Zahirabad	19:59	
3	Vikarabad Junction	20:44	
4	Lingampally	21:29	
5	Secunderabad	22:10 (5 Min Stop)	
6	Jangaon	23:19	
7	Kazipet	00:15	
8	Warangal	00:38	
9	Mahbubabad	01:29	
10	Khammam	02:09	
11	Madhira	02:54	
12	Kondapalli	03:34	
13	Vijayawada	04:25 (15 Mins Stop)	
14	Gudivada Junction	05:04	
15	Gudlavalleru	05:19	
16	Pedana	05:34	
17	Machilipatnam	06:20 (Last Stop)	20:50 (Origin)
