= Rayalaseema Express =

Train in India

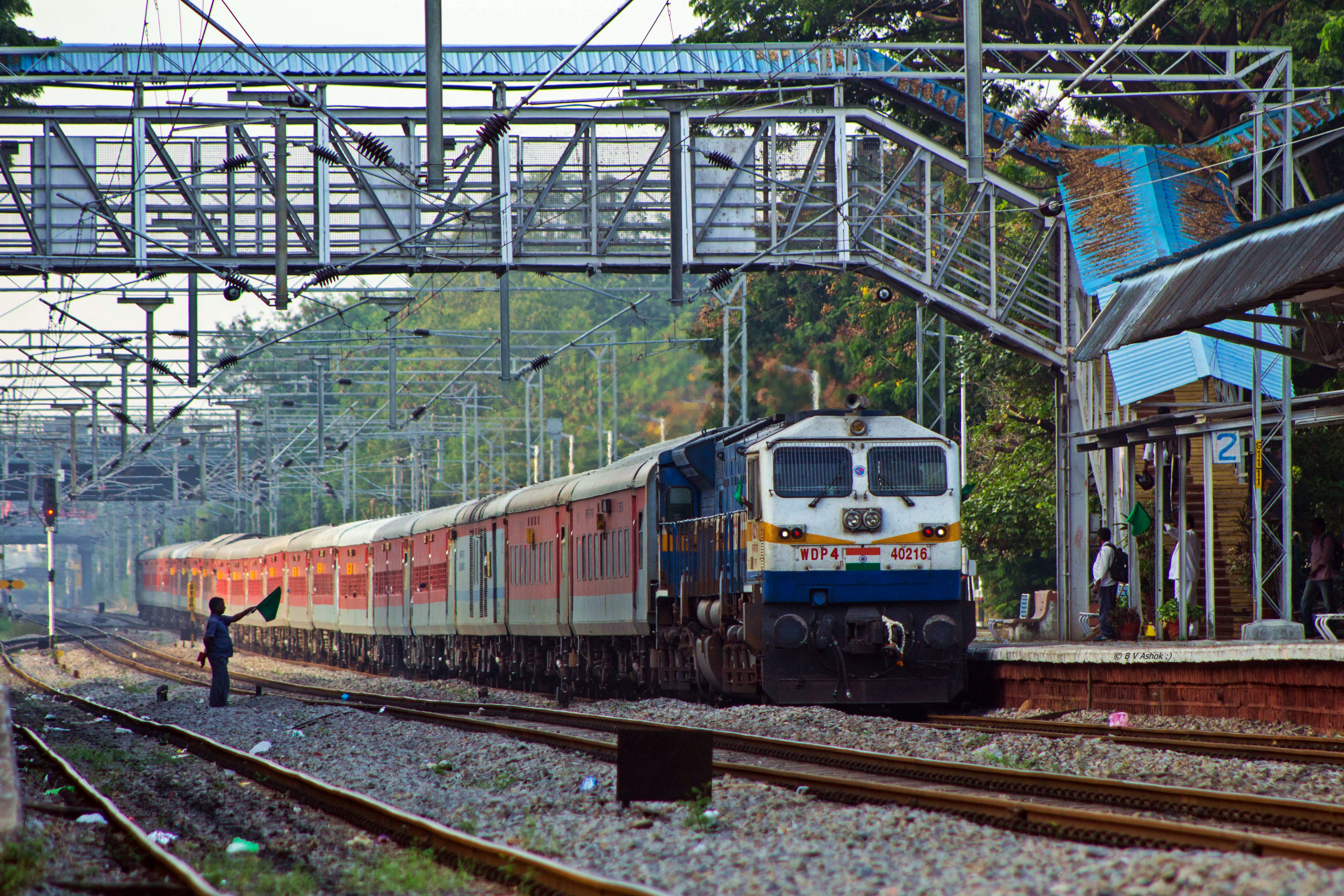
- Rayalaseema Express cruising through Cavalry Barracks spotted in 2017

Overview
- Service type: Superfast
- Locale: Andhra Pradesh, Karnataka & Telangana
- First service: 2 October 1977; 48 years ago
- Current operator: South Coast Railways

Route
- Termini: Tirupati (TPTY); Nizamabad (NZB)
- Stops: 35
- Distance travelled: 893 km (555 mi)
- Average journey time: 16 hours 13 mins
- Service frequency: Daily
- Train number: 12793 / 12794

On-board services
- Classes: AC 2 Tier, AC 3 Tier, AC 3 Tier Economy, Sleeper class, General Unreserved
- Seating arrangements: Yes
- Sleeping arrangements: Yes
- Catering facilities: On-board catering, E-catering
- Observation facilities: Large windows
- Baggage facilities: Below the seats

Technical
- Rolling stock: LHB coach
- Track gauge: Broad gauge (1,676 mm)
- Operating speed: 55 km/h (34 mph) average with halts
Route map
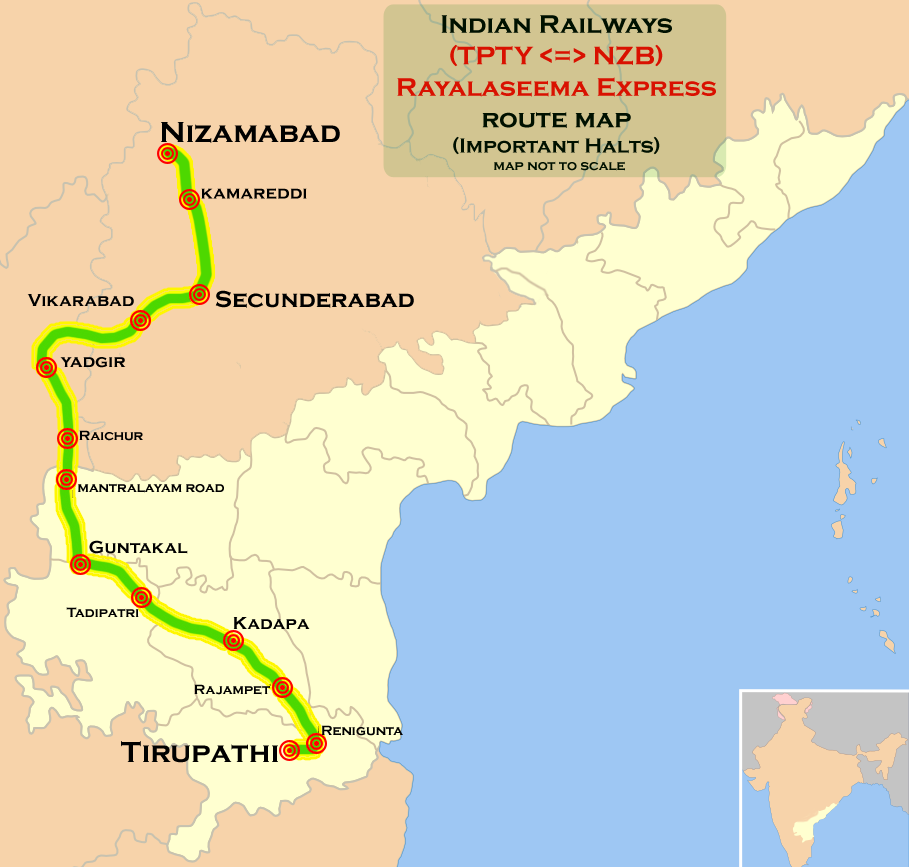

The 12793 / 12794 Rayalaseema Express is a daily overnight Superfast Express train belonging to Indian Railways, that used to run between Tirupati and Hyderabad but is now extended up to Nizamabad Junction.

== Service ==
The train was numbered 17429 for Hyderabad to Tirupati journey and 17430 for the return journey. After 1 November 2017, the train has been converted into a superfast train under "Mission Raftaar" scheme of Indian Railways and extended up to Nizamabad with new numbers 12793 for Tirupati to Nizamabad journey and 12794 for the return.

== Nomenclature ==
The train is named after the region of Rayalaseema in the state of Andhra Pradesh as it connects the Hindu pilgrimage center Tirupati with Nizamabad, and the Telangana state capital of Hyderabad covering all the four districts of Rayalaseema (Chittoor, Kadapa, Anantapur and Kurnool).

== Time Table ==
| Station Code | Station name | Arrival | Departure |
|---|---|---|---|
| TPTY | Tirupati | --- | 17:30 |
| RU | Renigunta Junction | 17:44 | 17:45 |
| KOU | Koduru | 18:23 | 18:25 |
| RJP | Razampeta | 18:49 | 18:50 |
| HX | Kadapa Junction | 19:38 | 19:40 |
| YA | Yerraguntla Junction | 20:14 | 20:15 |
| MOO | Muddanuru | 20:29 | 20:30 |
| TU | Tadipatri | 21:14 | 21:15 |
| GY | Gooty Junction | 21:59 | 22:00 |
| GTL | Guntakal Junction | 22:25 | 22:30 |
| AD | Adoni | 23:18 | 23:20 |
| MALM | Mantralayam Road | 23:54 | 23:55 |
| RC | Raichur Junction | 00:28 | 00:30 |
| YG | Yadagiri | 01:24 | 01:25 |
| CT | Chittrapura | 02:20 | 02:21 |
| SEM | Sedam | 02:39 | 02:40 |
| TDU | Tanduru | 03:10 | 03:11 |
| VKB | Vikarabad Junction | 04:03 | 04:05 |
| SKP | Shankarpalli | 04:25 | 04:26 |
| LPI | Lingamapalli | 04:45 | 04:47 |
| SNF | Sanathnagar | 05:01 | 05:02 |
| BMT | Begumpet | 05:16 | 05:17 |
| SC | Secunderabad Junction | 05:55 | 06:15 |
| KMC | Kamareddi | 08:09 | 08:10 |
| NZB | Nizamabad Junction | 09:25 | --- |

== Traction ==
It is hauled by a Lallaguda Loco Shed-based WAP-7 electric locomotive from Tirupati to Nizamabad and vice-versa.
