= New Guntur railway station =

Railway station in Andhra Pradesh, India

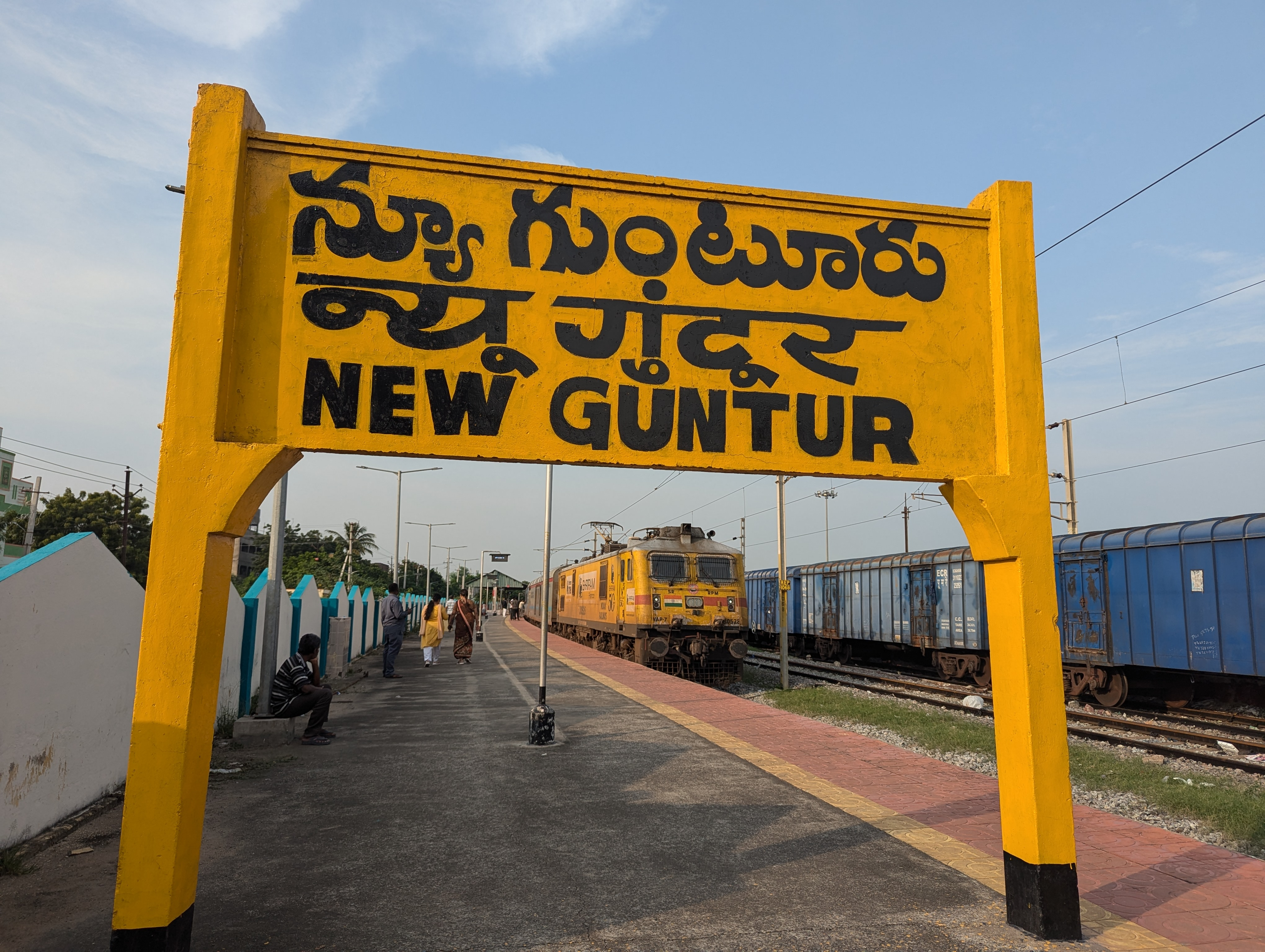

General information
- Location: Nehru Nagar, Guntur City, New Guntur; India
- Coordinates: 16°31′06″N 80°37′07″E
- System: Indian Railways station
- Owner: Indian Railways
- Operator: South Coast Railway zone
- Lines: Guntur–Krishna Canal section Guntur–Tenali section
- Platforms: 1
- Tracks: 5

Construction
- Structure type: Standard (on-ground station)
- Parking: Yes
- Cycle facilities: NA
- Accessible: Disabled access

Other information
- Status: Active
- Station code: NGNT
- Zone(s): South Coast Railway zone
- Division(s): Guntur Railway division
- Fare zone: Indian Railways
Location
- Location within Andhra Pradesh Location within India

New Guntur railway station (station code:NGNT), is located at Nehru Nagar area of the city of Guntur in the Indian state of Andhra Pradesh. It is under the administration of Guntur railway division of South Central Railway zone. It is the second railway station, alongside the main station of Guntur in the city.

== Classification ==
It is classified as an E–category station and is administered under Guntur railway division of South Central Railway zone. It is located on Krishna Canal–Guntur section and also categorised as an Adarsh station of the division.

== Heritage crane ==
The station houses a 35T steam crane of Guntakal railway division as a Heritage Rolling Stock.

== Notable trains ==
The following are some of the notable Superfast Express, Express trains halting at the station.

Train name	Type	End points
Visakhapatnam–Tirupati Double Decker Express	Double Decker Express	Tirupati−Visakhapatnam Junction
Chennai Central–Vijayawada Jan Shatabdi Express	Jan Shatabdi Express	Vijayawada−Chennai Central
Andaman Express	Express	Shri Mata Vaishno Devi Katra railway station–Chennai Central
Circar Express	Express	Kakinada Port−Chengalpattu Junction
Lucknow Express	Express	Chennai–Lucknow
Visakhapatnam–Chennai Central Express	Superfast Express	Chennai–Visakhapatnam

== See also ==
- List of railway stations in India

Preceding station	Indian Railways	Following station
Manipuram Halt towards ?	South Central Railway zone Vijayawada–Chennai section of Howrah–Chennai main line	Resauli towards ?
