= Cocanada AC Express =

Train service in India

Cocanada Superfast Express
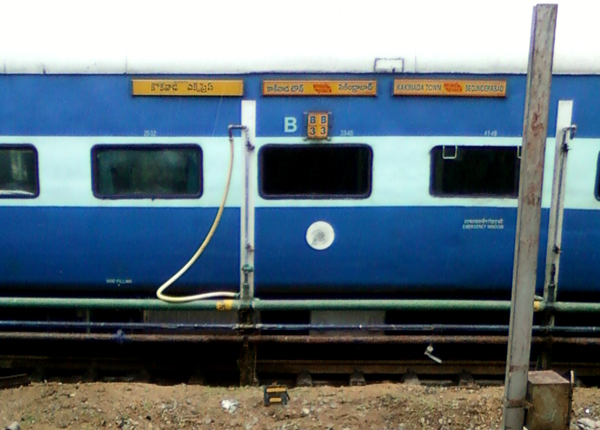

Overview
- Service type: Superfast Express
- Status: Operating
- Locale: Andhra Pradesh, Telangana
- First service: 10 December 2012; 13 years ago
- Current operator: South Coast Railways

Route
- Termini: Kakinada; Lingampalli
- Stops: 15
- Distance travelled: 608 km (378 mi)
- Average journey time: 11 hours 5 minutes
- Service frequency: Daily

On-board services
- Classes: General Unreserved, Sleeper, Third AC, Third AC Economy, Second AC, First AC
- Disabled access: -
- Sleeping arrangements: Yes
- Catering facilities: Onboard catering
- Observation facilities: Large windows
- Baggage facilities: Below the seats

Technical
- Rolling stock: LHB coach
- Track gauge: Broad (1,676 mm)
Route map
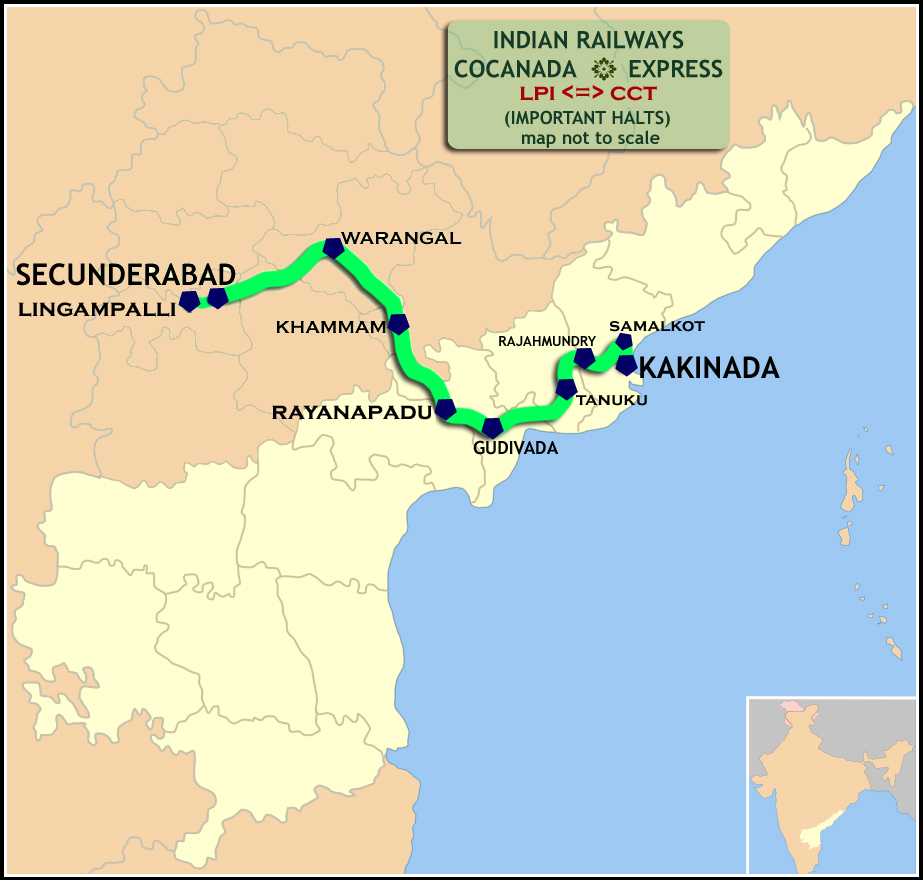

The Cocanada Superfast Express is a daily superfast express train belonging to South Coast Railway zone which connects Kakinada Town and Lingampalli.

It operates as train number 12775 from Kakinada Town to Lingampalli and as train number 12776 in the reverse direction, serving the states of Andhra Pradesh and Telangana.

== Loco ==
From Kakinada Town to Lingampalli, it is hauled by WAP-7 of Royapuram shed.

== Routeing ==
The 12775/ 12776 Cocanada AC Express runs from Kakinada Town via Rajahmundry, Tanuku, Bhimavaram Town, Akividu, Kaikaluru, Gudivada Junction, Rayanapadu*, Khammam, Warangal, Secunderabad, Begumpet, Lingampalli.

This train is permanently diverted to stop at Rayanapadu because of heavy traffic at Vijayawada Junction.

== Timetable ==
12775 starts from Kakinada Town every day at 20:20 hrs IST and reaches Lingampalli the next day at 7:30 AM.

12776 starts from Lingampalli every day at 19:00 hrs IST and reaches Kakinada Town the next day at 6:03 AM.

== Coach composition ==
- 1 AC I Tier
- 3 AC II Tier
- 4 AC III Tier
- 3 AC Economy
- 5 Sleeper Class
- 4 General Coaches
- 1 SLRD Coach

Loco	1	2	3	4	5	6	7	8	9	10	11	12	13	14	15	16	17	18	19	20	21	22
	SLR	GEN	GEN	S1	S2	S3	S4	S5	M1	M2	M3	B1	B2	B3	B4	A1	A2	A3	H1	GEN	GEN	HOG
