= Kakinada Port railway station =

Railway station in Andhra Pradesh, India

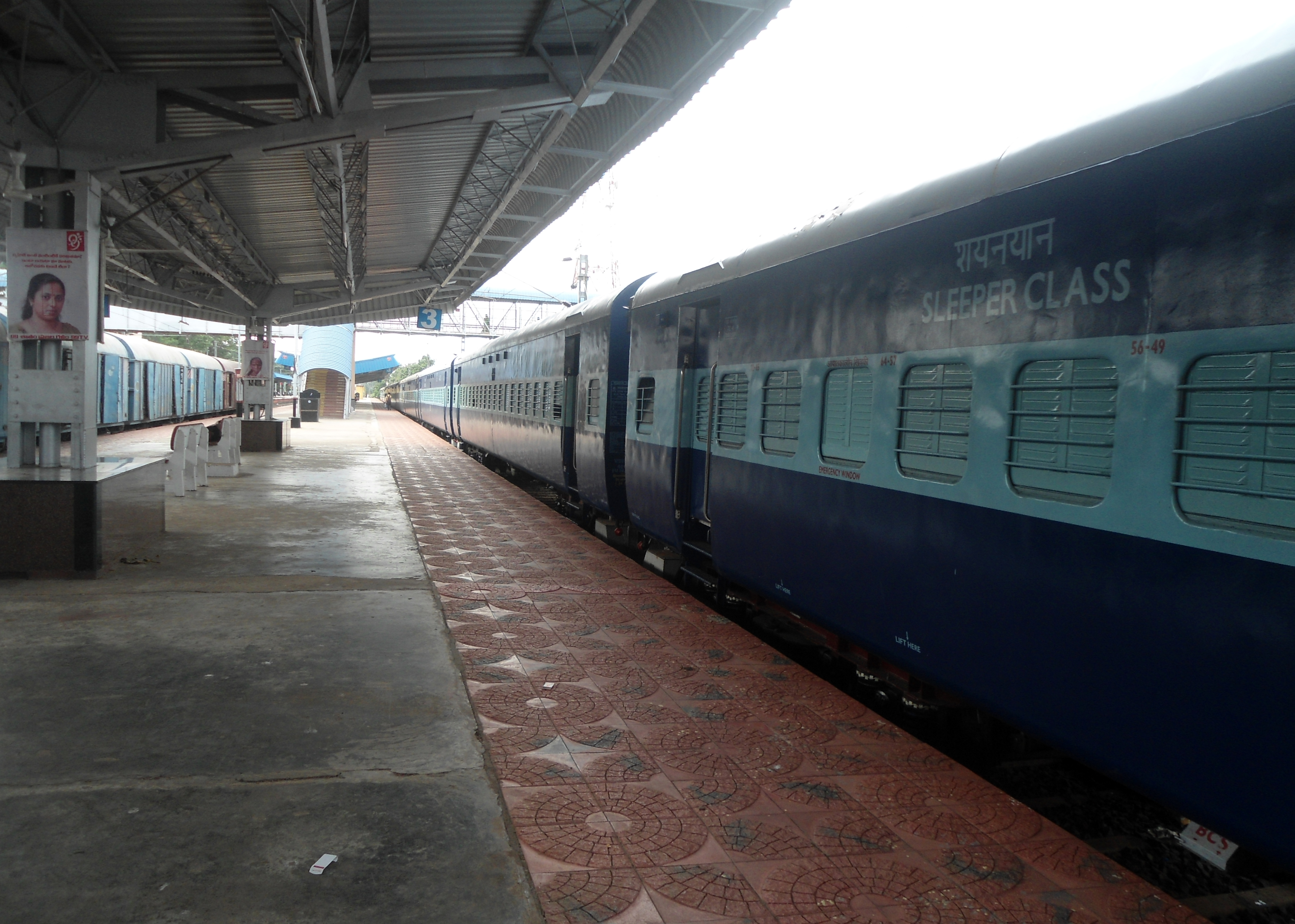
- Coconada Railway Station

General information
- Location: Kakinada, Andhra Pradesh; India
- Coordinates: 16°57′21″N 82°14′26″E
- Elevation: 9 m (30 ft)
- System: Indian Railways station
- Line: Samalkot–Kakinada branch line
- Platforms: 3
- Tracks: 5 ft 6 in (1,676 mm) broad gauge
- Connections: -

Construction
- Structure type: Standard (on-ground station)
- Parking: Available
- Cycle facilities: Not available

Other information
- Status: Functioning
- Station code: COA
- Zone(s): South Coast Railway
- Division(s): Vijayawada

History
- Opened: 1882; 144 years ago
- Rebuilt: 2009/2012
- Former names: Coconada Port

Passengers
- 2 Million: 10,0000 ▲205%
Location
- Location within Andhra Pradesh Location within India
- Interactive map

Kakinada Port railway station (station code:COA) is an Indian Railways station in Kakinada of Kakinada district in the Indian state of Andhra Pradesh. It lies on the Samalkot–Kakinada Port branch line, a branch line of Howrah–Chennai main line and is administered under Vijayawada railway division of South Coast Railway zone (formerly South Central Railway zone).

== History ==
Kakinada Port railway station was initially constructed in the year 1882 and new Kakinada Port railway station (Present Station) was built at a cost of ₹5 crore (US$530,000) and was opened on 26 December 2011. Old port station was being used for goods & other transport activities.

== Classification ==
In terms of earnings and outward passengers handled, Kakinada Port is categorized as a Non-Suburban Grade-4 (NSG-4) railway station. Based on the re–categorization of Indian Railway stations for the period of 2017–18 and 2022–23, an NSG–4 category station earns between ₹10–₹20 crore and handles 2–5 million passengers.

== Originating express trains ==
Also see - Trains originating from Kakinada Town

Train No.	Train Name	Destination	Departure	Running	Route
17206	Sainagar Shirdi Express	Sainagar Shirdi	05:05	Mon, Wed, Sat	Samalkot Jn., Rajamundry., Tadepalligudem., Vijayawada Jn., Kazipet Jn., Secunderabad Jn., Vikarabad Jn., Bidar., Aurangabad., Nagarsol., Manmad Jn.
12755	Bhavnagar Terminus Express	Bhavnagar Terminus	05:45	Thu	Samalkot Jn., Rajamundry., Vijayawada Jn., Guntur Jn., Nalgonda., Secunderabad Jn., Vikarabad Jn., Kalaburagi., Solapur Jn., Pune Jn.,Vasai Road., Surat., Vadodara Jn., Ahmedabad Jn.
17221	Lokmanya Tilak Terminus Express	Lokmanya Tilak Terminus	09:00	Wed, Sat	Samalkot Jn., Rajahmundry., Tadepalligudem., Eluru., Vijayawada Jn., Guntur Jn., Nalgonda., Secunderabad Jn., Kalaburagi., Solapur Jn., Pune Jn.
17644	Circar Express	Chengalpattu Junction	14:30	Sun, Tue, Wed, Fri	Samalkot Jn., Rajamundry., Nidadavolu Jn., Bhimavaram Town., Gudivada Jn., Vijayawada Jn., New Guntur., Tenali Jn., Ongole., Nellore., Gudur Jn., Chennai Egmore., Tambaram.
17655	Circar Express	Puducherry	14:30	Mon, Thu, Sat	Samalkot Jn., Rajamundry., Nidadavolu Jn., Bhimavaram Town., Gudivada Jn., Vijayawada Jn., New Guntur., Tenali Jn., Ongole., Nellore, Gudur Jn., Chennai Egmore., Tambaram., Chengalpattu Jn., Villupuram Jn.
12737	Gowthami Express	Lingampalli	19:15	All Days	Samalkot Jn., Rajamundry., Tadepalligudem., Eluru., Rayanapadu., Kazipet Jn., Secunderabad Jn.

== Station amenities ==
It is one of the 38 stations in the division to be equipped with Automatic Ticket Vending Machines (ATVMs).

Preceding station	Indian Railways	Following station
Kakinada Town towards ?	South Central Railway zone Samalkot–Kakinada branch line	Terminus
