= Samalkot–Kakinada Port branch line =

Railway line in Andhra Pradesh, India

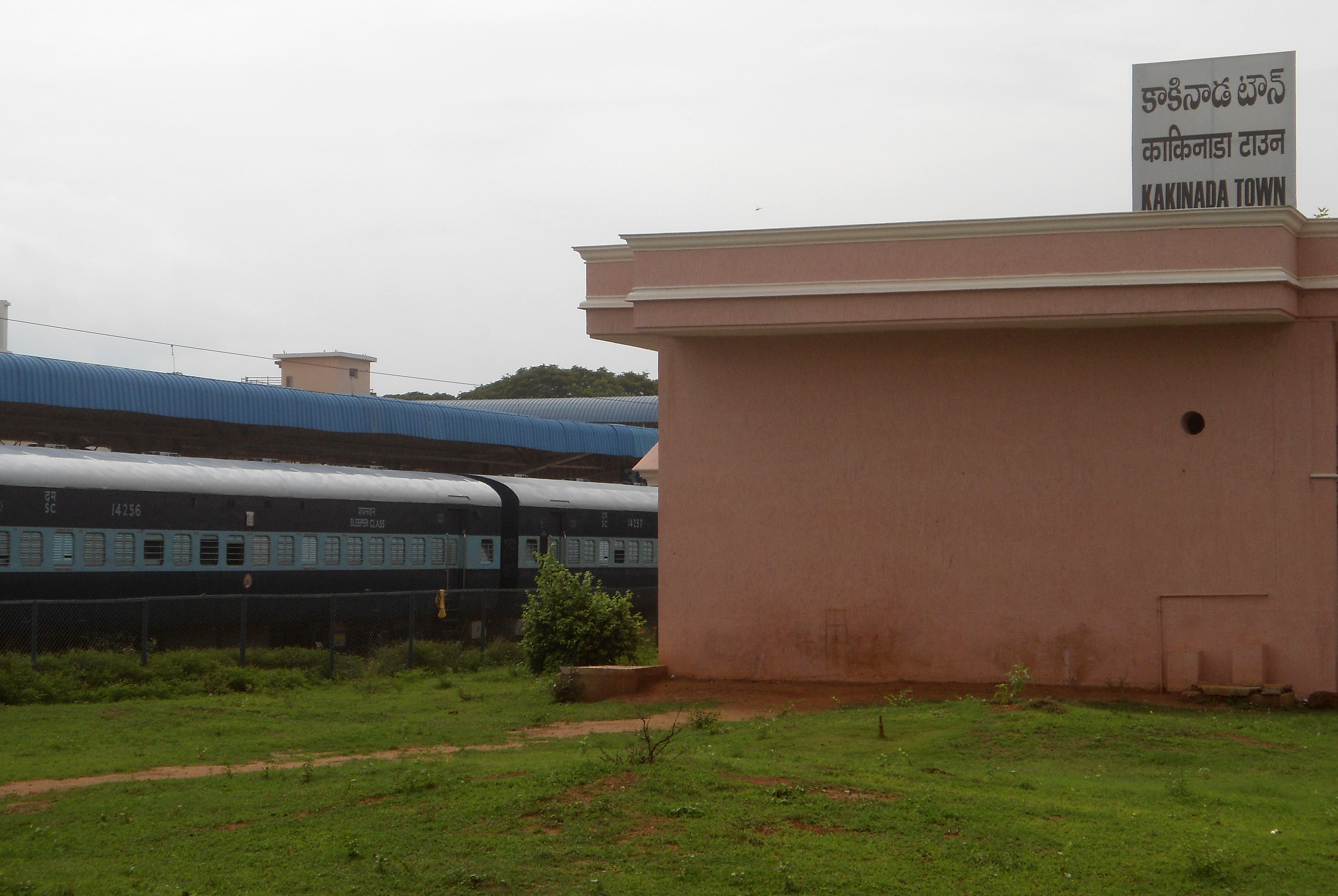
- Kakinada Town railway station lies on the Samalkot–Kakinada Port branch line

Overview
- Status: Operational
- Owner: Indian Railways
- Locale: Andhra Pradesh
- Termini: Samalkot; Kakinada Port

Service
- Operator(s): South Coast Railway

Technical
- Line length: 15.60 km (9.69 mi)
- Track gauge: 5 ft 6 in (1,676 mm) broad gauge
- Electrification: Yes
- Operating speed: 50 km/h

The Samalkot–Kakinada Port branch line is a railway line connecting Samalkot and Kakinada Port of Kakinada district in the Indian state of Andhra Pradesh. Further, this section intersects Vijayawada–Nidadavolu loop line at Samalkot.

== Jurisdiction ==
The branch line is an electrified double-track railway line. It is under the administrative jurisdiction of Vijayawada railway division of South Coast Railway zone with a length of 15.60 km (9.69 mi).
