= Kakinada Town railway station =

Railway Station in Andhra Pradesh

Kakinada Town
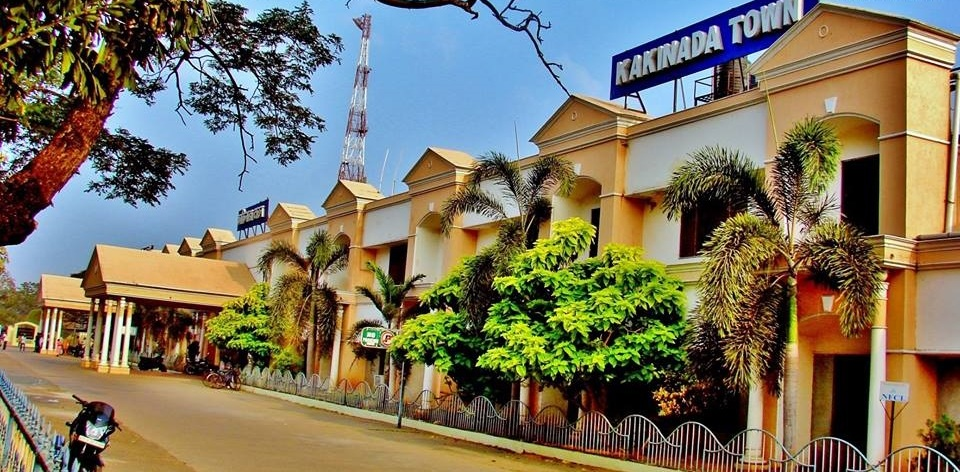
- Entrance of Kakinada City Junction train station

General information
- Location: Valemuri Vari Veedhi, Rama Rao Peta, Kakinada, East Godavari, Andhra Pradesh; India
- Coordinates: 16.9672919°N 82.2329441°E
- System: Commuter, Inter-city and Regional rail station
- Owner: Indian Railways
- Operator: Indian Railways
- Lines: Howrah–Chennai main line; Samalkot–Kakinada Port branch line
- Platforms: 4
- Tracks: 8 5 ft 6 in (1,676 mm) broad gauge

Construction
- Structure type: Standard (on ground)
- Accessible: Disabled access

Other information
- Status: Active
- Station code: CCT
- Zone(s): SCoR
- Division(s): Vijayawada
- Classification: Non-Suburban Grade-3 (NSG-3)

History
- Opened: 1893

Services
Preceding station	Indian Railways	Following station
Sarpavaram towards ?	South Coast Railway zone Vijayawada–Chennai section of Howrah–Chennai main line	Kakinada Port towards ?
Route map
Location
- Location within India Location within Andhra Pradesh
- Interactive map

Kakinada Town railway station (station code:CCT) is an Indian Railways station in Kakinada of Andhra Pradesh. It lies on Samalkot–Kakinada Port branch line of Howrah–Chennai main line and is administered under Vijayawada railway division of South Coast Railway zone (formerly South Central Railway zone).

== Classification ==
In terms of earnings and outward passengers handled, Kakinada Town is categorized as a Non-Suburban Grade-3 (NSG-3) railway station. Based on the re–categorization of Indian Railway stations for the period of 2017–18 and 2022–23, an NSG–3 category station earns between ₹20–₹100 crore and handles 5–10 million passengers.

The station has been selected for the Adarsh Station Scheme, a scheme for upgradation of stations by the Indian Railways.

== Originating express trains ==
Train No.	Train Name	Destination	Departure	Running	Route
17295	Hisar Weekly Express	Hisar Jn	05:40	Tue	Samalkot Jn., Rajamundry., Vijayawada Jn., Guntur Jn., Charlapalli., Nizamabad Jn., Nanded., Akola Jn., Vadodara Jn., Ajmer Jn.
17289	Mysuru Express	Mysuru Jn	09:00	Mon, Fri	Samalkot Jn., Rajamundry., Nidadavolu Jn., Bhimavaram Town., Gudivada Jn., Vijayawada Jn., Guntur Jn., Secundrabad Jn., Lingampalli., Raichur Jn., Guntakal Jn., KSR Bengaluru City Jn.
17250	Tirupati Express	Tirupati	15:15	All Days	Samalkot Jn., Rajamundry., Nidadavolu Jn., Tadepalligudem., Eluru, Vijayawada Jn., Tenali Jn., Ongole., Nellore., Sri Kalahasti, Renigunta Jn.
17210	Seshadri Express	SMVT Bengaluru	17:25	All Days	Samalkot Jn., Rajamundry., Nidadavolu Jn., Bhimavaram Town., Gudivada Jn., Vijayawada Jn., Tenali Jn., Ongole., Nellore., Gudur Jn., Renigunta Jn., Tirupati., Chittor., Katpadi Jn., Jolarpettai Jn., Kuppam.
12775	Cocanada Express	Lingampalli	20:20	All Days	Rajamundry., Bhimavaram Town., Gudivada Jn., Rayanapadu., Warangal., Secunderabad Jn.

== Station amenities ==
It is one of the 38 stations in the division to be equipped with Automatic Ticket Vending Machines (ATVMs).

== See also ==
- Kakinada Port railway station
