= Rayanapadu =

- Neighbourhood
- Interactive map of Rayanapadu
- Location in Andhra Pradesh, India
- Coordinates: 16.5710°N 80.5688°E
- Country: India
- State: Andhra Pradesh
- District: NTR

Area
  - Total: 8.34 km^{2} (3.22 sq mi)
- Elevation: 19 m (62 ft)

Population (2011)
  - Total: 3,504
  - Density: 420/km^{2} (1,090/sq mi)

Languages
  - Official: Telugu
- Time zone: UTC+5:30 (IST)

Rayanapadu is a residential hub located in western part of Vijayawada in the Indian state of Andhra Pradesh. It falls under Vijayawada Rural mandal in Vijayawada revenue division of NTR district. Guntupalli Railway Wagon Workshop is located at a distance of 3.5 km from here. There is a proposal to merge this place into Vijayawada Municipal Corporation (VMC) to form a Greater Vijayawada Municipal Corporation.

== Demographics ==
As of 2011 census, the village had a population of 3,504. The total population constitute, 1,742 males, 1,762 females and 323 children in the age group of 0–6 years. The sex ratio stands at 1012 females per 1000 males and the average literacy rate is 79.13% with 2,517 literates, significantly higher than the state average of 67.41%.

== Transport ==
Rayanapadu railway station is a satellite railway station of Vijayawada. It lies on the Kazipet–Vijayawada section.

== See also ==
- Vijayawada (rural) mandal
