= Rayanapadu railway station =

Railway station in Andhra Pradesh, India

Rayanapadu
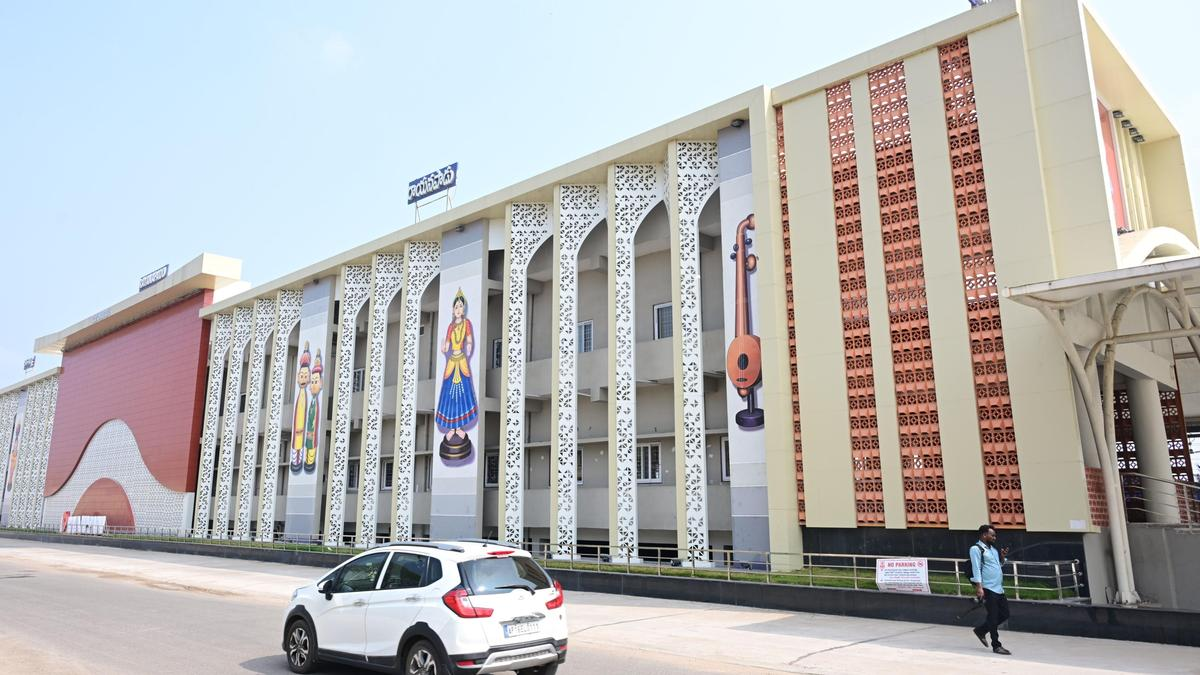

General information
- Location: Rayanapadu, Vijayawada, NTR district, Andhra Pradesh; India
- Coordinates: 16°34′38″N 80°33′45″E
- System: Commuter, Inter-city and Regional rail station
- Owner: Indian Railways
- Operator: Indian Railways
- Lines: Howrah–Chennai main line; New Delhi–Chennai main line; Guntur–Tenali section; Tenali–Repalle branch line
- Platforms: 3
- Tracks: 6 5 ft 6 in (1,676 mm) broad gauge

Construction
- Structure type: Standard (on ground)
- Accessible: Disabled access

Other information
- Station code: RYP
- Zone(s): SCoR
- Division(s): Vijayawada
- Classification: Non-Suburban Grade-3 (NSG-3)

History
- Opened: 1899
- Electrified: 1980–81

Services
Preceding station	Indian Railways	Following station
Kondapalli towards ?	New Delhi–Chennai main line	Vijayawada towards ?
Route map
Location
- Location within Andhra Pradesh Location within India
- Interactive map

Rayanapadu railway station (station code - RYP) is an Indian Railways station in Rayanapadu, Vijayawada of Andhra Pradesh. It lies on Kazipet - Vijayawada section of New Delhi - Chennai main line. It is administered under Vijayawada railway division of the South Central Railway zone. It is used as a bypass station to reduce congestion of the rail traffic on Vijayawada Junction.

== Classification ==
In terms of earnings and outward passengers handled, Rayanapadu is categorized as a Non-Suburban Grade-6 (NSG-6) railway station. Based on the re–categorization of Indian Railway stations for the period of 2017–18 and 2022–23, an NSG–6 category station earns nearly ₹1 crore and handles close to 1 million passengers.

== See also ==
- List of railway stations in India
