= Electric Loco Shed, Vijayawada =

Loco shed in Andhra Pradesh, India

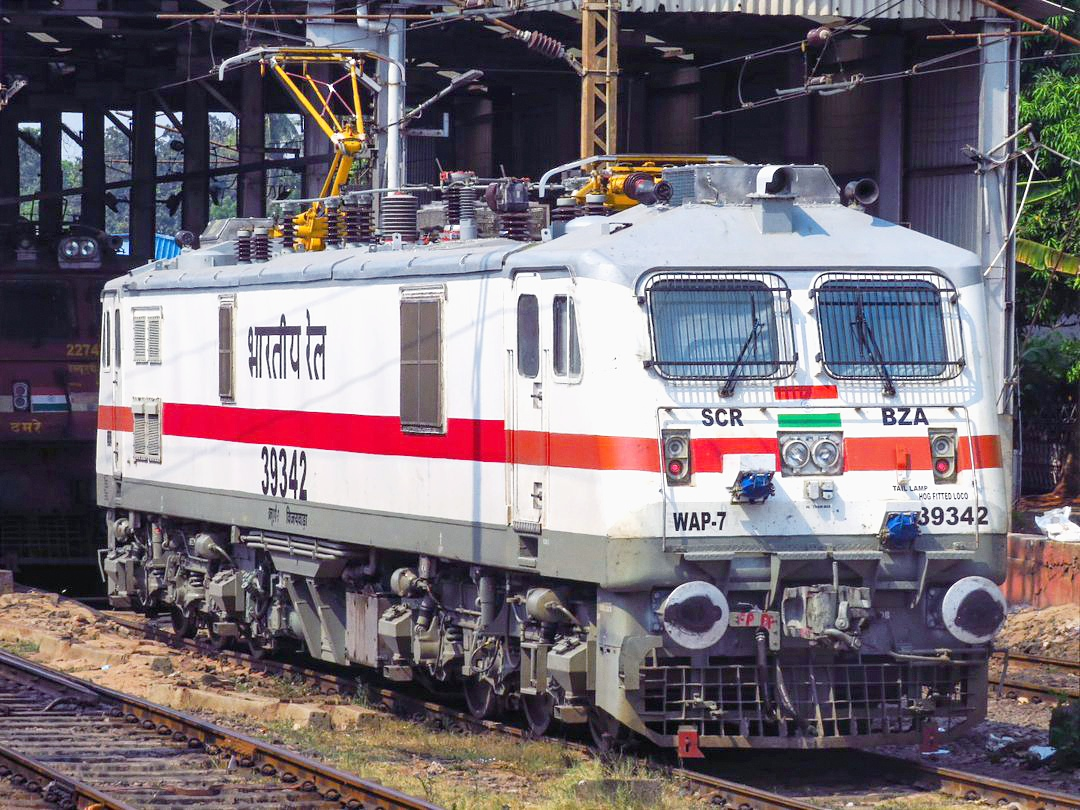
- Vijayawada based WAP-7 at BZA ELS.

- Location within Andhra Pradesh

Location
- Location: Vijayawada, Andhra Pradesh
- Coordinates: 16.5184°N 80.6195°E

Characteristics
- Owner: Indian Railways
- Operator: South Coast Railways
- Depot code: BZA
- Type: Engine shed
- Roads: 7
- Rolling stock: WAP-4; WAP-7; WAG-5; WAG-9

History
- Opened: 1981; 45 years ago
- Former rolling stock: WAM-4; WAG-7

Electric Loco Shed, Vijayawada is a motive power depot performing locomotive maintenance and repair facility for electric locomotives of the Indian Railways, located at Vijayawada of the South Coast Railway zone in Andhra Pradesh, India.

== Locomotives ==
Serial No.	Locomotive Class	Horsepower	Quantity
1.	WAP-4	5350	63
2.	WAP-7	6350	82
3.	WAG-5	3850	35
4.	WAG-9	6120	121
Total locomotives active as of January 2026			301
