= Samalkot Junction railway station =

Railway junction station in Andhra Pradesh, India

Samarlakota Junction
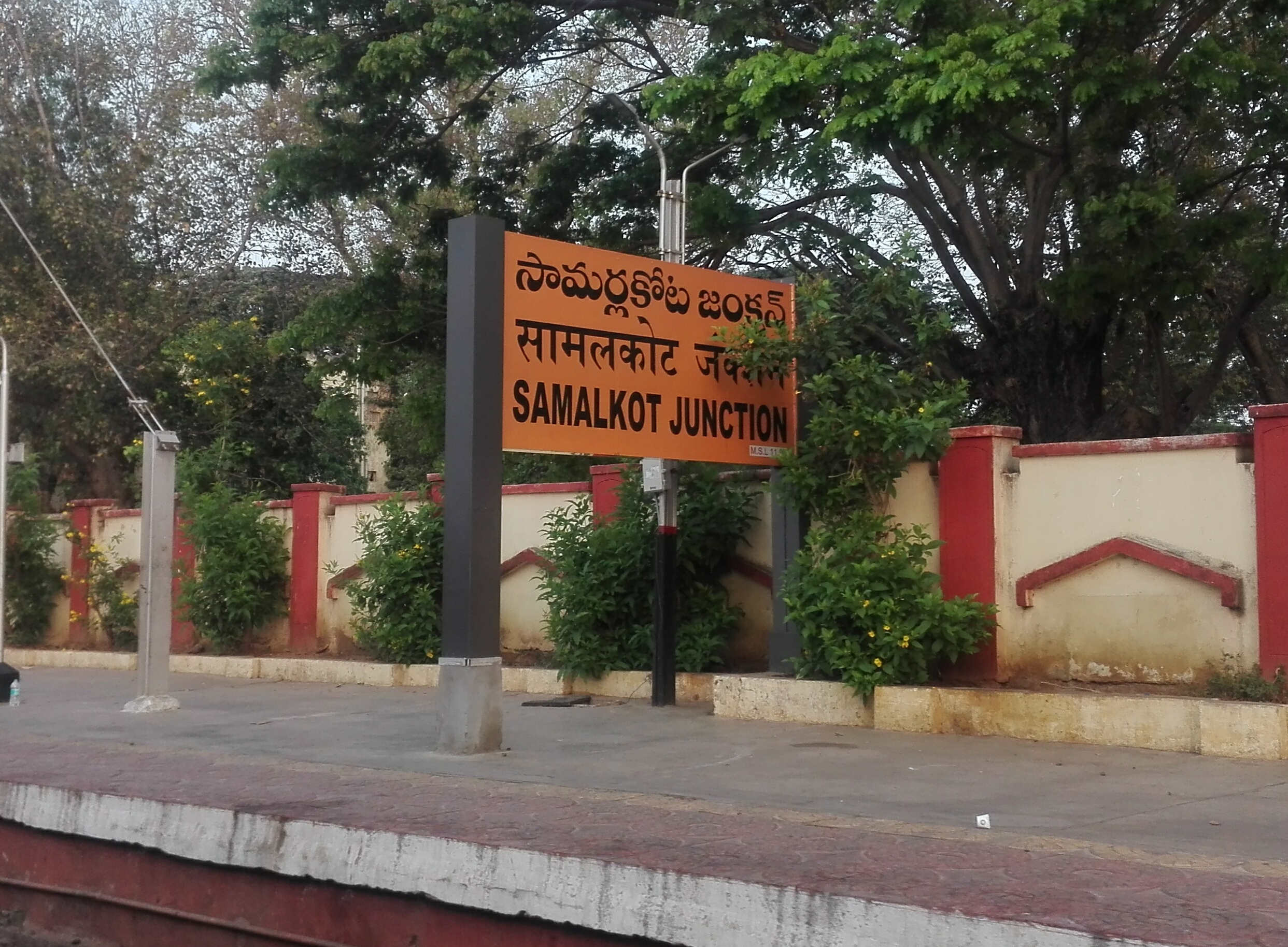
- Samalkot Junction railway station Nameboard

General information
- Location: Samarlalkota, Andhra Pradesh; India
- Coordinates: 17°02′43″N 82°10′09″E
- System: Commuter, Inter-city and Regional rail station
- Owner: Indian Railways
- Operator: Indian Railways
- Lines: Howrah–Chennai main line; Samarlakota–Kakinada Port branch line
- Platforms: 3
- Tracks: 6 5 ft 6 in (1,676 mm) broad gauge
- Train operators: South Coast Railway zone

Construction
- Structure type: Standard (on ground)
- Parking: Yes available
- Accessible: Disabled access

Other information
- Status: Active
- Station code: SLO
- Zone(s): SCoR
- Division(s): Vijayawada
- Classification: Non-Suburban Grade-3 (NSG-3)

History
- Opened: 1899
Route map
Location
- Location within Andhra Pradesh Location within India
- Interactive map

Samarlakota railway station (station code:SLO) is an Indian Railways station in Samarlakota of Kakinada district in the Indian state of Andhra Pradesh. It lies on the Howrah–Chennai main line and a junction station for Samarlakota–Kakinada Port branch line, administered under Vijayawada railway division of South Coast Railway zone (formerly South Central Railway zone).

== History ==
Between 1893 and 1896, 1,288 km (800 mi) of the East Coast State Railway, between Vijayawada and Cuttack was opened for traffic. The southern part of the East Coast State Railway (from Waltair to Vijayawada) was taken over by Madras Railway in 1901.

== Classification ==
In terms of earnings and outward passengers handled, Samarlakota is categorized as a Non-Suburban Grade-3 (NSG-3) railway station. Based on the re–categorization of Indian Railway stations for the period of 2017–18 and 2022–23, an NSG–3 category station earns between ₹20–₹100 crore and handles 5–10 million passengers.

== Station amenities ==
Samarlakota is one of the 38 stations in the division to be equipped with Automatic Ticket Vending Machines (ATVMs).

== Halting trains ==
Train No.	Train Name	Source	Destination	Arrival	Departure	Halt	Running	Towards
18190	Ernakulam - Tatanagar Express	Ernakulam Jn.	Tatanagar Jn.	08:23	08:25	2 min	Thu, Mon	Duvvada, Vizianagaram Jn., Rayagada, Sambalpur, Rourkela
12805	Janmabhoomi SF Express	Visakhapatnam Jn.	Lingampalli	08:34	08:35	1 min	All Days	Rajamundry, Vijayawada Jn., Tenali Jn., Guntur Jn., Nalgonda, Secunderabad Jn.
13352	Allepy - Dhanbad Express	Alappuzha	Dhanbad Jn.	08:34	08:35	1 min	All Days	Visakhapatnam Jn., Rayagada, Sambalpur, Rourkela, Ranchi, Bokaro Steel City
12718	Ratnachal SF Express	Vijayawada Jn.	Visakhapatnam Jn.	09:23	09:25	2 min	All Days	Tuni, Anakapalle, Visakhapatnam Jn.
17240	Simhadri Express	Visakhapatnam Jn.	Guntur Jn.	09:34	09:35	1 min	All Days	Rajamundry, Tadepalligudem, Eluru, Vijayawada Jn., Guntur Jn.
17249	Tirupati - Kakinada Town Express	Tirupati	Kakinada Town	09:48	09:50	2 min	All Days	Kakinada Town
12803	Nizamuddin Swarna Jayanti SF Express	Visakhapatnam Jn.	Hazrat Nizamuddin	10:18	10:20	2 min	Mon, Fri	Vijayawada Jn., Warangal, Balharshah, Nagpur, Itarsi Jn., Bhopal Jn., Virangana Lakshmibai, Gwalior Jn., Agra Cantt., Mathura Jn., H. Nizamuddin
12835	Yesvantpur SF Express	Hatia	Yesvantpur Jn.	10:58	11:00	2 min	Wed, Mon	Vijayawada Jn., Nellore, Tirupati, Chittor, Katpadi Jn., Jolarpettai, Yesvantpur Jn.
13351	Dhanbad - Allepy Express	Dhanbad Jn.	Alappuzha	11:14	11:15	1 min	All Days	Vijayawada Jn., Ongole, Kavali, Nellore, MGR Chennai Central, Arakkonam Jn., Katpadi Jn., Salem Jn., Erode Jn., Coimbatore Jn., Palakkad, Ernakulam Jn.
12804	Visakhapatnam Swarna Jayanti SF Express	Hazrat Nizamuddin	Visakhapatnam Jn.	11:18	11:20	2 min	Thu, Mon	Visakhapatnam Jn.
17239	Simhadri Express	Guntur Jn.	Visakhapatnam Jn.	12:13	12:15	2 min	All Days	Tuni, Anakapalle, Visakhapatnam Jn.
11019	Konark Express	Chhatrapati Shivaji Maharaj Terminus (CSMT)	Bhubaneswar	12:23	12:25	2 min	All Days	Visakhapatnam Jn., Palasa, Brahmapur
17222	LTT - Kakinada Port Express	Lokmanya Tilak Terminus	Kakinada Port	12:35	12:37	2 min	Fri, Mon	Kakinada Town, Kakinada Port
17644	Circar Express	Kakinada Port	Chengalpattu	14:47	14:49	2 min	All Days	Bhimavaram Town, Gudivada Jn., Vijayawada Jn., New Guntur, Tenali Jn., Ongole, Kavali, Nellore, Chennai Egmore, Tambaram
12717	Ratnachal SF Express	Visakhapatnam Jn.	Vijayawada Jn.	15:06	15:07	1 min	All Days	Rajamundry, Tadepalligudem, Eluru
17250	Kakinada Town - Tirupati Express	Kakinada Town	Tirupati	15:08	15:10	2 min	All Days	Rajamundry, Tadepalligudem, Eluru, Vijayawada Jn., Tenali Jn., Bapatla, Ongole, Kavali, Nellore, Sri Kalahasti, Renigunta Jn.
18463	Prasanti Express	Bhubaneswar	KSR Bengaluru City Jn.	15:33	15:35	2 min	All Days	Vijayawada Jn., Guntur Jn., Nandyal, Guntakal Jn., Gooty Jn., Anantapur, Dharmavaram Jn., Hindupur
17488	Tirumala Express	Visakhapatnam Jn.	Kadapa	16:19	16:20	1 min	All Days	Rajamundry, Tadepalligudem, Eluru, Vijayawada Jn., Tenali Jn., Bapatla, Ongole, Kavali, Nellore, Gudur Jn., Sri Kalahasti, Tirupati, Rengiunta Jn., Razampeta
12806	Janmabhoomi SF Express	Lingampalli	Visakhapatnam Jn.	16:23	16:25	2 min	All Days	Tuni, Anakapalle, Visakhapatnam Jn.
12839	Chennai Mail	Howrah Jn.	MGR Chennai Central	16:29	16:30	1 min	All Days	Rajamundry, Vijayawada Jn., Tenali Jn., Bapatla, Ongole, Nellore, Gudur Jn.
17210	Seshadri Express	Kakinada Town	KSR Bengaluru City Jn.	17:38	17:40	2 min	All Days	Bhimavaram Town, Gudivada Jn. Vijayawada Jn., Tenali Jn., Ongole, Kavali, Nellore, Renigunta Jn., Tirupati, Chittor, Katpadi Jn., Jolarpettai, Kuppam, Krishnarajapuram
15906	Vivek Express	Dibrugarh	Kanniyakumari	17:54	17:55	1 min	Mon	Vijayawada Jn., Ongole, Nellore, Renigunta Jn., Katpadi Jn., Salem Jn., Erode Jn., Coimbatore Jn., Palakkad, Ernakulam Town, Thiruvananthapuram Central, Nagarcoil Jn.

Preceding station	Indian Railways	Following station
Pithapuram towards ?	South Central Railway zone Visakhapatnam–Vijayawada section of Howrah–Chennai main line	Gudaparti towards ?
Terminus	South Central Railway zone Samarlakota–Kakinada Port branch line	Sarpavaram towards ?
