= Electric Loco Shed, Lallaguda =

Loco shed in Telangana, India

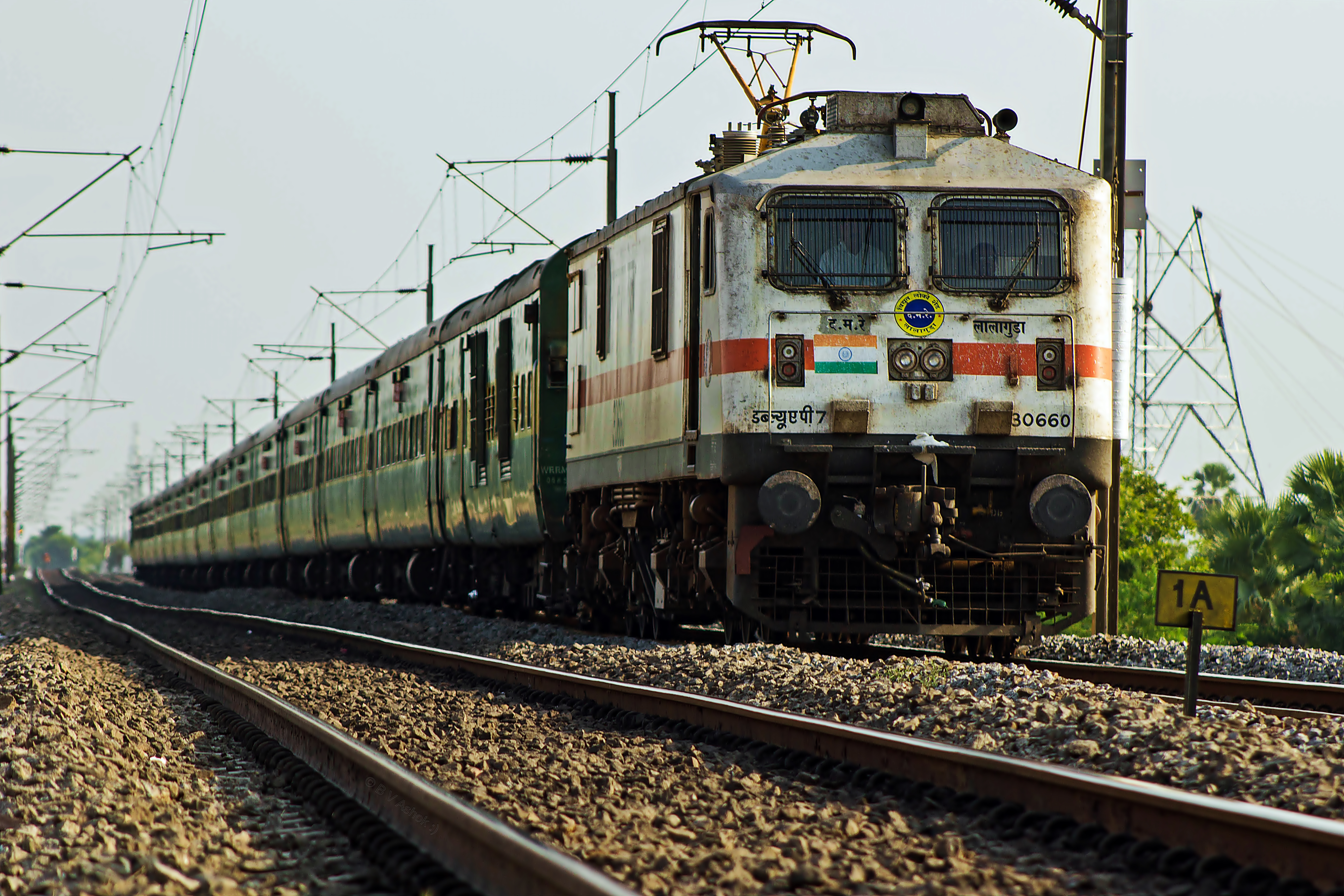
- Lallaguda based WAP-7 hauling MAS-NZM Garib Rath Express near Odela

- Location within Telangana

Location
- Location: Lallaguda South, Railway Colony, Secunderabad, Telangana
- Coordinates: 17°26′N 78°32′E

Characteristics
- Owner: Indian Railways
- Operator: South Central Railways
- Depot code: LGD
- Type: Engine shed
- Rolling stock: WAP-5; WAP-7; WAG-9

History
- Opened: 6 September 1995; 31 years ago
- Former rolling stock: WAP-4; WAG-7

Electric Loco Shed, Lallaguda is a motive power depot performing locomotive maintenance and repair facility for electric locomotives of the Indian Railways, located at Lallaguda of the South Central Railway zone in Telangana, India.

== Livery and markings ==
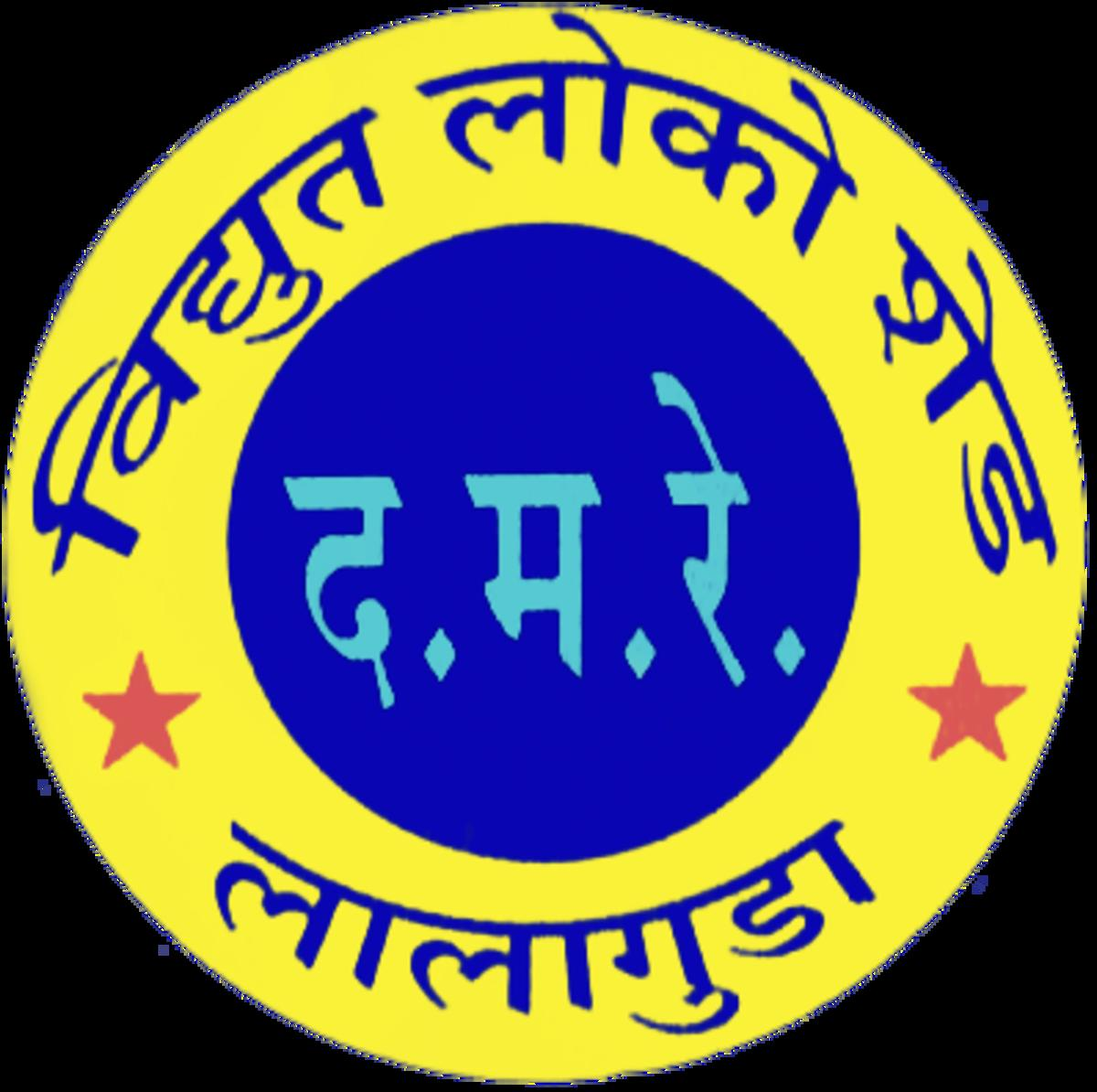
Logo of Electric Loco Shed, Lallaguda

Lallaguda ELS has its own logo and stencils. It is written on loco's body side as well as front & back side.

== Locomotives ==
Serial no.	Locomotive class	Horsepower	Quantity
1.	WAP-5	6120	4
2.	WAP-7	6350	163
3.	WAG-9	6120	147
Total locomotives active as of May 2026			314
