= Lingampalli railway station =

Railway station in Hyderabad, Telangana, India

Coordinates: 17.4832°N 78.3173°E

Lingampalli railway station, Hyderabad
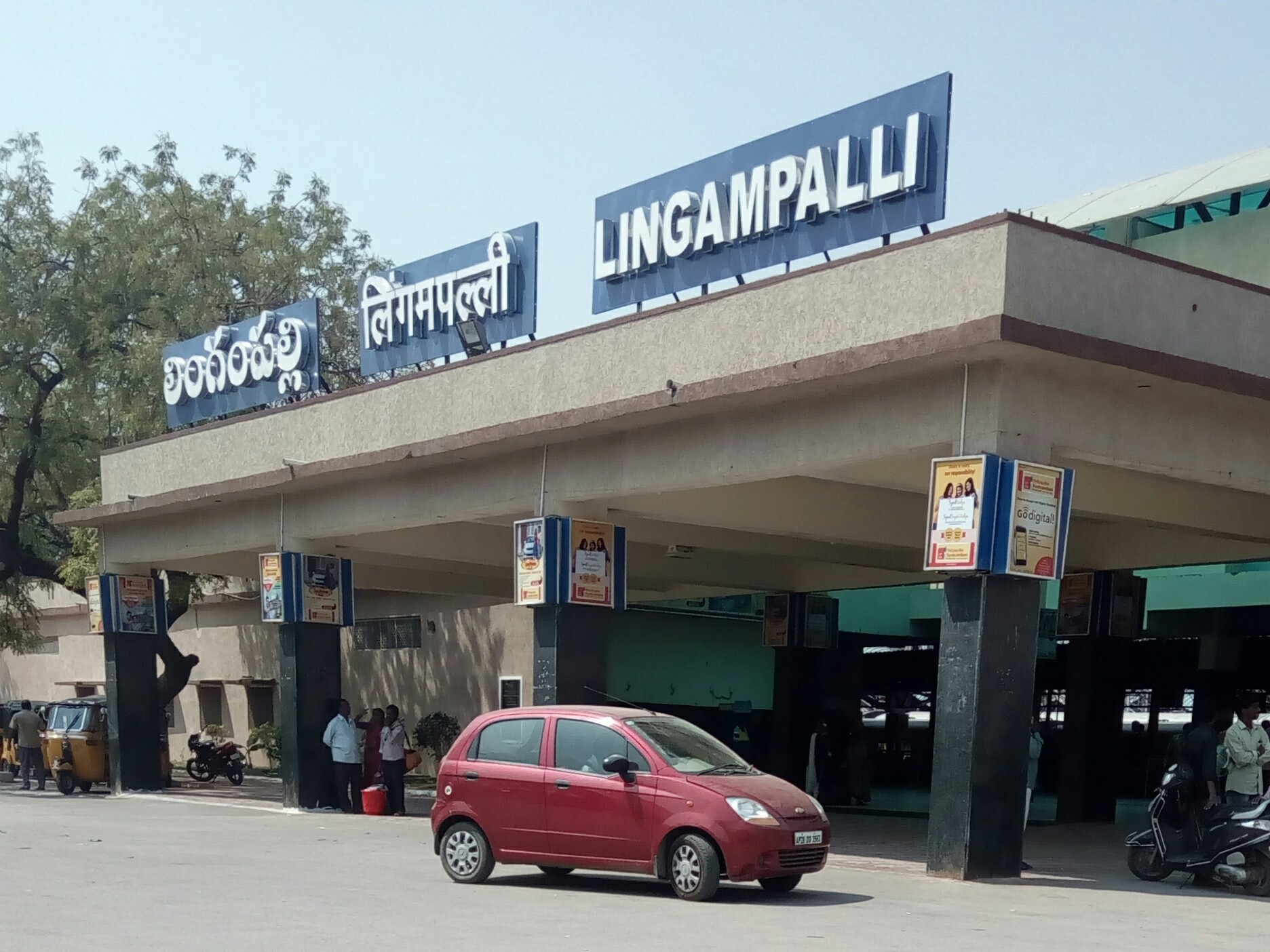
- Lingampally railway station entrance

General information
- Location: Lingampally, Hyderabad; India
- System: Indian Railways and Hyderabad MMTS station
- Platforms: 5 (5 & 6 double discharge PF)
- Tracks: 6

Other information
- Status: Staffed
- Station code: LPI
- Zone(s): South Central Railway zone
- Division(s): Secunderabad
- Classification: NSG–2

Passengers
- 2023–24: 58,43,624
Location

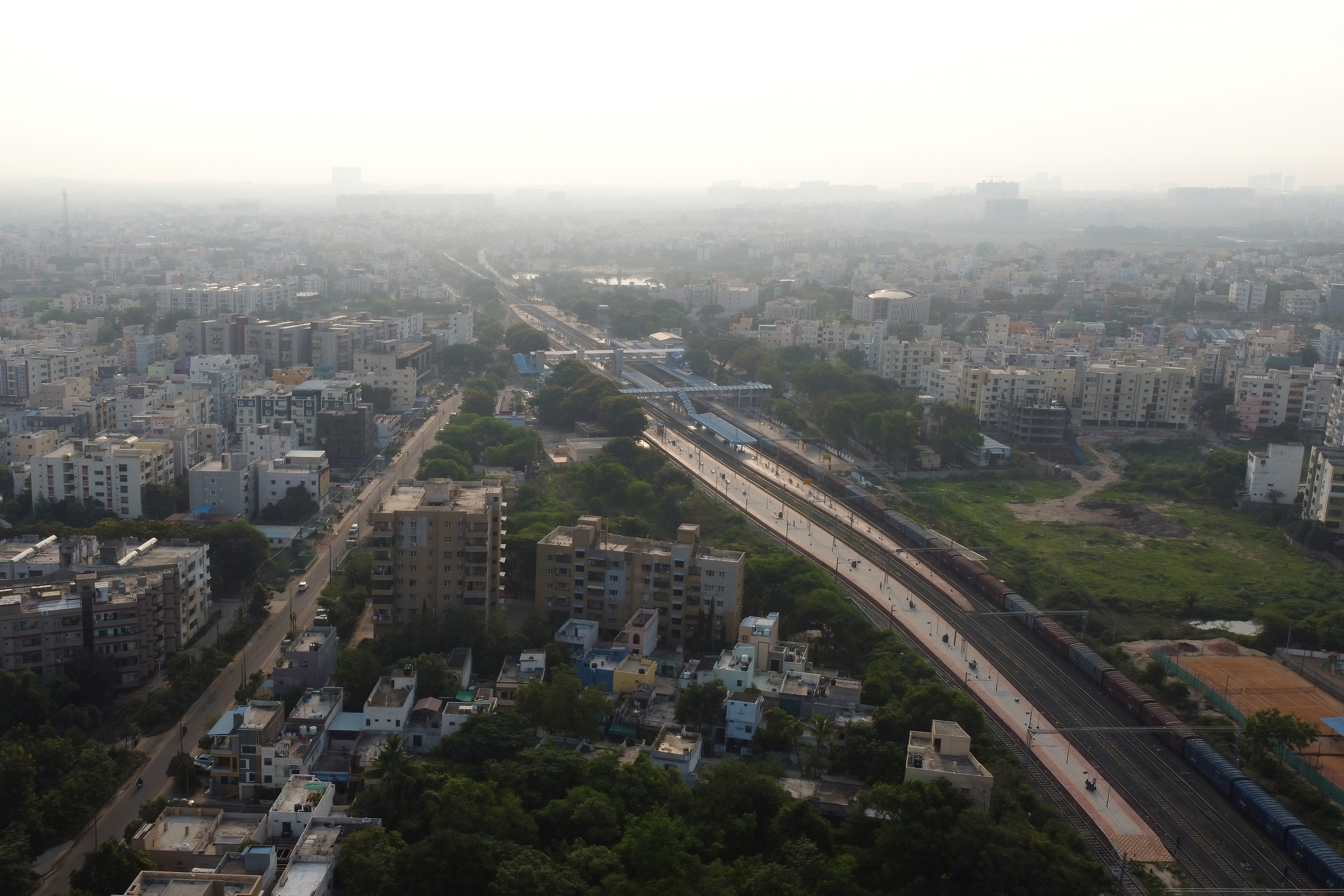
Aerial view of the station

Lingampalli railway station is a second grade non-suburban (NSG–2) category Indian railway station in Hyderabad railway division of South Central Railway zone. It is located in Hyderabad of the Indian state of Telangana. It was selected as one of the 21 stations to be developed under Amrit Bharat Stations scheme.

For the financial year 2023-24, the station recorded an overall originating passenger count of 58,43,624.

== Overview ==
Train name	Type	End points
Rayalaseema Express	Express	Tirupati−Nizamabad
Konark Express	Express	Bhubaneswar–Chhatrapati Shivaji Maharaj Terminus
Manuguru–CSMT Kolhapur Express	Express	Chhatrapati Shahu Maharaj Terminus−Manuguru
Palnadu Express	Express	Guntur−Vikarabad
Machilipatnam Express	Express	Bidar−Machilipatnam
Visakhapatnam–Lokmanya Tilak Terminus Express	Express	Visakhapatnam−Lokmanya Tilak Terminus
Kakinada–Lokmanya Tilak Terminus Express	Express	Kakinada Town−Lokmanya Tilak Terminus
SSS Hubbali–Hyderabad Express	Express	SSS Hubbali−Hyderabad
Intercity Express	Intercity Express	Bidar−Secunderabad
Intercity Express	Intercity Express	Gulbarga−Hyderabad

== Lines ==
- Hyderabad Multi-Modal Transport System
  - Falaknuma–Lingampalli route (FL Line)
  - Hyderabad–Lingampalli route (HL Line)

== Facilities ==
Railway station entrance is not equipped with luggage scanning facility. State Bank of India ATM is present in the platform. Well maintained retiring rooms available for all class travellers. Enough parking place with paid parking facility is available near to platform 1.

== Originating express trains ==
Train No.	Train Name	Destination	Departure	Running	Route
12738	Lingampalli-Kakindada Port Gowthami Express	Kakinada Port	20:30	All Days	Secunderabad Jn, Kazipet Jn, Rayanapadu, Eluru, Tadepalligudem, Rajahmundry, Samalkot Jn.
12734	Lingampalli-Tirupati Narayanadri SF Express	Tirupati	17:30	All Days	Secunderabad Jn, Nalgonda, Guntur Jn, Ongole, Gudur Jn, Renigunta Jn.
17058	Lingampalli-CSMT Devagairi Express	CSMT	12:25	All Days	Secunderabad Jn, Nizamabad Jn, Mudhkhed Jn, Purna Jn, Aurangabad, Kalyan Jn.
12796	Lingampalli-Vijayawada Intercity Express	Vijayawada Junction	04:40	All Days	Secunderabad Jn, Begumpet, Nalgonda, Guntur Jn, Mangalagiri.
17256	Lingampalli-Narasapur Express	Narasapur	21:00	All Days	Secunderabad Jn, Nalgonda, Guntur Jn, Vijayawada Jn, Gudivada Jn, Bhimavaram Town, Bhimavaram Jn.
12776	Lingampalli-Kakinada Town Cocanada SF Express	Kakinada Town Junction	19:00	All Days	Secunderabad Jn, Warangal, Rayanapadu, Gudivada Jn, Bhimavaram Town, Rajahmundry.
12806	Lingampalli-Visakhapatnam Janmabhoomi Express	Visakhapatnam Junction	06:15	All Days	Secunderabad Jn, Charlapalli, Nalgonda, Guntur Jn, Vijayawada Jn, Rajahmundry, Samalkot Jn.
