= South Coast Railway zone =

18th Railway zone of Indian Railways

South Coast Railway

- South Coast Railway in dark blue

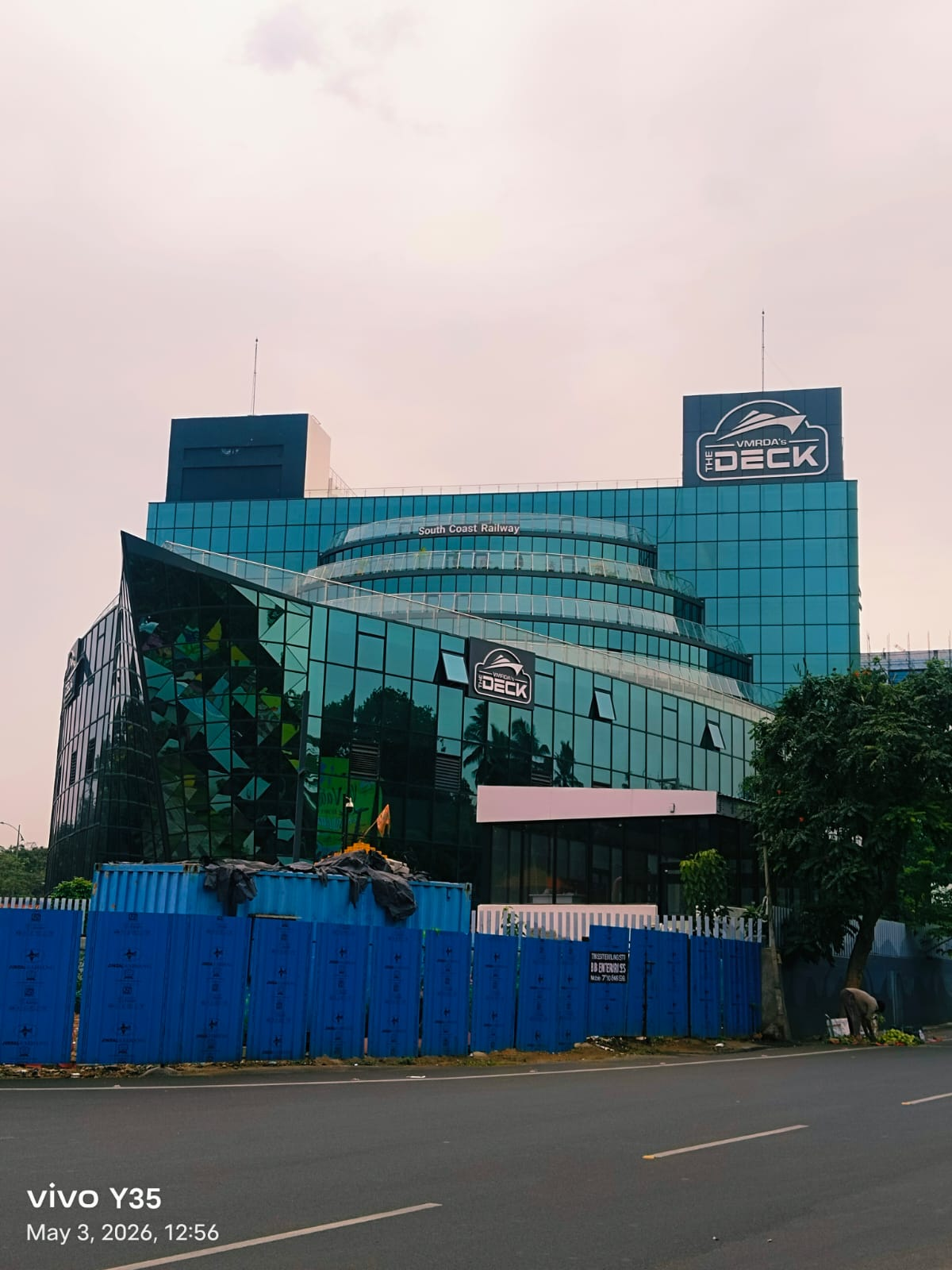
- Temporary headquarters of SCoR at The Deck

Overview
- Headquarters: The Deck, Siripuram, Visakhapatnam, Andhra Pradesh, India
- Key people: Sandeep Mathur, General Manager
- Reporting mark: SCoR
- Locale: Andhra Pradesh and parts of Karnataka, Telangana, Tamil Nadu
- Dates of operation: 1 June 2026; 4 months ago–present
- Predecessor: ECoR; SCR

Technical
- Track gauge: 5 ft 6 in (1,676 mm)
- Electrification: 25 kV 50 Hz AC
- Length: 3,532.407 km (2,194.936 mi)

Other
- Website: Official Website

The South Coast Railway (abbreviated SCoR) is one of the 19 railway zones of the Indian Railways. The zonal headquarters is located at Visakhapatnam, Andhra Pradesh having four divisions – Guntakal, Guntur, Vijayawada and Visakhapatnam.

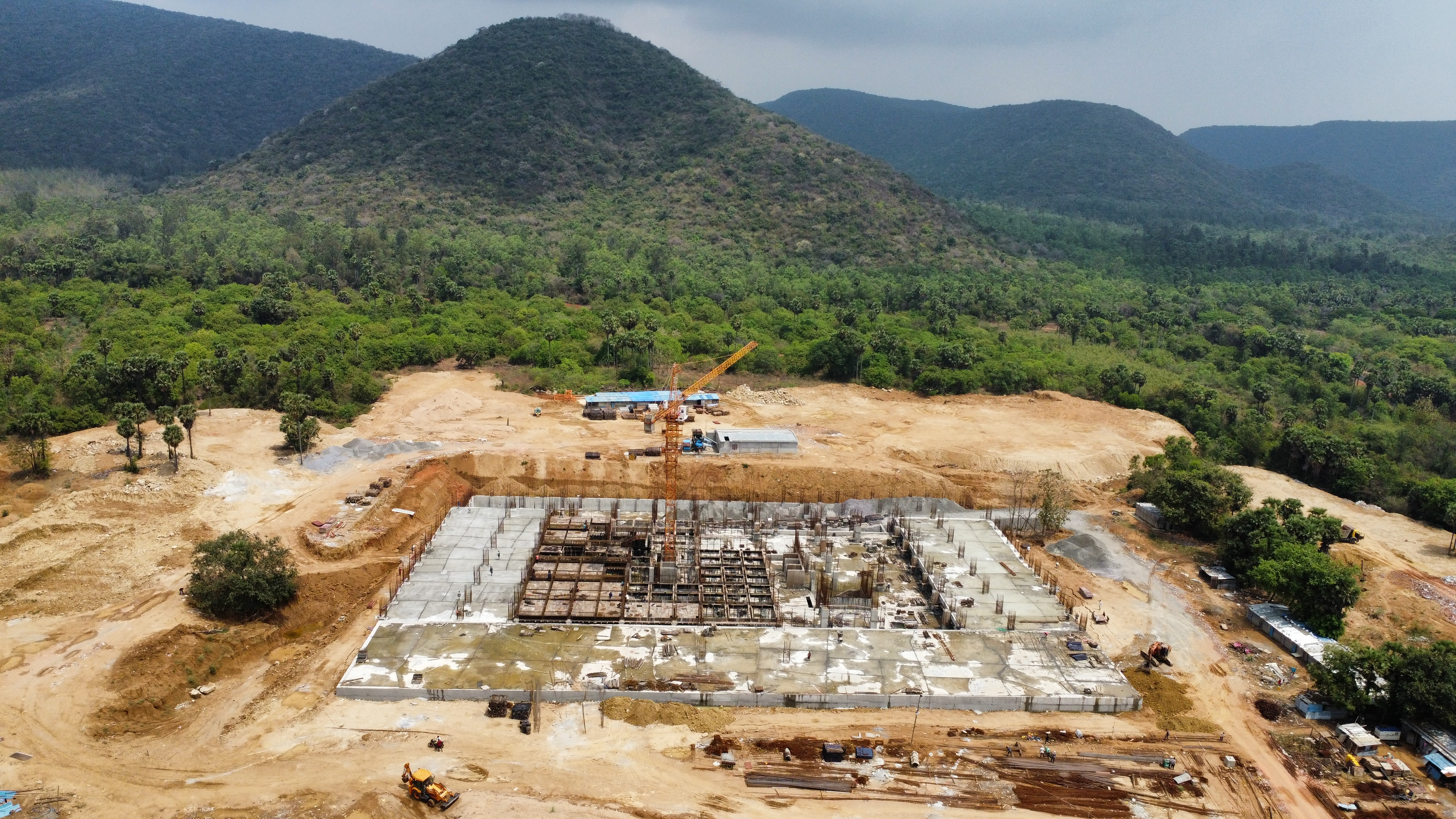
Construction status of South Coast Railway Zone Headquarters in Visakhapatnam in March 2026

The zone has been operational since 1 June 2026.

== History ==
The Andhra Pradesh Reorganization Act, 2014 was enacted paving way for the formation of South Coast railway zone. The Government of India has announced the creation of the zone on 17 February 2019. On 28 February 2019, the Union cabinet approved the detailed project report. After a six-year delay, Prime Minister Narendra Modi laid the foundation stone for the construction of headquarters at Visakhapatnam on 8 January 2025.

The union cabinet gave post-facto approval to the final Detailed Project report of South Coast Railway zone with partial modifications to it on 7 February 2025. Later, on 28 April 2026, Railway Minister Ashwini Vaishnaw announced that the new South Coastal Zone will come into existence and start functioning from 1 June 2026. Addressing a gathering after the Ground Breaking Ceremony of Google Cloud India AI Hub at Visakhapatnam, Vaishnaw said, "Gazette Notification for the creation of South Coastal Railway Zone will be issued, with 1 June 2026 being notified as the effective date".

== Divisions ==
South Coast Railway consists of four railway divisions. They are:

- Guntakal railway division
- Guntur railway division
- Vijayawada railway division
- Visakhapatnam railway division

== Network ==
The zone covers the state of Andhra Pradesh and parts of Karnataka, Telangana, Tamil Nadu.

=== Route Length ===
The 1106 route km of the present Waltair division is distributed between East Coast Railway – Rayagada division (541 km), Khurda division (115 km) and Visakhapatnam division (460 km). SCoR's division-wise route km and running track km is as follows: Vijayawada – 1,111 and 2,409 respectively, Guntakal – 1,346 and 2,183, Guntur – 613 and 883 and Visakhapatnam – 450 and 979 respectively.

==== Jurisdiction of Visakhapatnam Division ====
The following sections remain under Visakhapatnam railway division after carving out Rayagada railway division from Waltair railway division.

- Duvvada - Visakhapatnam - Palasa - Ichchapuram
- Duvvada - Simhachalam North
- Vadlapudi - Duvvada
- Visakhapatnam Steel Plant - Vadlapudi
- Vizianagaram - Kuneru
- Naupada Jn - Parlakhemundi
- Bobbili - Salur

==== Jurisdiction of Guntakal Division ====
- Guntakal - Raichur (excluding)
- Guntakal - Dhone - Nandyal (excluding)
- Nandyal - Yerraguntla
- Guntakal - Ballari (excluding)
- Guntakal - Renigunta
- Guntakal - Dharmavaram
- Dharmavaram - Pakala
- Gudur (excluding) - Renigunta - Pakala - Katpadi (excluding)
- Kadapa - Pendlimarri
- Pendekallu - Gooty
- Gooty - Kalluru

==== Jurisdiction of Guntur Division ====
- Guntur - Vishnupuram (exclusive)
- New Piduguralla - Savalyapuram
- Nallapadu - Nandyal
- Guntur - Tenali (exclusive) - Repalle
- Guntur - Krishna Canal (exclusive)
- Nadikudi - Macherla
- Guntur byepass line
- Gundlakamma- Kanigiri

==== Jurisdiction of Vijayawada Division ====
- Gudur - Duvvada (Exclusive)
- Vijayawada - Motumari
- Vijayawada - Gudivada - Bhimavaram - Nidadavolu
- Gudivada - Machilipatnam
- Bhimavaram - Narsapur
- Samalkot - Kakinada Port
- Kakinada Town - Kotipalli
- Venkatachalam - Krishnapatnam Port
- Vijayawada Bulb Cabins
- Krishna Canal Junction (Majour Interchange)

== Performance and earnings ==
The zone operates more than 500 trains during peak season to clear the rush of passengers. For the financial year 2020–2021, the zone is expected to collect ₹13,000 crore (equivalent to ₹170 billion or US$1.7 billion in 2026) per annum as per the DPR of SCoR.

== Infrastructure ==
=== Wi-Fi Stations ===
Various railway stations in South Coast Railway zone are Wi-Fi enabled, provided by Railwire in association with Google which are as follows:

- Urban: Visakhapatnam Junction, Vijayawada Junction, Guntur Junction, Gudivada Junction, Tirupati, Rajahmundry, Kakinada Town, Nellore, Srikakulam Road, Bhimavaram Town, Tanuku, Samalkot Junction, Eluru, Kadapa, Proddatur, Renigunta Junction, Anantapur, Ongole, Guntakal Junction, Gudur Junction, Tadepalligudem, Tenali Junction, Tuni, Vizianagaram, Chirala, Yadgir, Machilipatnam, Pakala Junction, Chittoor and Raichur
- Sub-urban: Powerpet-Eluru, New Guntur- Guntur, Duvvada-Visakhapatnam, Anakapalli-Visakhapatnam, Simhachalam-Visakhapatnam, Simhachalam North-Visakhapatnam, Marripalem-Visakhapatnam, Pendurthi-Visakhapatnam, Kotthavalasa-Visakhapatnam, Gunadala-Vijayawada, Kovvur-Rajahmundry, Rayanapadu-Vijayawada, Kakinada Port-Kakinada and Godavari-Rajahmundry
- Rural: Gollapalli, Badampudi, Bhiknur, Bhimadolu, Chagallu, Chebrol, Denduluru, Duggirala, Gannavaram, Krishna Canal Junction, Mangalagiri, Mustabada, Navabpalem, Nambur, Nidadavolu Junction, Nuzvid, Pedda Avutapalle, Vinukonda, Pedana, Ramavarappadu, Uppaluru, Nidamanuru, Madhura Nagar, Pedavadlapudi, Pulla, Sangamjagarlamudi, Telaprolu, Gundla, Vatlur, Talmadla, Upplavai

=== Depots in divisions ===
The zone has passenger coach care depots at Visakhapatnam in Visakhapatnam railway division.Kakinada, Narsapur, Machilipatnam, Vijayawada in Vijayawada railway division. Nallapadu, Guntur in Guntur railway division. Tirupati and Guntakal in Guntakal railway division. Additionally Vijayawada, Visakhapatnam and Gooty have wagon maintenance depots.

=== Pit Lines ===
The zone has 7 pitlines at Vijayawada, 3 pitlines at Kakinada, 2 pitlines at Narsapuram, 2 pitlines at Machilipatnam, 5 pitlines at Tirupathi, 1 pitline at Guntakal, 6 pitlines at Visakhapatnam, 3 pitlines at Guntur, 1 Pitline at Nallapadu

=== Training Institutes ===
The zone has training institutes for imparting and learning railway techniques serving both Indian as well as foreign railway personnel at Vijayawada and Guntakal.

=== Healthcare ===
Divisional hospitals at Visakhapatnam, Vijayawada, Guntakal, Guntur and Rayanapadu have healthcare facilities serving exclusively for the employees of Indian railways and their families.

== Loco Sheds ==
The zone has loco sheds at:

- Diesel Loco Shed, Gooty
- Diesel Loco Shed, Guntakal
- Diesel Loco Shed, Vijayawada
- Diesel Loco Shed, Visakhapatnam
- Electric Loco Shed, Vijayawada
- Electric Loco Shed, Visakhapatnam
- Memu Car Shed at Rajahmundry

It also has four electric loco trip sheds at Guntakal, Renigunta, Vijayawada and Visakhapatnam.

There are plans to convert the trip shed in Guntakal to an electric loco shed.

== See also ==
- Transport in Andhra Pradesh
