= Gannavaram (disambiguation) =

Gannavaram is a town in the Indian state of Andhra Pradesh.

Gannavaram may also refer to:

- Gannavaram Assembly constituency (disambiguation)
  - Gannavaram, Konaseema Assembly constituency, in Konaseema district
  - Gannavaram, Krishna Assembly constituency, in Krishna district
- Gannavaram bus station
- Gannavaram mandal
- Gannavaram railway station
- Gannavaram, Y. Ramavaram Mandal, a village
- Gannavaram Airport, an alternative name of Vijayawada Airport
