= Coastal Andhra =

Geographic region of Andhra Pradesh, India

Coastal Andhra Kōstā Āndhra Amaravati–Vijayawada region
- Geographic region of Andhra Pradesh
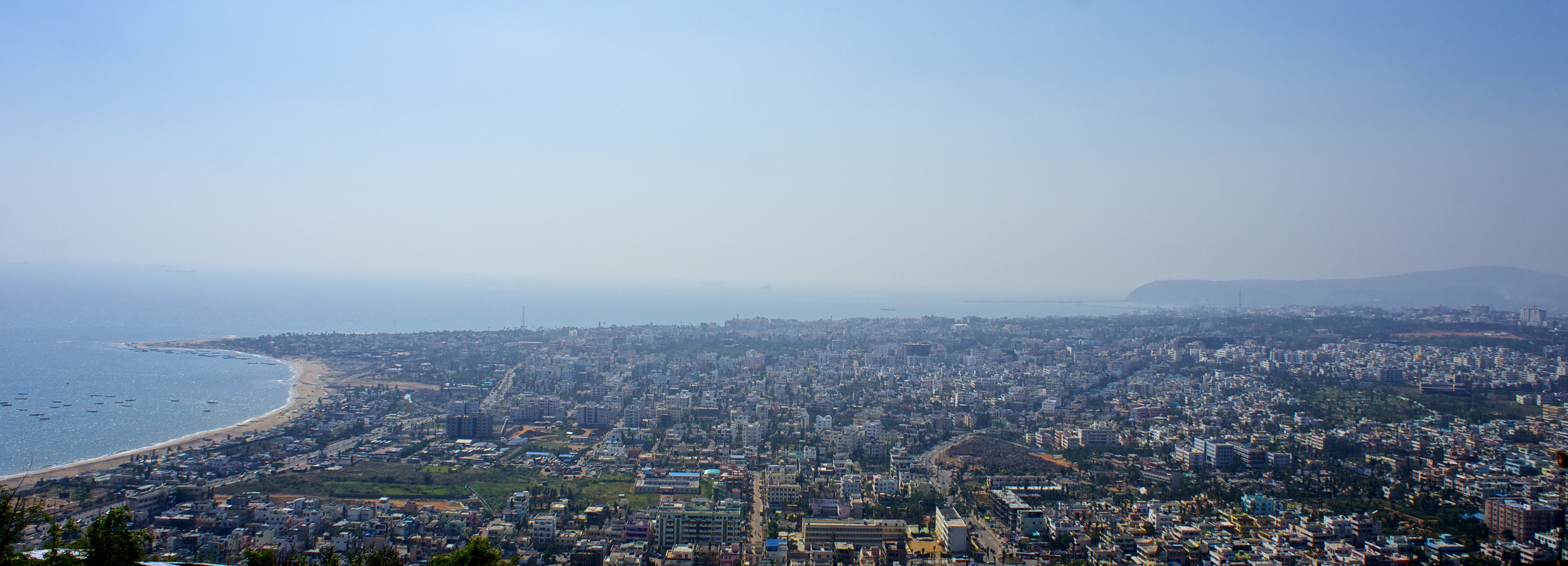
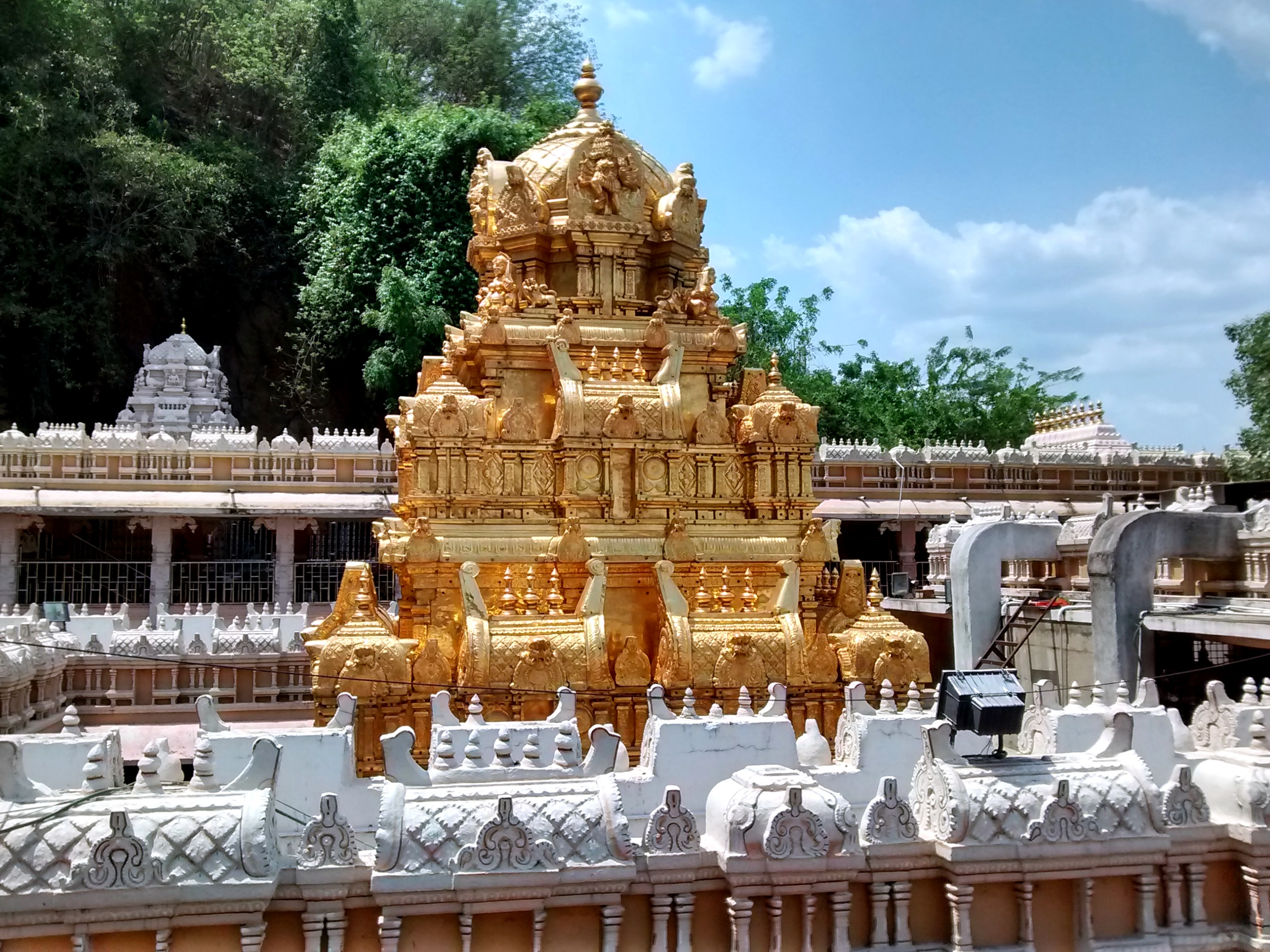
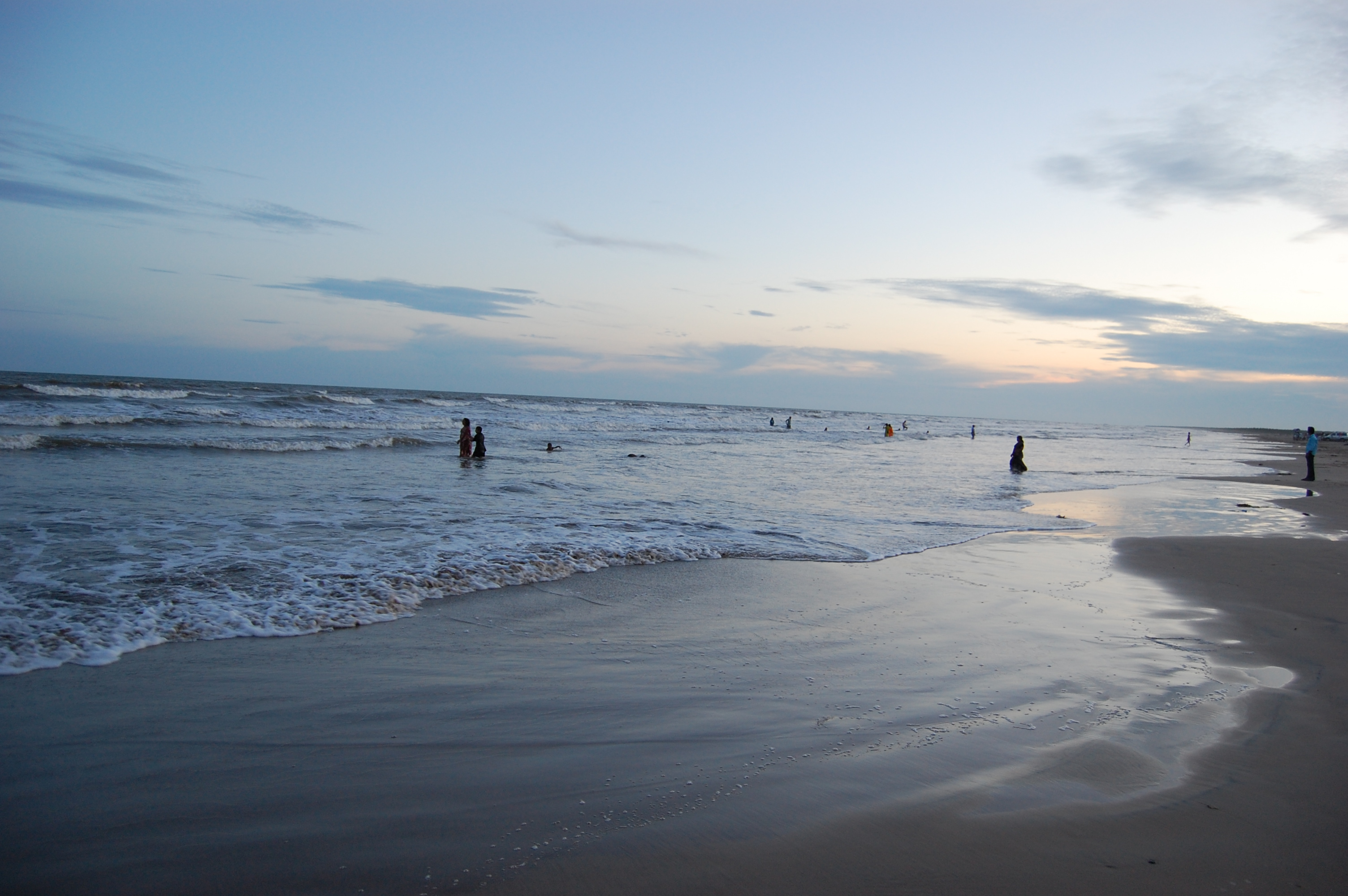
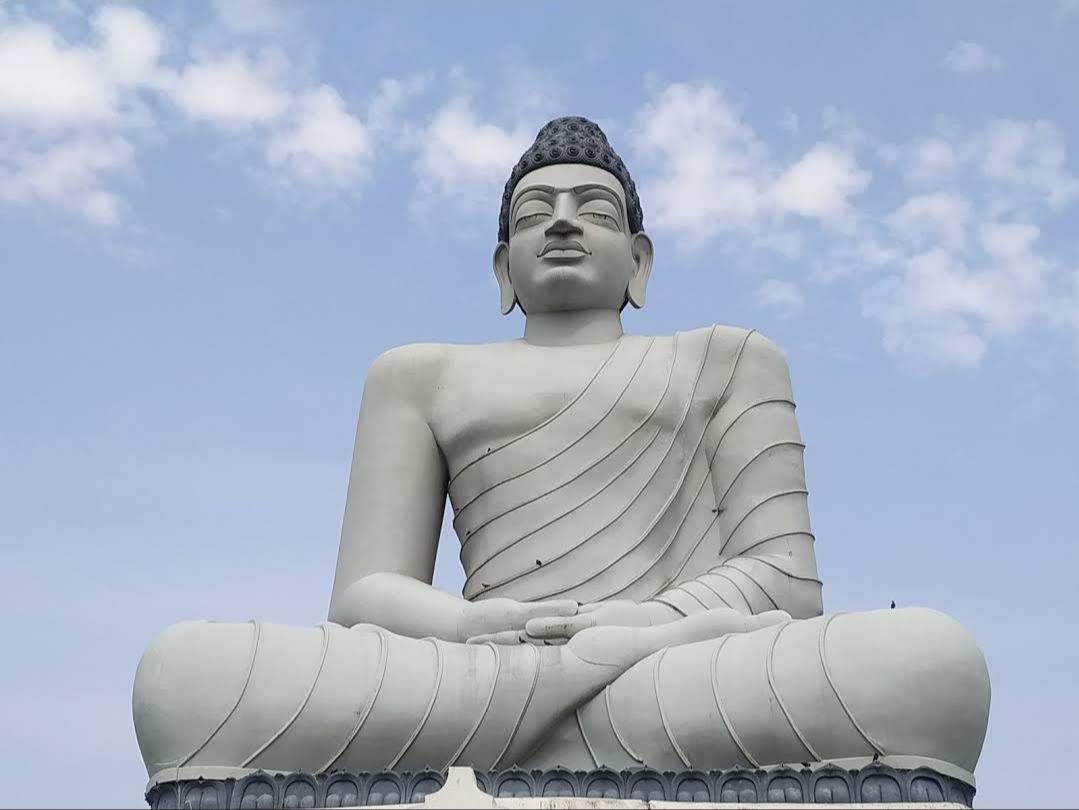
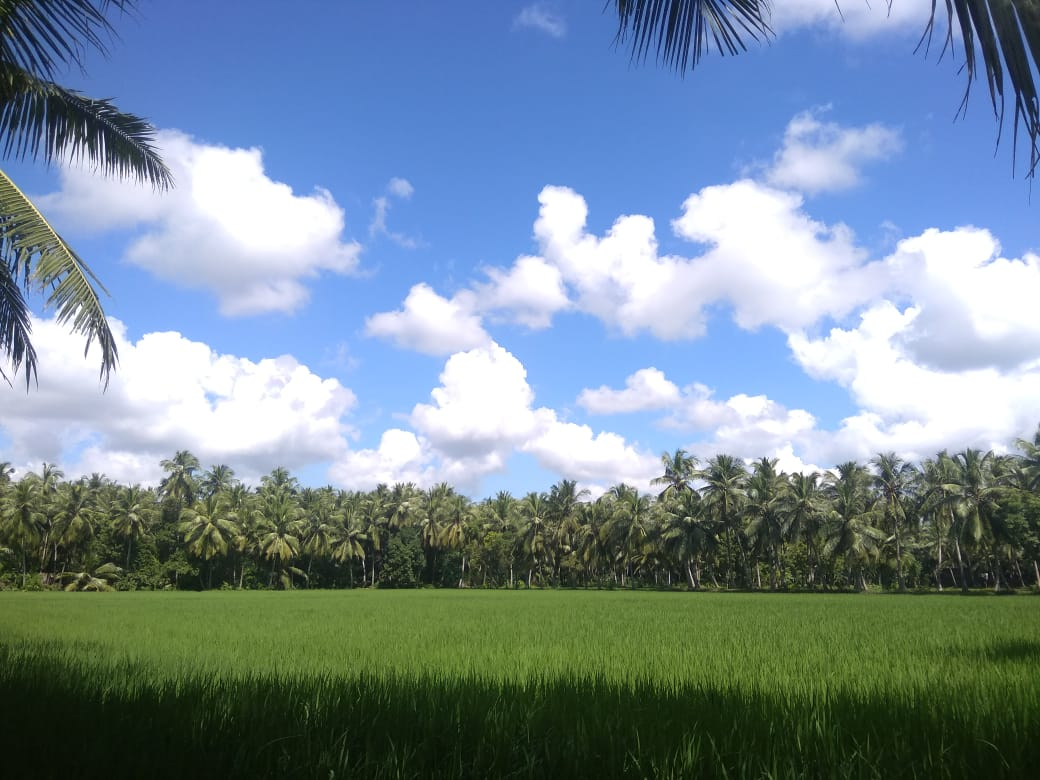
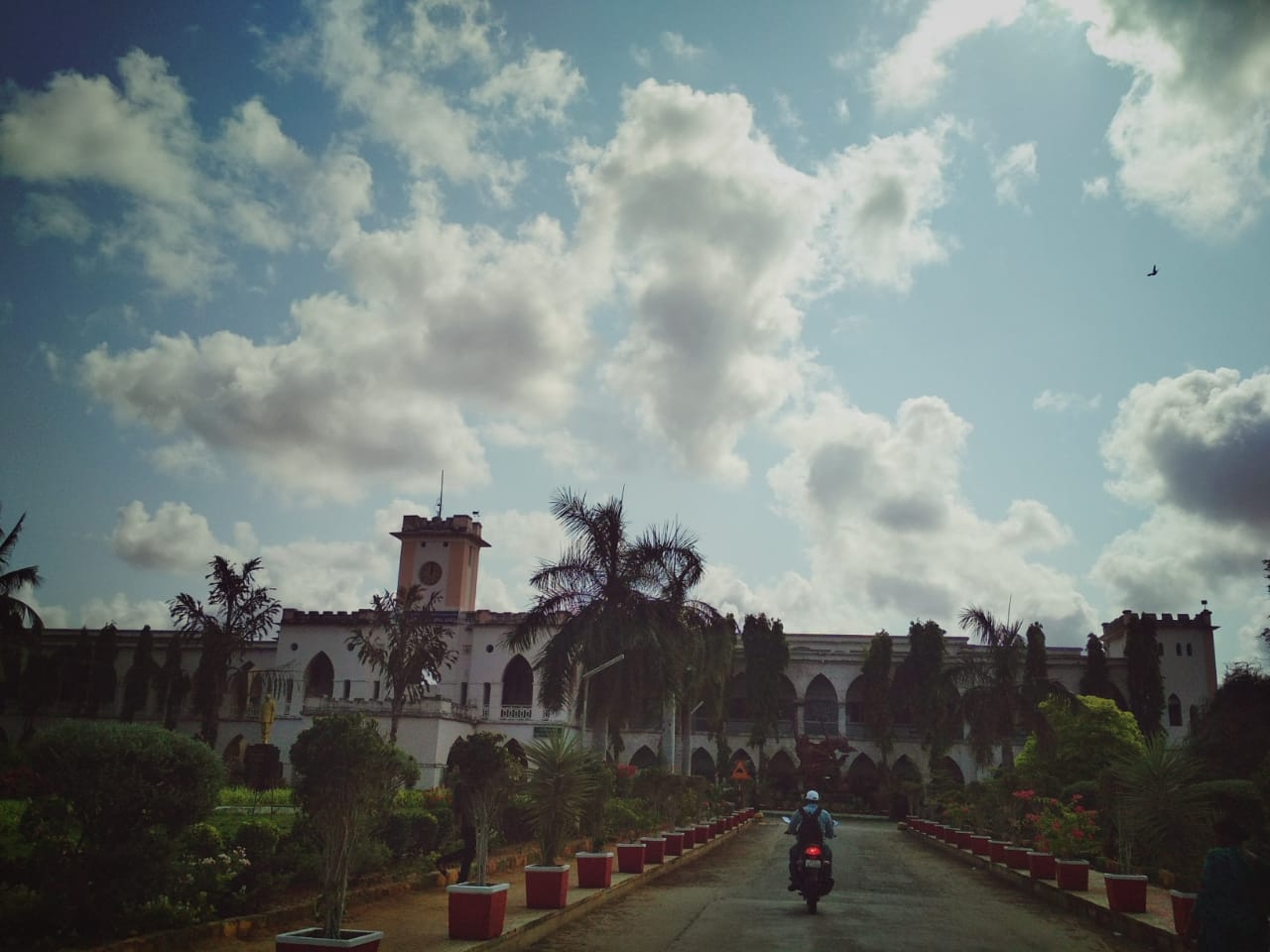
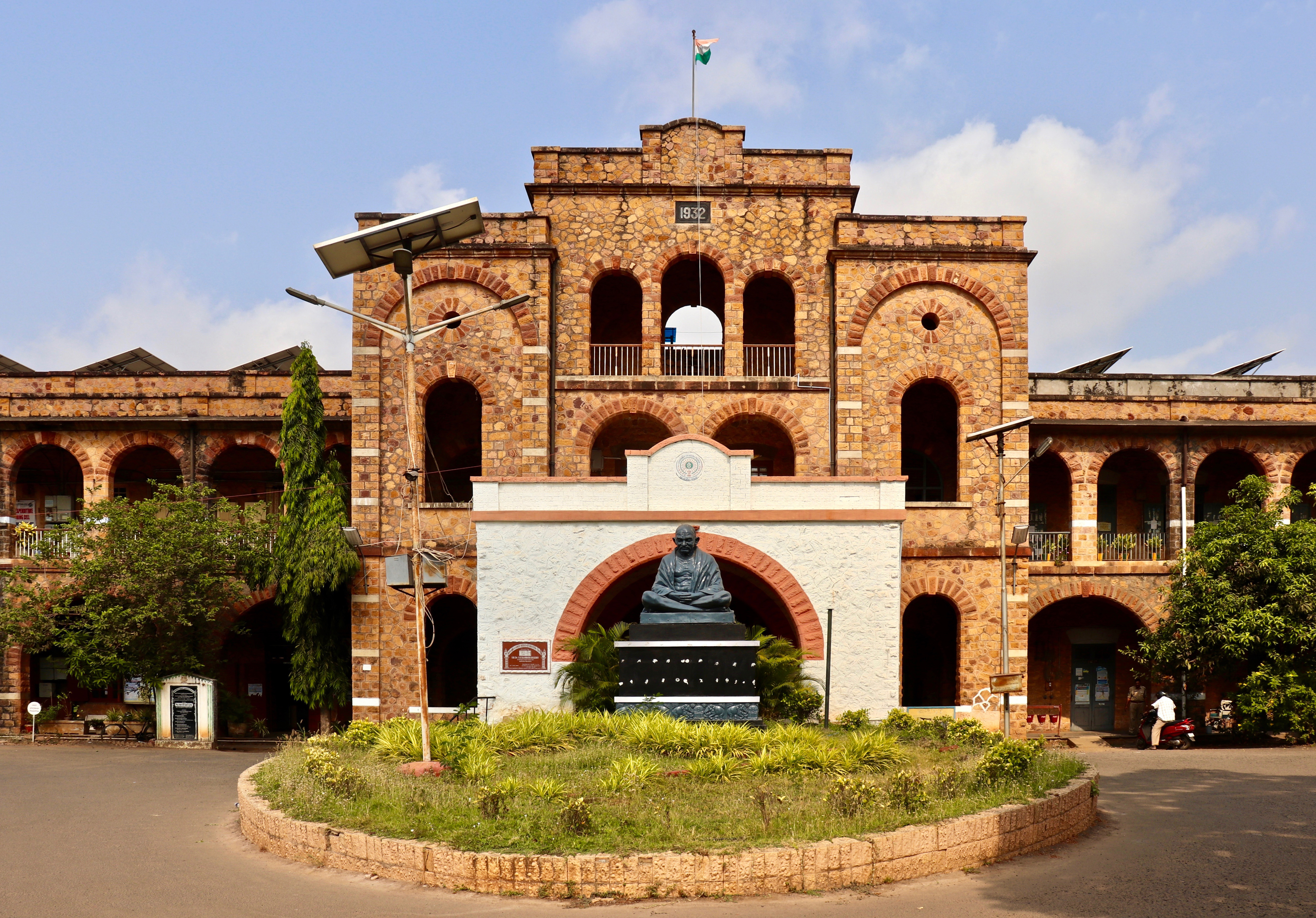
- Skyline of Visakhapatnam Kanaka Durga Temple, Vijayawada Machilipatnam beach Dhyana Buddha statue at Amaravathi Konaseema Agricultural College, Bapatla Eluru District Collectorate

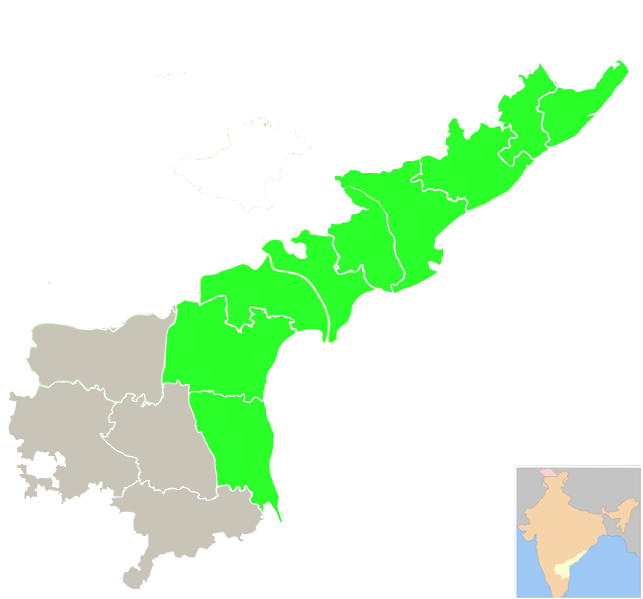
- Coastal Andhra region (old districts) highlighted in Andhra Pradesh
- Country: India
- State: Andhra Pradesh
- Districts: Srikakulam district; Vizianagaram district; Parvathipuram Manyam district; Alluri district; Polavaram district; Visakhapatnam district; Anakapalli district; Kakinada district; Konaseema district; East Godavari district; West Godavari district; Eluru district; NTR district; Krishna district; Guntur district; Palnadu district; Bapatla district; Prakasam district; SPSR Nellore district
- Largest city: Visakhapatnam
- Major Cities: Vijayawada; Guntur; Nellore; Rajamundry; Kakinada; Bhimavaram; Eluru; Tuni

Area
  - Total: 91,915 km^{2} (35,489 sq mi)

Population (2011)
  - Total: 34,195,655

Languages
  - Official: Telugu
- Time zone: UTC+05:30 (IST)
- Vehicle registration: AP05, AP06, AP07, AP08, AP16, AP18, AP26, AP27, AP37, AP39
- Largest airport: Alluri Sitarama Raju International Airport

Coastal Andhra, also known as Kosta Andhra (IAST: Kōstā Āndhra), is a geographic region in the Indian state of Andhra Pradesh, comprising the coastal districts of the state between the Eastern Ghats and the Bay of Bengal, from the northern border with Orissa to Rayalaseema in the south. It includes major cities Visakhapatnam, Vijayawada and Guntur City as well as the state capital Amaravati and is recognized for its fertile lands, rich cultural heritage, and economic importance. Coastal Andhra plays a significant role in the state's agricultural output, particularly in rice and tobacco production, supported by abundant water resources from the Godavari, Krishna, and Penna rivers.

While Coastal Andhra generally includes the districts along the Bay of Bengal, the Uttarandhra (Northern Andhra) area is sometimes regarded as distinct due to its unique cultural and historical background. Coastal Andhra shares borders with the Rayalaseema region of Andhra Pradesh and the state of Telangana. Covering an area of 91,915 square kilometres (35,489 sq mi), Coastal Andhra accounts for 58% of Andhra Pradesh's total area and, as per the 2011 Census of India, hosts a population of over 3.4 crore, constituting 69.20% of the state's population. Coastal Andhra was formerly part of the Madras State until 1953 and then became part of Andhra State from 1953 to 1956.

Historically, Coastal Andhra has been a centre of trade and culture, featuring strong traditions in literature, music, and dance. The region contributed actively to the Indian independence movement and continues to impact the state's economy through industries such as information technology, petroleum, and pharmaceuticals. It is also home to major ports in Visakhapatnam and Kakinada, enhancing its status as a critical industrial and trading hub. Proximity to the Bay of Bengal, however, makes the region susceptible to tropical cyclones and coastal erosion, prompting investments in disaster preparedness and coastal management initiatives.

== History ==
The region of Andhra emerged as a prominent political power during the Maurya Empire. Historical accounts by Greek ambassador Megasthenes (c. 310 BCE) reference Andhra as a flourishing region under the Satavahanas before the Common Era. The Satavahana dynasty dominated the Deccan Plateau from the 1st century BCE to the 3rd century CE. It had trade relations with the Roman Empire. The Satavahanas made Dhanyakataka-Amaravathi their capital. According to historian Stanley Wolpert, it might have been the most prosperous city in India in 2nd century CE.

Coastal Andhra was subsequently governed by the Eastern Chalukya dynasty between the 7th and 12th centuries CE, followed by successive rule under the Chola, Kakatiya, Reddys and Vijayanagara empires. According to 11th-century inscriptions, the geographical boundaries of Coastal Andhra extended from the Mahendragiri mountains in the northeastern border near Orissa's Gajapati district, to the Kalahasti Temple in Tirupati district, and the Srisailam Temple in Nandyal district.

In the mid-18th century, the Gajapati and Ganjam districts, which were part of Coastal Andhra, were granted to the French East India Company in 1752 but were later transferred to British control. Nellore, including areas reaching up to Ongole Taluk, came under British administration after being acquired from the Nawab of Arcot. Additionally, certain parts of present-day Nellore and Chittoor were managed by the Venkatagiri Rajas until 1802, when the British entered into an arrangement with the Raja of Venkatagiri, consolidating their control over these territories.

The Coastal Andhra districts, historically known as the Northern Circars, along with the Rayalaseema region, were ceded by the Nizam of Hyderabad to the British colonial administration, becoming part of the Madras Presidency under British rule.

== Geography ==
Coastal Andhra is situated in the eastern region of the Indian state of Andhra Pradesh, along the Circar Coast. It covers an area of 91,915 square kilometres (35,489 sq mi). It comprises 19 districts: Srikakulam, Vizianagaram, Parvathipuram Manyam, Alluri Sitarama Raju, Polavaram, Visakhapatnam, Anakapalli, Kakinada, Konaseema, East Godavari, West Godavari, Eluru, Krishna, NTR, Guntur, Palnadu, Bapatla, Prakasam, and Nellore.

The region borders the Rayalaseema region within Andhra Pradesh and shares boundaries with the state of Telangana. Fertile lands in Coastal Andhra are supported by the presence of three major rivers: the Godavari, Krishna, and Penna, which enhance agricultural productivity through extensive irrigation systems.

The coastal length of this region spans approximately 974 km, making it the second-longest coastline in India.

== Demographics ==
According to the 2011 Census of India, Coastal Andhra has a total population of 34,195,655 constituting 69.20% of the state's population.

The majority of the population in Coastal Andhra practices Hinduism, accounting for approximately 93% of the residents. The Christian community represents around 1.51% of the region's population.

The primary language spoken across Coastal Andhra is Telugu.

== Culture ==
Kuchipudi is the classical dance form of the state, which was originated in the Kuchipudi village of Krishna district.

=== Cuisine ===
Rice is the staple food in the coastal cuisine and is usually consumed with a variety of curries and lentil soups or broths. The cuisine of Coastal Andhra is influenced by various seafood varieties.

== Politics ==
The Coastal Andhra region of Andhra Pradesh comprises 20 districts: Srikakulam, Vizianagaram, Parvathipuram Manyam, Polavarm, Alluri Sitharama Raju, Visakhapatnam, Anakapalli, Kakinada, Konaseema, East Godavari, West Godavari, Eluru, Krishna, NTR, Guntur, Palnadu, Bapatla, Prakasam and Nellore.

Many Chief Ministers from the region have held office in Andhra Pradesh and Andhra State. They are:

- Tanguturi Prakasam Panthulu – 1st Chief Minister of Andhra State (Prakasam)
- Bezawada Gopala Reddy – 2nd Chief Minister of Andhra State (Nellore)
- Kasu Brahmananda Reddy – 5th Chief Minister of Andhra Pradesh (Palnadu)
- Bhavanam Venkatarami Reddy – 10th Chief Minister of Andhra Pradesh (Guntur)
- N. T. Rama Rao – 12th Chief Minister of Andhra Pradesh (Krishna)
- Nadendla Bhaskara Rao – 13th Chief Minister of Andhra Pradesh (Guntur)
- K. Rosaiah – 17th Chief Minister of Andhra Pradesh (Bapatla)

== Cities and towns ==
Visakhapatnam, Vijayawada, Guntur, Nellore, Kakinada, Rajahmundry, Tuni and Eluru are prominent cities in the Coastal Andhra region. Other major urban centers include Gudivada, Tenali, Narasaraopeta, Bhimavaram, Machilipatnam, Ongole, and Tadepalligudem. Important towns in the area include Chirala, Amalapuram, Palakollu, Narasapuram, Kavali, Chilakaluripet, Kandukur, Bantumilli, Razole, Kaikalur, Gannavaram, Repalle, and Bapatla.

Visakhapatnam is the most populous city in the region, while Amaravati, serving as the state capital, is also situated within Coastal Andhra.

== Tourism ==
=== Buddhist hub ===
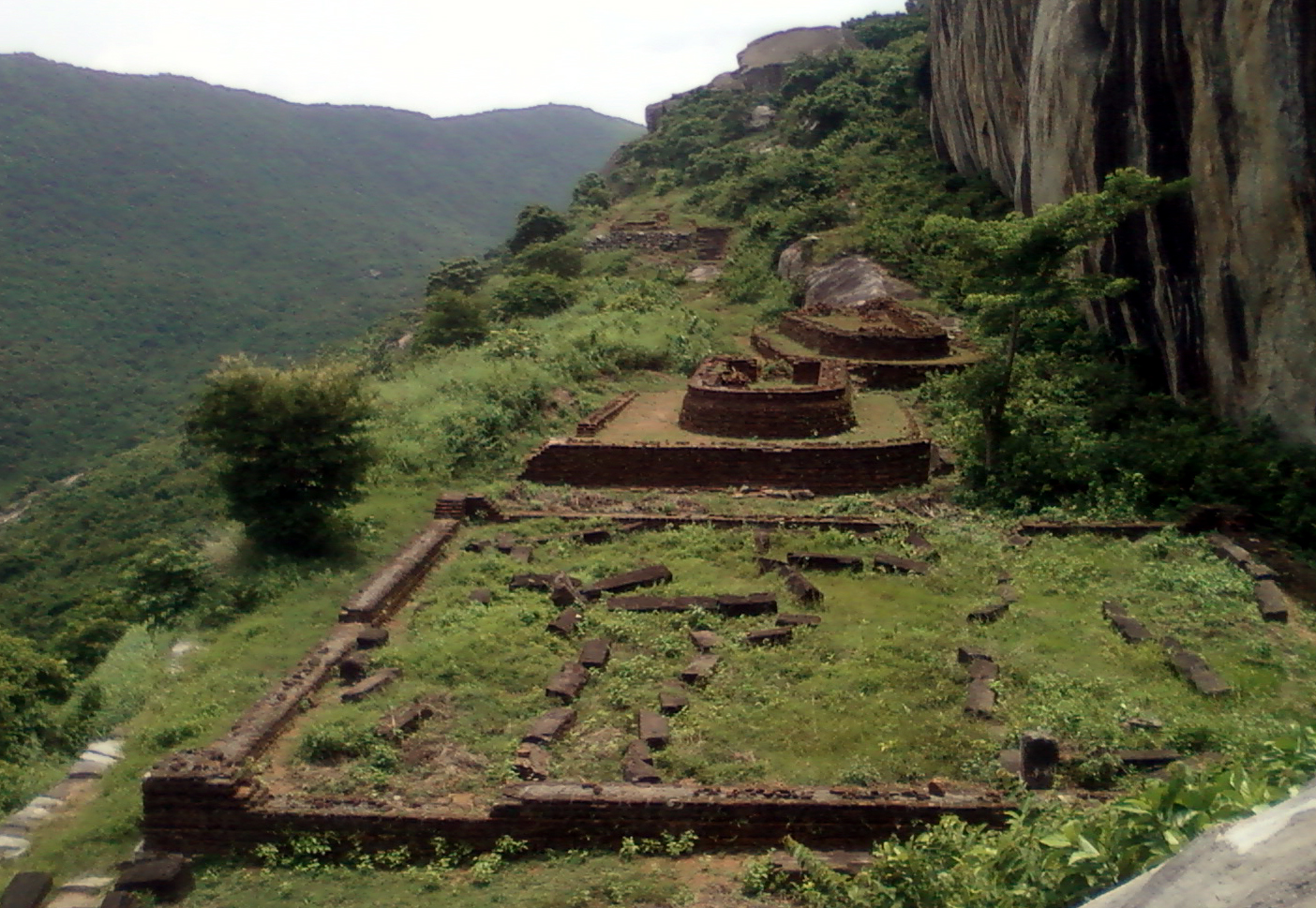
Buddhist monastery remnants at Ramatheertham

Coastal Andhra is a prominent hub for Buddhist heritage in India, second only to the Gangetic plains of Bihar and Uttar Pradesh. The region holds numerous ancient Buddhist sites, featuring remnants of large monasteries, stupas, and other significant artifacts that span from Srikakulam district in the north to Nellore district in the south. Key sites include Amaravathi, Salihundam, Ramatheertham, Thotlakonda, Bavikonda, Bojjannakonda, Kummarilova, Kodavali, and Bhattiprolu. Excavations at Gudiwada village in Vizianagaram district for instance, uncovered an ancient stupa mound, reflecting the depth of Buddhist influence across the region.

=== Rivers, lakes and wetlands ===
Coastal Andhra is also noted for its diverse landscapes of rivers, lakes, and wetlands. The region contains 259 coastal wetlands, covering approximately 18,552 square kilometers, including 88 man-made wetlands. Kolleru Lake, a significant natural freshwater lake situated in West Godavari district, functions as a flood-balancing reservoir for the Godavari and Krishna rivers and supports up to 50,000 resident and migratory birds. Recognized as a wildlife sanctuary in 1999 under India's Wildlife Protection Act, Kolleru Lake was designated a Ramsar wetland of international importance in 2002. Additionally, the Godavari River splits into distributaries such as the Gouthami, Vasishta, Vainatheya, and Vruddha Gouthami before reaching the Bay of Bengal, creating an intricate riverine landscape across Coastal Andhra.

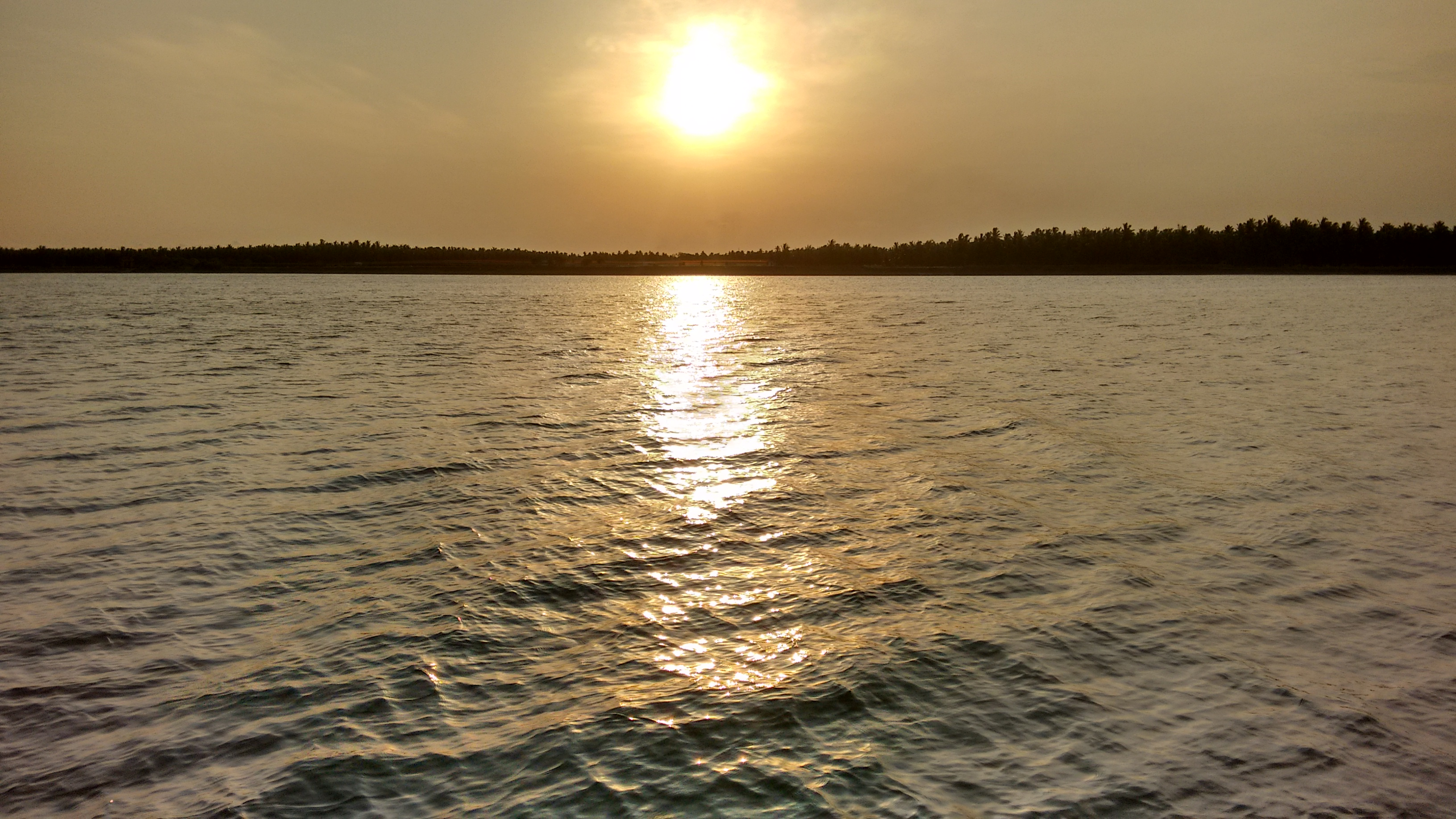
Godavari River at Palakollu, West Godavari District in the evening

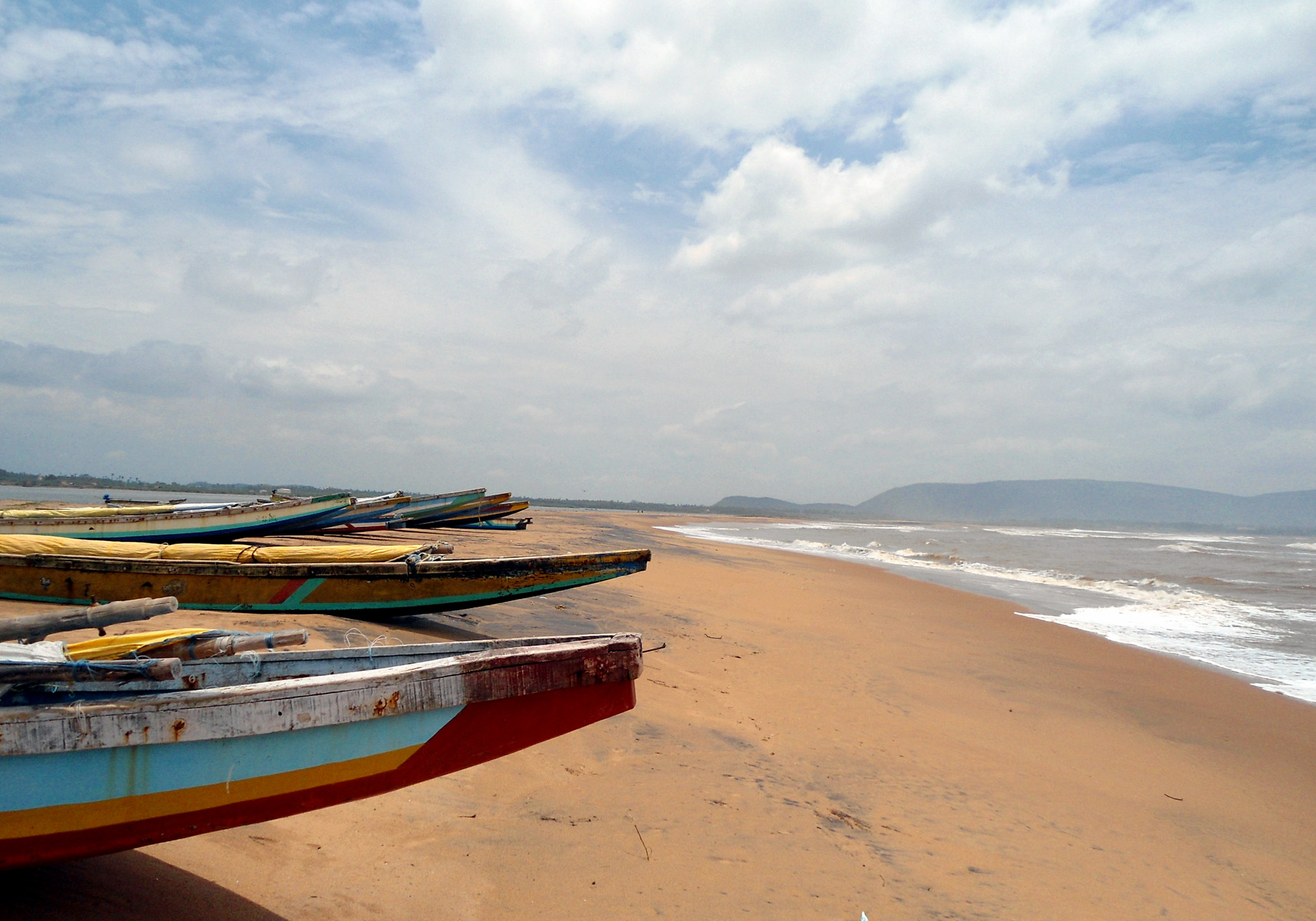
Boats at Bhimili (Bheemunipatnam) beach in Visakhapatnam District

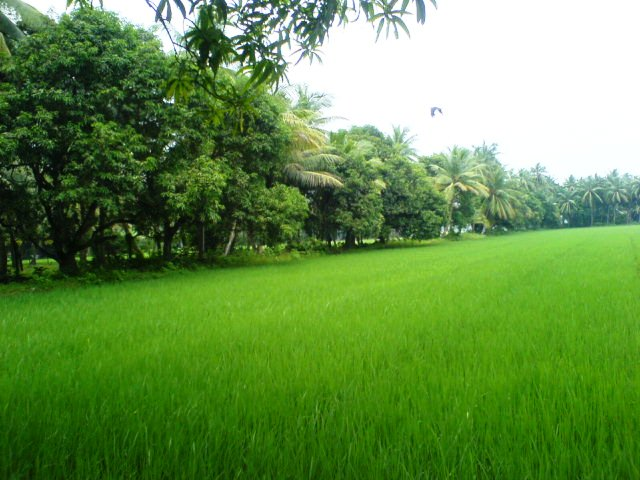
Lush green farms in East Godavari

== Transport ==
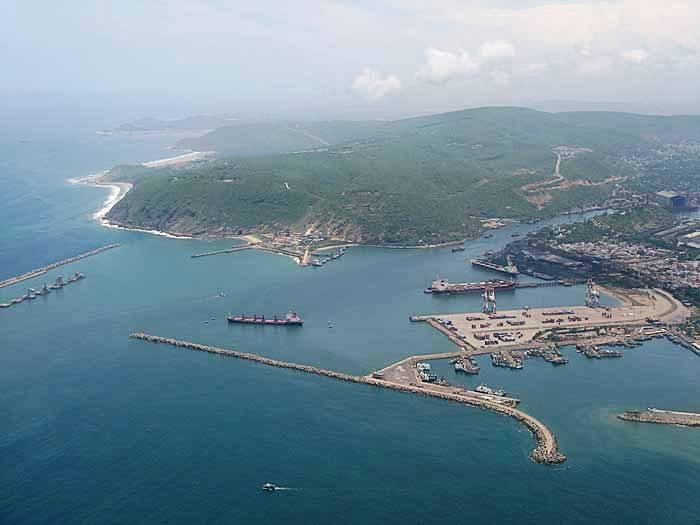
Aerial view of Vizag Sea Port

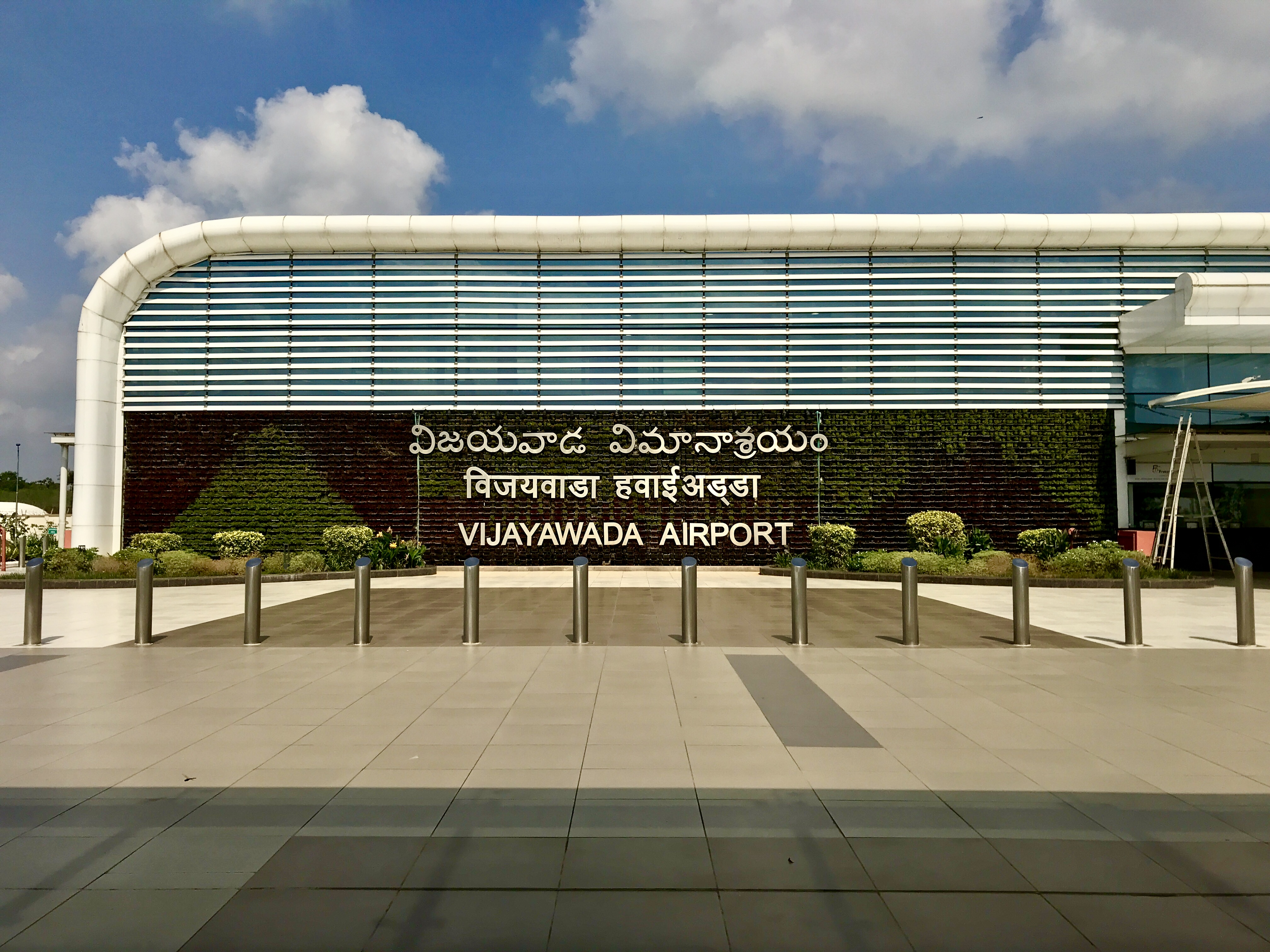
Vijayawada Airport Terminal

Coastal Andhra is well-connected by various modes of transportation, including air, rail, and road networks, playing a crucial role in the region's connectivity and economy.

The region's railway infrastructure includes several major stations such as Vijayawada railway station, one of the busiest railway junctions in India, along with other key stations in Rajahmundry, Kakinada Town, Gudivada Junction railway station, Narsapuram, Machilipatnam, Guntur, Tenali, Nellore, and Repalle. Vijayawada serves as a central hub for numerous trains originating from and passing through the region.

In terms of road transport, Pandit Nehru Bus Station (PNBS) in Vijayawada is one of the largest bus terminals in the country, handling a high volume of passengers. Buses operate from various towns and cities in the region, further connecting the area with major destinations across Andhra Pradesh and beyond.

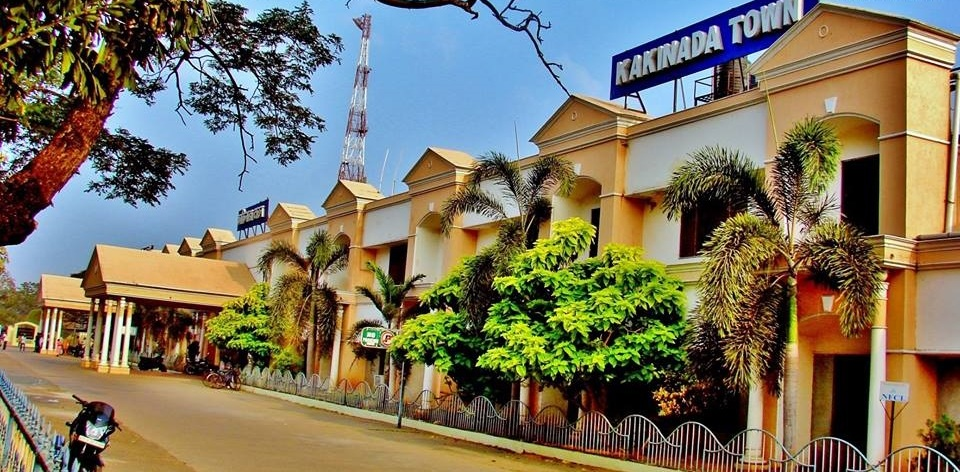
Kakinada Town railway station main entrance

Air connectivity is provided by Visakhapatnam International Airport, Vijayawada International Airport and Rajahmundry Airport, which serve both domestic and limited international flights. Additionally, Nellore Airport is currently under construction to enhance air travel access to the region.

Coastal Andhra is also home to several major ports, vital for the region's trade and commerce. Kakinada Port is a significant seaport, while Visakhapatnam Port is one of the busiest cargo-handling ports in India. Krishnapatnam Port at Nellore is a major private port in the region, and smaller ports such as Machilipatnam Port and Nizampatnam Port in Bapatla district further contribute to maritime trade. Andhra Pradesh is the second-busiest maritime state in India in terms of cargo handled, following Gujarat.

== Notable personalities ==
National flag design

- Pingali Venkayya

Singers

- M. Balamuralikrishna
- P. B. Srinivas
- S. P. Balasubrahmanyam
- S. Janaki
- P. Susheela

Telugu literature, arts and cinema

- Nannayya
- Tikkana
- Tenali Ramakrishna
- Gurajada Apparao
- Kandukuri Veeresalingam
- Devulapalli Venkata Krishna Sastri
- Tripuraneni Ramaswamy Chowdary
- Gurram Jashuva
- S. V. Ranga Rao
- Ghantasala
- Pingali Venkayya
- N. T. Rama Rao
- Akkineni Nageswara Rao
- Krishna
- Chiranjeevi
- Nandamuri Balakrishna
- Pawan Kalyan
- Goparaju Ramachandra Rao
- Prabhas
- S. S. Rajamouli

== See also ==
- Northern Circars
- Rayalaseema
- Uttarandhra
- List of districts of Andhra Pradesh by regions
