= GWM =

GWM or gwm may refer to:

- Great Wall Motor, a Chinese automobile manufacturer
- Awngthim language (ISO 639-3 code), Queensland, Australia
- Gannavaram railway station (Indian Railways station code), Andhra Pradesh, India
