= Tagarapuvalasa =

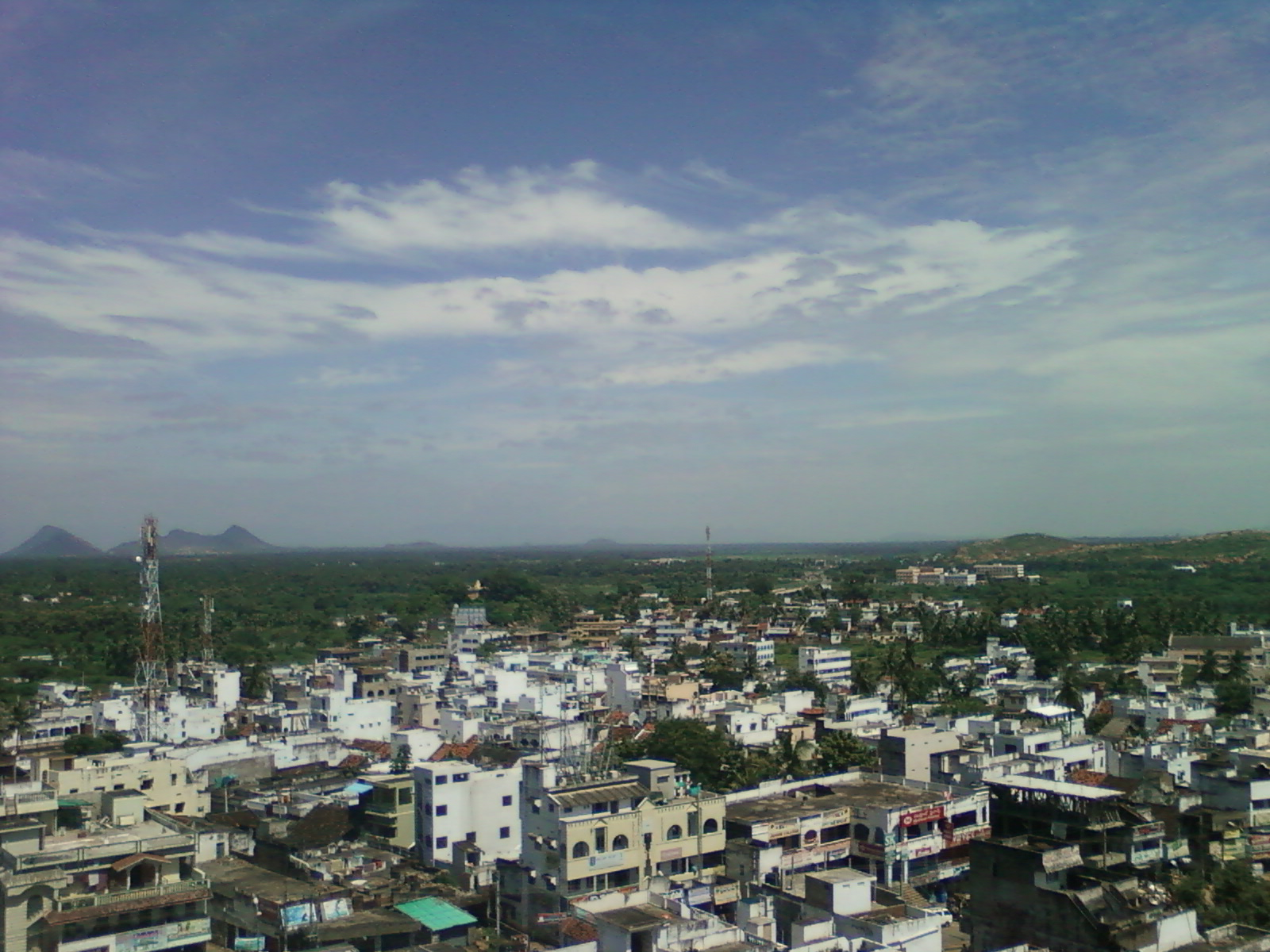
- View of Thagarapuvalasa Town

- Location in Visakhapatnam
- Coordinates: 17°55′52″N 83°25′44″E
- Country: India
- State: Andhra Pradesh
- District: Visakhapatnam
- Mandal: Bheemunipatnam

Government
  - Type: Municipal Corporation
  - Body: GVMC

Telugu Languages
  - Official: Telugu
- Time zone: UTC+5:30 (IST)
- PIN: 531162
- Telephone code: +91-8933-XXX XXX
- Vehicle registration: AP-31

Tagarapuvalasa is a neighbourhood on the banks of River Gosthani is a part of Bheemunipatnam Municipality (BMC) in Andhra Pradesh. It is located on the Kolkata–Chennai National Highway 16.
National Highway 43 diverts from Maharajupeta village north of Tagarapuvalasa.

== History ==
Traces of habitation and early trade in and around Tagarapuvalasa may be dated back to 3rd century BC or more as many Early Buddhist sites such as Pavurallakonda, Gudiwada Dibba, Cherukupalli Gutta and Pellikonda, are explored, documented and excavated near to this town along the River Gosthani. This area once flourished as Madhyama Kalinga region.

== Geography ==
Tagarapuvalasa and Chittivalasa are twin towns and located at 17°55′52″N 83°25′44″E.

== Transport ==
APSRTC routes

Route number	Start	End	Via
222	Tagarapuvalasa/Chittivalasa Jn.	Railway Station/RTC Complex	Anandapuram, Madhurawada, Yendada, Hanumanthuwaka, Maddilapalem
222V	Vizianagaram	RTC Complex	Tagarapuvalasa/Chittivalasa Jn., Anandapuram, Madhurawada, Yendada, Hanumanthuwaka, Maddilapalem
111	Tagarapuvalasa/Chittivalasa Jn.	Kurmannapalem	Anandapuram, Madhurawada, Yendada, Hanumanthuwaka, Maddilapalem, RTC Complex, Jagadamba Centre, Town Kotharoad, Convent, Scindia, Malkapuram, Gajuwaka
111V	Vizianagaram	Kurmannapalem	Tagarapuvalasa/Chittivalasa Jn., Anandapuram, Madhurawada, Yendada, Hanumanthuwaka, Maddilapalem, RTC Complex, Jagadamba Centre, Town Kotharoad, Convent, Scindia, Malkapuram, Gajuwaka
211	Vizianagaram	Visakhapatnam Railway Station	Tagarapuvalasa/Chittivalasa Jn., Anandapuram, Madhurawada, Yendada, Hanumanthuwaka, Maddilapalem, RTC Complex
900T	Tagarapuvalasa/Chittivalasa	RTC Complex	Bhimili, Thimmapuram, Rushikonda, Appughar, Pedawaltair, Siripuram, RTC Complex
888	Tagarapuvalasa/Chittivalasa Jn.	Anakapalli	Anandapuram, Gudilova, Shontyam, Pendurthi, Sabbavaram, Sankaram
55T	Tagarapuvalasa/Chittivalasa Jn.	Scindia	Anandapuram, Gudilova, Shontyam, Pendurthi, Vepagunta, Gopalapatnam, NAD Kotharoad, Airport, BHPV, Gajuwaka, Malkapuram
