= Marlapalem =

- village
- Interactive map of Marlapalem
- Location in Andhra Pradesh, India Marlapalem (India)
- Coordinates: 16°33′12″N 80°48′30″E
- Country: India
- State: Andhra Pradesh
- District: Krishna
- Talukas: Gannavaram

Languages
  - Official: Telugu
- Time zone: UTC+5:30 (IST)
- PIN: 521101

Marlapalem is a village in Gannavaram Mandal in Krishna district of Andhra Pradesh, India.
