= Gannavaram Assembly constituency =

Gannavaram could refer to one of the following constituencies of the Andhra Pradesh Legislative Assembly:

- Gannavaram, Krishna Assembly constituency, in Krishna district
- Gannavaram, Konaseema Assembly constituency, in Konaseema district

== See also ==
- Gannavaram (disambiguation)
