= Mustabada railway station =

Railway station in Andhra Pradesh, India

Mustabada
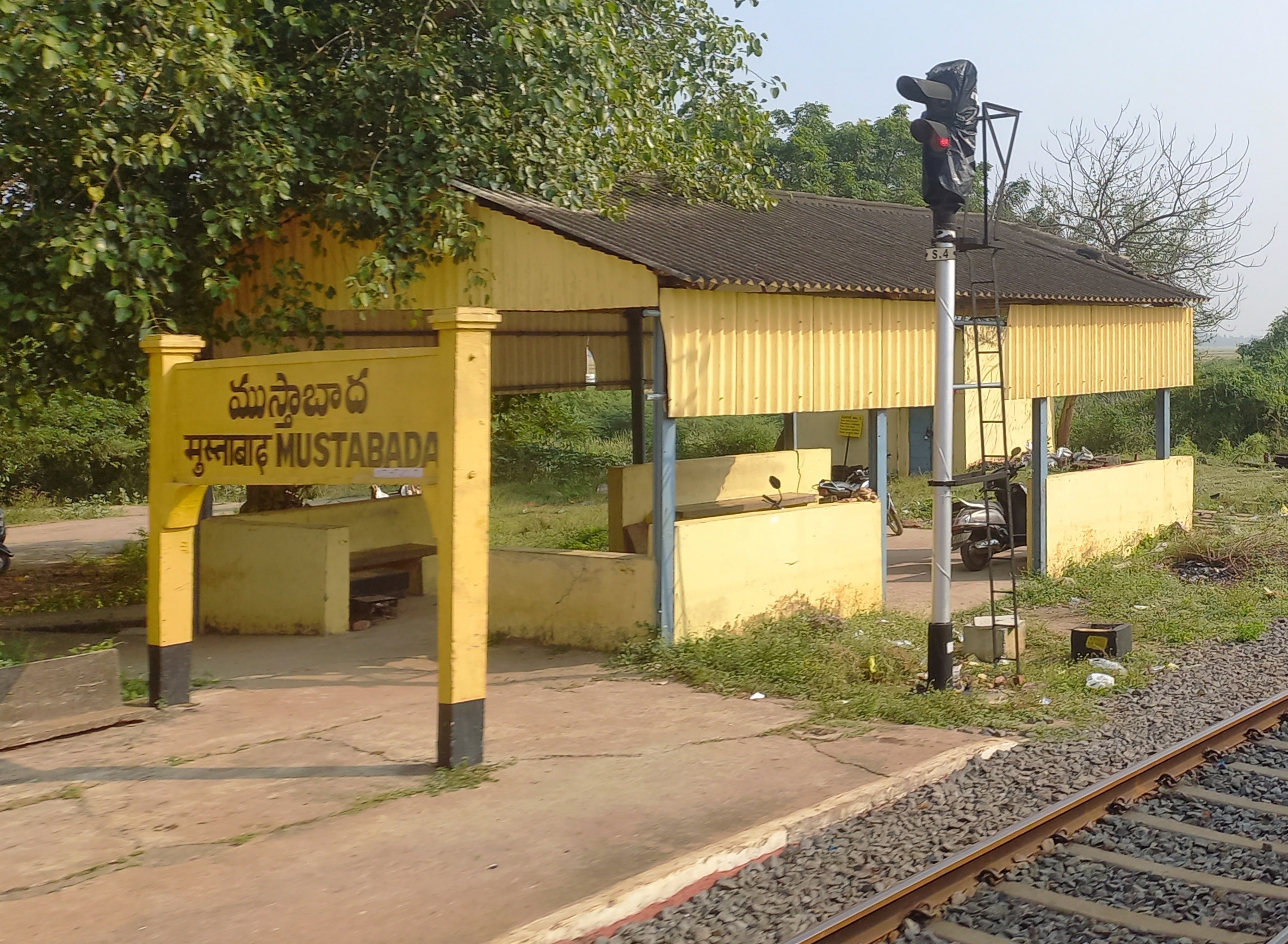

General information
- Location: Mustabada, Vijayawada, Krishna district, Andhra Pradesh; India
- Coordinates: 16°14′33″N 80°38′24″E
- System: Commuter, Inter-city and Regional rail station
- Owner: Indian Railways
- Operator: Indian Railways
- Lines: Howrah–Chennai main line; Duvvada–Vijayawada section
- Platforms: 3

Construction
- Structure type: Standard (on ground)
- Accessible: Disabled access

Other information
- Station code: MBD
- Zone(s): SCoR
- Division(s): Vijayawada
- Classification: Non-Suburban Grade-6 (NSG-6)

History
- Opened: 1899
- Electrified: 1980–81

Services
Preceding station	Indian Railways	Following station
Gannavaram towards ?	Duvvada–Vijayawada section	Gunadala towards ?
Route map
- Sources: Google maps, India Rail Info 57226, Visakhapatnam-Machilipatnam passenger, Machilipatnam Vijayawada DEMU, Kakinada-Kotipalli Rail Car, Narsapur Hyerabad Express; Narsapur-Bhimavaram Passenger
Location
- Location within Andhra Pradesh Location within India
- Interactive map

Mustabada railway station (station code:MBD) is an Indian Railways station is located in Mustabada, Vijayawada and a satellite station of Vijayawada in Andhra Pradesh. It is situated on Duvvada–Vijayawada section of Howrah–Chennai main line and is administered by Vijayawada railway division in South Coast Railway zone. There is also a proposal for a special bypass line to connect the station with Rayanapadu for freight transport.

== Classification ==
Mustabada railway station is categorized as a Non-Suburban Grade-6 (NSG-6) station in the Vijayawada railway division.
