= Gudiwada Dibba, Vizianagaram =

Gudiwada Dibba
- Documented Buddhist Site
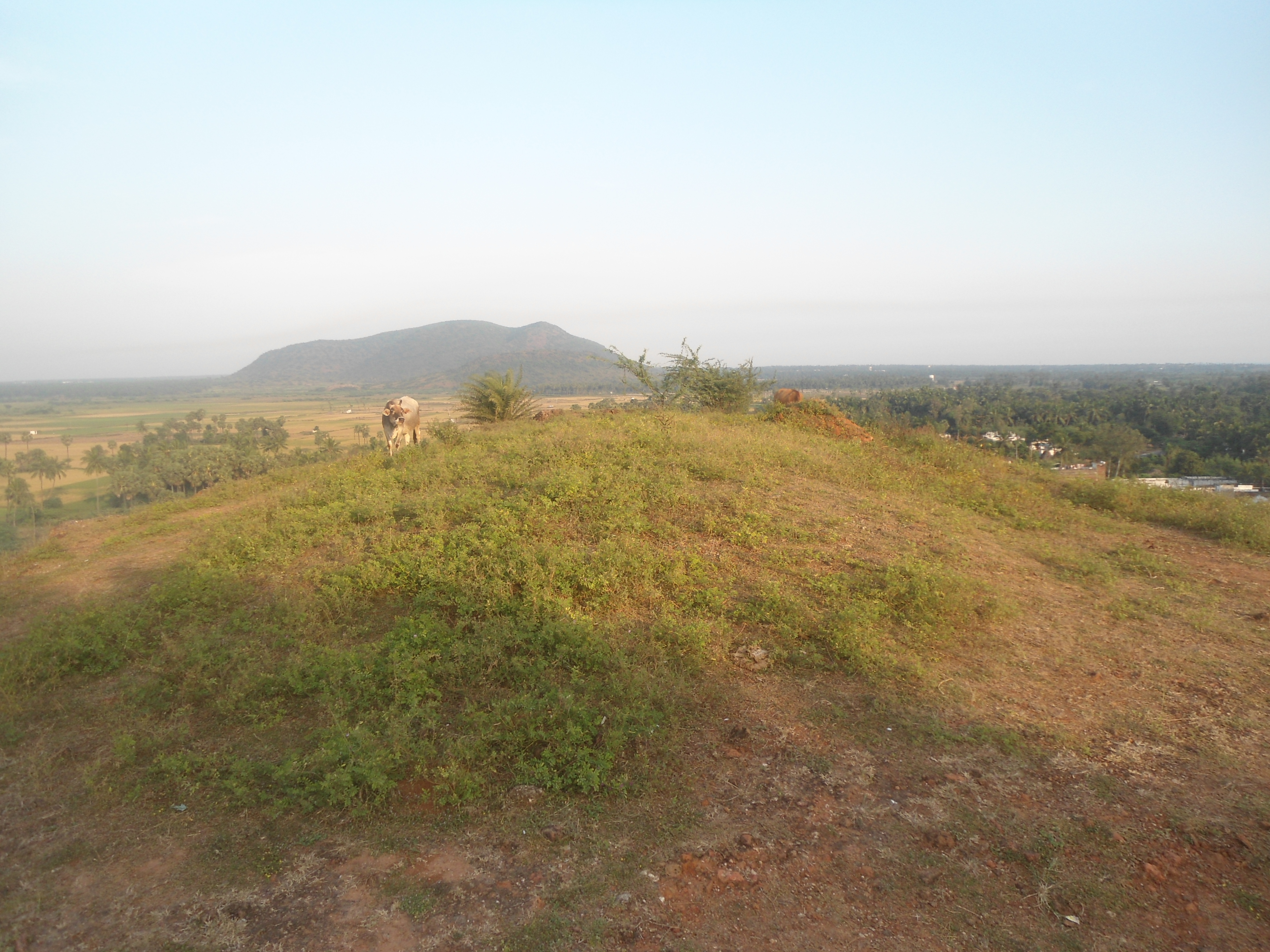
- Buddhist Stupa Mound at Gudiwada Dibba

- Location in Andhra Pradesh, India
- Coordinates: 17°56′21″N 83°25′57″E
- Country: India
- State: Andhra Pradesh
- District: Vizianagaram

Languages
  - Official: Telugu
- Time zone: UTC+5:30 (IST)
- Nearest city: Visakhapatnam

Gudiwada Dibba is a small hillock at Gudiwada village in Bhogapuram mandal, Vizianagaram district, Andhra Pradesh. It located on the banks of River Gosthani.

== Exploration of the Site ==
Explorations on this hillock (Gudiwada Dibba) in October 2012 yielded an ancient Buddhist heritage site possibly of 2nd Century BC. The site was documented by the State Archaeological department of Andhra Pradesh.

== Description of the Site ==
The Hillock is formed of 2 flat terraces. The upper terrace towards the east consists of Buddhist Stupa remnants and a small rock cut cistern. The lower terrace towards the west consists of Buddhist Vihara remnants and two Hindu temples (probably constructed 100 years ago) dedicated to Goddess Durga. Rock cut steps are present towards River Gosthani at the west end of the hillock. This site has some resemblance to Pavurallakonda and Thotlakonda Buddhist site in the near Vicinity. It is 6 km away from Bheemunipatnam. Gudiwada Dibba Buddhist site is present very near to the commercial town of Thagarapuvalasa and Chittivalasa of Visakhapatnam district.

== Gallery ==
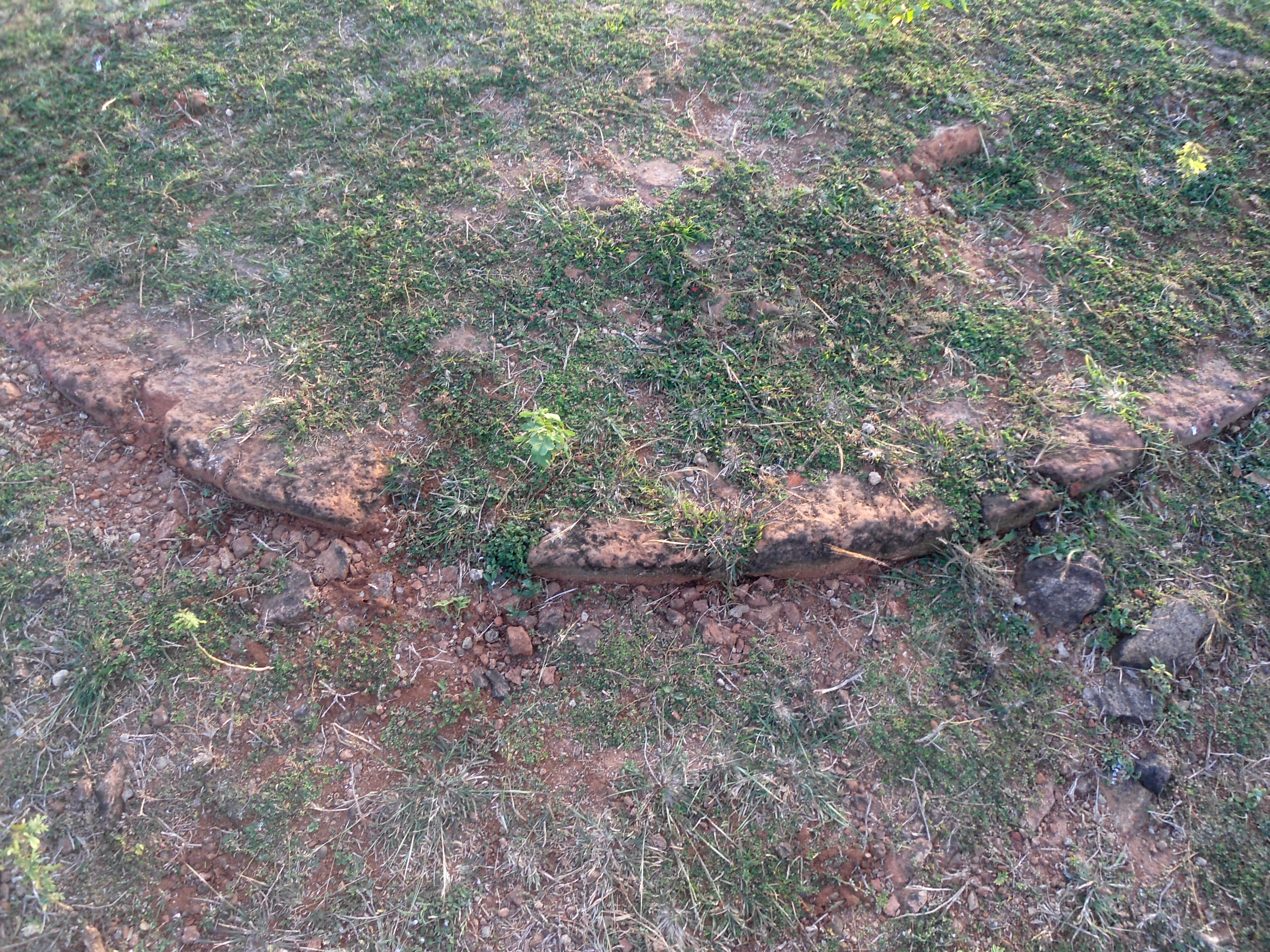
Brick outline of Stupa at Gudiwada Dibba

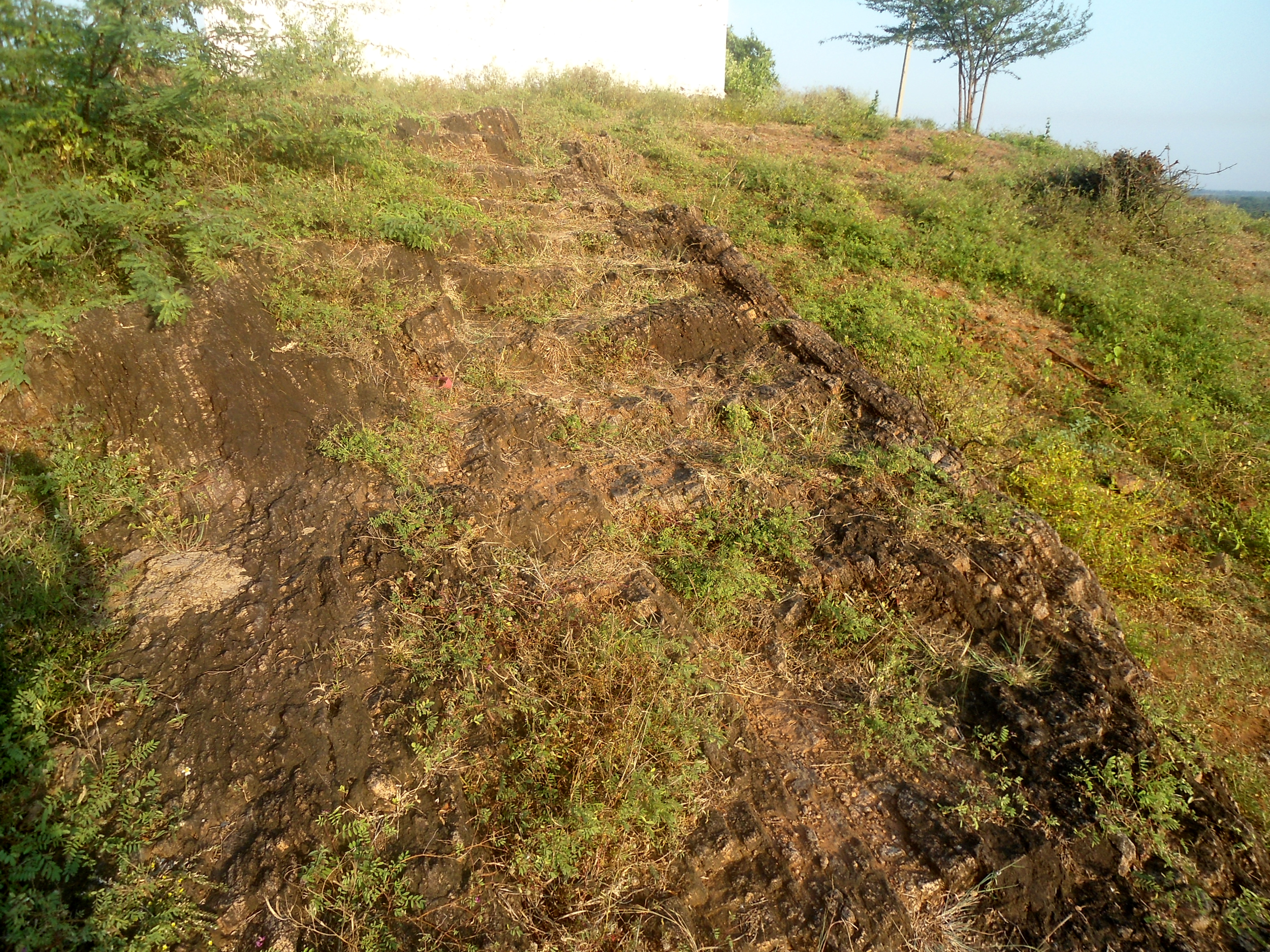
Rock cut steps at Gudiwada Dibba

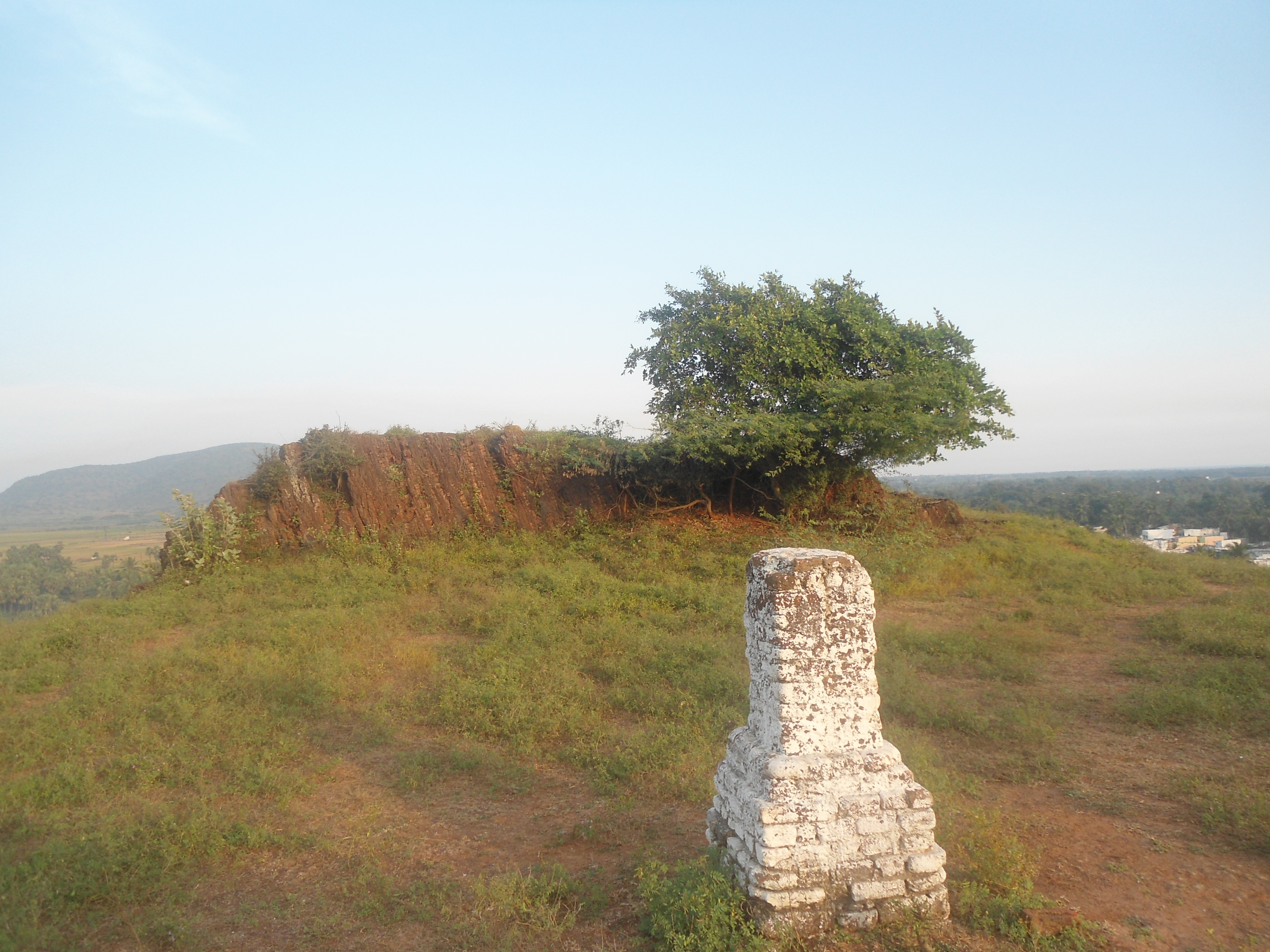
View of Terrace at Gudiwada dibba

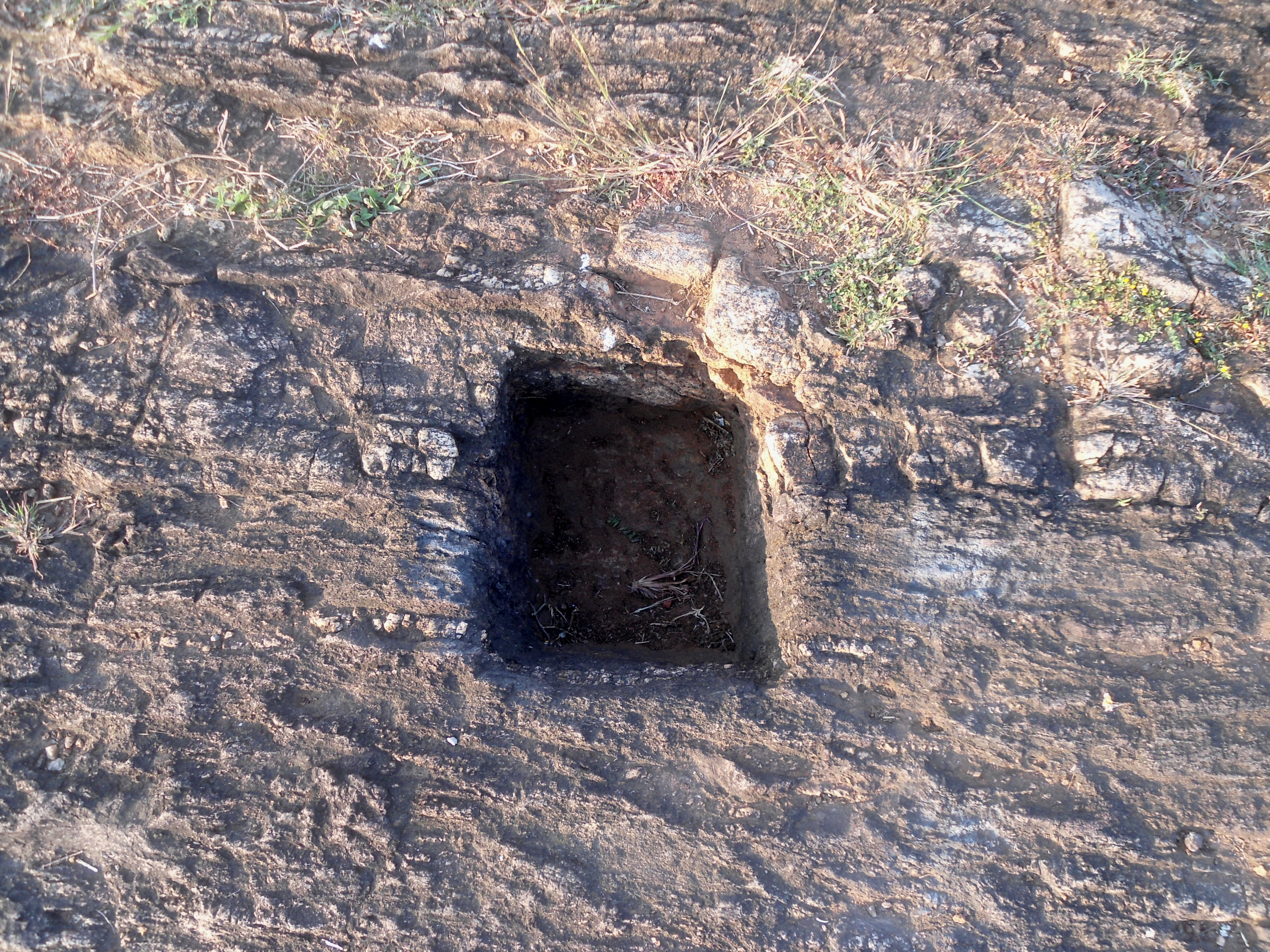
Rock cut cistern at Gudiwada Dibba

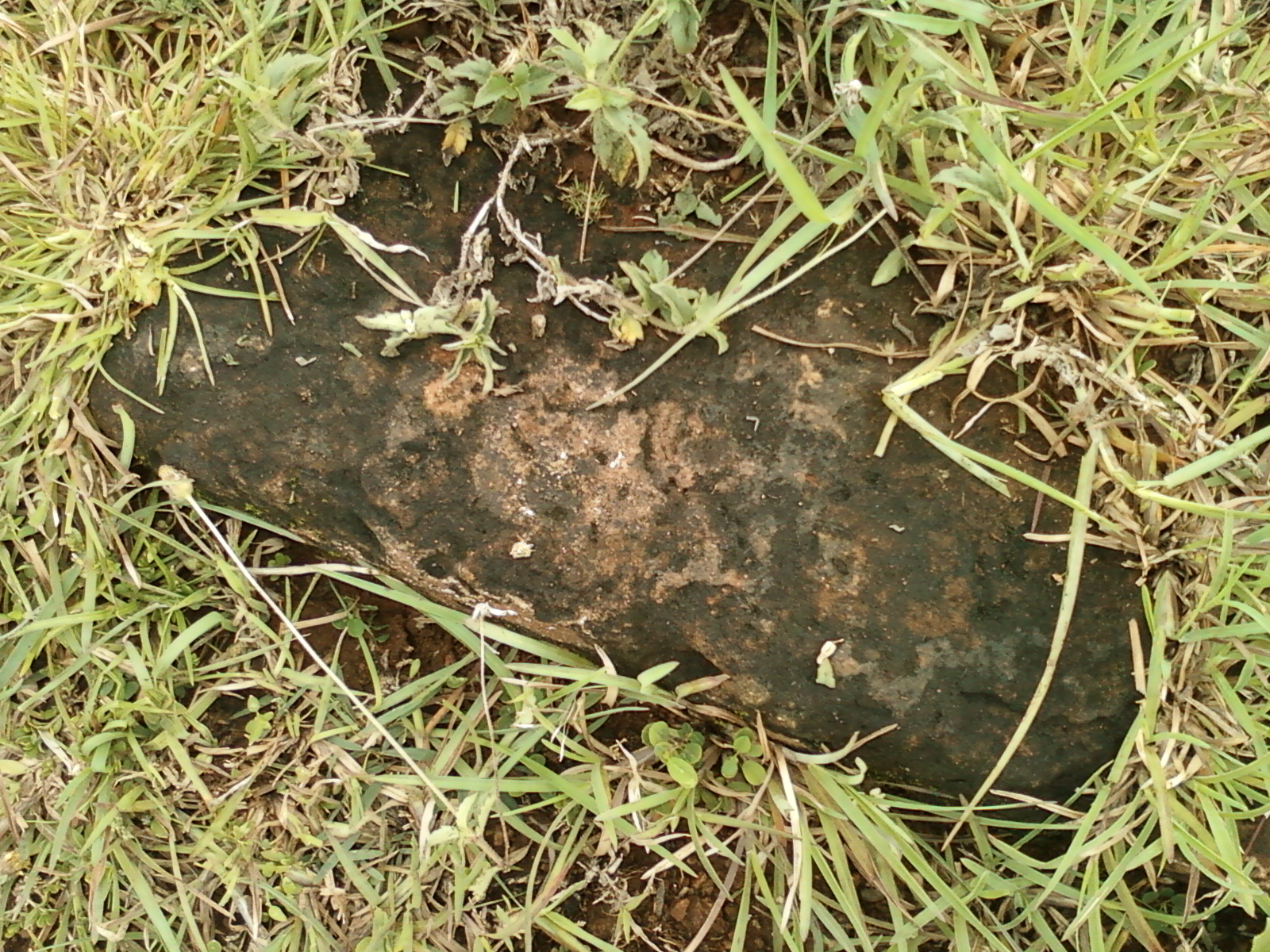
Brick ruins at Gudiwada Dibba
