= Gannavaram bus station =

Bus station in Andhra Pradesh, India

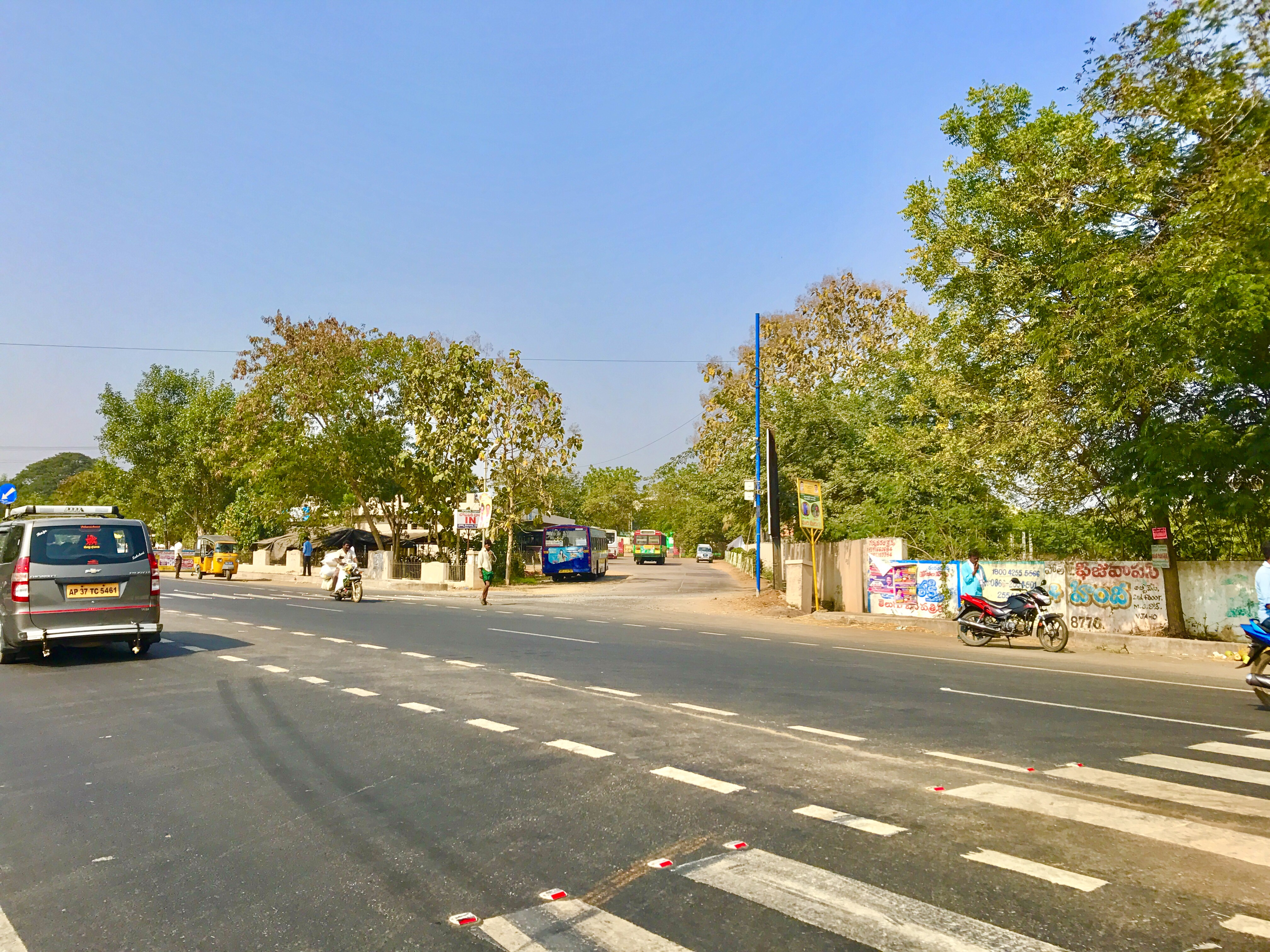
- Bus station from AH-45

General information
- Location: Gannavaram, Vijayawada, Krishna district, Andhra Pradesh; India
- Owner: Government of India
- Operator: APSRTC

Construction
- Structure type: Standard (On ground)
- Parking: Yes

Gannavaram bus station is a bus station in Gannavaram in Vijayawada of the Indian state of Andhra Pradesh. It is owned and operated by Andhra Pradesh State Road Transport Corporation. The station is also equipped with a bus depot for storage and maintenance of buses.

APSRTC operates city bus services from different parts of the city and it also operates buses outside city to Hyderabad and Eluru.
