= Gosthani River =

River in India

Gosthani
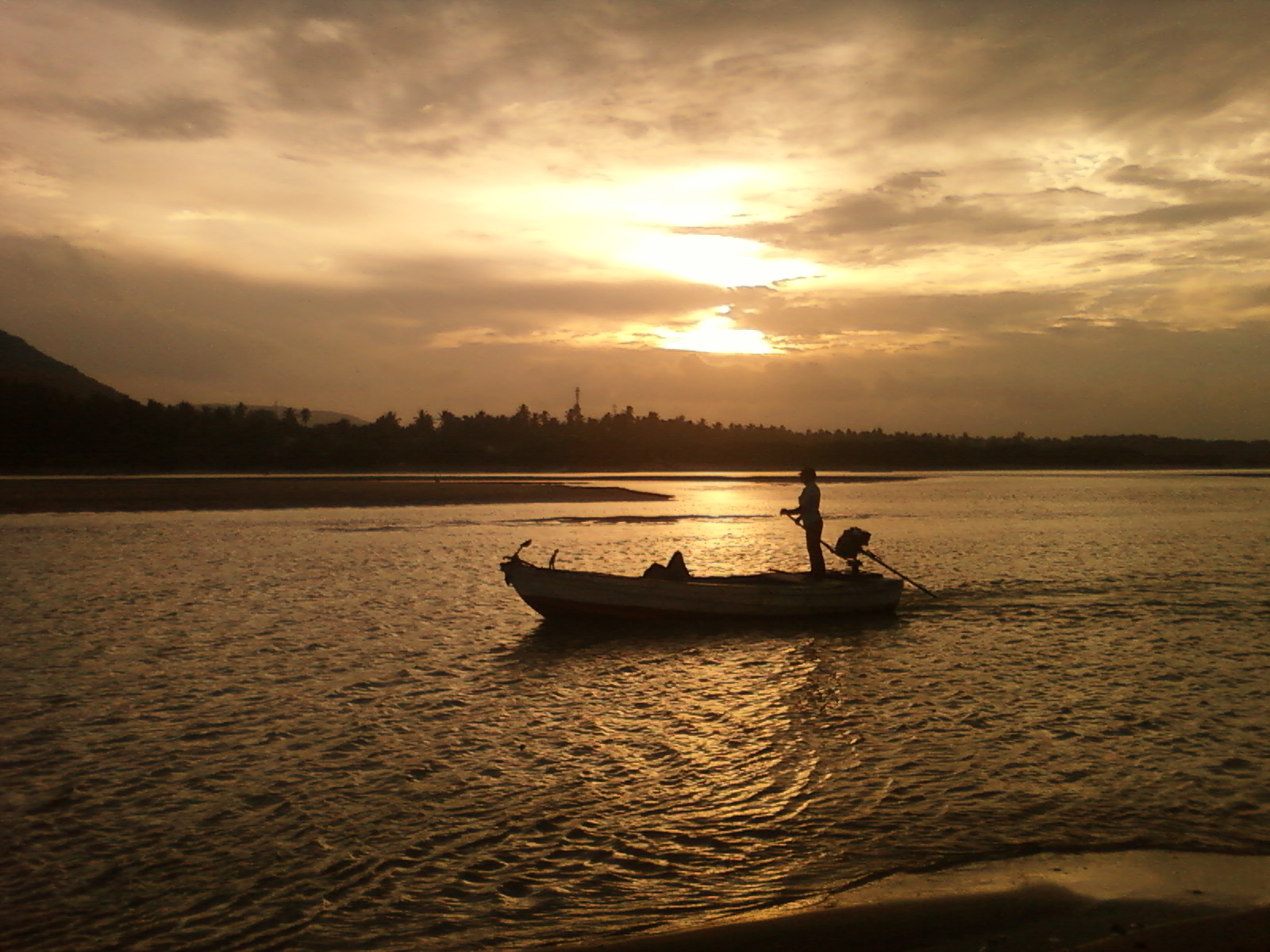
- Boat in River Gosthani at Bheemunipatnam
- Course of the Gosthani River

Location
- Country: India
- State: Andhra Pradesh

Physical characteristics
- Mouth: Bay of Bengal
  - location: Bheemunipatnam
  - coordinates: 17°53′43″N 83°27′15″E

Basin features
- Cities: Thagarapuvalasa

The Gosthani River is a river in India. It rises in the Ananthagiri Hills of the Eastern Ghats and flows through the Borra Caves which lie near its source. It is the largest river flowing through Visakhapatnam city. It flows for 120 km before joining the Bay of Bengal through an estuary near Bheemunipatnam. The river basin drains the two coastal districts of Vizianagaram and Visakhapatnam. The basin exhibits a subdendritic and dendritic pattern of drainage. The Gosthani's is a minor river basin with a total drainage area of less than 2000 km^{2}. Much of the basin is covered by khondalite group of gneissic rocks. About 3% of the total area of the Visakhapatnam district is under the Gosthani basin. The river is rainfed, receiving an average rainfall of 110 cm most of which comes from the south-west monsoon. There are several red sand hills near Bheemunipatnam, where the Gosthani joins the Bay of Bengal, which are reminiscent of the Chambal ravines. These are thought to have been formed six millennia ago due to shifts in the river's course following tectonic activity. The river joins the Bay of Bengal at Bhimli where it forms an estuary.

== Historic places ==
Bheemunipatnam or Bhimli, located at the confluence of the river with the Bay of Bengal was one of the earliest outposts of the Dutch East India Company in India and there are many monuments from that era in the town. Ancient Buddhist settlements at Pavuralakonda, near Bhimli and at Gudiwada have been excavated. The river is thought to have provided the inhabitants with drinking water and the estuary at Bhimli facilitated sea-borne trade.

== Waterworks ==
The Gosthani's waters are diverted for agricultural and industrial purposes and the river is the chief source of drinking water to the cities of Vizianagaram and Visakhapatnam. Several infiltration wells have been sunk on the Gosthani's riverbed to extract water especially during the summer months. The Thatipudi Reservoir Project with a capacity of 3 TMC was built on the Gosthani during 1963-68 and is located in the Gantyada Mandal of the Vizianagaram district. It irrigates 15,378 acres (62.23 km^{2}) of land in Vizianagaram district and provides drinking water to Visakhapatnam. The Chaparai Falls, situated in a verdant valley, is on the Gosthani river. The Visakhapatnam to Srikakulam leg of the Golden Quadrilateral Highway crosses the Gosthani at Tagarapuvalasa where a new bridge was inaugurated in 2003.

== Environmental issues ==
The decision to grant bauxite mining leases in Visakhapatnam by the Government of Andhra Pradesh has drawn criticism from local people, activists and the Central Government who fear severe environmental damage along the source and catchment areas of the river due to the mining. The decision to lease out the Gosthani's river bed to a private company for the extraction of groundwater through the sinking of borewells is thought to have had serious consequences on the water table and water security of over 100,000 people in the region.

== Image Gallery ==
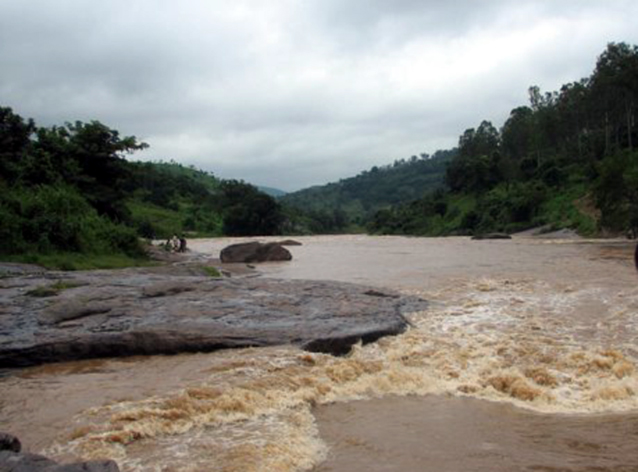
Gosthani River during monsoon near Borra Caves

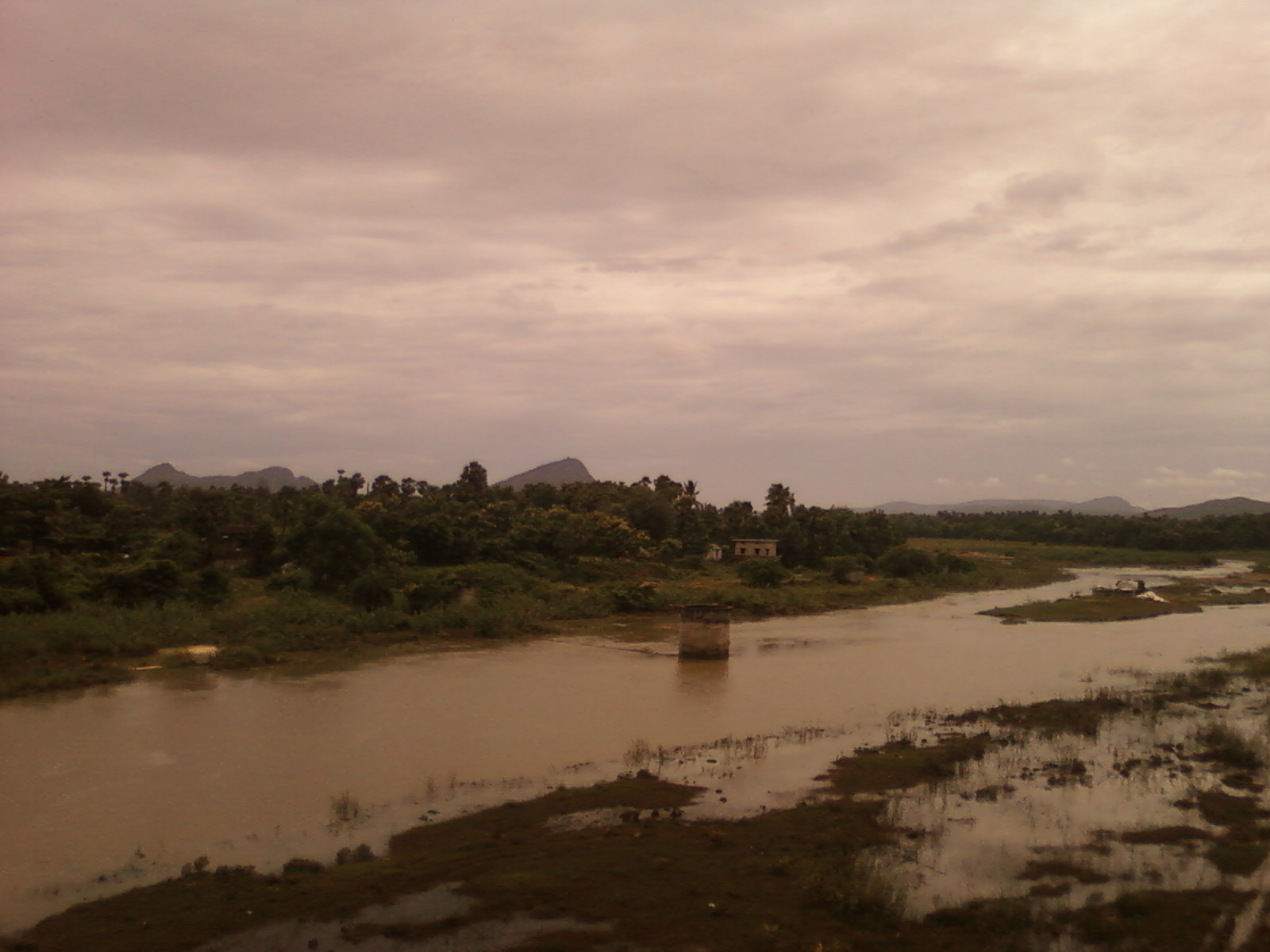
River Gosthani at Bhimasingi

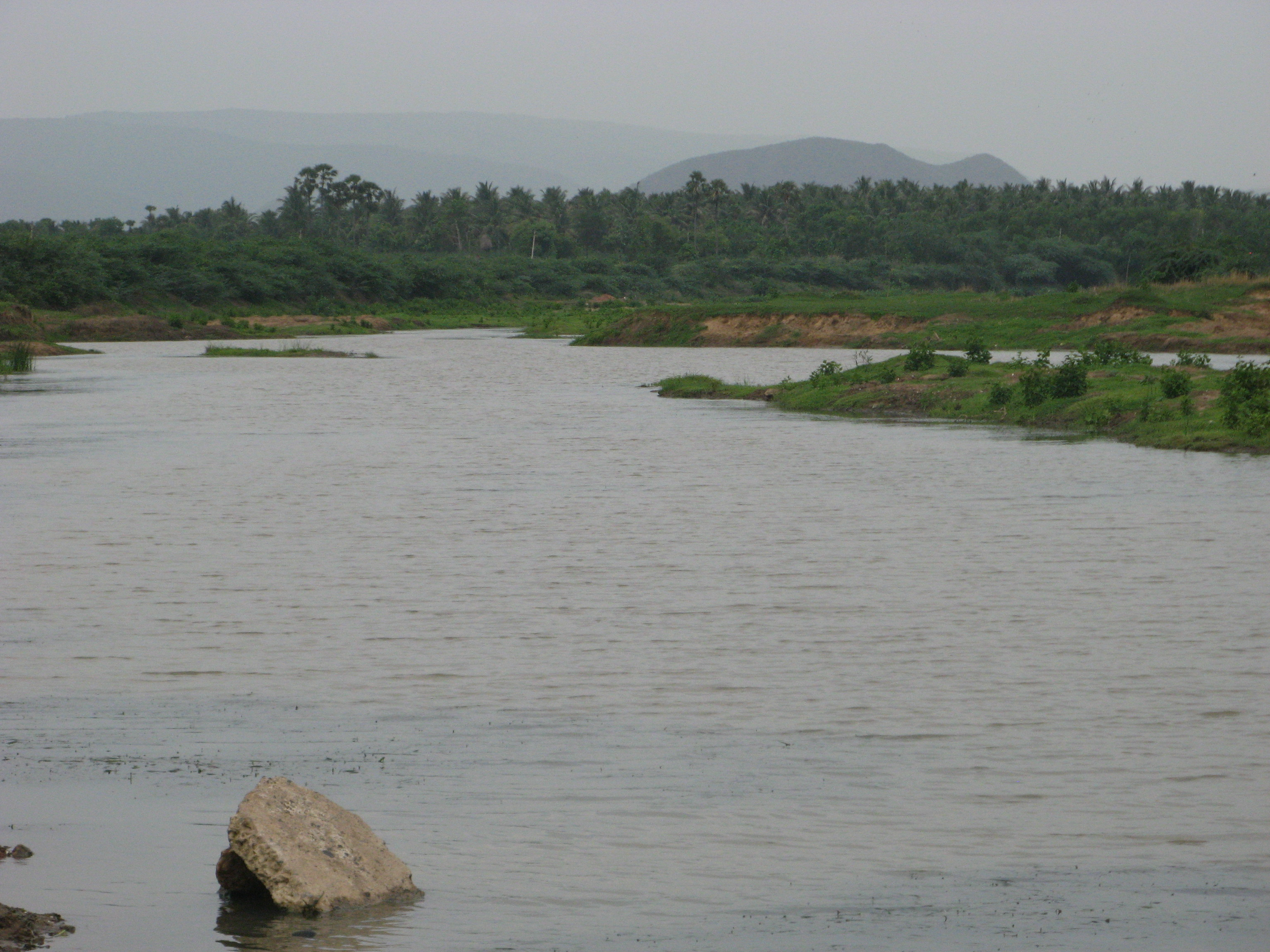
River Gosthani at Thagarapuvalasa

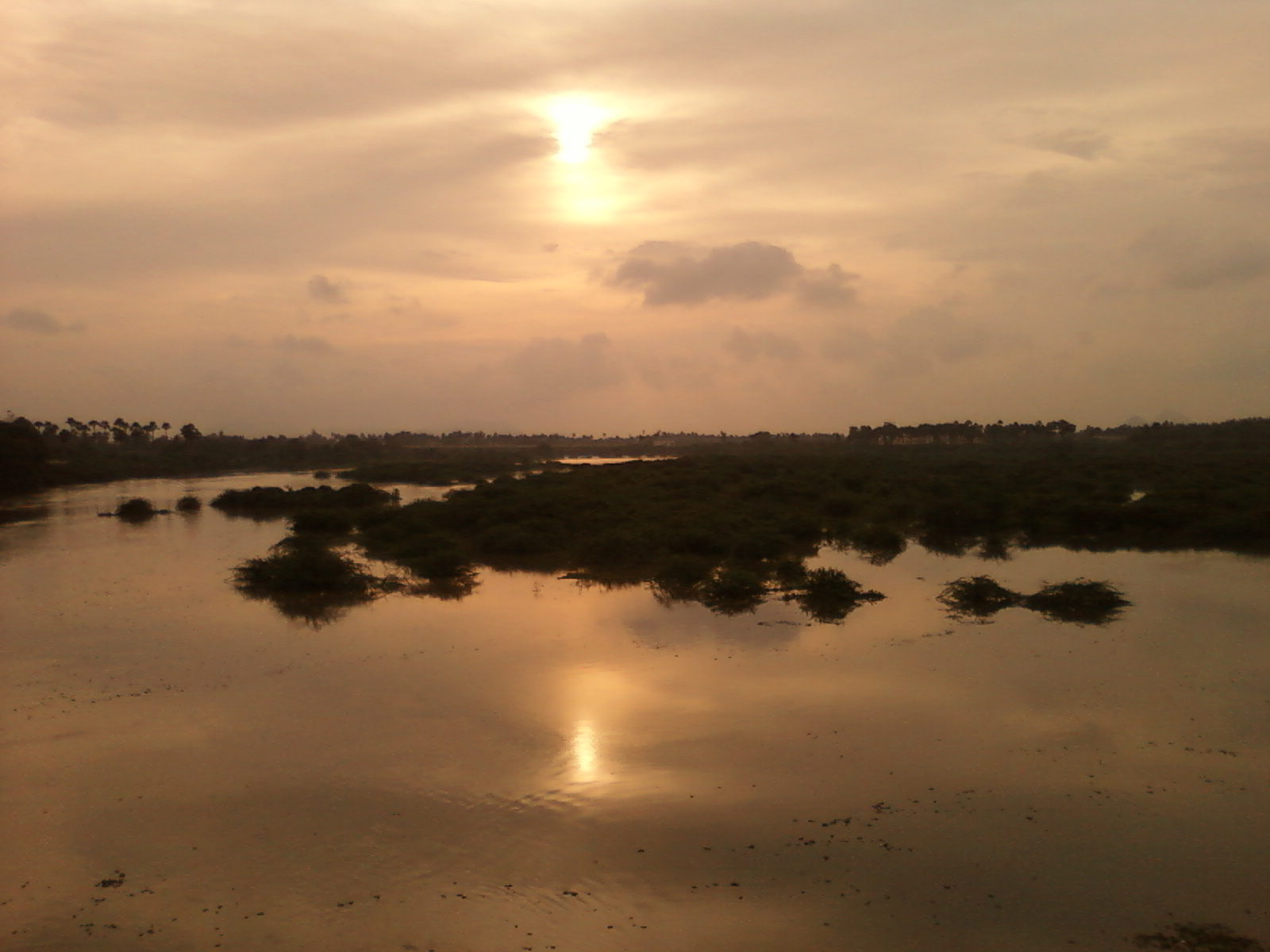
Sunset over River Gosthani at Thagarapuvalasa

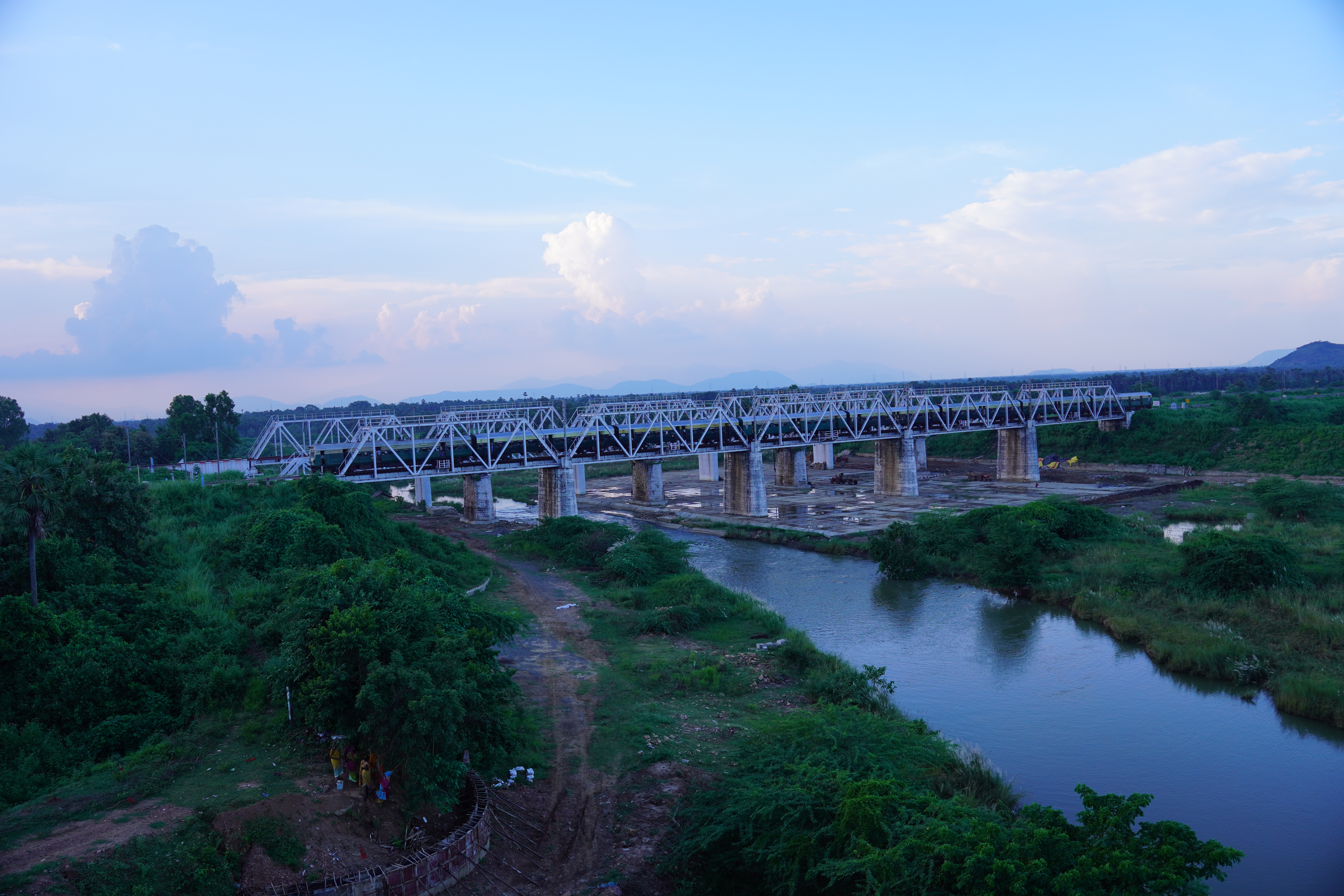
A train passing on a bridge over Gosthani near Bhimasingi

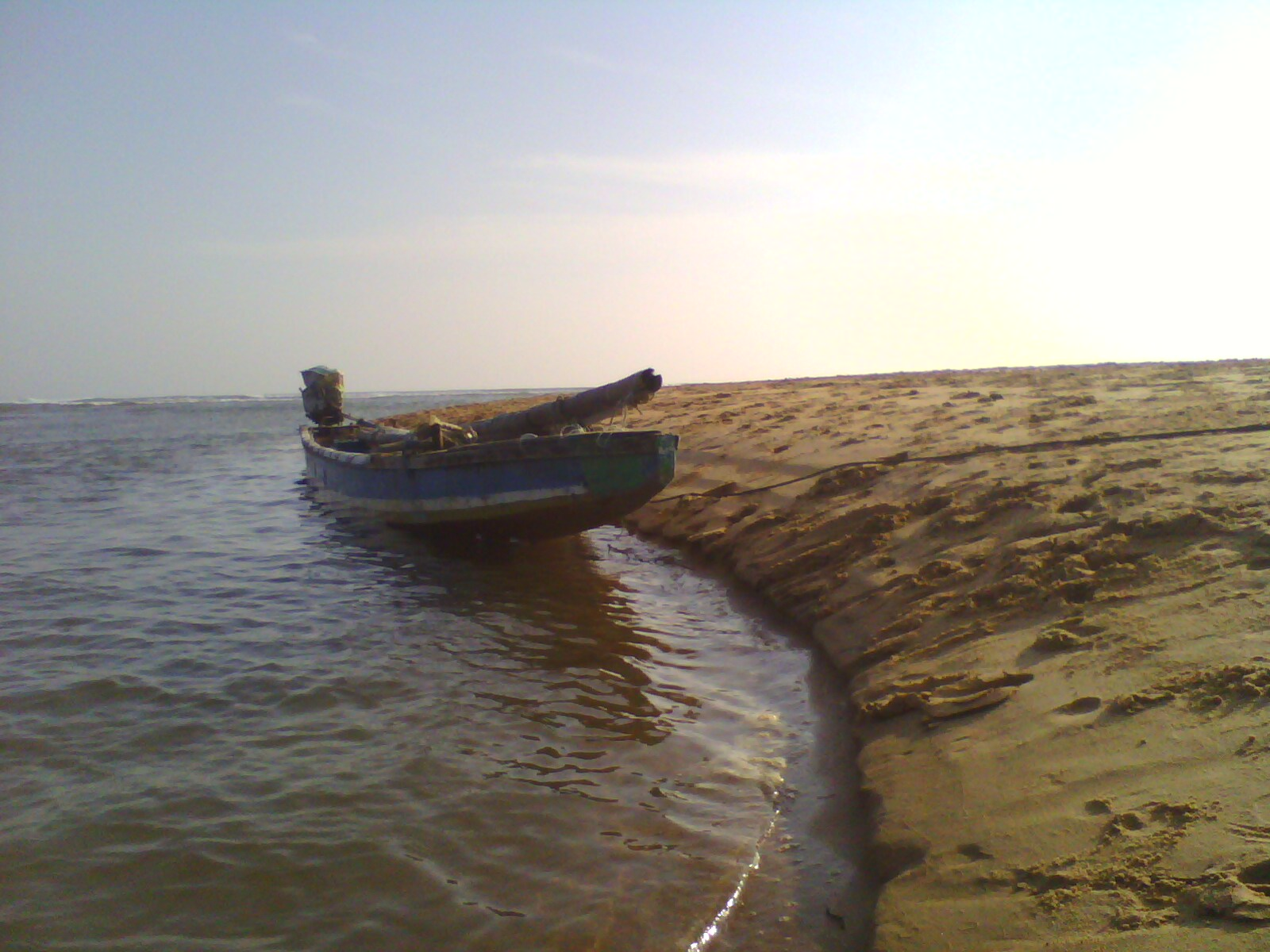
Boat in River Gosthani at Bheemunipatnam beach

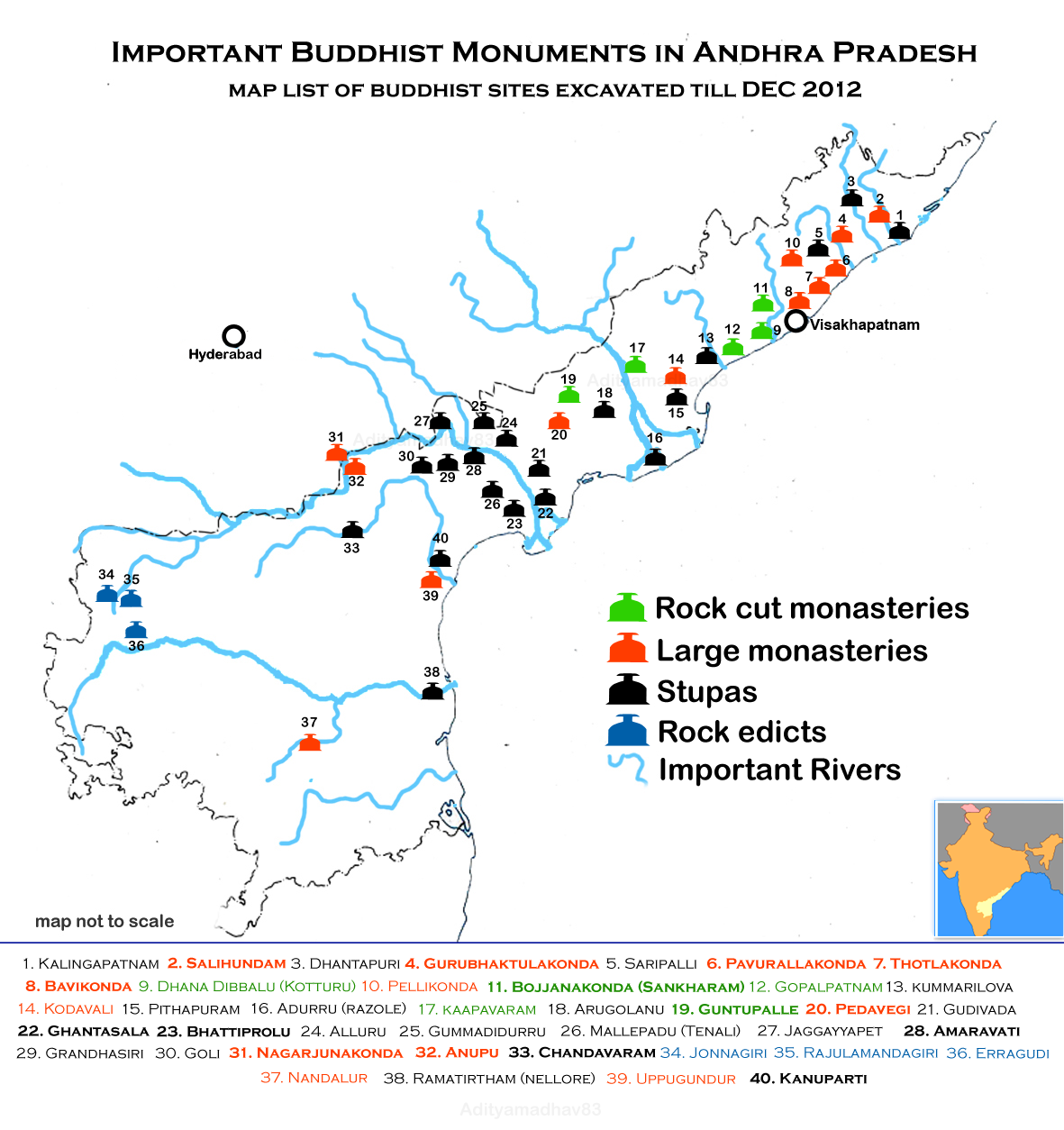
Many Important Buddhist sites lie along the basin of River Gosthani as Pavurallakonda, Gudiwada Dibba, Pellikonda and Boni

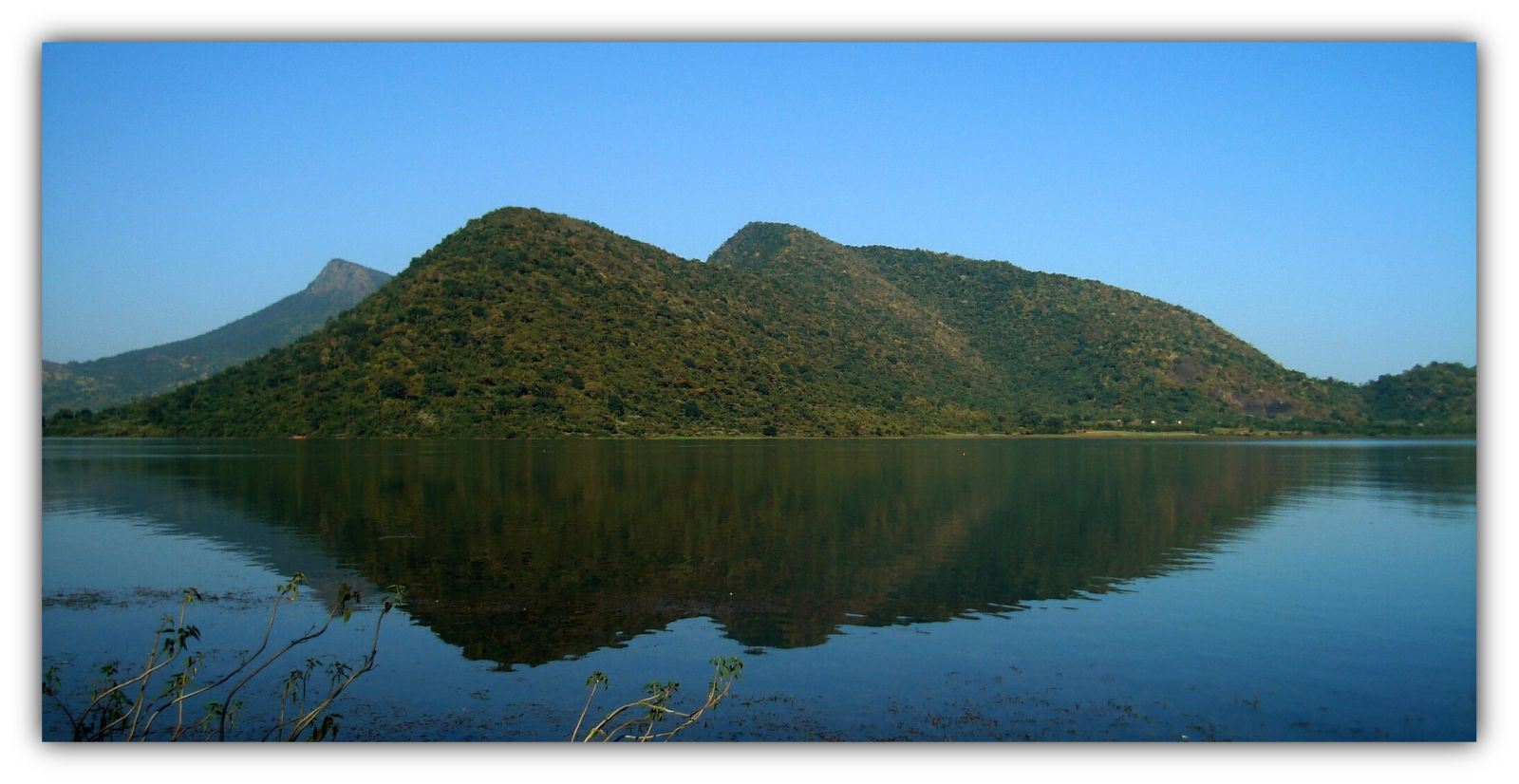
Eastern Ghats view over Gosthani Reservoir at Tatipudi
