= Gannavaram railway station =

Railway station in Andhra Pradesh, India

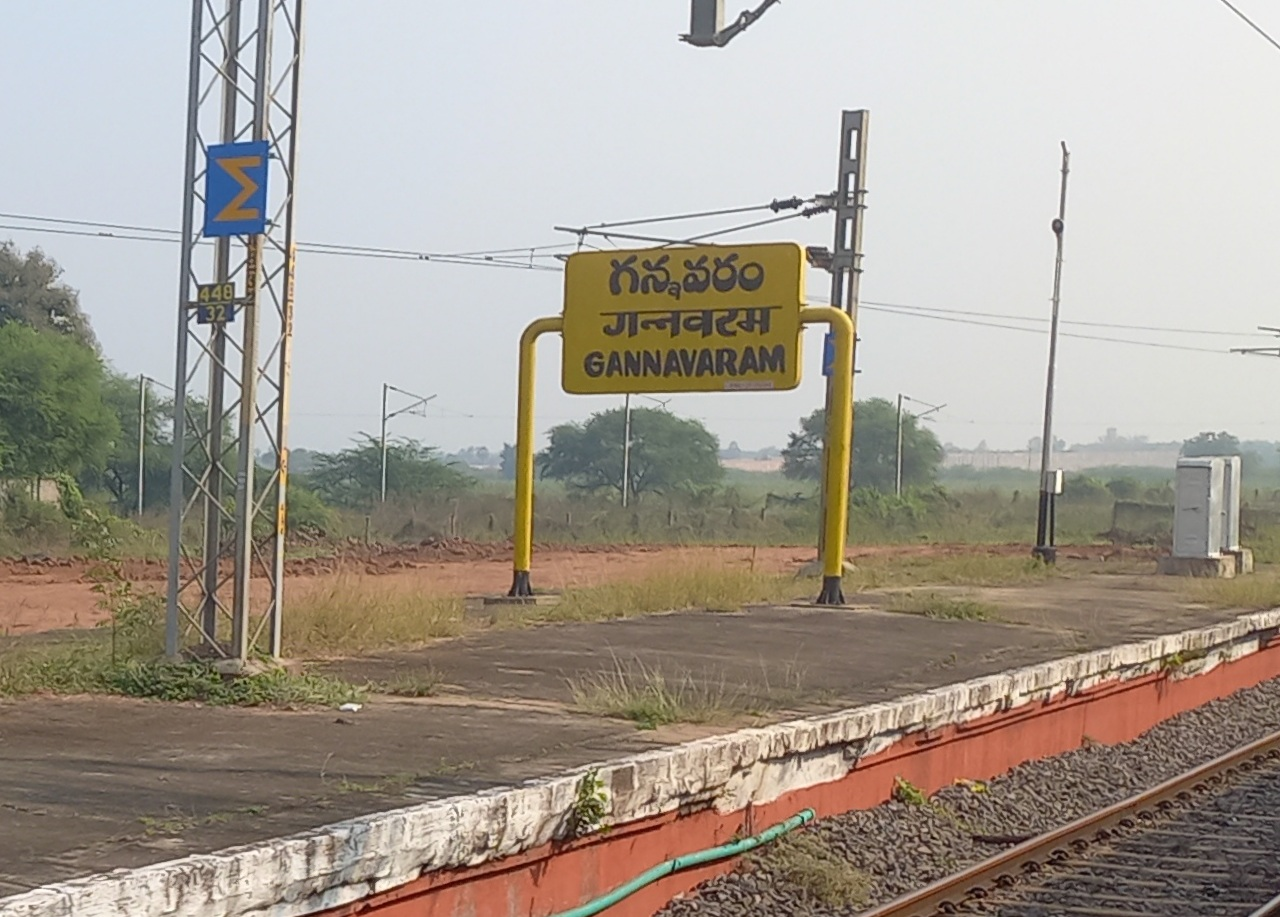

General information
- Location: Gannavaram, Vijayawada, Krishna district, Andhra Pradesh; India
- Coordinates: 16.110°N 80.4943°E
- Operator: Indian Railways
- Line: Duvvada–Vijayawada section
- Platforms: 3

Construction
- Structure type: Standard (On ground)
- Accessible: Disabled access

Other information
- Status: Active
- Station code: GWM
- Zone(s): South Coast Railway zone
- Division(s): Vijayawada

Services
Preceding station	Indian Railways	Following station
Mustabada towards ?	South Coast Railway zone Duvvada–Vijayawada section	Pedda Avutapale towards ?
Location
- Location within India Location within Andhra Pradesh
- Interactive map

Gannavaram railway station (station code:GWM) is an Indian Railways station in Gannavaram, Andhra Pradesh. It lies on the Duvvada–Vijayawada section of Howrah–Chennai main line and is administered under Vijayawada railway division of South Coast Railway zone. It serves one of the satellite stations of Vijayawada railway station. It is one of the 27 rural stations in the state to have Wi-Fi.

== Classification ==
In terms of earnings and outward passengers handled, Gannavaram is categorized as a Non-Suburban Grade-6 (NSG-6) railway station. Based on the re–categorization of Indian Railway stations for the period of 2017–18 and 2022–23, an NSG–6 category station earns nearly ₹1 crore and handles close to 1 million passengers.
