= Gannavaram =

- Village
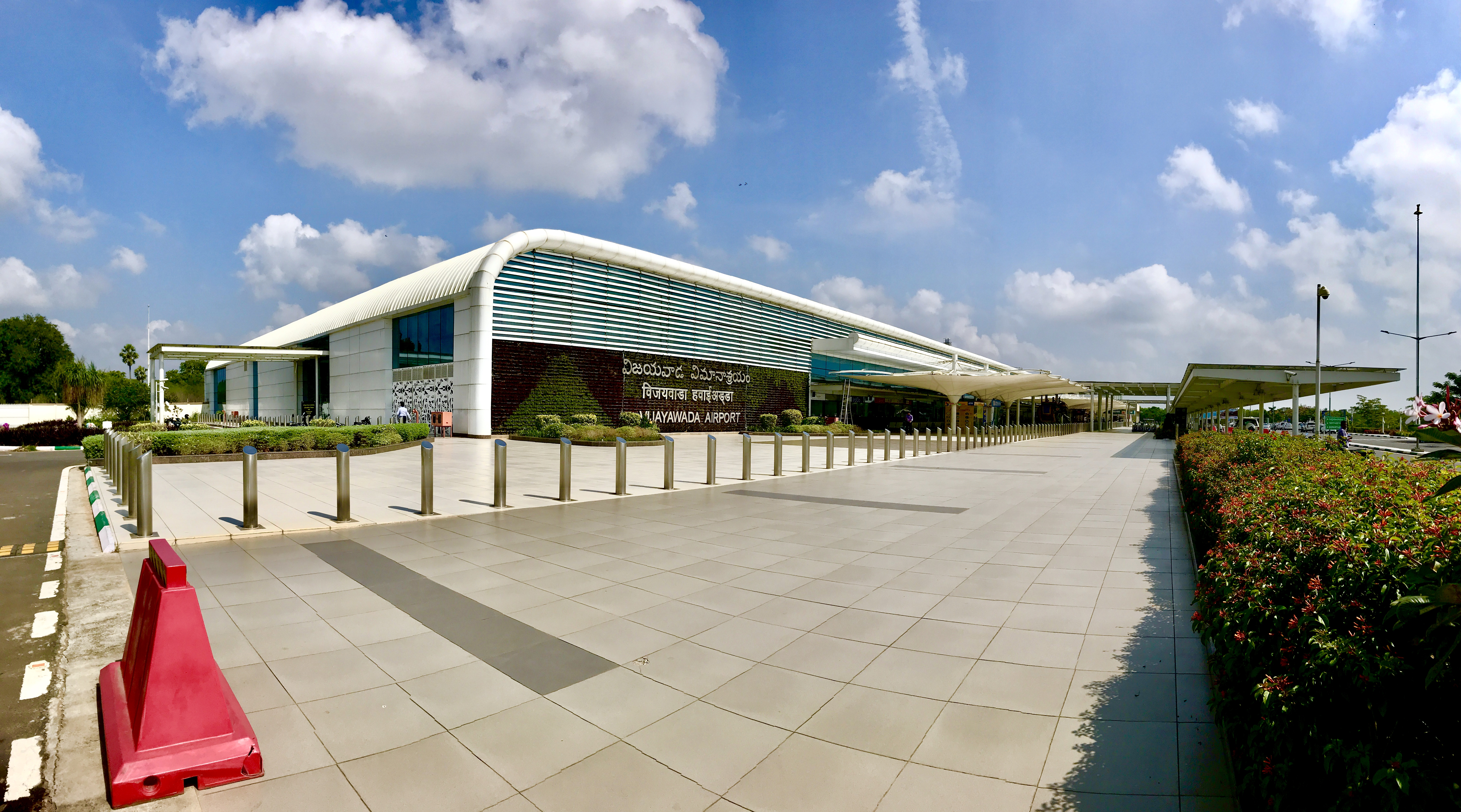
- Vijayawada Airport in Gannavaram

- Location in Andhra Pradesh, India
- Coordinates: 16.5333°N 80.8000°E
- Country: India
- State: Andhra Pradesh
- District: Krishna
- Mandal: Gannavaram
- Town: Gannavaram
- Metro: Andhra Pradesh Capital Region

Area
  - Total: 12.30 km^{2} (4.75 sq mi)

Population (2011)
  - Total: 20,728
  - Density: 1,685/km^{2} (4,365/sq mi)

Languages
  - Official: Telugu
- Time zone: UTC+5:30 (IST)
- PIN: 521101

Gannavaram is a village in Krishna district, Andhra Pradesh, India. It is the mandal headquarters of Gannavaram mandal which is administered under Gudivada revenue division. Vijayawada Airport is located here. Marlapalem is a part of Gannavaram.

== Name origin ==
The name Gannavaram is based on the traditional Sanskrit words "Ganna" meaning Sugarcane and "varam" meaning 'blessing'. Historically Gannavaram used to be a primarily sugarcane-producing establishment. Hence named Gannavaram, 'blessed with sugarcane'.

== Climate ==
Climate data for Gannavaram (1991–2020)
Month	Jan	Feb	Mar	Apr	May	Jun	Jul	Aug	Sep	Oct	Nov	Dec	Year
Record high °C (°F)	35.9 (96.6)	38.2 (100.8)	43.3 (109.9)	44.5 (112.1)	48.8 (119.8)	47.6 (117.7)	41.0 (105.8)	39.8 (103.6)	39.4 (102.9)	38.2 (100.8)	35.8 (96.4)	35.0 (95.0)	48.8 (119.8)
Mean daily maximum °C (°F)	30.4 (86.7)	32.8 (91.0)	35.9 (96.6)	37.9 (100.2)	40.2 (104.4)	37.2 (99.0)	33.9 (93.0)	33.0 (91.4)	33.2 (91.8)	32.4 (90.3)	31.4 (88.5)	30.4 (86.7)	34.0 (93.2)
Mean daily minimum °C (°F)	18.5 (65.3)	20.0 (68.0)	22.7 (72.9)	25.3 (77.5)	27.3 (81.1)	26.7 (80.1)	25.4 (77.7)	25.1 (77.2)	24.9 (76.8)	23.8 (74.8)	21.4 (70.5)	18.9 (66.0)	23.3 (73.9)
Record low °C (°F)	11.1 (52.0)	14.4 (57.9)	17.0 (62.6)	19.4 (66.9)	19.4 (66.9)	20.2 (68.4)	20.2 (68.4)	20.2 (68.4)	18.2 (64.8)	17.6 (63.7)	14.0 (57.2)	13.0 (55.4)	11.1 (52.0)
Average rainfall mm (inches)	5.8 (0.23)	10.4 (0.41)	11.0 (0.43)	17.2 (0.68)	63.0 (2.48)	138.3 (5.44)	207.7 (8.18)	180.5 (7.11)	170.3 (6.70)	150.6 (5.93)	60.5 (2.38)	16.7 (0.66)	1,032 (40.63)
Average rainy days	0.5	0.6	0.5	0.9	2.5	7.4	12.1	10.4	8.7	7.6	2.6	0.6	54.3
Average relative humidity (%) (at 17:30 IST)	58	54	49	48	46	52	66	71	75	77	70	60	60
Source: India Meteorological Department

== Transport ==
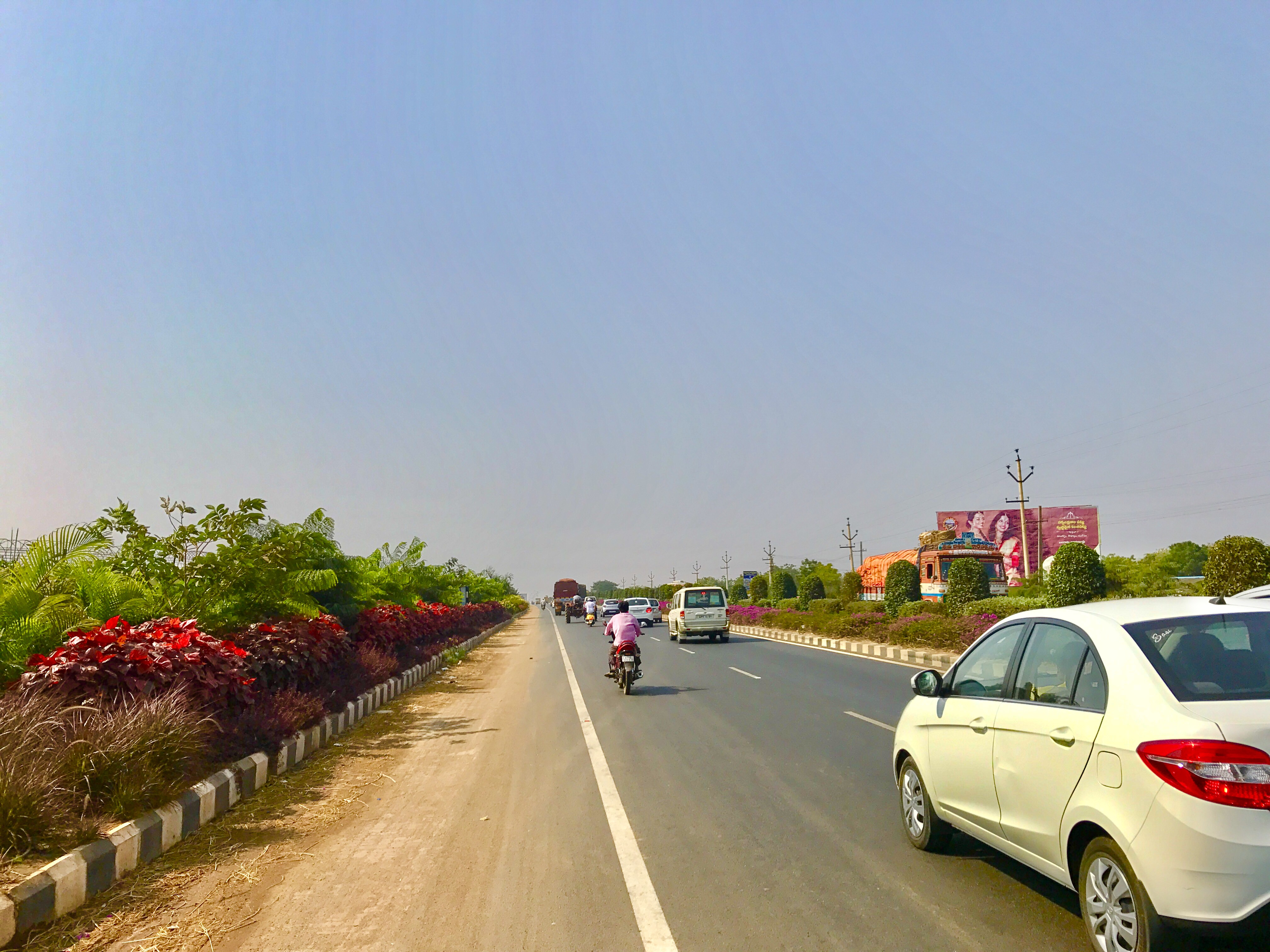
APCRDA-Greenway near Gannavaram

APSRTC operates buses from Gannavaram bus station which also has a bus depot. Gannavaram railway station is one of the satellite railway stations of the Vijayawada. The airport is located at Gannavaram 13 KM from centre of the city. Road connectivity is available from here to various parts of the city.

== Education ==
The primary and secondary school education is imparted by government, aided and private schools, under the School Education Department of the state. The medium of instruction followed by different schools are English and Telugu. Among the high schools in the area include, Little Lights Free Education High School, APSW Residential School, Z.P. High School, and Z.P. High School (girls).
