= Tirupati–Machilipatnam Link Express =

Overview
- Service type: Express
- Locale: Andhra Pradesh
- Current operator: South Coast Railway zone

Route
- Termini: Tirupati (TPTY); Machilipatnam (MTM)
- Stops: 19
- Distance travelled: 467 km (290 mi)
- Average journey time: 9h 50m
- Service frequency: Daily (Note: Runs seven days in a week for every direction.)
- Train number: 17401/17402

On-board services
- Classes: AC 2 tier, AC 3 tier, Sleeper class, General Unreserved
- Seating arrangements: No
- Sleeping arrangements: Yes
- Catering facilities: On-board catering E-catering
- Observation facilities: ICF coach
- Entertainment facilities: No
- Baggage facilities: No
- Other facilities: Below the seats

Technical
- Rolling stock: 2
- Track gauge: 1,676 mm (5 ft 6 in)
- Operating speed: 48 km/h (30 mph), including halts
Route map
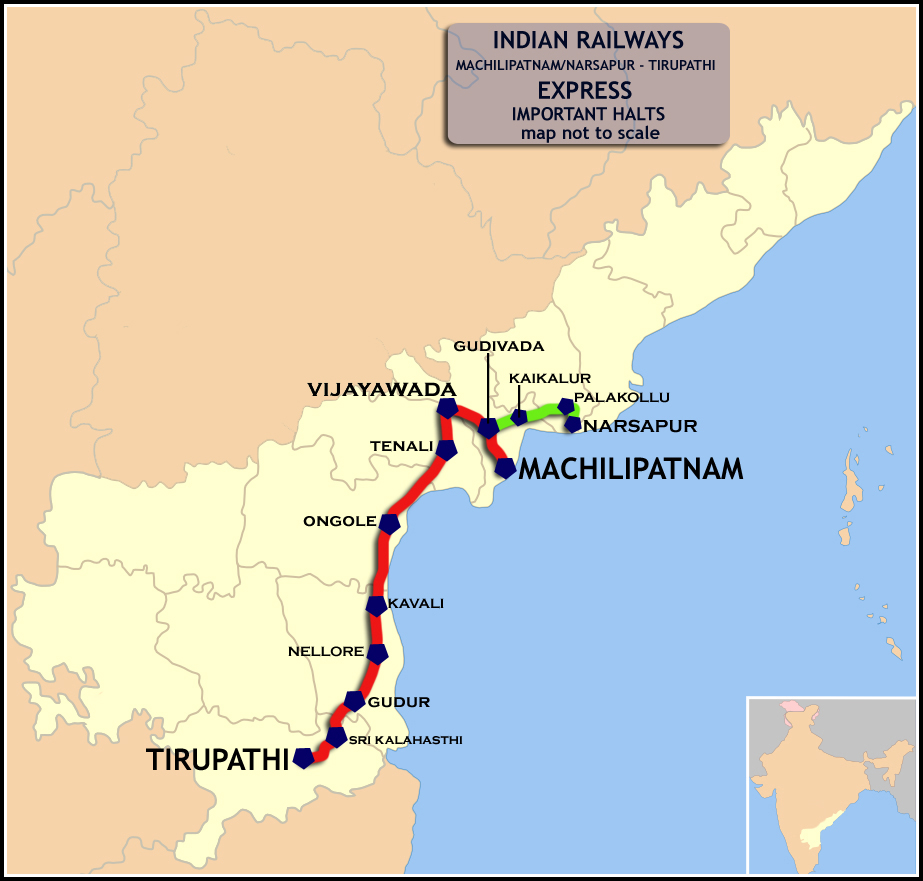

The Tirupati–Machilipatnam Link Express is an Express train belonging to South Central Railway zone that runs between Tirupati and Machilipatnam in India. It is currently being operated with 17401/17402 train numbers on a daily basis.

== Service ==
The 17401/Tirupati–Machilipatnam Link Express has an average speed of 48 km/h and covers 467 km in 9h 50m. The 17402/Machilipatanam-Tirupati Link Express has an average speed of 48 km/h and covers 467 km in 9h 50m.

== Route and halts ==
The important halts of the train are:

- Tirupati
- Renigunta Junction
- Venkatagiri
- Gudur Junction
- Nellore
- Ongole
- Tenali Junction
- Vijayawada Junction
- Gudivada Junction
- Gudivada Junction
- Machilipatnam

== Coach composition ==
The train has standard ICF rakes with a max speed of 110 kmph. The train consists of 19 coaches:

- 2 AC III Tier
- 9 Sleeper coaches
- 4 General Unreserved
- 4 Seating cum Luggage Rake

== Traction ==
Both trains are hauled by a Vijayawada Loco Shed based WAM-4P electric locomotive from Tirupati to Vijayawada. From Vijayawada train is hauled by a Guntakal Loco Shed-based WDM-3A diesel locomotive uptil Machilipatnam and vice versa.

== See also ==
- Tirupati railway station
- Machilipatnam railway station
