= List of countries by metro rail network size =

Countries ranked by total length of metro rail systems

This is a list of countries by metro rail network size, ranked by the total route length of electrified rapid transit systems (metros) in operation. Data are based on various official and industry sources. Countries may be sorted by total length, number of stations, number of systems, and year the first system opened.

== List ==
Rank	Country / Territory	Total length (km)	Number of stations	Number of systems	Year first system opened	City	City Length (km)	City Stations	Ref(s)
1	China	11710.3	6,680	54	1969	Beijing	909.00	541	
1	China	11710.3	6,680	54	1969	Tianjin	370.00	258	
1	China	11710.3	6,680	54	1969	Hong Kong	209.10	99	
1	China	11710.3	6,680	54	1969	Shanghai	816.00	508	
1	China	11710.3	6,680	54	1969	Taipei	138.30	118	
1	China	11710.3	6,680	54	1969	Guangzhou	779.9	309	
1	China	11710.3	6,680	54	1969	Chengdu	721.30	447	
1	China	11710.3	6,680	54	1969	Shenzhen	642.00	432	
1	China	11710.3	6,680	54	1969	Wuhan	553.00	335	
1	China	11710.3	6,680	54	1969	Nanjing	625.73	258	
1	China	11710.3	6,680	54	1969	Hangzhou	516.00	270	
1	China	11710.3	6,680	54	1969	Chongqing	574.12	324	
1	China	11710.3	6,680	54	1969	Xi'an	423.91	284	
1	China	11710.3	6,680	54	1969	Suzhou	346.76	285	
1	China	11710.3	6,680	54	1969	Zhengzhou	449.80	271	
1	China	11710.3	6,680	54	1969	Changsha	228.49	148	
1	China	11710.3	6,680	54	1969	Ningbo	359.05	164	
1	China	11710.3	6,680	54	1969	Qingdao	359.36	176	
1	China	11710.3	6,680	54	1969	Shenyang	216.70	143	
1	China	11710.3	6,680	54	1969	Dalian	237.70	100	
1	China	11710.3	6,680	54	1969	Changchun	159.80	107	
1	China	11710.3	6,680	54	1969	Harbin	91.57	78	
1	China	11710.3	6,680	54	1969	Kunming	165.85	103	
1	China	11710.3	6,680	54	1969	Nanning	127.90	104	
1	China	11710.3	6,680	54	1969	Hefei	232.00	161	
1	China	11710.3	6,680	54	1969	Shijiazhuang	76.50	63	
1	China	11710.3	6,680	54	1969	Guiyang	149.05	82	
1	China	11710.3	6,680	54	1969	Xiamen	98.40	70	
1	China	11710.3	6,680	54	1969	Fuzhou	205.80	102	
1	China	11710.3	6,680	54	1969	Nanchang	160.20	113	
1	China	11710.3	6,680	54	1969	Urumqi	27.60	21	
1	China	11710.3	6,680	54	1969	Jinan	182.40	103	
1	China	11710.3	6,680	54	1969	Changzhou	54.00	43	
1	China	11710.3	6,680	54	1969	Xuzhou	72.50	54	
1	China	11710.3	6,680	54	1969	Taiyuan	52.40	44	
1	China	11710.3	6,680	54	1969	Luoyang	43.60	33	
1	China	11710.3	6,680	54	1969	Shaoxing	65.20	40	
1	China	11710.3	6,680	54	1969	Nantong	60.00	43	
1	China	11710.3	6,680	54	1969	Dongguan	95.26	39	
1	China	11710.3	6,680	54	1969	Foshan	98.50	49	
1	China	11710.3	6,680	54	1969	Lanzhou	43.60	33	
1	China	11710.3	6,680	54	1969	Wuxi	145.00	97	
1	China	11710.3	6,680	54	1969	Wuhu	46.25	35	
1	China	11710.3	6,680	54	1969	Wenzhou	116.40	63	
1	China	11710.3	6,680	54	1969	Taizhou (Zhejiang)	52.40	35	
1	China	11710.3	6,680	54	1969	Jinhua	107.17	30	
1	China	11710.3	6,680	54	1969	Hohhot	49.00	44	
2	United States	1400	1120	14	1870	New York City	399.00	472	
2	United States	1400	1120	14	1870	Washington, D.C.	208.00	98	
2	United States	1400	1120	14	1870	Chicago	165.40	146	
2	United States	1400	1120	14	1870	Boston	61.00	53	
2	United States	1400	1120	14	1870	San Francisco	211.50	50	
2	United States	1400	1120	14	1870	Los Angeles	34.30	19	
2	United States	1400	1120	14	1870	Atlanta	76.60	38	
2	United States	1400	1120	14	1870	Philadelphia	59.10	75	
2	United States	1400	1120	14	1870	Dallas	192.00	73	
2	United States	1400	1120	14	1870	Seattle	101.00	50	
2	United States	1400	1120	14	1870	Miami	39.30	23	
2	United States	1400	1120	14	1870	Baltimore	24.90	14	
2	United States	1400	1120	14	1870	San Juan	17.20	16	
2	United States	1400	1120	14	1870	Honolulu	25.90	13	
2	United States	1400	1120	14	1870	San Juan	17.20	16	
3	India	1181.13	937	23	1984	Delhi	374.47	271	
3	India	1181.13	937	23	1984	Bengaluru	96.10	83	
3	India	1181.13	937	23	1984	Mumbai	90.95	76	
3	India	1181.13	937	23	1984	Visakhapatnam	76.90	54 (planned)	
3	India	1181.13	937	23	1984	Vijayawada	75.00	51 (planned)	
3	India	1181.13	937	23	1984	Kolkata	73.42	58	
3	India	1181.13	937	23	1984	Coimbatore	73.00	32 (planned)	
3	India	1181.13	937	23	1984	Ahmedabad	67.56	54	
3	India	1181.13	937	23	1984	Hyderabad	67.20	57	
3	India	1181.13	937	23	1984	Chennai	54.10	41	
3	India	1181.13	937	23	1984	Thiruvananthapuram	42.1	38 (planned)	
3	India	1181.13	937	23	1984	Surat	40.35	38	
3	India	1181.13	937	23	1984	Nagpur	38.20	37	
3	India	1181.13	937	23	1984	Pune	32.97	29	
3	India	1181.13	937	23	1984	Agra	30.00	27	
3	India	1181.13	937	23	1984	Bhubaneswar & Cuttack	30.00	20 (under const)	
3	India	1181.13	937	23	1984	Noida	29.70	21	
3	India	1181.13	937	23	1984	Thane	29.00	22	
3	India	1181.13	937	23	1984	Kochi	28.00	25	
3	India	1181.13	937	23	1984	Meerut	23.60	12	
3	India	1181.13	937	23	1984	Navi Mumbai	23.40	11	
3	India	1181.13	937	23	1984	Lucknow	22.87	21	
3	India	1181.13	937	23	1984	Prayagraj	20.00	39 (planned)	
3	India	1181.13	937	23	1984	Varanasi	19.35	26 (planned)	
3	India	1181.13	937	23	1984	Kanpur	16.00	14	
3	India	1181.13	937	23	1984	Gurugram	12.85	11	
3	India	1181.13	937	23	1984	Jaipur	11.97	11	
3	India	1181.13	937	23	1984	Bhopal	6.22	8	
3	India	1181.13	937	23	1984	Patna	6.20	5	
3	India	1181.13	937	23	1984	Indore	6.00	5	
4	Japan	897	—	—	1933	Tokyo	—	—	
4	Japan	897	—	—	1933	Osaka	—	—	
4	Japan	897	—	—	1933	Nagoya	—	—	
4	Japan	897	—	—	1933	Sapporo	—	—	
4	Japan	897	—	—	1933	Fukuoka	—	—	
4	Japan	897	—	—	1933	Yokohama	—	—	
4	Japan	897	—	—	1933	Kyoto	—	—	
4	Japan	897	—	—	1933	Kobe	—	—	
4	Japan	897	—	—	1933	Sendai	—	—	
4	Japan	897	—	—	1933	Hiroshima	—	—	
5	South Korea	800	—	—	1974	Seoul	—	—	
5	South Korea	800	—	—	1974	Busan	—	—	
5	South Korea	800	—	—	1974	Daegu	—	—	
5	South Korea	800	—	—	1974	Gwangju	—	—	
5	South Korea	800	—	—	1974	Daejeon	—	—	
5	South Korea	800	—	—	1974	Incheon	—	—	
6	Russia	550	302	7	1935	Moscow	—	—	
6	Russia	550	302	7	1935	Saint Petersburg	—	—	
6	Russia	550	302	7	1935	Nizhny Novgorod	—	—	
6	Russia	550	302	7	1935	Novosibirsk	—	—	
6	Russia	550	302	7	1935	Kazan	—	—	
6	Russia	550	302	7	1935	Yekaterinburg	—	—	
6	Russia	550	302	7	1935	Samara	—	—	
7	Germany	387	—	5	1902	Berlin	—	—	
7	Germany	387	—	5	1902	Hamburg	—	—	
7	Germany	387	—	5	1902	Munich	—	—	
7	Germany	387	—	5	1902	Nuremberg	—	—	
7	Germany	387	—	5	1902	Frankfurt	—	—	
8	France	380	—	—	1900	Paris	—	—	
8	France	380	—	—	1900	Lyon	—	—	
8	France	380	—	—	1900	Marseille	—	—	
8	France	380	—	—	1900	Lille	—	—	
8	France	380	—	—	1900	Toulouse	—	—	
8	France	380	—	—	1900	Rennes	—	—	
9	Brazil	374	—	—	1974	São Paulo	—	—	
9	Brazil	374	—	—	1974	Rio de Janeiro	—	—	
9	Brazil	374	—	—	1974	Brasília	—	—	
9	Brazil	374	—	—	1974	Belo Horizonte	—	—	
9	Brazil	374	—	—	1974	Salvador	—	—	
9	Brazil	374	—	—	1974	Recife	—	—	
9	Brazil	374	—	—	1974	Fortaleza	—	—	
10	Iran	339	—	—	1999	Tehran	—	—	
10	Iran	339	—	—	1999	Mashhad	—	—	
10	Iran	339	—	—	1999	Shiraz	—	—	
10	Iran	339	—	—	1999	Isfahan	—	—	
10	Iran	339	—	—	1999	Tabriz	—	—	
10	Iran	339	—	—	1999	Karaj	—	—	
11	Mexico	288	—	—	1969	Mexico City	—	—	
11	Mexico	288	—	—	1969	Guadalajara	—	—	
11	Mexico	288	—	—	1969	Monterrey	—	—	
12	Singapore	230	—	1	1987	Singapore	—	—	

== See also ==
- List of metro systems
- List of countries by road network size
- List of urban rail systems by length
- Rapid transit
