= Tarigoppula Halt railway station =

Railway station in Andhra Pradesh

Tarigoppula Halt

General information
- Location: Tarigoppula, Andhra Pradesh; India
- Coordinates: 16.4794°N 80.8174°E
- Elevation: 21 metres (69 ft)
- System: Indian Railways station
- Owner: Indian Railways
- Line: Vijayawada–Gudivada line

Other information
- Status: Operational
- Station code: TGU
- Zone(s): South Coast Railway zone
- Division(s): Vijayawada

Services
Preceding station	Indian Railways	Following station
Tenneru towards ?	Vijayawada–Nidadavolu loop line	Indupalli towards ?
Location
- Location within Andhra Pradesh Location within India
- Interactive map

Tarigoppula Halt railway station (station code:TGU) is an Indian Railways station in the village of Tarigoppula of Krishna district in Andhra Pradesh. It lies on the Gudivada–Machilipatnam branch line, Vijayawada–Nidadavolu loop line and is administered under Vijayawada railway division of South Coast Railway zone.

== Amenities ==
It is one of the 65 standalone stations quipped with the unreserved ticketing system (UTS) in the division.
