= Kavutaram railway station =

Railway station in Andhra Pradesh, India

Kavutaram

General information
- Location: Kavutaram, Andhra Pradesh; India
- Coordinates: 16.3393534°N 81.0454952°E
- Elevation: 21 metres (69 ft)
- System: Indian Railways station
- Owner: Indian Railways
- Line: Vijayawada–Gudivada line

Other information
- Status: Operational
- Station code: KVM
- Zone(s): South Coast Railway
- Division(s): Vijayawada

Services
| Preceding station | Indian Railways | Following station |
|---|---|---|
| Gudlavalleru towards ? | Gudivada–Machilipatnam branch line | Vadlamannadu towards ? |
Location
- Interactive map

Kavutaram railway station (station code:KVM), is a minor station located in Kavutaram, near Gudlavalleru. This railway station is administered under Vijayawada railway division of South Coast Railway Zone.

== Classification ==
In terms of earnings and outward passengers handled, Kavutaram is categorized as a Non-Suburban Grade-6 (NSG-6) railway station. Based on the re–categorization of Indian Railway stations for the period of 2017–18 and 2022–23, an NSG–6 category station earns nearly ₹1 crore and handles close to 1 million passengers.
