= Dosapadu Halt railway station =

Railway station in Andhra Pradesh, India

Dosapadu Halt
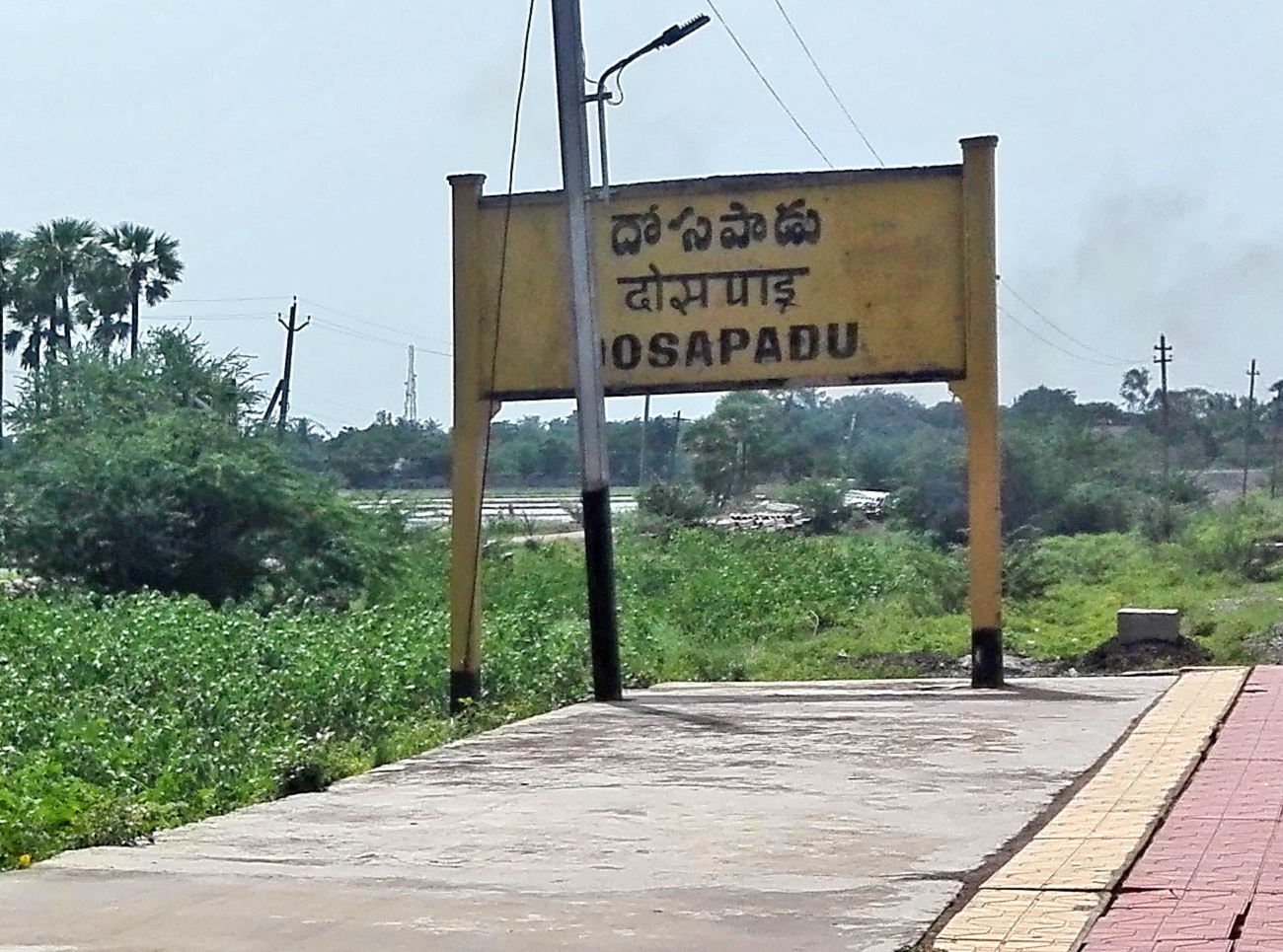

General information
- Location: Dosapadu, Andhra Pradesh; India
- Coordinates: 16.4688°N 80.9369°E
- Elevation: 21 metres (69 ft)
- System: Indian Railways station
- Owner: Indian Railways
- Line: Vijayawada–Gudivada line

Other information
- Status: Operational
- Station code: DPD
- Zone(s): South Coast Railway zone
- Division(s): Vijayawada

Services
Preceding station	Indian Railways	Following station
Ventrapragada towards ?	Vijayawada–Nidadavolu loop line	Gudivada Junction towards ?
Location

Dosapadu Halt railway station is a railway station located near the Dosapadu stream. It serves the villages of Pamulapadu and Dosapadu. It lies on the Vijayawada–Nidadavolu loop line and is administered under Vijayawada railway division of South Coast Railway Zone
