= VPG =

VPG may refer to:

- VPg, a viral protein
- Vaginal photoplethysmography, a measurement of vaginal vasocongestion
- Value-Added Producer Grants, program authorized by the Agriculture Risk Protection Act of 2000c. 6401)
- Vehicle Production Group, an American automobile manufacturer

== Places ==
- Vacchi Piedmont Glacier, glacier in Victoria Land, Antarctica
- Ventrapragada railway station, a railway station in India
- Victoria Peak Garden, a Chinese style garden near the summit of Victoria Peak in Hong Kong
- Victory Playground, Hyderabad, a playground in India
- IATA airport code for Vipingo Ridge Airstrip in eastern Kenya

== People ==
- V. P. Ganesan, a Sri Lankan trade unionist, politician, film producer and actor
- V. P. Gangadharan (born 1954), Indian oncologist
- Vasyl Panasovych Gogol-Yanovsky (1777–1825), Ukrainian playwright
- Ved Prakash Goyal (1926–2008), Indian politician
- Veigar Páll Gunnarsson (born 1980), Icelandic football striker
