= Transport in Vijayawada =

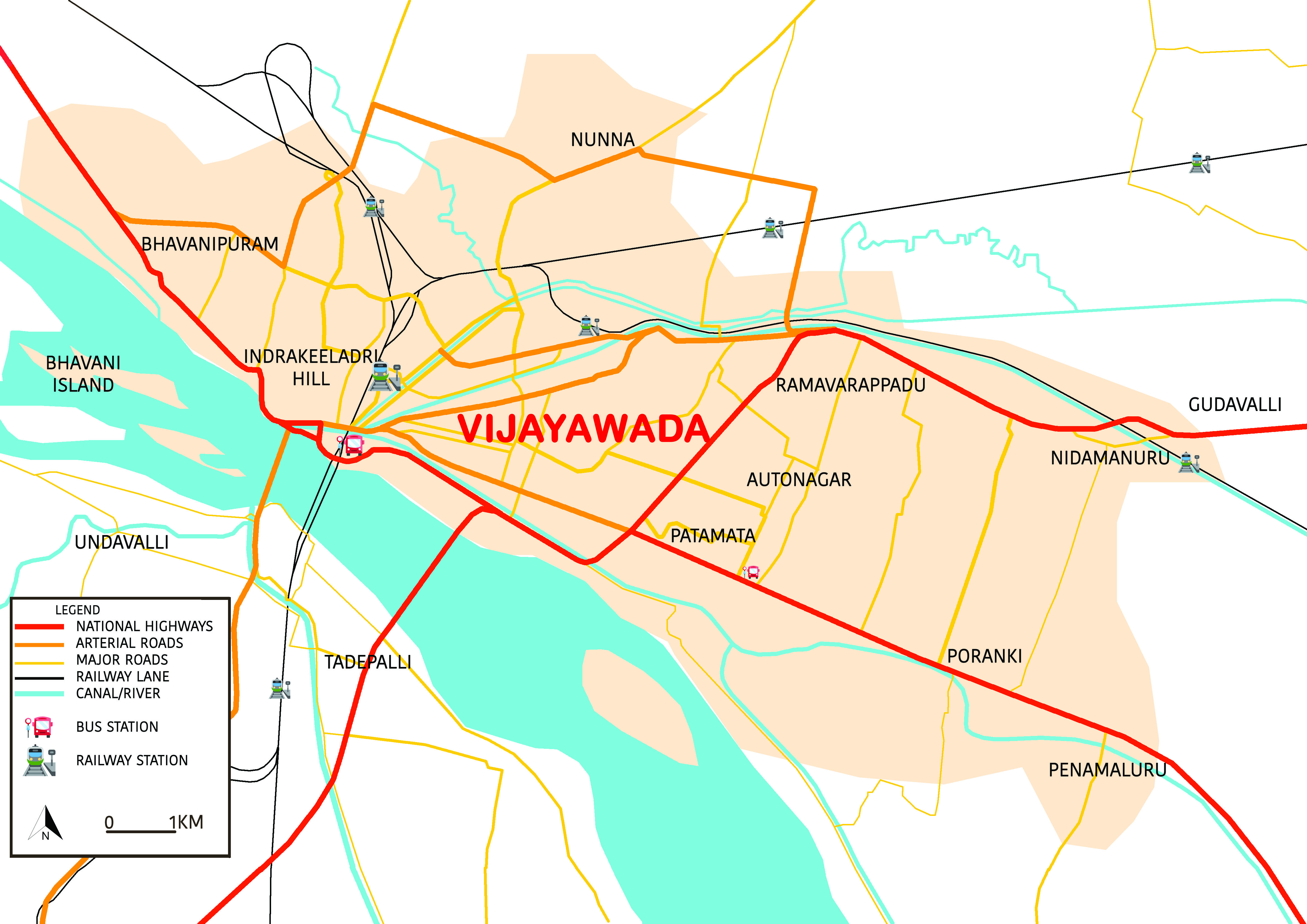
Public Transport map of Vijayawada

Transport in Vijayawada is the network of roads, railways, rapid transit system in the second largest city of Andhra Pradesh. The city of Vijayawada also serves as the central hub of transport and logistics within the state.

There are various modes of transportation available in Vijayawada. It includes auto rickshaws, bicycles to mass transit systems such as buses and trains.

== Roadways ==
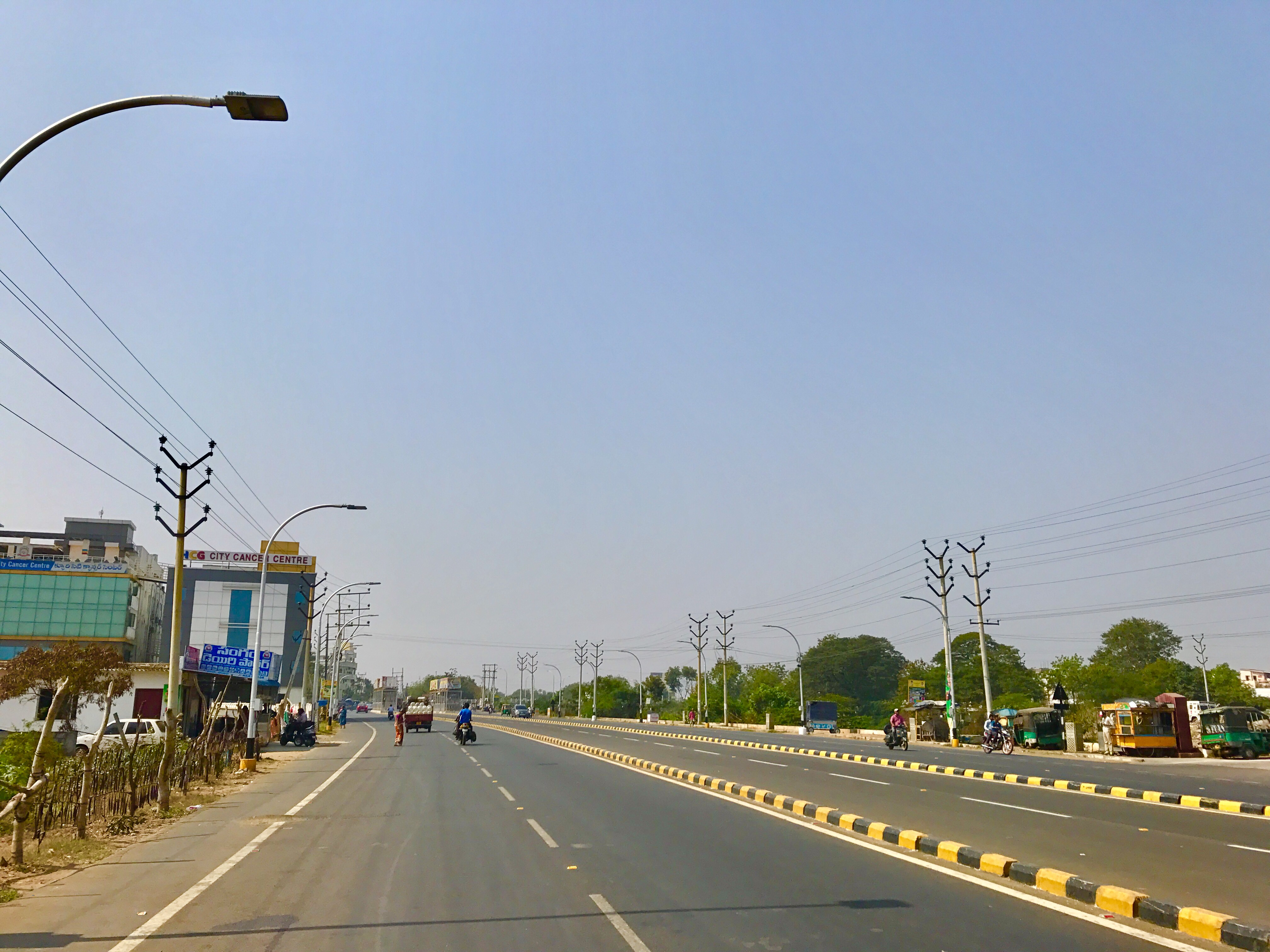
Bus Rapid Transit System road in Vijayawada

The city has a total road length of 1,264.24 km (785.56 mi), covering 1,230.00 km (764.29 mi) of municipal roads, 22.74 km (14.13 mi) of R&B (Roads & Buildings) department roads, 11.50 km (7.15 mi) of National Highways. M.G. Road and Eluru road are the main arterial roads of the city. Benz Circle is one of the busiest road junctions in the city with an average of 57,000 vehicles crossing daily, The junction has the intersection of two national highways of NH 16 and NH 65.

== Public transport ==
Bus Transit is the major mode of passenger transport in the city. PNBS is the major bus station in the city. Vijayawada Bus Rapid Transit System was partially operational. APS RTC operates buses to major parts of the country and also operates Intercity transport (City Bus Services). Apart from PNBS, Autonagar bus station, K.R Market bus stand, Gannavaram bus stand, Governorpet bus stand, Kankipadu bus stand, Mangalgiri bus stand are services as city bus stands & Ibrahimpatnam bus station.

There are close to 8,500 auto rickshaws operating in the city, and the number may be as high as 13,000 by including suburbs. To decrease the environmental impact, eco-friendly E-rickshaws were introduced in the city. The civic authority came up with an idea of women driven autos named as, She Autos.

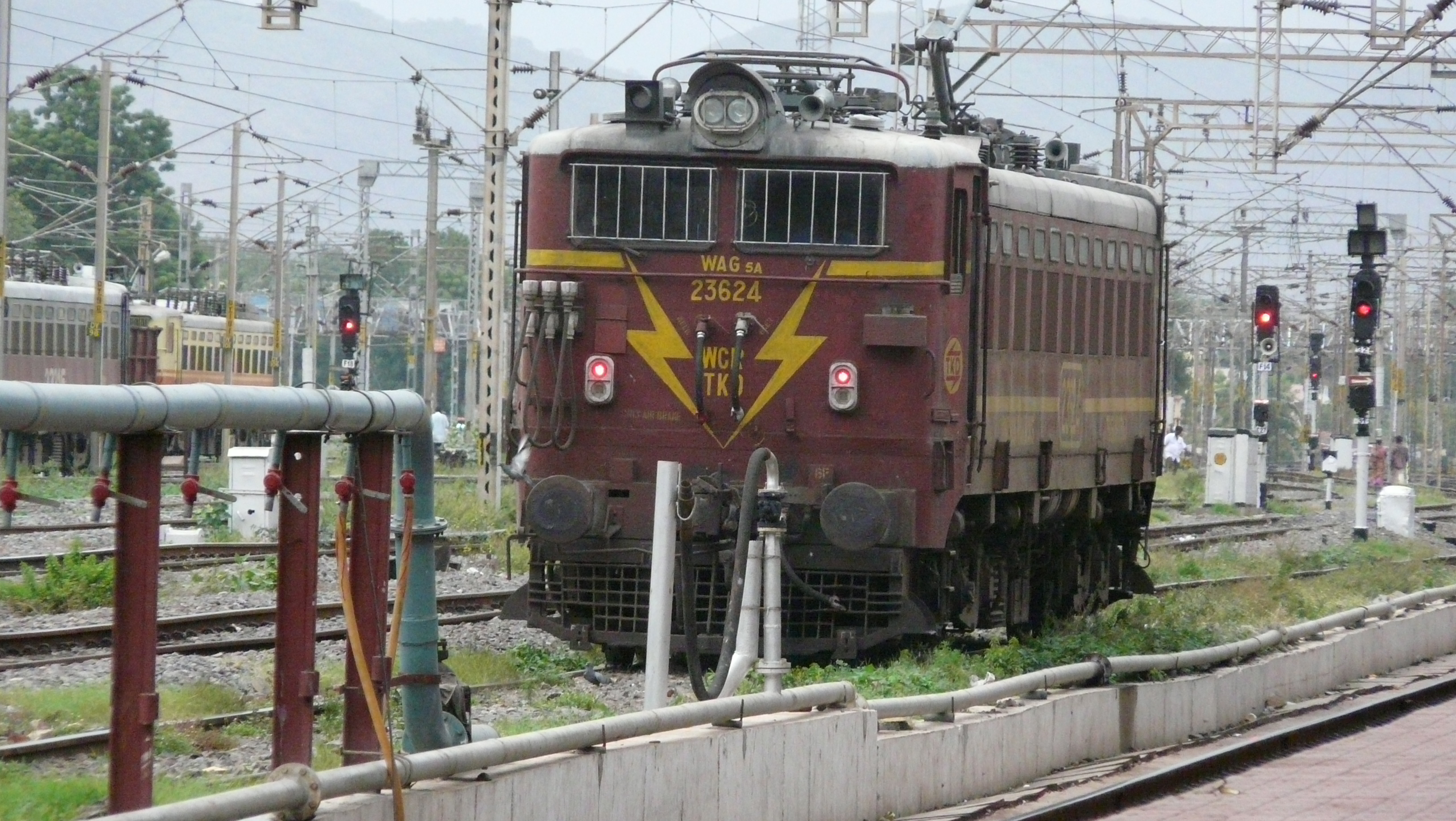
Indian Railways WAG locomotive at Vijayawada railway station

Train Transit is the major mode of transportation in the city, as the city is a major transportation hub in India. The city of Vijayawada has several satellite stations such as, Gannavaram, Gunadala, Krishna Canal, Ramavarappadu, Kondapalli, Rayanapadu, Madhura Nagar, Nidamanuru

=== Suburban and high speed rail ===
A proposed circular train connectivity would connect Vijayawada with neighbouring cities of Guntur, Tenali, Mangalagiri and the state capital, Amaravati.

== Airways ==
Vijayawada Airport is located at Gannavaram, suburb of Vijayawada located at a distance of 20 km from the heart of the city. It had been given international status.

Annual passenger traffic and aircraft movements at Vijayawada Airport
Year	Passenger traffic		Aircraft movement	
Year	Passengers	Percent change	Aircraft movements	Percent change
2017–18	746,392	+19.9%	11,999	+16.1%
2016–17	622,354	+56.1%	10,333	+54.8%
2015–16	398,643	+71.9%	6,676	+43.9%
2014–15	231,931	NA	4,639	NA
