= Kondaveedu Express =

Train in India

Overview
- Service type: Express
- First service: 1 December 2008; 17 years ago
- Current operator: South Central Railway

Route
- Termini: Machilipatnam (MTM); Yesvantpur (YPR)
- Stops: 16
- Distance travelled: 778 km (483 mi)
- Average journey time: 17 hours 45 mins
- Service frequency: Tri-weekly
- Train number: 17211 / 17212

On-board services
- Classes: AC First Class, AC 2 Tier, AC 3 Tier, Sleeper Class, General Unreserved
- Seating arrangements: Yes
- Sleeping arrangements: Yes
- Catering facilities: On-board catering, E-catering
- Observation facilities: Large windows
- Baggage facilities: No
- Other facilities: Below the seats

Technical
- Rolling stock: LHB coach
- Track gauge: Broad Gauge
- Operating speed: 47 km/h (29 mph) average including halts.
Route map
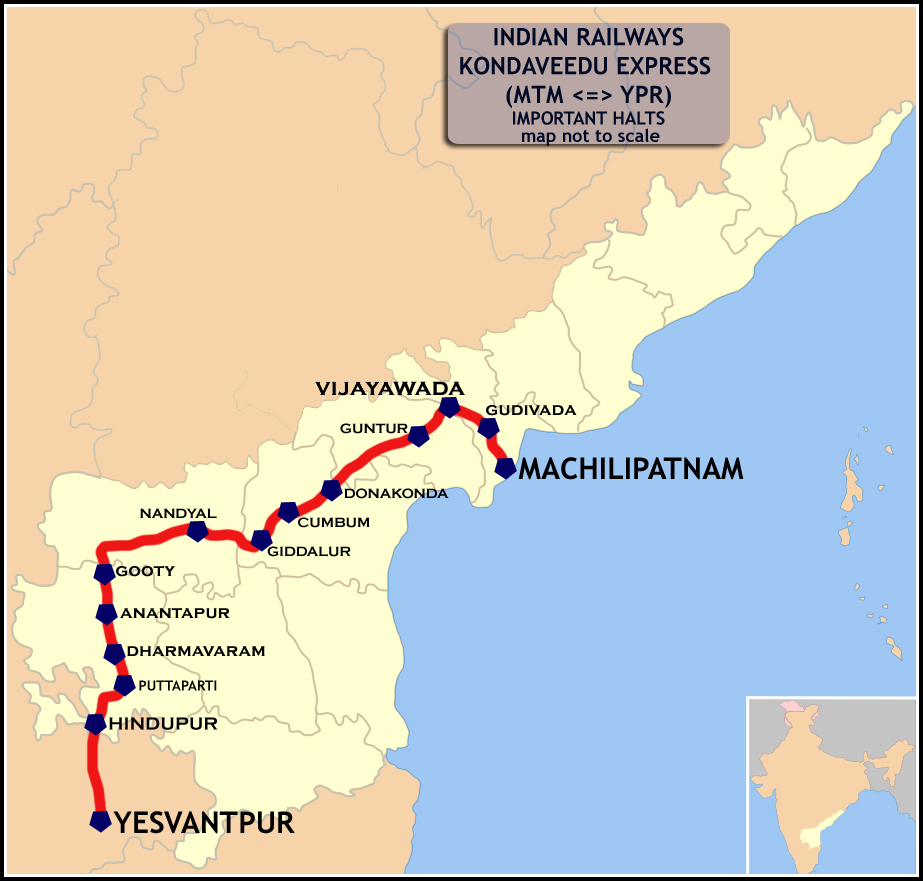

The 17211 / 17212 Kondaveedu Express train belonging to Indian Railways – South Coast Railway zone is a tri-weekly train that runs between Machilipatnam and Yesvantpur Junction in India. The train is named after the Kondaveedu Fort near Guntur City.

It operates as train number 17211 from Machilipatnam to Yesvantpur Junction and as train number 17212 in the reverse direction, serving the state of Andhra Pradesh and Karnataka.

== Coaches ==
This train has 18 coaches viz., one 1st AC, 1 AC II tier, three AC III tier, eight sleeper class, two general second class and one second class luggage cum brake van coaches with accommodation for disabled persons.

As is customary with most train services in India, coach composition may be amended at the discretion of Indian Railways depending on demand.

== Service ==
The 17211 Machilipatnam–Yesvantpur Junction Kondaveedu Express covers the distance of 778 km (483 mi) in 18 hours and in 17 hours 45 mins as 11205 Yesvantpur Junction–Machilipatnam Kondaveedu Express.

As the average speed of the train is below 55 km/h (34 mph), as per Indian Railways rules, its fare does not include a Superfast surcharge.

== Traction ==
earlier was WDP-4D. The train is hauled by a Lallaguda Loco Shed or Vijayawada Loco Shed-based WAP-7 locomotive from end to end.

== Routing ==
The 17211 / 12 Kondaveedu Express runs from Machilipatnam via Gudivada Junction, Vijayawada Junction, Guntur Junction, Nandyal, Gooty Junction, Dharmavaram Junction to Yesvantpur Junction.
