= Vadlamannadu Halt railway station =

Railway station in Andhra Pradesh, India

Vadlamannadu Halt
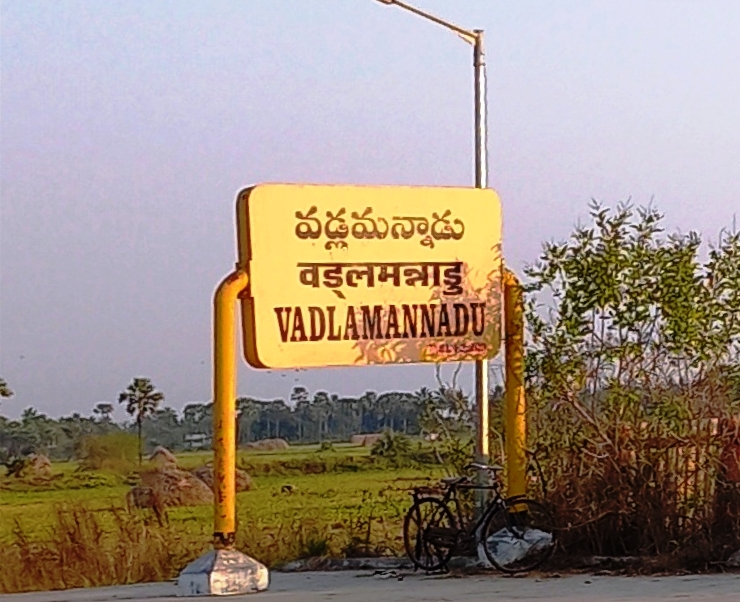

General information
- Location: Vadlamannadu, Andhra Pradesh; India
- Coordinates: 16.3002022°N 81.0973124°E
- Elevation: 6 metres (20 ft)
- System: Indian Railways station
- Owner: Indian Railways
- Line: Gudivada–Machilipatnam branch line

Other information
- Status: Operational
- Station code: VMD
- Zone(s): South Coast Railway
- Division(s): Vijayawada

Services
Preceding station	Indian Railways	Following station
Kavutaram towards ?	Gudivada–Machilipatnam branch line	Pedana towards ?
Location
- Interactive map

Vadlamannadu Halt railway station (station code:VMD), is railway station in Vadlamannadu of Krishna district. This railway station is administered under Vijayawada railway division of South Coast Railway Zone.
