= Uppaluru railway station =

Railway station in Andhra Pradesh

Uppaluru
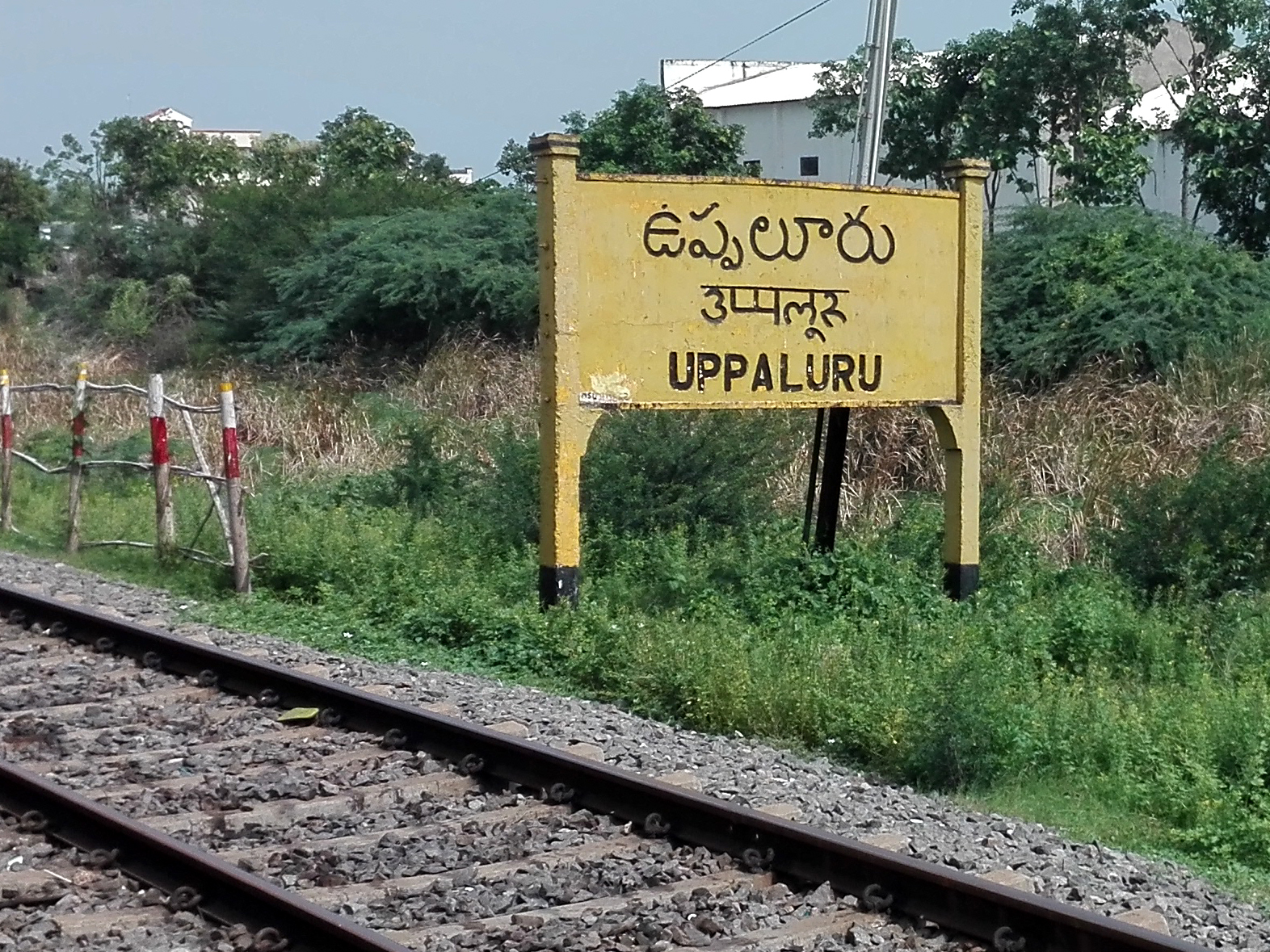
- Uppaluru railway station name board

General information
- Location: India
- Coordinates: 16.2934°N 80.4652°E
- Owner: Government of India
- Operator: Indian Railways
- Line: Vijayawada–Gudivada section

Construction
- Accessible: Disabled access

Services
Preceding station	Indian Railways	Following station
Nidamanuru towards ?	Vijayawada–Nidadavolu loop line	Tenneru towards ?
Location
- Location within India Location within Andhra Pradesh

Uppaluru railway station (station code:UPL), is an Indian Railways station in Nidamanuru town of Andhra Pradesh. It lies on the Vijayawada–Nidadavolu loop line and is administered under Vijayawada railway division of South Coast Railway zone.

== Classification ==
Uppaluru railway station is categorized as a Non-Suburban Grade-6 (NSG-6) station in the Vijayawada railway division.
