= Tenneru Halt railway station =

Railway station in Andhra Pradesh, India

Tenneru Halt
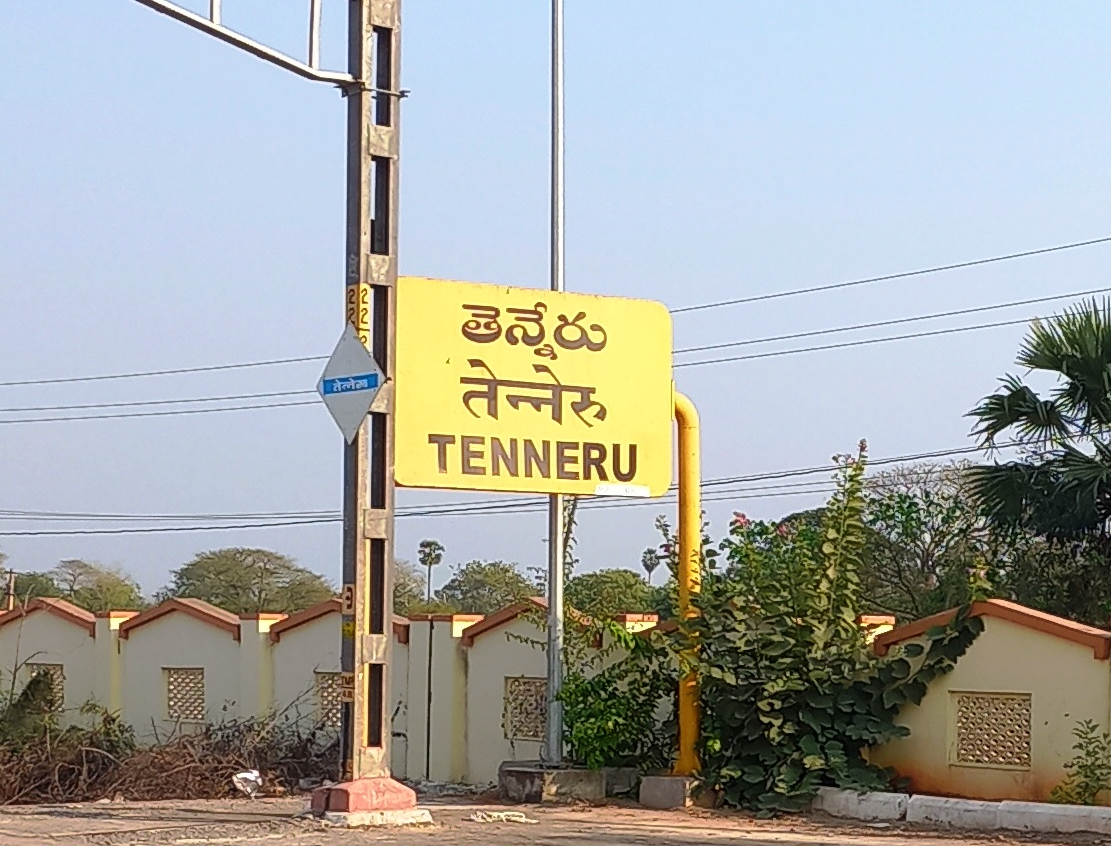

General information
- Location: Tenneru, Andhra Pradesh; India
- Coordinates: 16.4854463°N 80.8199662°E
- Elevation: 21 metres (69 ft)
- System: Indian Railways station
- Owner: Indian Railways
- Line: Vijayawada–Gudivada line

Other information
- Status: Operational
- Station code: TNRU
- Zone(s): South Coast Railway zone
- Division(s): Vijayawada

Services
Preceding station	Indian Railways	Following station
Uppalur towards ?	Vijayawada–Nidadavolu loop line	Tarigoppula towards ?
Location

Tenneru Halt railway station (station code:TNRU), is located in the village of Tenneru in Andhra Pradesh. It serves the villages of Tenneru and Manthena. It lies on the Vijayawada–Nidadavolu loop line and is administered under Vijayawada railway division of South Coast Railway zone
