= GVL =

GVL may refer to:

- gamma-Valerolactone
- Grand Valley Lanthorn, the student newspaper of Grand Valley State University
- Gesellschaft zur Verwertung von Leistungsschutzrechten, a German copyright collection society
- Gudlavalleru railway station, in Andhra Pradesh, India
- Gulay language
- Lee Gilmer Memorial Airport, in Gainesville, Georgia, United States
- Greenville, South Carolina
- Global VM lock, also known as the Global interpreter lock, in interpreter programs
