= Chilakalapudi Halt railway station =

Railway station in Andhra Pradesh, India

Chilakalapudi Halt
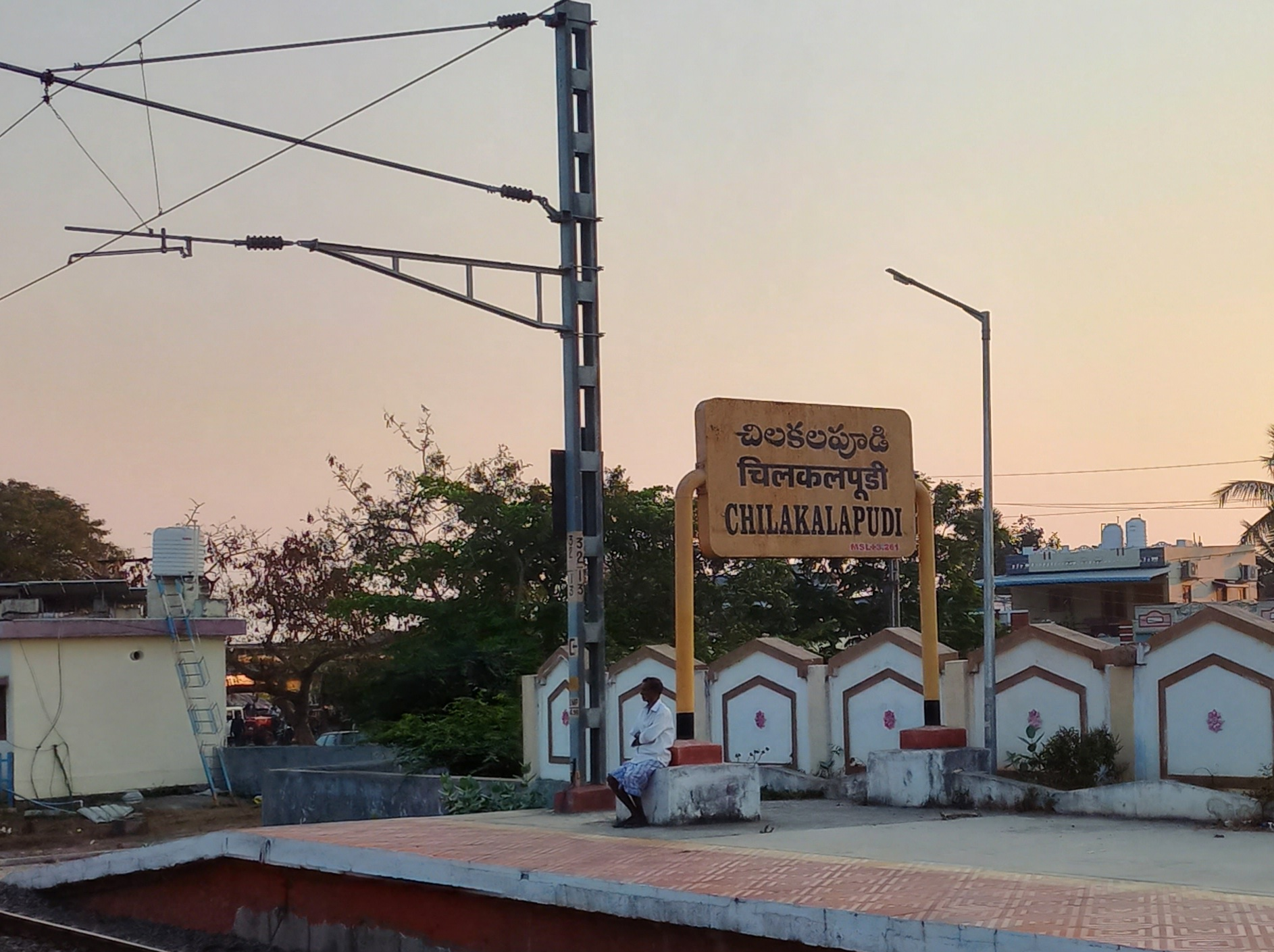

General information
- Location: Chilakalapudi; Machilipatnam Rural; Andhra Pradesh; India
- Coordinates: 16.2026469°N 81.1598991°E
- Operator: Indian Railways
- Line: Gudivada–Machilipatnam branch line
- Platforms: 1

Construction
- Structure type: On ground
- Parking: Available
- Accessible: Disabled access

Other information
- Station code: CLU
- Zone(s): South Coast Railway
- Division(s): Vijayawada

Services
Preceding station	Indian Railways	Following station
Pedana towards ?	Gudivada–Machilipatnam branch line	Machilipatnam towards ?
Location
- Interactive map

Chilakalapudi Halt railway station (station code: CLU) is the penultimate railway station on the Gudivada–Machilipatnam branch line, serving the rail needs of Chilakalapudi. This railway station is administered under Vijayawada railway division of South Coast Railway Zone.
