= Pedana railway station =

Railway station in Andhra Pradesh, India

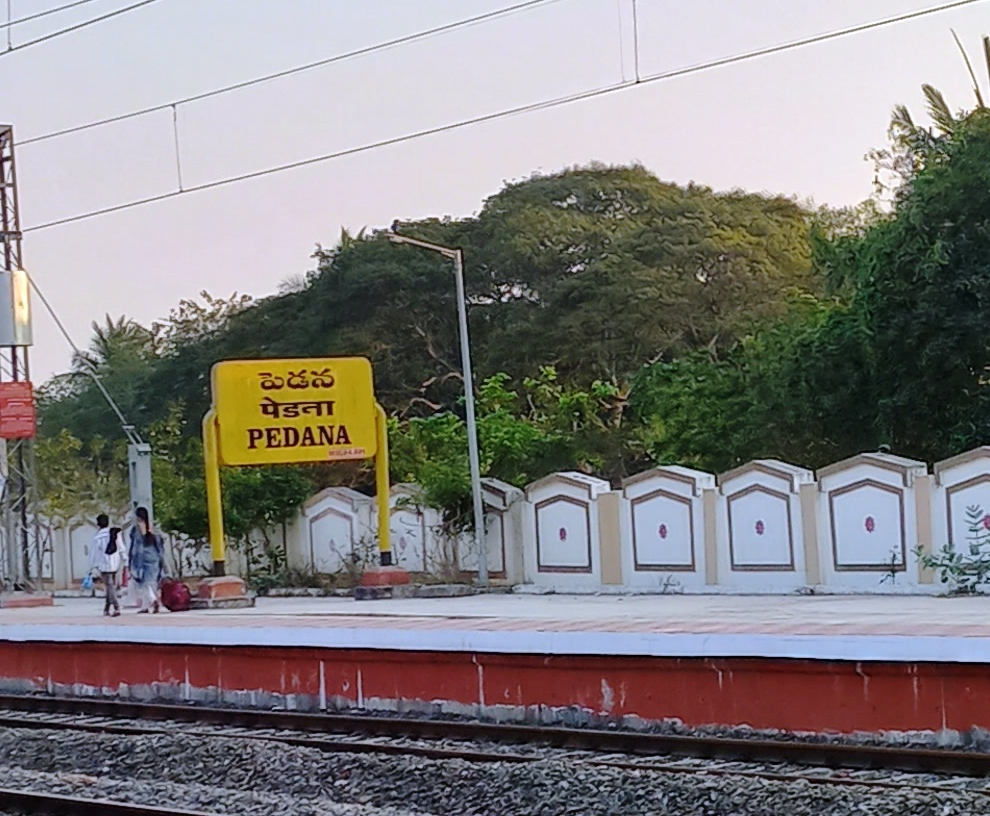

General information
- Location: NH 214A, Pedana, Krishna district, Andhra Pradesh; India
- Coordinates: 16.2522°N 81.1438°E
- Operator: Indian Railways
- Line: Gudivada–Machilipatnam branch line
- Platforms: 2

Construction
- Structure type: On Ground
- Accessible: Disabled access

Other information
- Status: Active
- Station code: PAV
- Zone(s): South Coast Railway
- Division(s): Vijayawada

Services
Preceding station	Indian Railways	Following station
Vadlamannadu towards ?	Gudivada–Machilipatnam branch line	Chilakalapudi towards ?
Location
- Location within Andhra Pradesh Location within India
- Interactive map

Pedana railway station (station code:PAV), is an Indian Railways station in Pedana of Andhra Pradesh. It lies on the Gudivada–Machilipatnam branch line and is administered under Vijayawada railway division of South Coast Railway Zone.

== Classification ==
In terms of earnings and outward passengers handled, Pedana is categorized as a Non-Suburban Grade-5 (NSG-5) railway station. Based on the re–categorization of Indian Railway stations for the period of 2017–18 and 2022–23, an NSG–5 category station earns between ₹1–₹10 crore and handles 1–2 million passengers.
