= NUJ =

NUJ or nuj may refer to:

- Hamadan Airbase (IATA: NUJ), an Islamic Republic of Iran Air Force base located in the Hamadān Province of Iran
- National Union of Journalists, a trade union for journalists in the United Kingdom and Ireland
- Nigeria Union of Journalists, a network of media professionals established to advance the safety and welfare of Nigerian journalists
- Nujella Halt railway station (Indian Railways station code: NUJ), a railway station in Andhra Pradesh, India
- Nyole language (Uganda) (ISO 639-3: nuj), a Bantu language spoken by the Banyole in Butaleja District, Uganda
