= Indupalli railway station =

Railway station in Andhra Pradesh, India

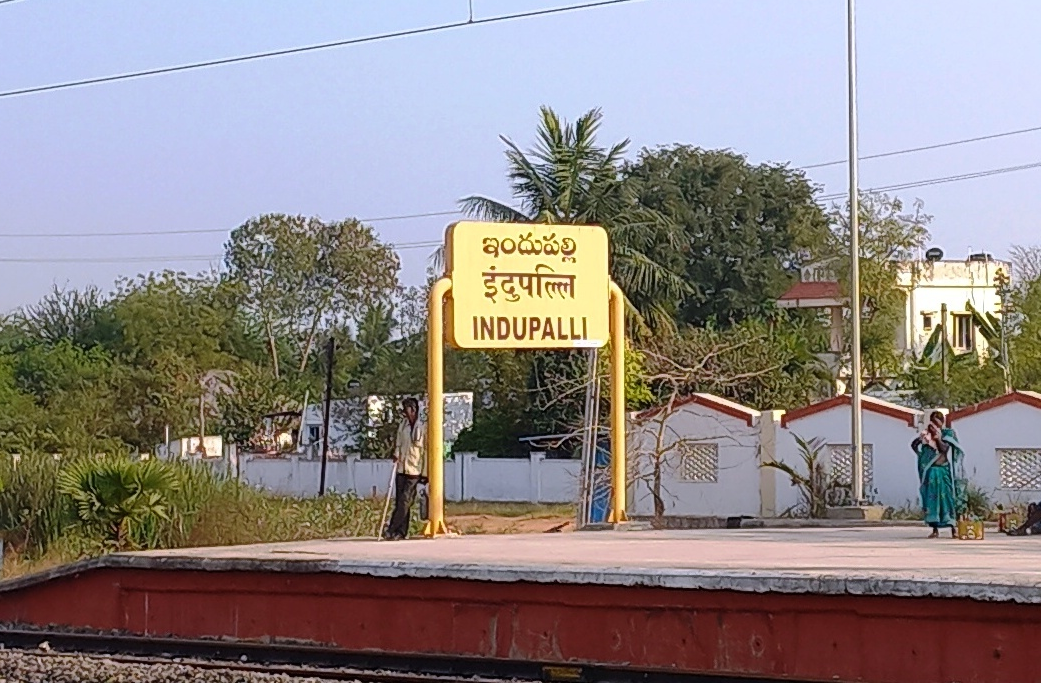

General information
- Location: Indupalli, Andhra Pradesh; India
- Coordinates: 16.4789305°N 80.8760415°E
- Elevation: 21 metres (69 ft)
- Owner: Indian Railways
- Line: Vijayawada–Gudivada line

Other information
- Status: Operational
- Station code: IDP
- Zone(s): South Coast Railway zone
- Division(s): Vijayawada

Services
Preceding station	Indian Railways	Following station
Tarigoppula towards ?	Vijayawada–Nidadavolu loop line	Ventrapragada towards ?
Location
- Location within India Location within Andhra Pradesh

Indupalli railway station (station code:IDP) is located in the village of Indupalli and serves Indupalli and Chikinala. It lies on the Vijayawada–Nidadavolu loop line and is administered under Vijayawada railway division of South Coast Railway zone.
