= Nujella Halt railway station =

Railway station in Gudlavalleru, India

Nujella Halt
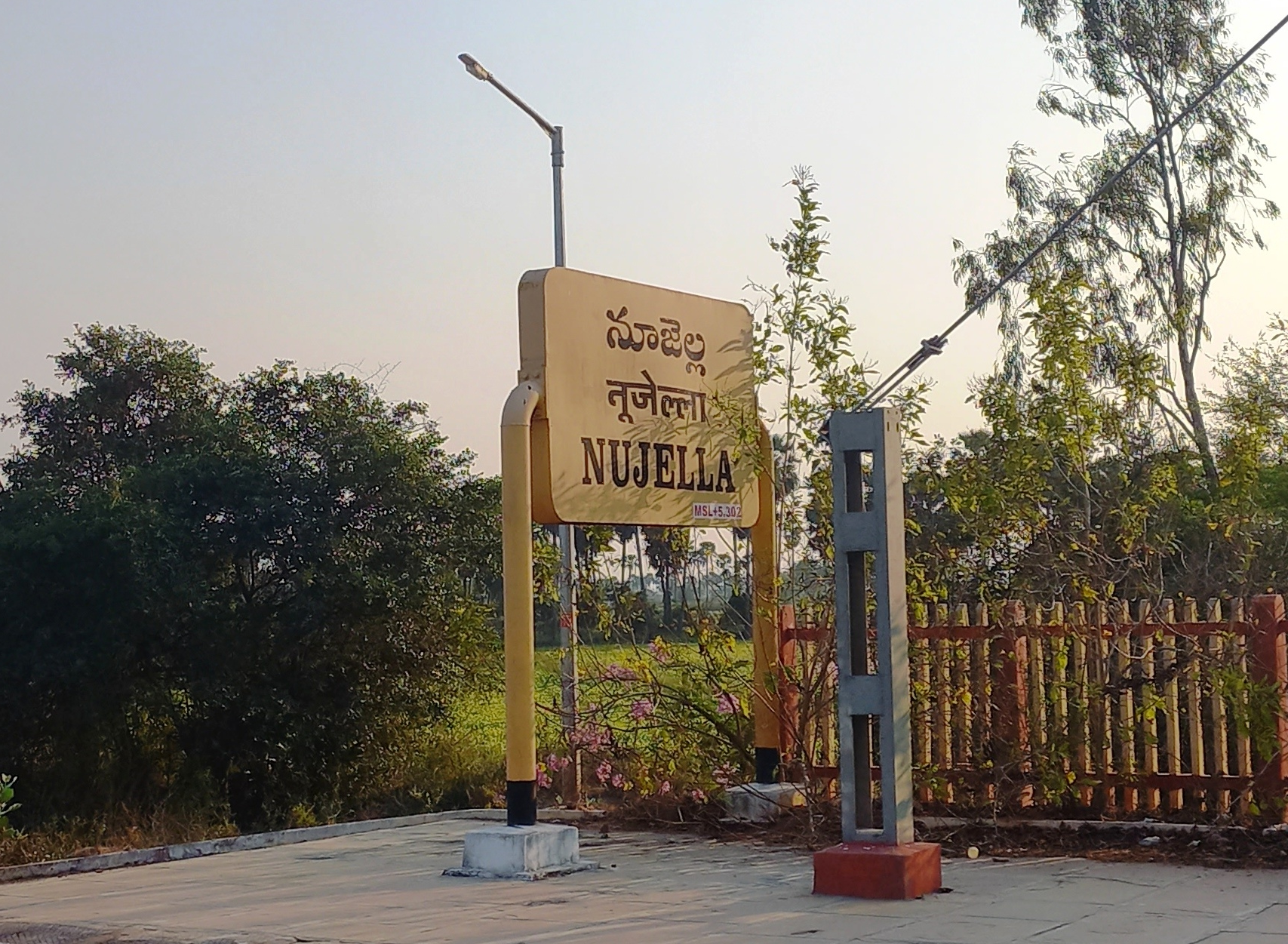

General information
- Location: Nujella, Andhra Pradesh; India
- Coordinates: 16.3867566°N 81.0203515°E
- Elevation: 9 metres (30 ft)
- System: Indian Railways station
- Owner: Indian Railways
- Line: Vijayawada–Gudivada line

Other information
- Status: Operational
- Station code: NUJ
- Zone(s): South Coast Railway zone
- Division(s): Vijayawada

Services
Preceding station	Indian Railways	Following station
Gudivada Junction towards ?	Gudivada–Machilipatnam branch line	Gudlavalleru towards ?
Location
- Interactive map

Nujella Halt railway station (station code:NUJ), serves the rail needs of Gudlavalleru. This is located nearly 11 km (6.8 mi) away from Gudivada. This railway station is administered under Vijayawada railway division of South Coast Railway Zone.
