= Gudlavalleru Halt railway station =

Railway station in Andhra Pradesh, India

Gudlavalleru
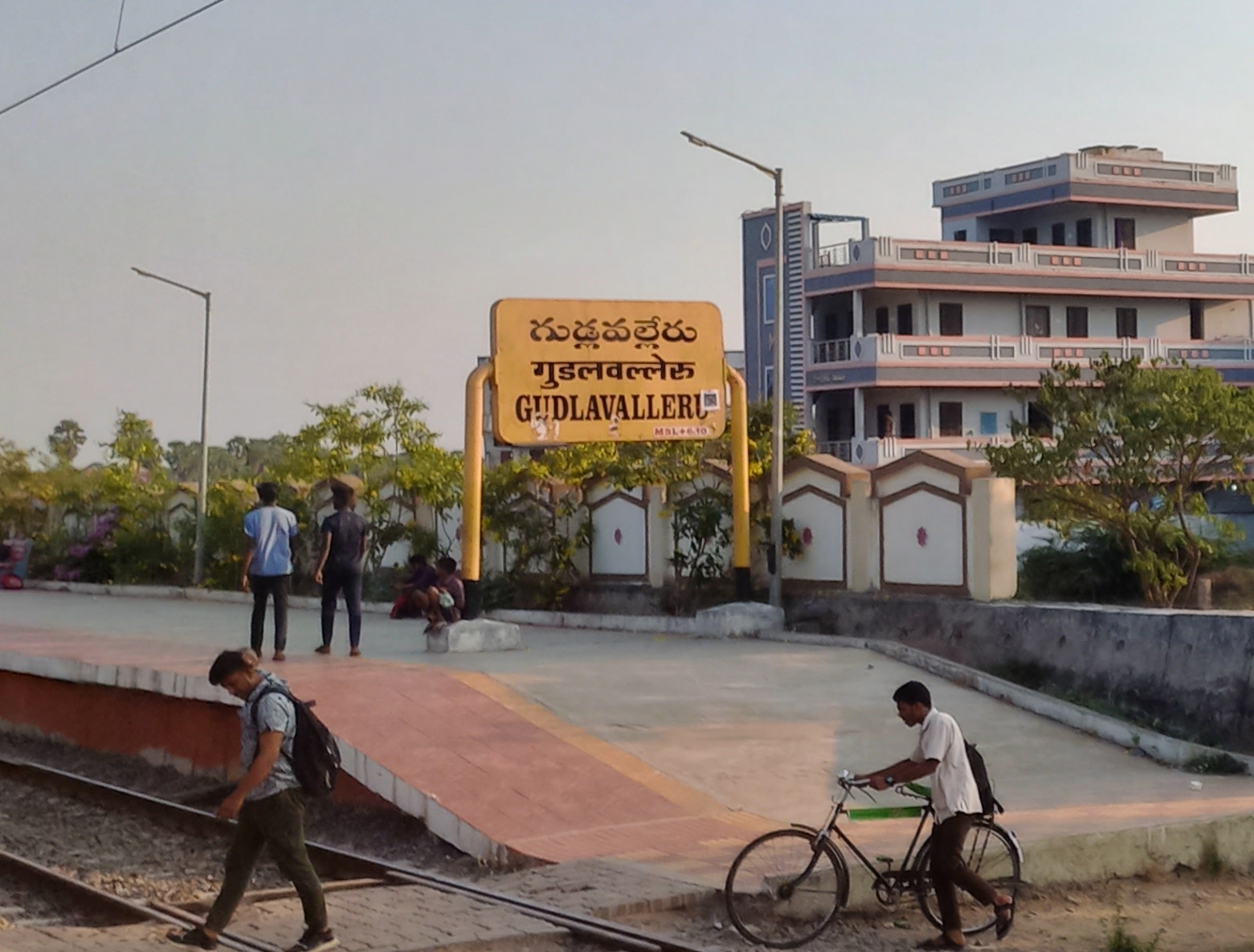

General information
- Location: Gudlavalleru, Andhra Pradesh; India
- Coordinates: 16.3486424°N 81.0443816°E
- Elevation: 21 metres (69 ft)
- System: Indian Railways station
- Owner: Indian Railways
- Line: Vijayawada–Gudivada line

Other information
- Status: Operational
- Station code: GVL
- Zone(s): South Coast Railway zone
- Division(s): Vijayawada

Services
Preceding station	Indian Railways	Following station
Nujella towards ?	Gudivada–Machilipatnam branch line	Kavutaram towards ?
Location
- Interactive map

Gudlavalleru railway station (station code:GVL), serves the rail needs of Gudlavalleru. This is located nearly 11 km away from Gudivada. This railway station is administered under Vijayawada railway division of South Coast Railway Zone.
