= Gudivada Junction railway station =

Railway junction station in Andhra Pradesh, India

Gudivada Junction
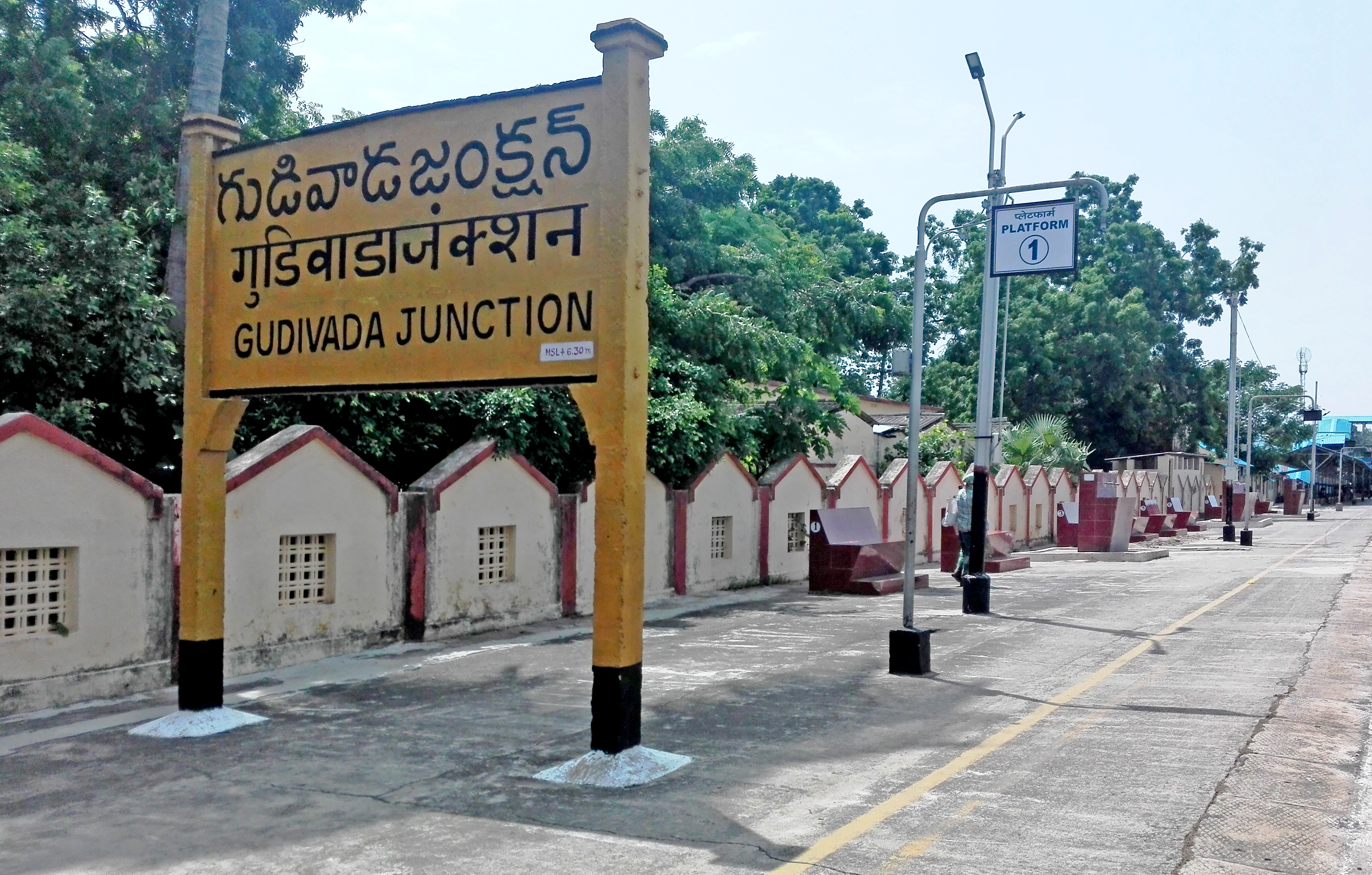

General information
- Location: Gudivada; Krishna district Andhra Pradesh; India
- Coordinates: 16.43°N 80.99°E
- Operator: Indian Railways
- Lines: Vijayawada–Gudivada section, Gudivada–Machilipatnam branch line, Vijayawada-Nidadavolu loop line
- Platforms: 5

Construction
- Structure type: On ground
- Accessible: Disabled access

Other information
- Status: Active
- Station code: GDV
- Zone(s): South Coast Railway
- Division(s): Vijayawada

Services
Preceding station	Indian Railways	Following station
Dosapadu towards ?	Vijayawada–Nidadavolu loop line	Moturu towards ?
Terminus	Gudivada–Machilipatnam branch line	Nujella towards ?
Location
- Location within Andhra Pradesh Location within India
- Interactive map

Gudivada Junction railway station (station code: GDV) is an Indian Railways station in Gudivada of Andhra Pradesh. It is a part of Vijayawada–Nidadavolu loop line, Gudivada–Machilipatnam branch line and is administered under Vijayawada railway division of South Coast Railway zone.

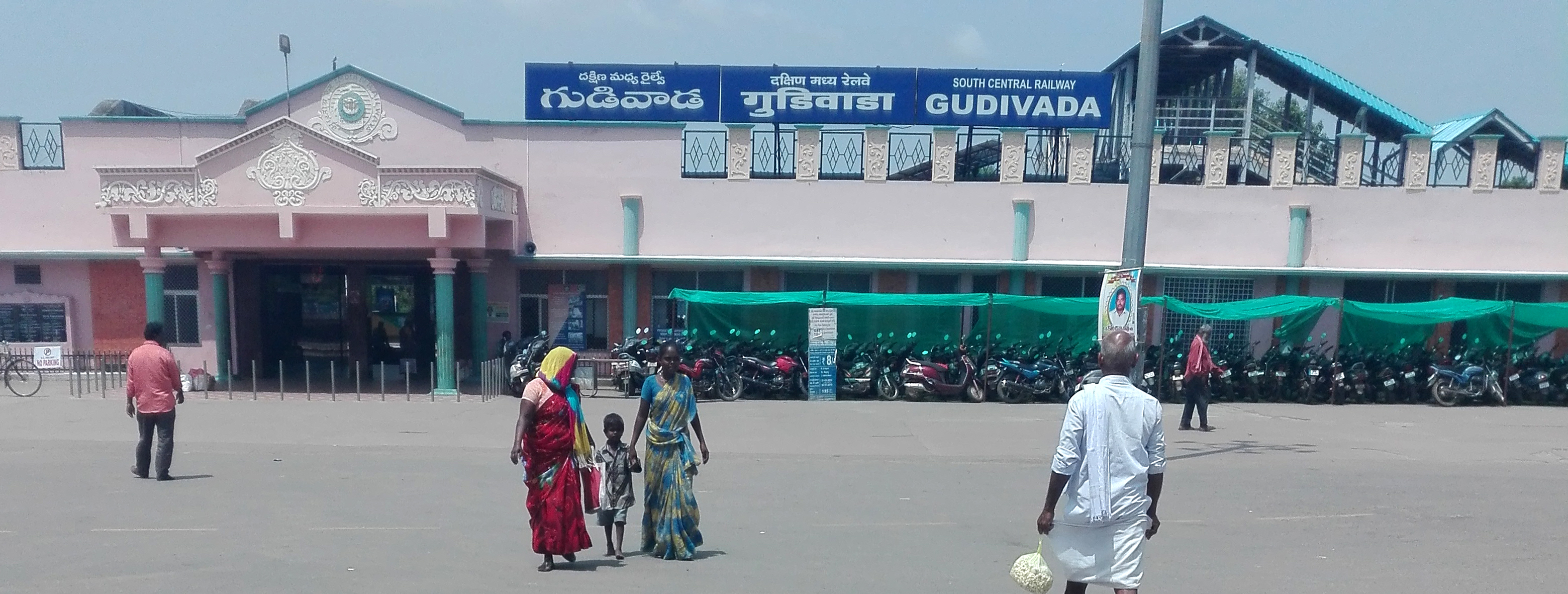
Old photo of Gudivada Junction Railway Station entrance

== History ==
As per Indian Railway History Time Line Bezwada–Masulipatam-79.61 km opened on 4 February 1908. Masulipatam–Masuliptam Port (tidallock)-3.75 km opened on 1 January 1909. (Bezwada-Masulitam Port (tidallock) total km 83.36. Gudivada–Bhimavaram–Gudivada-65.34 km opened on 17 September 1928 by MSMR-SR.

Metre gauge. Two additional light passenger trains each way were introduced on the Gudivada–Masulipatam section, also one additional light train on the Gudivada–Bhimavaram section in 1936–37 Railway Budget

GDV–BVRM broad-gauge railway opened by Jagjivan Ram Railway Minister on 8 October 1961. The first solar powered colour light signals on South Central Railway was provided at LC gate No. 55 near Gudivada station of Vijayawada Division in 2000.

== Classification ==
In terms of earnings and outward passengers handled, Gudivada is categorized as a Non-Suburban Grade-3 (NSG-3) railway station. Based on the re–categorization of Indian Railway stations for the period of 2017–18 and 2022–23, an NSG–3 category station earns between ₹20–₹100 crore and handles 5–10 million passengers.

== Station amenities ==
The major facilities available are waiting rooms, retiring rooms, health unit, elevators, escalators, computerised reservation facility, reservation counter, vehicle parking, railway parcel service etc. It is one of the 38 stations in the division to be equipped with Automatic Ticket Vending Machines (ATVMs).

== Upgradation ==
Gudivada Junction railway station under Amrit Bharat Station Scheme will be upgraded and modernised along with the 1274 other railway stations in India. The scheme envisages improvement of building, integrating the station with both sides of the city, multimodal integration, amenities for divyangjans, sustainable and environment friendly solutions, provision of ballastless tracks, ‘Roof Plazas’ as per necessity, phasing and feasibility and creation of city centres at the station in the long term.
