= Ramavarappadu railway station =

Railway station in Andhra Pradesh, India

Ramavarappadu
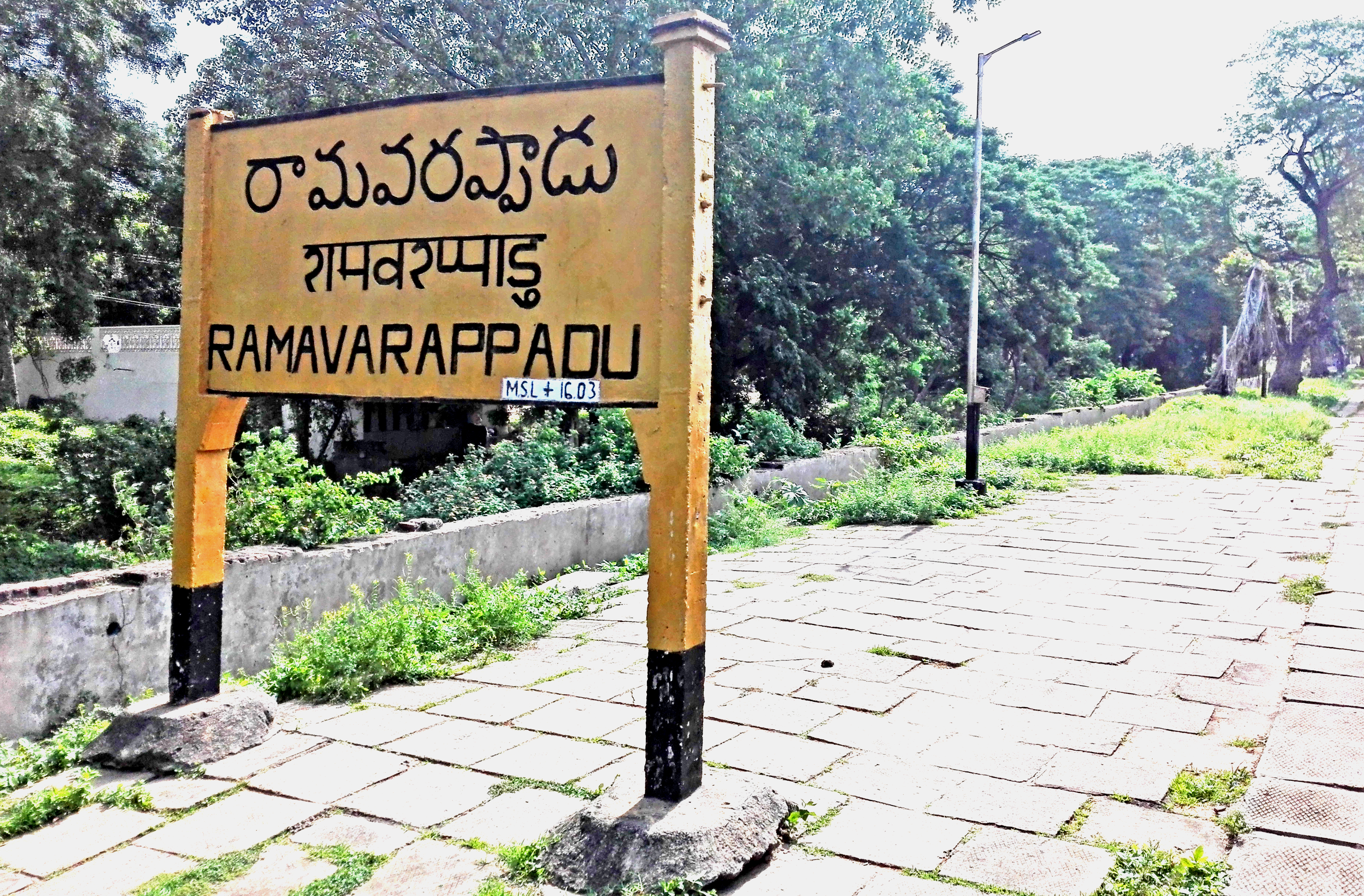

General information
- Location: Ramavarappadu, Vijayawada, Andhra Pradesh; India
- Coordinates: 16.5209°N 80.6829°E
- Elevation: 21 metres (69 ft)
- System: Indian Railways station
- Owner: Indian Railways
- Line: Vijayawada–Gudivada line

Other information
- Status: Operational
- Station code: RMV
- Zone(s): South Coast Railway zone
- Division(s): Vijayawada

Services
Preceding station	Indian Railways	Following station
Madhura Nagar towards ?	Vijayawada–Nidadavolu loop line	Nidamanuru towards ?
Location

Ramavarappadu railway station (station code - RMV) is an Indian Railway station in Vijayawada of Andhra Pradesh. It is situated on Vijayawada–Nidadavolu loop line of Howrah–Chennai main line and is administered by Vijayawada railway division of South Coast Railway zone. It is categorized as a Non-Suburban Grade-6 (NSG-6) station in the division. It is an important station alongside Ramavarappadu, for devotees during the annual Mary Matha festival, celebrated at Gunadala Matha Shrine.

== Classification ==
In terms of earnings and outward passengers handled, Ramavarappadu is categorized as a Non-Suburban Grade-6 (NSG-6) railway station. Based on the re–categorization of Indian Railway stations for the period of 2017–18 and 2022–23, an NSG–6 category station earns nearly ₹1 crore and handles close to 1 million passengers.
