= Ventrapragada Halt railway station =

Railway station in Andhra Pradesh, India

Ventrapragada Halt
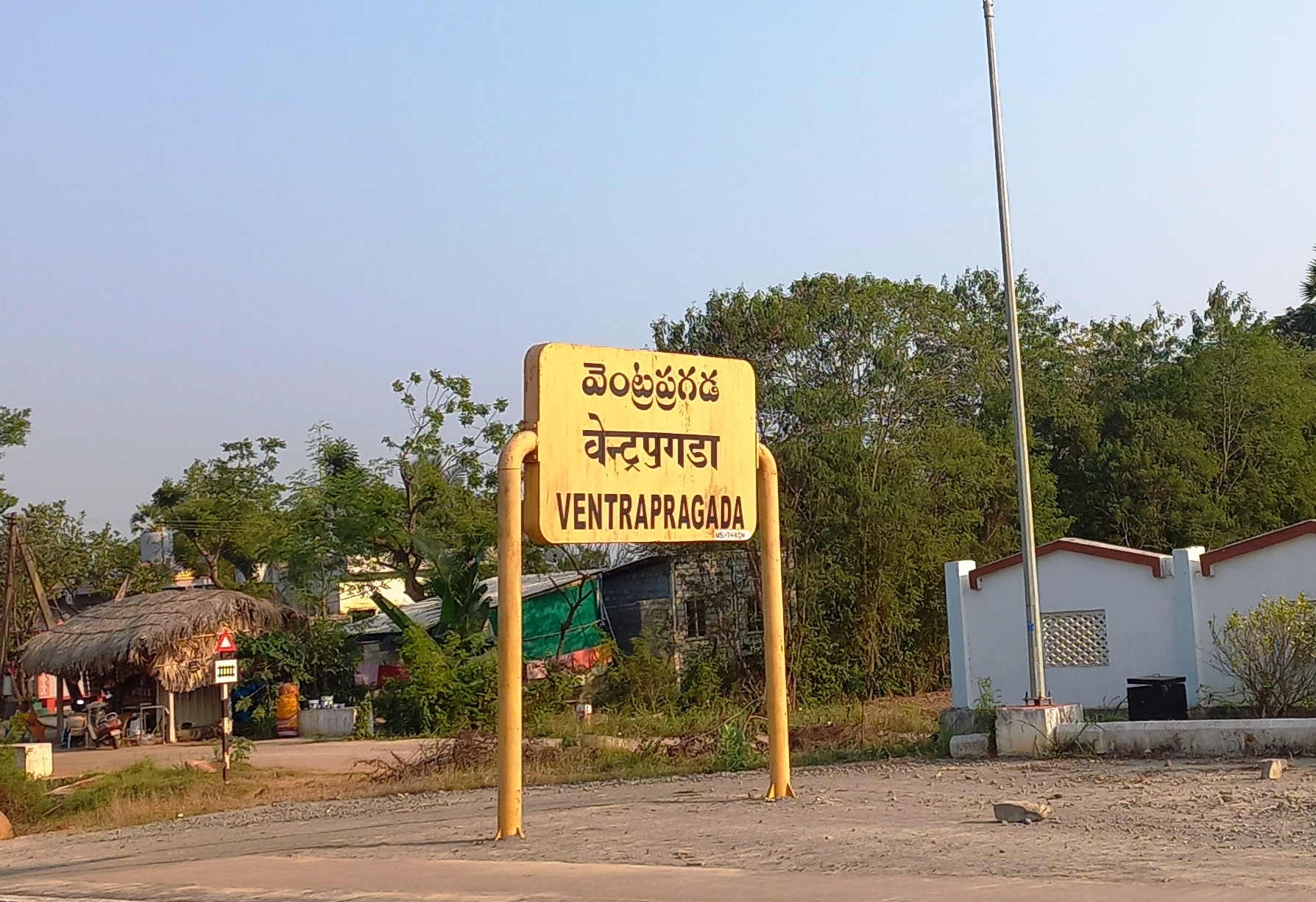

General information
- Location: Ventrapragada, Andhra Pradesh; India
- Coordinates: 16.4810122°N 80.8737969°E
- Elevation: 8 metres (26 ft)
- System: Indian Railways station
- Owner: Indian Railways
- Line: Vijayawada–Gudivada line

Other information
- Status: Operational
- Station code: VPG
- Zone(s): South Coast Railway zone
- Division(s): Vijayawada

Services
Preceding station	Indian Railways	Following station
Indupalli towards ?	Vijayawada–Nidadavolu loop line	Dosapadu towards ?
Location

Ventrapragada Halt railway station (station code:VPG) is located on the outskirts of the village of Ventrapragada in the state of Andhra Pradesh. It lies on the Vijayawada–Nidadavolu loop line and is administered under Vijayawada railway division of South Coast Railway Zone.
