= Nidamanuru railway station =

Railway station in Andhra Pradesh, India

Nidamanuru
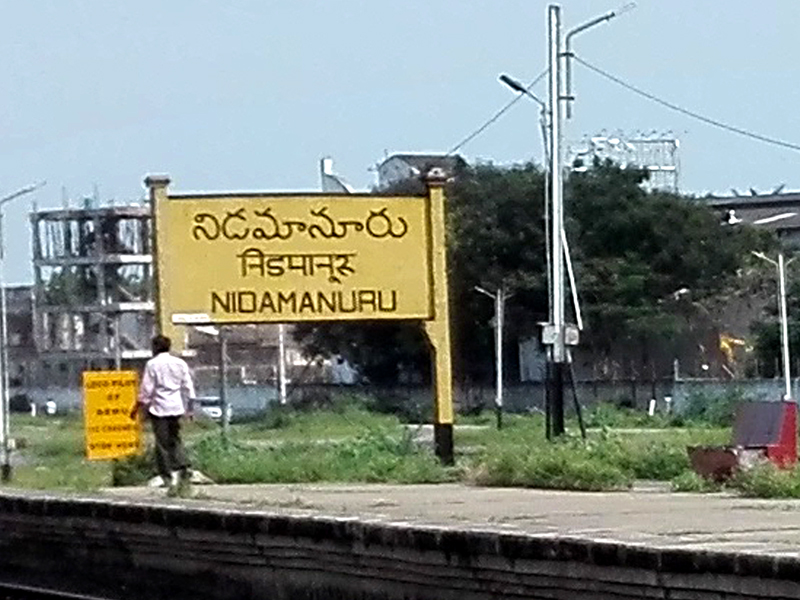

General information
- Location: Nidamanuru, Vijayawada; India
- Coordinates: 16.110°N 80.4943°E
- Owner: Government of India
- Operator: Indian Railways
- Line: Vijayawada–Gudivada section

Construction
- Accessible: Disabled access

Other information
- Station code: NDM
- Zone(s): South Coast Railway Zone
- Division(s): Vijayawada

Services
Preceding station	Indian Railways	Following station
Ramavarappadu towards ?	Vijayawada–Nidadavolu loop line	Uppalur towards ?
Location
- Location within India Location within Andhra Pradesh

Nidamanuru railway station (station code:NDM) is a railway station in Vijayawada, India, that lies on the Vijayawada–Nidadavolu loop line and is administered under Vijayawada railway division of South Coast Railway Zone.

== Classification ==
In terms of earnings and outward passengers handled, Nidamanuru is categorized as a Non-Suburban Grade-6 (NSG-6) railway station. Based on the re–categorization of Indian Railway stations for the period of 2017–18 and 2022–23, an NSG–6 category station earns nearly ₹1 crore and handles close to 1 million passengers.
