= Madhuranagar Halt railway station =

Railway station in Andhra Pradesh, India

Madhuranagar Halt
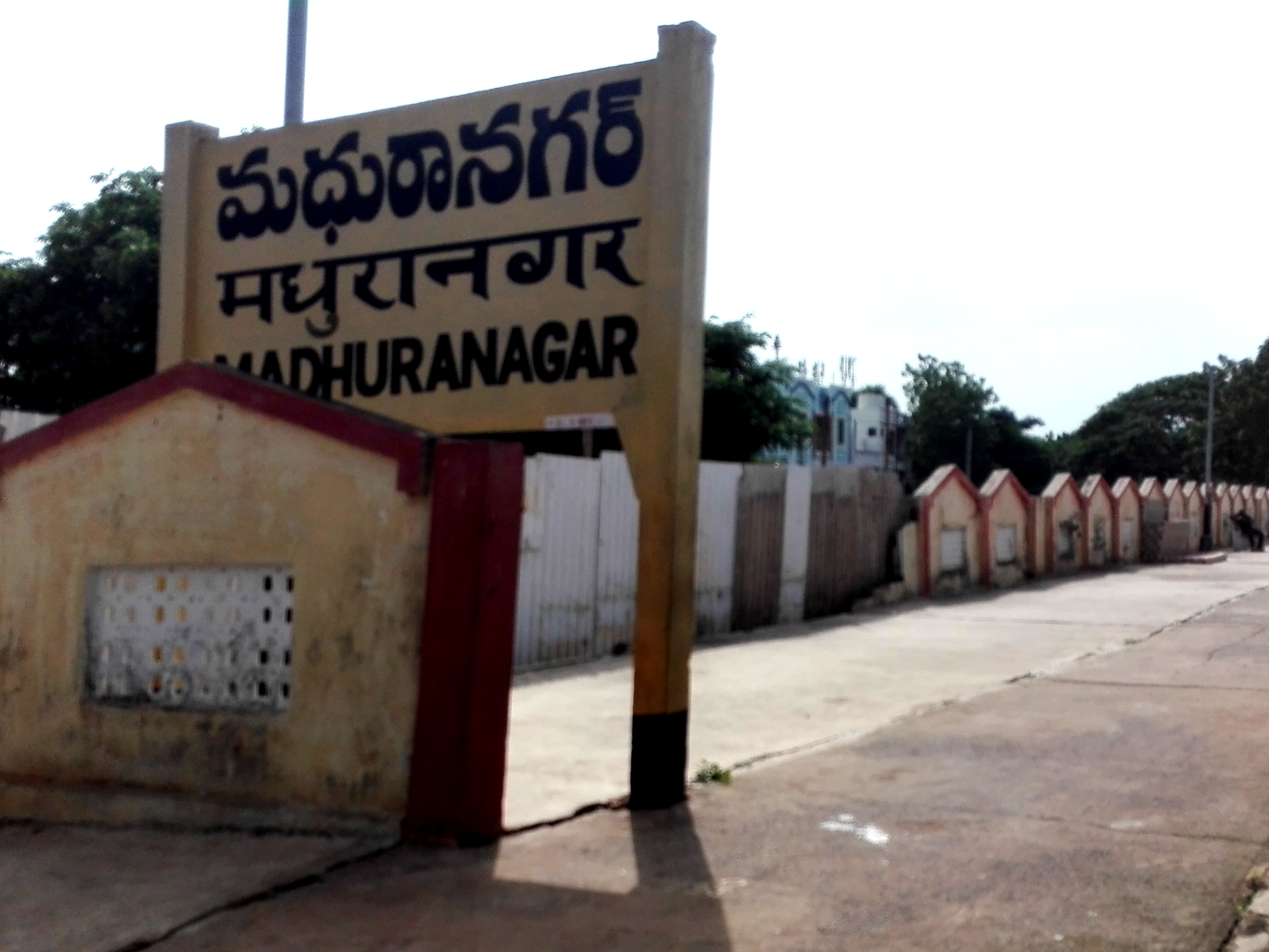
- Madhuranagar railway station in Vijayawada

General information
- Location: Madhuranagar, Vijayawada, NTR district, Andhra Pradesh; India
- Coordinates: 16°06′36″N 80°29′39″E
- Owner: Indian Railways
- Operator: Indian Railways
- Lines: Vijayawada–Gudivada section; Vijayawada–Machilipatnam branch line
- Platforms: 2

Construction
- Structure type: Standard (on ground)
- Accessible: Disabled access

Other information
- Station code: MDUN
- Zone(s): SCoR
- Division(s): Vijayawada
- Classification: HG-2

History
- Opened: 1899

Services
Preceding station	Indian Railways	Following station
Vijayawada towards ?	Vijayawada–Gudivada section	Ramavarappadu towards ?
Route map
Location
- Location within India Location within Andhra Pradesh

Madhuranagar railway station (station code - MDUN) located at City of Vijayawada (station code:MDUN), is an Indian Railways station located in Andhra Pradesh. It is situated on Duvvada–Vijayawada section of Vijayawada railway division in South Coast Railway zone.

== Classification ==
It falls under HG-2 railway station category.
