= Andhra Pradesh Metro Rail Corporation =

Public transport company

Andhra Pradesh Metro Rail Corporation (APMRC)
- Type: State-owned
- Industry: Public transport
- Predecessor: Amaravathi Metro Rail Corporation
- Successor: APMRC
- Headquarters: Vijayawada, India
- Number of locations: 2
- Key people: U.J.M. Rao IRAS (Managing Director)
- Services: Vijayawada Metro, Visakhapatnam Metro
- Owner: Government of Andhra Pradesh
- Website: amrc.ap.gov.in

The Andhra Pradesh Metro Rail Corporation (APMRC) is a public sector company in the state of Andhra Pradesh, India headquartered in Vijayawada, that operates the Vijayawada Metro and Visakhapatnam Metro. Initially, it was incorporated as Amaravati Metro Rail Corporation (AMRC), a Special Purpose Vehicle (SPV) for the implementation of the Vijayawada Metro Rail project. Later, the Visakhapatnam Metro Rail Project was added to the list. It was first proposed as a Mass Rapid Transit System in VGTM UDA, which was later changed into Amaravati Metropolitan Region Development Authority (AMRDA).

== History ==
The APMRC was created on 29 October 2015 with N.P. Ramakrishna Reddy as its first managing director. This project was first initiated as a Medium Metro rail project, designed by the Delhi Metro Rail Corporation (DMRC). However, it was rejected by the Government of India in New Delhi due to financial issues. The Government of Andhra Pradesh then opted for a Light Metro rail system, but faced opposition from engineer E. Sreedharan, who was serving as an advisor for the central government in New Delhi regarding both metro projects. E. Sreedharan stated that the Light Metro system would not meet the needs of Andhra Pradesh's capital city, Amaravati, so the memorandum of understanding (MoU) between APMRC and DMRC was revoked. Since the central government refused to fund the projects, the Andhra Pradesh state government decided to undertake them with financial support from companies in Korea and Malaysia.

== Projects ==
=== Systems in development ===
As of 6 October 2026

Under construction
Centre approved DPR
Central DPR appraisal
Centre rejected DPR
State approved DPR
DPR submitted
DPR under preparation
On hold

System	Locale	Length		Construction began	Planned opening
System	Locale	Under construction	Planned	Construction began	Planned opening
Visakhapatnam Metro	Visakhapatnam		76.9 km (47.8 mi)	2026	2029
Vijayawada Metro	Vijayawada		75 km (47 mi)	2026	2029
Total			151.9 km (94.4 mi)		
