= Vijayawada Metro =

Planned Rapid transit system

Overview
- Owner: Andhra Pradesh Metro Rail Corporation
- Locale: Andhra Pradesh Capital Region
- Transit type: Rapid transit
- Number of lines: 3 (Planned)
- Number of stations: 52 (Planned)
- Website: amrc.ap.gov.in/vijayawada-metro

Technical
- System length: 66.2 km (41.1 mi) (Planned)
System map
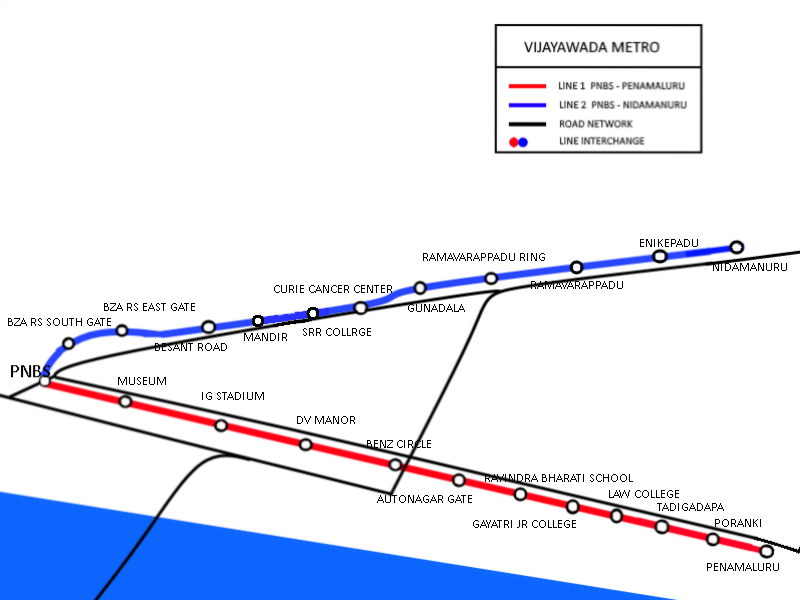

Vijayawada Metro is a planned rapid transit system for the city of Vijayawada, located in the state of Andhra Pradesh, India. The approved Detailed Project Report (DPR) consists of three lines with a total length of 74.2 kilometres.

In December 2024, the Government of India approved the Phase-I of two metro rail projects with an estimated cost of ₹11,498 crore for the Visakhapatnam Metro and ₹11,009 crore for the Vijayawada Metro.

== History ==
Following the bifurcation of Andhra Pradesh in 2014, Andhra Pradesh Chief Minister Chandrababu Naidu announced plans to construct a brand new capital in Amaravati with Vijayawada as its gateway. As part of this plan the government announced its plans to build a metro system in Vijayawada. Initially, the government explored ideas to link Vijayawada to nearby cities such as Tenali and Guntur using the metro system. This idea was later cancelled and it was announced that the metro would stay confined to the city.

The Andhra Pradesh government announced that it had appointed the Delhi Metro Rail Corporation (DMRC) to prepare a Detailed Project Report (DPR) for the city. The DPR submitted by DMRC proposed two routes. The first corridor would run from the Pandit Nehru Bus Station (PNBS) to Penamaluru and the second corridor would run from Pandit Nehru Bus Station (PNBS) to Nidamanuru via Vijayawada Airport. The two corridors were proposed to be fully elevated and totaled to a distance of 26.03 km (16.17 mi) with an estimated cost of ₹6,823 crore (US$730 million). The project was then submitted to the ministry of urban affairs for approval. Following this, DMRC invited tenders for the construction of the two corridors on 25 September 2015. However, the tenders were later cancelled due to the central governments new Metro Rail policy, which increased the scrutiny regarding ridership and cost projections. Later DMRC ended its MoU with the Amaravati Metro Rail Corporation, which forced the AMRC to explore a PPP alternative to build the metro lines.

Due to the new policy, the government revised the line from a heavy-rail based mass rapid transit system to a Light Rail Transit System. The new plan involved building a 66.2 km (41.1 mi) network with a cost of ₹15,000 crore (US$1.6 billion). However, unlike the previous plan, the plan would see construction spread across Gannavaram – Vijayawada – Amaravati across three different phases. The revised DPR was then submitted by SYSTRA – RITES – GOPA JV to the government in April 2019.

However, following the 2019 Andhra Pradesh elections, former chief minister, Jagan Mohan Reddy announced he was putting the project on hold. This was part of the government's broader plan to revise its plans of constructing Amaravati as the sole capital of the state. Later in 2020, the government announced that the Amaravati Metro Rail Corporation (AMRC) would be renamed the Andhra Pradesh Metro Rail Corporation (APMRC).

Once again however, following the 2024 Andhra Pradesh election Chief Minister Chandrababu Naidu announced that both the Vijayawada and Visakhapatnam Metro would be back on track. The government approved the new DPRs for Vijayawada and Visakhapatnam. In March 2025, it was announced Systra would be tasked with the responsibility of updating the comprehensive mobility plans (CMP) for Visakhapatnam and Vijayawada metro. Soon the government also announced that the land acquisition for the project would resume after it was put on hold in 2019. The revised CMP was submitted to the state government who approved it later. The state government then forwarded the updated CMP and brand new DPRs to the central government for approval. On 28 July 2025, the Andhra Pradesh Metro Rail Corporation invited bids for the initial civil contract of the Vijayawada Metro Rail Project, worth ₹4,150 crore (US$440 million). The civil contract concerns the design, construction and engineering of a 4.33 kilometres (2.69 mi) double-decker, four-lane flyover-cum-metro viaduct, one underground metro station, and thirty-two elevated metro stations. The project will be executed on an EPC basis, with an overall completion period of thirty months from the commencement date, with a dedicated period of 24 months comprising the double-decker flyover segment.

== Construction phases ==
The Vijayawada Metro project is planned to be developed in two phases. In December 2024, the Government of Andhra Pradesh approved the Detailed Project Report (DPR) for Phase I, comprising two corridors with a combined length of 38.40 km and an estimated cost of ₹11,009 crore.

=== Phase 1 ===
Phase 1 consists of two corridors connecting Vijayawada with Gannavaram and Penamaluru. The proposed network has a total length of 38.40 km and includes 33 stations, comprising 32 elevated stations and one underground station.

In July 2025, Andhra Pradesh Metro Rail Corporation Limited (APMRCL) invited bids for the construction of elevated viaducts and stations under Phase I. As of January 2026, the project was awaiting final approval and funding from the Central Government, and construction contracts had not yet been awarded.

Phase 1 network
Corridor	Terminals		Stations	Distance (km)	Status
1	Pandit Nehru Bus Station	Penamaluru	12	12.50 km (7.77 mi)	Approved
2	Pandit Nehru Bus Station	Nidamanuru	13	25.90 km (16.09 mi)	Approved
2	Nidamanuru	Gannavaram Bus Stand	8	25.90 km (16.09 mi)	Approved
Total			33	38.40 km (23.86 mi)	

=== Phase 2 ===
Phase 2 proposes an additional metro corridor extending from Pandit Nehru Bus Station (PNBS) to Amaravati Reservoir Station, with a proposed length of approximately 27.75 km. The corridor is intended to improve connectivity between Vijayawada and the Andhra Pradesh capital region. Its implementation is planned for a later stage.

Phase 2 network
Corridor	Terminals		Stations	Distance (km)	Status
1	Pandit Nehru Bus Station	Amaravati Reservoir Station	19	27.80 km (17.27 mi)	Proposed
Total			19	27.80 km (17.27 mi)	

== Stations ==
There are 3 corridors currently proposed for the metro system. The first proposed corridor runs from Pandit Nehru Bus Station to Penamaluru has 12 proposed station, all of which are elevated. The second proposed corridor runs from Pandit Nehru Bus Station to Ganavaram Bus Stand and has a total of 22 stations of which 21 are elevated and 1 is underground. The third proposed corridor runs from Pandit Nehru Bus Station to Amaravati Reservoir Station and has a total of 19 stations of which 3 are proposed to be elevated and 16 are underground.

Vijayawada Metro Stations
Corridor	1		2		3	
sno	PNBS to Gannavaram Bus Stand	Layout	PNBS to Penamaluru	Layout	PNBS to Amaravati Reservoir Station	Layout
1	PNBS	Elevated	PNBS	Elevated	PNBS	Elevated
2	Railway Station South	Elevated	Victoria Jubilee Museum	Elevated	Mahanadu	Elevated
3	Railway Station East	Elevated	Municipal Stadium	Elevated	Krishna Canal Junction	Elevated
4	Besant Road	Elevated	Tikkle Road	Elevated	Polkampadu	Underground
5	Seetharampuram Signal	Elevated	Benz Circle	Elevated	Undavalli Centre	Underground
6	Machavaram Down	Elevated	Auto Nagar	Elevated	Undavalli	Underground
7	Padavalarevu	Elevated	Ashok Nagar	Elevated	Venkata Palem (East)	Underground
8	Gunadala	Elevated	Krishna Nagar	Elevated	Venkata Palem (West)	Underground
9	Ramavarappadu Ring	Elevated	Kanuru Centre	Elevated	Tallaya Palem	Underground
10	Prasadampadu	Elevated	Tadigadapa	Elevated	Mandadam	Underground
11	MBT Center	Elevated	Poranki	Elevated	Uddandrayuni Palem	Underground
12	Enikepadu	Elevated	Penamaluru	Elevated	Lingaya Palem	Underground
13	Nidamanuru	Elevated			The Square Station	Underground
14	Nidamanuru Railway Station	Elevated			Central Park Station	Underground
15	Sri Chaitanya College	Elevated			Ceremonial Space Station	Underground
16	Gudavali	Elevated			Assembly Station	Underground
17	Velpuru	Elevated			FG Station	Underground
18	Kesarapalle	Elevated			GH Station	Underground
19	Airport	Underground			Amaravati Reservoir Station	Underground
20	Yogashram	Elevated				
21	Gannavaram	Elevated				
22	Gannavaram Bus Stand	Elevated				

== See also ==
- Urban rail transit in India
  - Andhra Pradesh Metro Rail Corporation
    - Visakhapatnam Metro
- Transport in Vijayawada
