= Dosapadu =

- village
- Interactive map of Dosapadu
- Location in Andhra Pradesh, India Dosapadu (India)
- Coordinates: 16°28′N 80°57′E
- Country: India
- State: Andhra Pradesh

Population (2011)
  - Total: 1,870

Languages
  - Official: Telugu
- Time zone: UTC+5:30 (IST)

Dosapadu is a village in Krishna District in the Indian state of Andhra Pradesh. It is located about 35 kilometres (22 mi) from Vijayawada and 15 kilometres (9.3 mi) from Gudivada, the nearest commercial center.

Between 1956 and 1995, 105 acres of land in the village were allocated to 45 landless dalit families. The allocated land was later taken over by landlords, causing an ongoing legal struggle from 2007 onwards.
