= Victory Playground, Hyderabad =

Sports venture in Hyderabad, India

Victory Playground, commonly known as VPG, is a playground located in, Chaderghat, Hyderabad, India. It has playing areas for cricket, volleyball, basketball, skating etc. It is popular during school vacations for its summer camps in sports and games.

== History ==
VPG was opened in 1972 and is located at Chaderghat in Hyderabad.

== Cricket ==
There are cricket training nets and they are popular during the summer.

== Volleyball ==
Volleyball courts are popular with both professionals and beginners. The summer camp is very popular among children.

== Basketball ==
The basketball court is popular for its training especially during the summer.
