= Visakhapatnam Metro =

Planned Rapid transit system in Andhra Pradesh, India

Overview
- Owner: Andhra Pradesh Metro Rail Corporation
- Locale: Visakhapatnam, Andhra Pradesh, India
- Transit type: Rapid transit
- Number of lines: 4 (Planned)
- Number of stations: 54 (Planned)
- Website: amrc.ap.gov.in/visakhapatnam-metro

Technical
- System length: 76.9 km (47.8 mi) (Planned)

Visakhapatnam Metro, also called Vizag Metro, is a planned metro rail system in Visakhapatnam, Andhra Pradesh, India. It is planned to serve the city and nearby areas. The project is being developed by the Andhra Pradesh Metro Rail Corporation (APMRCL).

The metro project has undergone several changes since it was first proposed in the 2010s. A proposal from 2024 included four routes covering about 76.9 km, with 54 stations. One of the proposed routes would connect the city to Bhogapuram Airport.

Different funding options have been considered for the project, including a public–private partnership (PPP). As of August 2026, construction of the metro system had not started.

== History ==
=== Initial proposal ===
The Government of Andhra Pradesh approved an early detailed project report (DPR) for a 42.55 km metro network comprising three corridors, with an estimated cost of ₹10,111 crore. It submitted the proposal to the central government in November 2015. The central government subsequently advised the state to examine a public–private partnership model and returned the DPR in September 2017 for revision in accordance with the Metro Rail Policy, 2017.

=== Revised network ===
The project was subsequently expanded to include a proposed airport connection. In April 2022, APMRCL officials described a revised 76.9 km network with 54 stations and two depots, estimated at ₹14,309 crore.

In February 2024, a committee of the Union government's Department of Economic Affairs considered APMRCL's request for financial assistance towards transaction advisory services for a public–private partnership. The proposal envisaged a design–build–finance–operate–transfer arrangement. The committee record referred to a 76.9 km, four-corridor plan and a project cost of ₹14,309 crore; the application concerned advisory expenditure rather than approval of construction funding.

In November 2024, the Andhra Pradesh government described an estimated project cost of ₹17,232 crore at 2024 prices, with 46.23 km proposed for the first phase and 30.67 km for the second phase.

=== Developments in 2025 and 2026 ===
In July 2025, the state government announced plans to invite tenders for the Visakhapatnam and Vijayawada metro projects. Reporting at the time cited an estimated ₹11,498 crore for the Visakhapatnam project under a revised financing plan.

The Visakhapatnam district administration published a notification in June 2025 for a social impact assessment relating to land acquisition for the project's first phase. In February 2026, a public consultation was held as part of the assessment process. The first-phase corridors were reported to cover 46.23 km, with private and government land identified for potential acquisition. The district administration published a social impact assessment appraisal report in April 2026.

In August 2026, media reports stated that the DPRs for the Visakhapatnam and Vijayawada metro projects had been forwarded for financial appraisal. A separate report the same month said the Visakhapatnam project had yet to commence construction and that proposed double-decker flyover arrangements were under review.

== Construction phases ==
The Visakhapatnam Metro project is proposed to be developed in two phases. Under the November 2024 plan, Phase 1 would cover approximately 46.23 km across three corridors, while Phase 2 would cover 30.67 km and connect the city to Bhogapuram Airport.

=== Phase 1 ===
Phase 1 is planned to include three corridors, covering approximately 46.23 km with 42 stations. The Government of Andhra Pradesh approved the detailed project report for the first phase in December 2024.

Corridor	Route	Length (km)	Stations	Status
Corridor 1	Steel Plant Junction – Kommadi	34.40	29	Proposed
Corridor 2	Gurudwara Junction – Old Post Office	5.07	6	Proposed
Corridor 3	Tadichetlapalem – Chinna Waltair	6.75	7	Proposed
Total		46.23	42	

=== Phase 2 ===
Phase 2 is planned to extend the metro network from Kommadi to Bhogapuram Airport, covering approximately 30.67 km with 12 proposed stations. The airport corridor was included in the second phase of the November 2024 proposal.

Corridor	Route	Length (km)	Stations	Status
Corridor 4	Kommadi – Bhogapuram Airport	30.67	12	Proposed
Total		30.67	12	

== See also ==
- Urban rail transit in India
  - Andhra Pradesh Metro Rail Corporation
    - Vijayawada Metro
- Transport in Visakhapatnam
