= Machilipatnam railway station =

Railway station in Andhra Pradesh, India

Machilipatnam
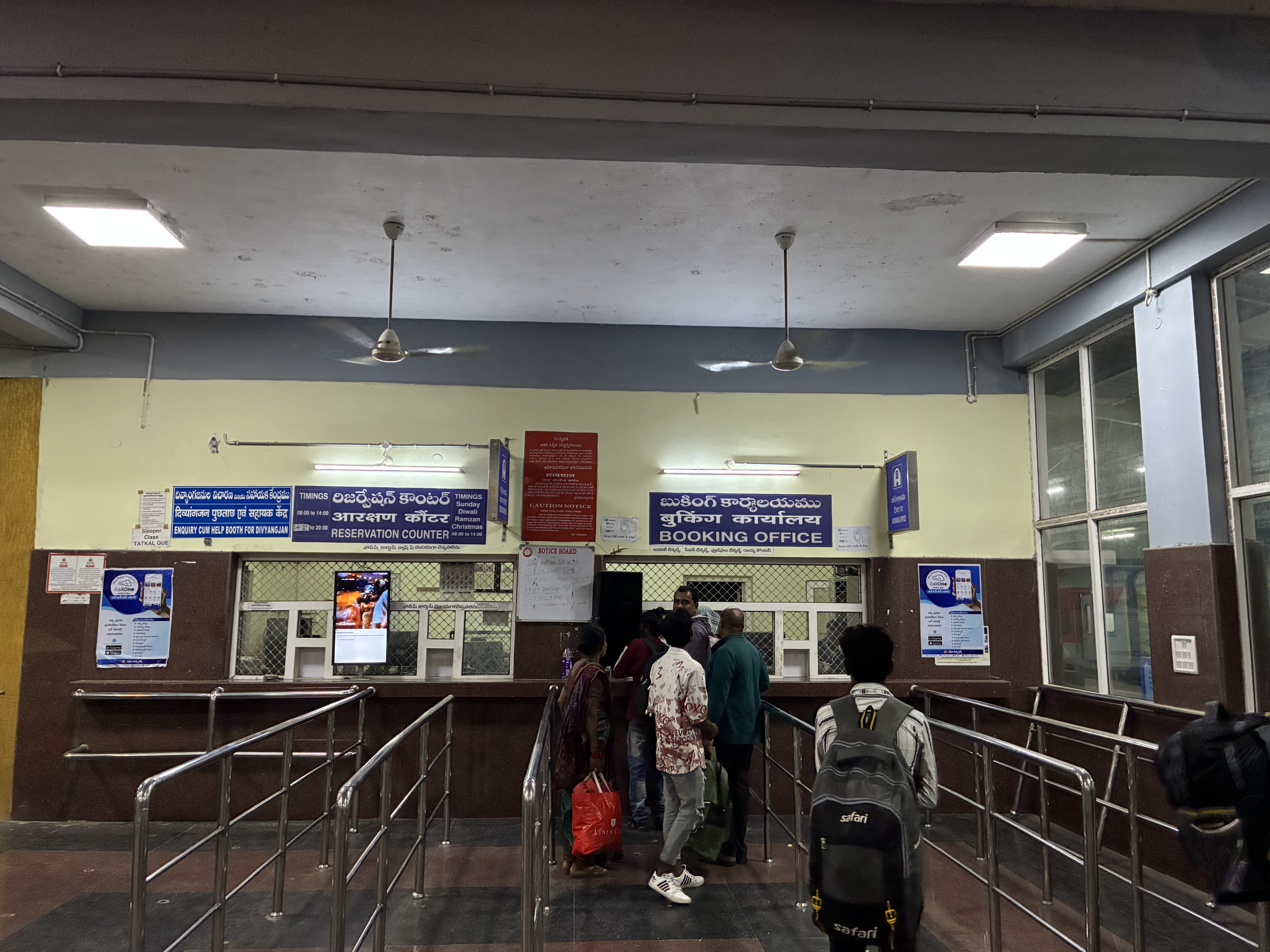
- Booking office and reservation counter at the new building of Machilipatnam railway station

General information
- Location: Machilipatnam, Krishna district., Andhra Pradesh; India
- Coordinates: 16°10′19″N 81°08′18″E
- Elevation: 14 m (46 ft)
- System: Indian Railways station
- Line: Gudivada–Machilipatnam branch line
- Platforms: 3
- Tracks: 5 ft 6 in (1,676 mm) broad gauge

Construction
- Structure type: Standard (on-ground station)
- Parking: Available

Other information
- Status: Functioning
- Station code: MTM
- Zone(s): South Coast Railway
- Division(s): Vijayawada

History
- Opened: 4 Feb, 1908

Services
Preceding station	Indian Railways	Following station
Chilakalapudi towards ?	Gudivada–Machilipatnam branch line	Terminus
Location
- Location within Andhra Pradesh Location within India
- Interactive map

Machilipatnam railway station (station code:MTM) located in the Indian state of Andhra Pradesh, serves Machilipatnam in Krishna district. It is administered under Vijayawada railway division of South Coast Railway zone. The Vijayawada–Machilipatnam line was scheduled to be doubled by 2016. Machilipatnam railway station is categorized as a Non-Suburban Grade-5 (NSG-5) station in the Vijayawada railway division.

== History ==
In 2012–13, a survey report was submitted for new Machilipatnam–Repalle railway line.

== Classification ==
In terms of earnings and outward passengers handled, Machilipatnam is categorized as a Non-Suburban Grade-5 (NSG-5) railway station. Based on the re–categorization of Indian Railway stations for the period of 2017–18 and 2022–23, an NSG–5 category station earns between ₹1–₹10 crore and handles 1–2 million passengers.

== Station amenities ==
It is one of the 38 stations in the division to be equipped with Automatic Ticket Vending Machines (ATVMs).

== Originating express trains ==
All trains originating from Machilipatnam must pass through Gudivada Jn.

Train no.	Train Name	Destination	Departure	Running	Route
17208	Sai nagar Shiridi Weekly Express	Sai nagar shiridi.	06:50	Tue	Gudivada Jn., Vijayawada Jn., Kazipet Jn., Charlapalli., Vikarabad Jn., Latur road Jn., Parbhani Jn., Aurangabad ., Nagarsol ., Manmad Jn
17211	Kondaveedu Express	Yesvantpur Jn.	15:55	Mon, Wed, Fri	Gudivada Jn., Vijayawada Jn., Guntur Jn., Nandyal Jn., Dhone, Dharmavaram Jn., Hindupur
17215	Machilipatnam-Dharmavaram Express	Dharmavaram.	19:50	All Days	Gudivada Jn., Vijayawada Jn., Guntur Jn., Nandyal Jn., Yerraguntla Jn., Gooty Fort., Anantapur.
12749	Machilipatnam-Bidar Super Fast Express	Bidar	20:50	All Days	Gudivada Jn., Vijayawada Jn., Kazipet Jn., Secunderabad Jn., Vikarabad Jn.
17219	Visakhapatnam Express	Visakhapatnam Jn.	21:25	All Days	Gudivada Jn., Bhimavaram Jn., Nidadavolu Jn., Rajahmundry, Tuni

Preceding station	Indian Railways	Following station
Chilakalapudi towards ?	Gudivada–Machilipatnam branch line	Terminus
