= Vijayawada Junction railway station =

Railway Station in Andhra Pradesh, India

Vijayawada Junction
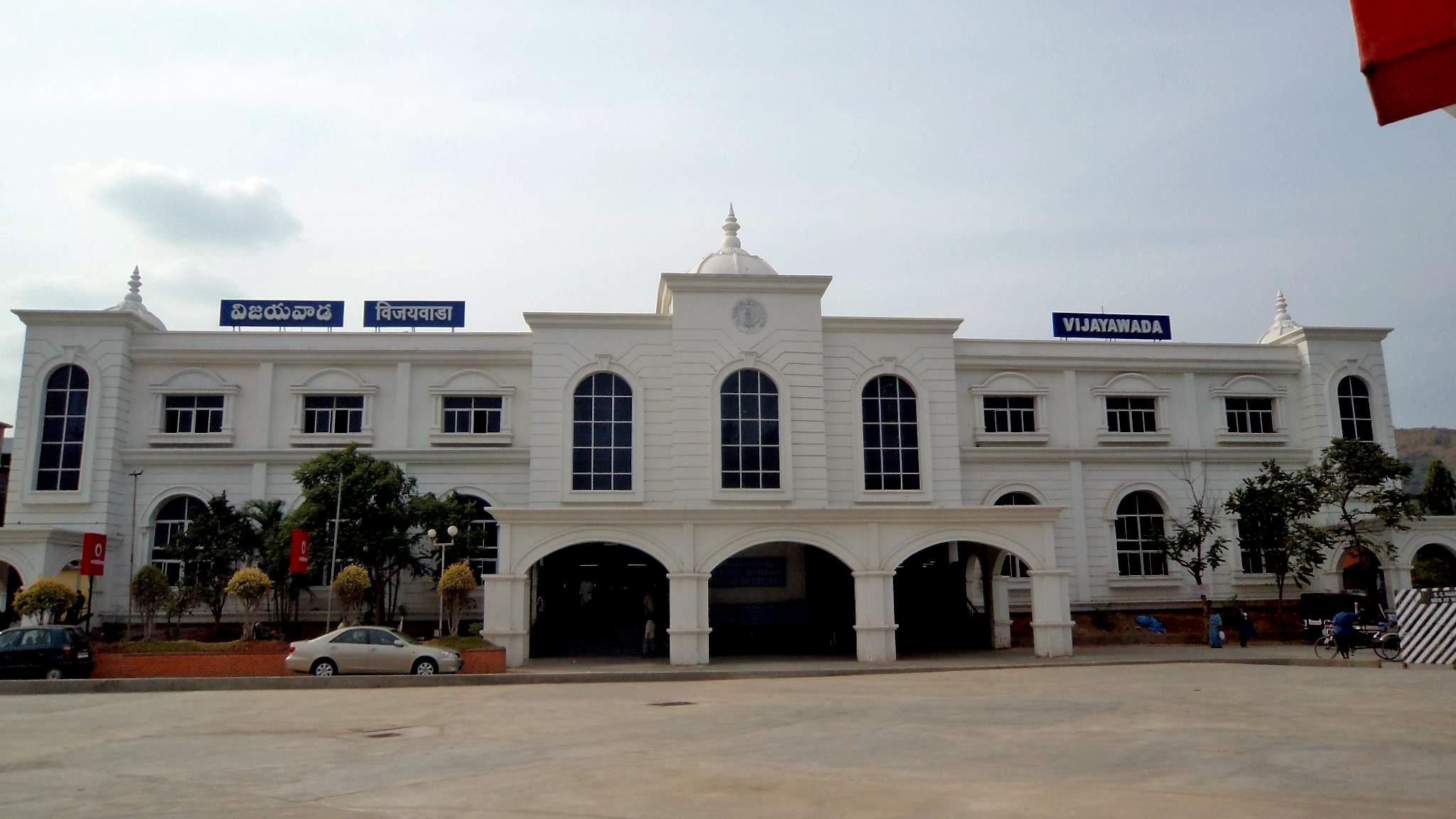
- Vijayawada railway station

General information
- Location: Railway Station Rd, Hanumanpet, Vijayawada, Andhra Pradesh; India
- Coordinates: 16.5184°N 80.6195°E
- Elevation: 19.354 metres (63.50 ft)
- System: Indian Railways station
- Owner: Indian Railways
- Operator: South Coast Railway zone
- Lines: Howrah–Chennai main line, New Delhi–Chennai main line, Vijayawada-Nidadavolu loop line
- Platforms: 10
- Tracks: 24
- Connections: Bus stand, Auto, Taxi stand

Construction
- Structure type: Standard (on-ground station)
- Parking: Yes
- Cycle facilities: Yes
- Accessible: Available

Other information
- Status: Active
- Station code: BZA
- Zone(s): South Coast Railway zone
- Division(s): Vijayawada

History
- Opened: 1888; 138 years ago

Passengers
- 51 millions approx.

Services
Preceding station	Indian Railways	Following station
Krishna Canal Junction towards ?	New Delhi–Chennai main line	Rayanapadu towards ?
Krishna Canal Junction towards ?	Howrah–Chennai main line	Gunadala towards ?
Terminus	Vijayawada–Nidadavolu loop line	Madhura Nagar towards ?
Location
- Location within Andhra Pradesh Location within India
- Interactive map

Vijayawada Junction Railway Station (station code:- BZA) is an Indian Railways station in Vijayawada of Andhra Pradesh, categorized as a Non-Suburban Grade-1 (NSG-1) station in Vijayawada railway division. Situated at the junction of Howrah–Chennai and New Delhi–Chennai main lines, it is the fourth busiest railway station in the country after Howrah Junction, Kanpur Central and New Delhi. The station serves about 1.40 lakh passengers, over 190 express and 170 freight trains every day. It is one of the major railway junctions of the Indian Railways and is a nationally important halt. In September, 2023 It has been awarded Platinum Rating Certificate for its Environmental projects from IGBC (Indian Green Building Council)

== History ==
The Vijayawada city junction railway station was constructed in 1888 when the Southern Maharatta Railway's main eastward route was connected with other lines going through Vijayawada. In 1889, the Nizam's Guaranteed State Railway constructed a line between Secunderabad railway station and Vijayawada as an extension railway for Bezawada; the station subsequently became a junction of three lines from different directions.

On 1 November 1899, the broad-gauge line was constructed between Vijayawada and Chennai, making rail journey between Chennai, Mumbai, Howrah, New Delhi and Hyderabad possible. In the following decades the Vijayawada railway station was developed into a junction until the nationalisation of all the independent railways in India occurred; following nationalisation, Indian Railways was formed under the Ministry of Railways in 1950 by the Government of India. The Vijayawada railway station, as the headquarters of Vijayawada Division, was assigned to the Southern Railway. In 1966, a new zone, South Central Railway, was formed, with Secunderabad as its headquarters; Vijayawada Division and Vijayawada Junction were merged with the new railway.

In 1969, the Golconda Express was introduced between Vijayawada and Secunderabad as the express steam-hauled train in the country, with an average speed of 58 km/h. As of 2012, the Vijayawada railway station is one of the busiest railway stations in India.

This is a new information.

== Layout and infrastructure ==
Vijayawada station has the standard station layout, and has 10 platforms. All the tracks in the station are broad gauge and electrified. Trains have perfect traction inside the station. The seventh platform of the station is the largest of all. Vijayawada station is a junction station for two main lines of Howrah–Chennai and New Delhi–Chennai main lines.

In the FY 2009, the Indian Railways Company board allocated ₹3.5 crore (US$360,000) for improvements to the transport hub. A central aspect of the improvements was an "Integrated Security Scheme" which included construction of a compound wall around the station premises and a reduction in the number of entrances as a precaution against terrorism. SCR recently installed Automatic Ticket Vending Machines (ATVM)s at Vijayawada Junction. Recently the engineering department officials have completed a circuit lighting area near the station main entrance. A 490 metre long and 20 feet wide foot over bridge is constructed connecting platforms 1 to 10 which will help passengers to walk less. Cost of project is estimated to be 2 crores.

The Vijayawada Junction also houses a Diesel Loco Shed which has the WDM-2 Locomotive and DEMU Shed with 2 Pit lines which have a 10, 9 DEMU Coaches Capacity also BZA have an Electric Loco Shed, Vijayawada which has the WAG-7, WAM-4(now scrapped or withdrawn), WAG-5 WAP-4WAP-7 locos.

The Vijayawada station was now arranged with a new Route Relay Interlocking system which returns the fast and punctual movement of trains into the city junction.

Vijayawada Coaching Depot has 5 pit lines for primary maintenance of trains originating from here.

== Diesel Loco Shed, Vijayawada ==
Serial No.	Locomotive Class	Horsepower	Quantity
1.	WDM-3D	3300	4
2.	WDG-4/4D	4000/4500	23
3.	WAG-9	6120	26
Total Locomotives Active as of June 2025			53

== Satellite stations ==
The Rayanapadu railway station has been developed by the Indian Railways to act as a satellite station to the Vijayawada Railway Station, in order to reduce the congestion on the former.

The Gunadala railway station is being developed as part of the Amrit Bharat Station Scheme, which aims to transform Gunadala into a satellite station to reduce congestion at Vijayawada Junction.

== Performance and earnings ==
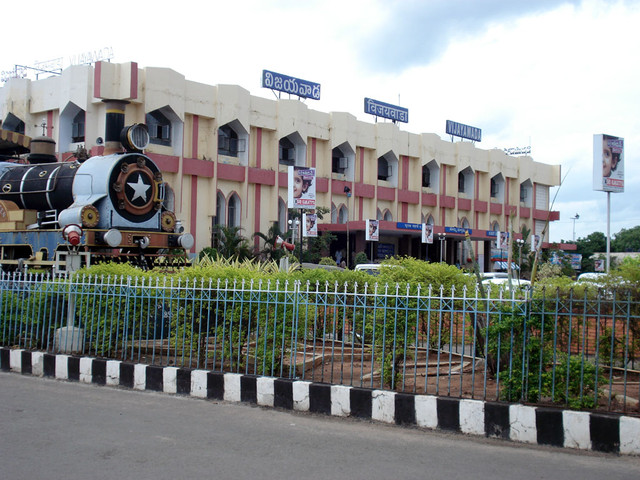
Vijayawada railway station – old facade

An average of 1.40 lakh passengers are served per day and 50 million annually. More than 250 passenger trains and 150 goods trains utilize the station daily, with each train stopping for at least 15 to 20 minutes.

No. of platforms		10
Trains	Passenger	258
Trains	Freight	150
Passengers	Per day	1.40 lakh
Passengers	Annual	50 million

== See also ==
- List of railway stations in India
