= Gudivada–Machilipatnam branch line =

Railway line in India

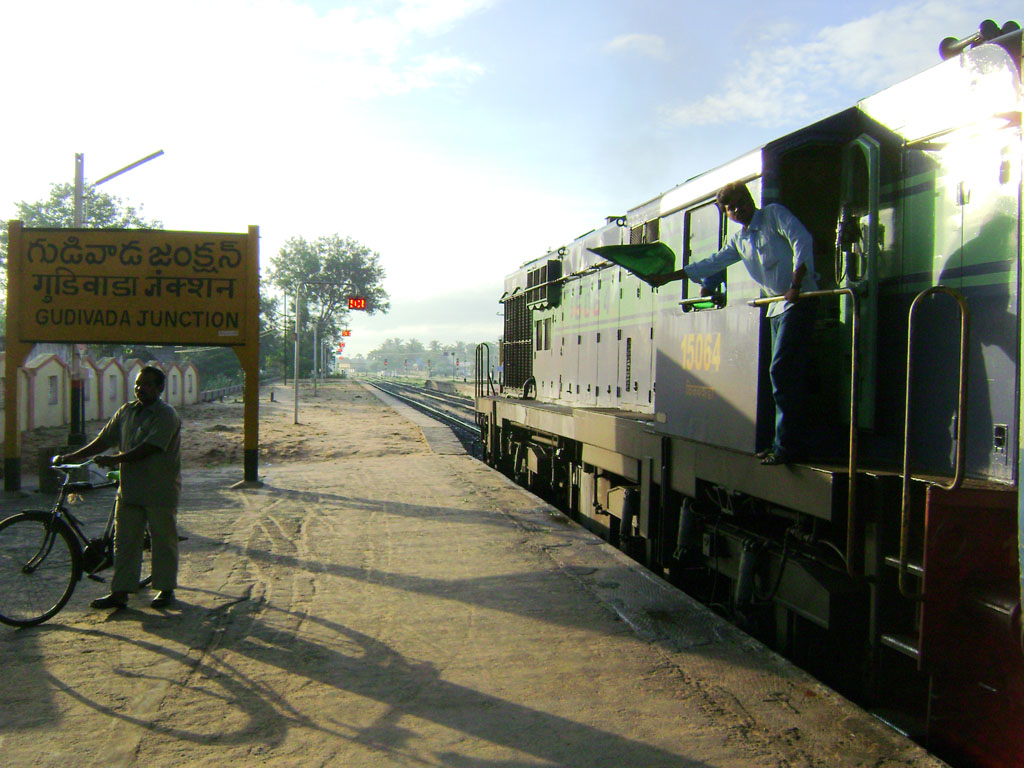
- Machilipatnam Express leaves Gudivada Junction to enter Gudivada–Machilipatnam branch line

Overview
- Status: Operational
- Owner: Indian Railways
- Locale: Andhra Pradesh
- Termini: Gudivada; Machilipatnam

Service
- Operator: South Coast Railway

Technical
- Line length: 36.70 km (22.80 mi)
- Track gauge: 5 ft 6 in (1,676 mm)
- Electrification: 25 kV AC overhead catenary
- Operating speed: 100 km/h (62 mph)

The Gudivada–Machilipatnam branch line is a railway line connecting Gudivada and Machilipatnam in the Krishna district of the Indian state of Andhra Pradesh. The section intersects the Vijayawada–Nidadavolu loop line at Gudivada.

== Jurisdiction ==
This branch line is under the administrative jurisdiction of Vijayawada railway division of South Coast Railway zone and has a length of 36.70 km (22.80 mi).
