= Vijayawada–Nidadavolu loop line =

Railway line in India

Vijayawada–Nidadavolu Branch line
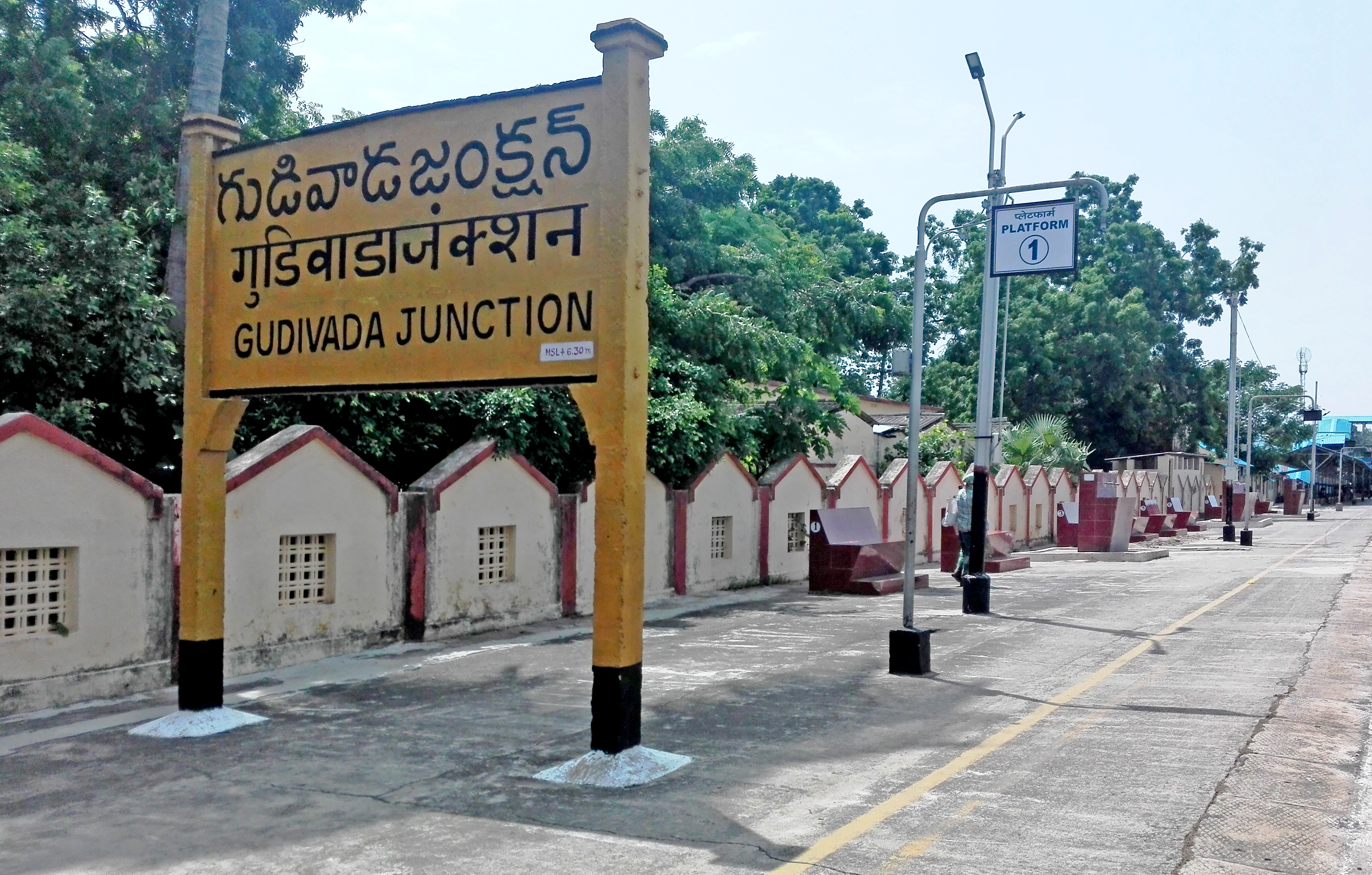
- Gudivada Junction a railway station lies on Vijayawada–Nidadavolu loop line

Overview
- Status: Operational
- Owner: Indian Railways
- Locale: Andhra Pradesh
- Termini: Vijayawada; Nidadavolu

Service
- Operator: South Coast Railway

Technical
- Line length: 127 km (79 mi)
- Track gauge: 5 ft 6 in (1,676 mm) broad gauge
- Electrification: Yes
- Operating speed: 130 km/h (81 mph)

The Vijayawada–Nidadavolu loop line is a loop of Vijayawada–Gudivada–Bhimavaram Town–Nidadavolu railway stations. Both Vijayawada and Nidadavolu stations lie on Howrah–Chennai main line. It is under the administrative jurisdiction of Vijayawada railway division of South Coast Railway zone.
