= List of villages in West Godavari district =

This is an alphabetical list of villages in undivided West Godavari district prior to 4 June 2022, Andhra Pradesh, India. For current list of existing articles, see Category:Villages in West Godavari district

== A ==
- Achanta
- Achanta Vemavaram
- Agadallanka
- Agarru
- Ajjamuru
- Akividu
- Akkireddigudem
- Allipalle
- Amberpeta
- Amrutalingampeta
- Amudalachalaka
- Anakoderu
- Ananthapalli
- Annavaram
- Aravalli
- Arjunudupalam
- Attili

== B ==
- Badampudi
- Ballipadu
- Ballipadu
- Ballipadu
- Bethapudi
- Bhimadole
- Bhimalapuram
- Bhogole
- Bodapadu
- Brahmanagudem
- Burugagudem
- Buttayagudem

== C ==
- Chagallu
- Chakrayagudem
- Challachintalapudi
- Challapalle
- Chataparru
- Chebrolu
- Cherukumilli
- Chettunnapadu
- Chidipi
- Chinakapavaram
- Chinamiram
- Chintalapudi
- Chintampalle
- Chintaparru
- Chinthapally
- Chodavaram

== D–E ==
- Daravaram
- Denduluru
- Devarapalle
- Devulapalle
- Dharmajigudem
- Dharmapuram
- Dharmavaram
- Digamarru
- Dirusumarru
- Doddipatla
- Dommeru
- Dondapadu
- Dorasanipadu
- Dosapadu
- Duddepudi
- Dumpagadapa
- Duvva
- Edulakunta
- Eduru
- Eletipadu
- Elurupadu
- Endapalli
- Epuru

== G–J ==
- Galayagudem
- Ganapavaram
- Garagaparru
- Garlamadugu
- Gogunta
- Gopalapuram
- Gopannapalem
- Goraganamudi
- Gudigunta
- Gudivakalanka
- Gummampadu
- Gummuluru
- Gundugolanu
- Gunnampalli
- Guntupalle
- Iragavaram
- Jagannadhapuram
- Jeelakarra Gudem
- Jeelugumilli

== K ==
- Kaikaram
- Kalakurru
- Kalaparru
- Kalavalapalli
- Kaldhari
- Kalipatnam
- Kalla
- Kamavarapukota
- Kanchumarru
- Kandaravalli
- Kantamanenivari Gudem
- Karugorumilli
- Kasipadu
- Kavuluru
- Kesavaram
- Khandavalli
- Kodamanchili
- Koderu
- Kodurupadu
- Kokkirailanka
- Kokkirapadu
- Kollaparru
- Kolleru
- Komarada
- Komatilanka
- Komirepalle
- Kommara
- Kommugudem
- Kondalaraopalem
- Konijerla
- Koniki
- Konithiwada
- Koppaka
- Korumilli
- Kothagudem
- Kothapalle
- Kothota
- Kothuru
- Kovvada
- Kovvali
- Koyyalagudem
- Kukkunoor
- Kumaradevam
- Kumudavalli
- Kuppanapudi
- Kurukuru

== L–M ==
- Lakshminarayanapuram
- Lankalakoderu
- Lingapalem
- Madhavaram, Kukkunoor
- Madhavaram, Tadepalligudem
- Madivada
- Makkinavarigudem
- Malakacherla
- Malavanitippa
- Mallavaram
- Manchili
- Manuru
- Markundapadu
- Marteru
- Matsyapuri
- Medinaraopalem
- MM Puram
- Mogallu
- Mogalthur
- Mortha
- Mukkamala
- Mundur
- Mupparru
- Muppavaram

== N ==
- Nabipeta
- Nadipudi
- Naguladevunipadu
- Nallajerla
- Nandikeswarapuram
- Narasimhapuram
- Navuduru
- Nidamarru

== P ==
- Palakoderu
- Pali
- Pallantlai
- Paluru
- Pangidigudem
- Pattiseema
- Pekeru
- Pedakadimi
- Pedakapavaram
- Pedamallam
- Pedapadu
- Pedapulleru
- Pedavegi
- Pennada Agraharam
- Pentapadu
- Penumanchili
- Penumantra
- Peravali
- Pinakadimi
- Pippara
- Poduru
- Polamuru
- Polasanipalle
- Polavaram
- Ponangi
- Pothavaram
- Pothunuru
- Pragadavaram
- Prakasaraopalem
- Prathikollanka
- Pulla
- Pydichintapadu

== R–S ==
- Rajampalem
- Rajupeta
- Rajupothepalle
- Ramaraogudem
- Ramasingavaram
- Rangapuram Khandrika
- Ravipadu
- Rayakuduru
- Rayannapalem
- Relangi
- Saanigudem
- Sakalakothapalle
- Saripalle
- Satyavolu
- Siddapuram
- Singarajupalem
- Singavaram
- Skinnerapuram
- Somavarappadu
- Sreeparru
- Sriramavaram
- Surappagudem

== T–U ==
- T. Narasapuram
- Tadepalle
- Tadikalapudi
- Tadiparru
- Tallagudem
- Tallamudi
- Tallapudi
- Taratava
- Thimmannagudem
- Thogummi
- Tirupatipuram
- Undi
- Undrajavaram
- Unguturu
- Unikili
- Uppugudem
- Usulumarru

== V–Y ==
- Vadali
- Valluru
- Vanguru
- Varighedu
- Vatluru
- Veeravasaram
- Vegavaram
- Vegivadavaram
- Velagadurru
- Velagalapalli
- Vellamilli
- Velerupadu
- Velivennu
- Velpuru
- Vempa
- Vempadu
- Vijayarai
- Yadavilli
- Yelamanchili
- Yendagandi
- Yernagudem
- Yerraicheruvu
- Yerramalla
