= Yadavilli =

Yadavilli may refer to:

== Places ==
- Yadavilli, Eluru district, Andhra Pradesh, India
- Yadavilli, Kurnool district, Andhra Pradesh, India
- Yadavally, Nalgonda district, Telangana, India

== People ==
- Yadavilli (name), a surname and given name
