= Nabipeta =

Nabipeta (Nabipet) is a small village in East Godavari district (Nallajerla Mandal), Andhra Pradesh, India. The native language of Nabipeta is Telugu.

The surrounding nearby villages and its distance from Nabipeta are Anantapalli 3.8 km, Nallajerla 7.6 km, Prakasaraopalem 11.7 km, Singarajupalem 17.2 km, Pullalapadu 23.8 km. The nearest towns from Nabipeta are Eluru - 52.5 km, Tadepalligudem – 28.7 km, Rajahmundry – 48.5 km.

The nearest famous temples are Dwaraka Tirumala (Chinna Tirupathi) - 32 km, Bhimavaram Mavullamma temple - 59.3 km, Vijaywada Durga temple - 111.6 km, Annavaram Satyanarayana Swamy temple - 123.4 km.

The other surrounding state capitals are below Chennai 450.1 km, Pondicherry 587.3 km, Bhubaneswar 590.9 km
