= T. Narasapuram mandal =

T. Narasapuram Mandal
- Mandal
- Interactive Map Outlining mandal
- Location in Andhra Pradesh, India
- Coordinates: 17°06′13″N 81°04′41″E
- state: India
- State: Andhra Pradesh
- District: Eluru
- Headquarters: T.Narasapuram

Government
  - Body: Mandal Parishad

Area
  - Total: 281.14 km^{2} (108.55 sq mi)

Population (2011)
  - Total: 56,179
  - Density: 199.83/km^{2} (517.55/sq mi)

Languages
  - Official: Telugu
- Time zone: UTC+5:30 (IST)
- Vehicle registration: AP 37

T. Narasapuram Mandal is one of the 28 mandals in Eluru district of the Indian state of Andhra Pradesh. The headquarters are located in T. Narasapuram town. The mandal is bordered by Jangareddygudem Mandal and Jeelugumilli to the north, Kamavarapukota Mandal to the east, Chintalapudi Mandal to the south and Khammam district to the west.

== Demographics ==
According to the 2011 Census of India, the mandal reported a population of 56,179 in 15,293 households. The total population consists of 28,523 males and 27,656 females with a gender ratio of 970 females per 1000 males. 5,906 children are in the age group of 0–6 years, of which 2,975 are boys and 2,931 are girls, with a gender ratio of 985. The average literacy rate stands at 61.7% with 31,012 literates, of which 16,792 are males and 14,220 are females.

The majority of the population, 17,204 people, identify as a Scheduled Caste (SC), whereas there are 5,079 people in a Scheduled Tribe (ST).

=== Work ===
According to the report published by the Census of India in 2011, 31,871 people were engaged in work activities out of the total population of T. Narasapuram Mandal, which includes 22,108 males and 9,314 females.

According to the 2011 Census of India, 30,457 workers describe their job as a main source of income; 4,040 workers are cultivators, 23,725 work as agricultural laborers, 310 are working in the household industry, and 2,382 are involved in other professions. Of these statistics, 1,414 people are marginal workers.

== Administration ==
T. Narasapuram Mandal is administrated by Polavaram (ST) (Assembly constituency) of Eluru (Lok Sabha constituency) and by one of the twelve mandals that fall under Eluru revenue division.

== Towns and villages ==
As of 2011, the census recorded 22 settlements. Out of all of the villages, T. Narasapuram is the largest, while the smallest is Krishnaraopalem in terms of population.

The settlements in the mandal are listed below:

1. Allamcherlarajupalem
2. Bandamcherla
3. Bandivarigudem
4. Borrampalem
5. Epigunta
6. Gudlapalle
7. Guravaigudem
8. Kethavaram
9. Kollivarigudem
10. Krishnapuram
11. Krishnaraopalem
12. Lingaraopalem
13. Makkinavarigudem
14. Rajupothepalle
15. Ramannapalem
16. Sriramavaram
17. T.narasapuram
18. Tedlam
19. Tirumaladevipeta
20. Vallampatla
21. Velagapadu

== Education ==
The mandal plays a major role in education for rural students. The primary and secondary school education is imparted by government aid, while private schools are facilitated by the School Education Department of the state. As per the school information report for 2015–16, the mandal has more than 6,161 students enrolled in over 76 schools.

== See also ==
- List of mandals in Andhra Pradesh
- Eluru
