= Kondapaturu =

Coordinates: 16°01′N 80°24′E

Kondapaturu Kondapturu
- village
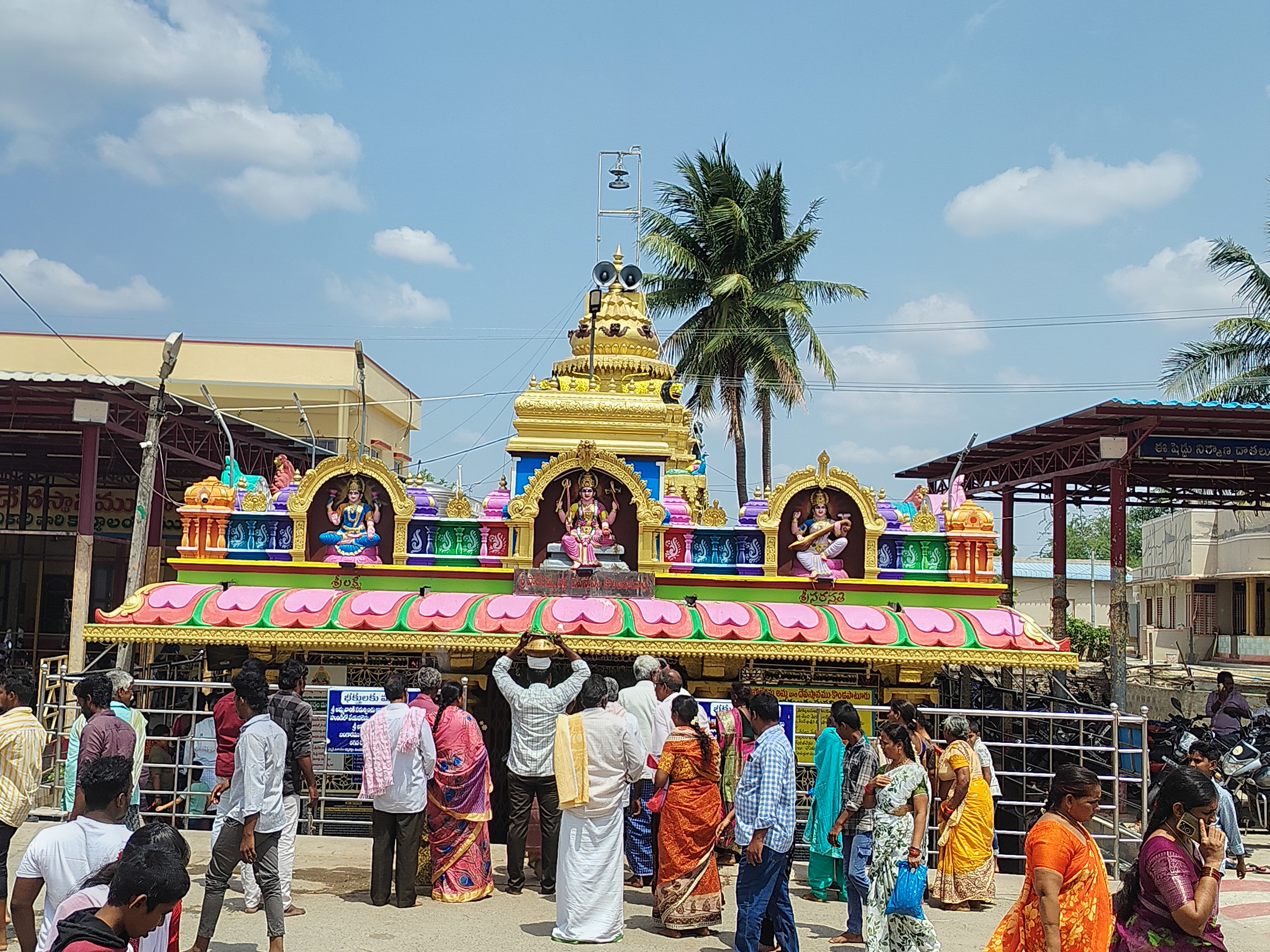
- Poleramma temple
- Interactive map of Kondapaturu
- Location in Andhra Pradesh, India
- Country: India
- State: Andhra Pradesh
- District: Guntur

Government
  - Type: Democratic
  - Body: President:

Population
  - Total: Approx-(7,500)

Languages
  - Official: Telugu
- Time zone: UTC+5:30 (IST)
- PIN: 522112

Kondapaturu is a village in Kakumanu Mandal in the Guntur district of Andhra Pradesh, India. It is located 35 km (22 miles) south of the main district of Guntur, 3 km (1.9 miles) from Kakumanu, and 296 km (184 miles) from Hyderabad, the state capital. Between March and April, Thirunalla ("A Festival for goddess Poleramma ") is celebrated by 200,000 to 300,000 visiting worshippers every year. According to tradition of Bhavanarayana temple situated in Bapatla The Consort of the lord Bhavanarayana Belongs to Kondapaturu village.to signify this fact from over 1490 years traditional Puttinti sare sent to Lord Bhavanarayana during his annual Kalyanostavam.

According to a census in 2011, the local language of Kondapaturu is Telugu. Kondapatur village's population is 3,020, which comprises 895 households, with a female population of 51.1%. The literacy rate of the village is around 63.6% (29.2% among females).

== Location ==
Kondapaturu's postal code is 522112 and the postal head office is in Kakumanu.

Appapuram (4 km), Garlapadu (5 km), Peddivaripalem (5km), Returu (5km), Kommuru (6 km) are the neighboring villages of Kondapaturu. Kondapaturu borders Pedanandipadu Mandal to the north, Parchur Mandal to the west, Bapatla Mandal to the south, and Ponnur Mandal to the east.

Bapatla, Ponnur, Chirala, and Chilakaluripet are the nearest cities to Kondapaturu.

The village borders Guntur district and Prakasam District. Prakasam District Parchur is to the west of the village.

== Transport ==
Bapatla is the nearest town, 24 km (15 miles) from Kondapaturu. Kondapaturu is accessible by road from Bapatla.

There is no railway station within a 10 km (6.2 miles) radius of Kondapaturu. The nearest train station to the village is in Bapatla.

Several bus stations serve the village; for example, Guntur APSRTC Bus Station, Bapatla APSRTC Bus Station, Ponnur APSRTC Bus Station. APSRTC runs many buses from major cities here.
