= Jeelakarra Gudem =

Jeelakarragudem, Guntupalli
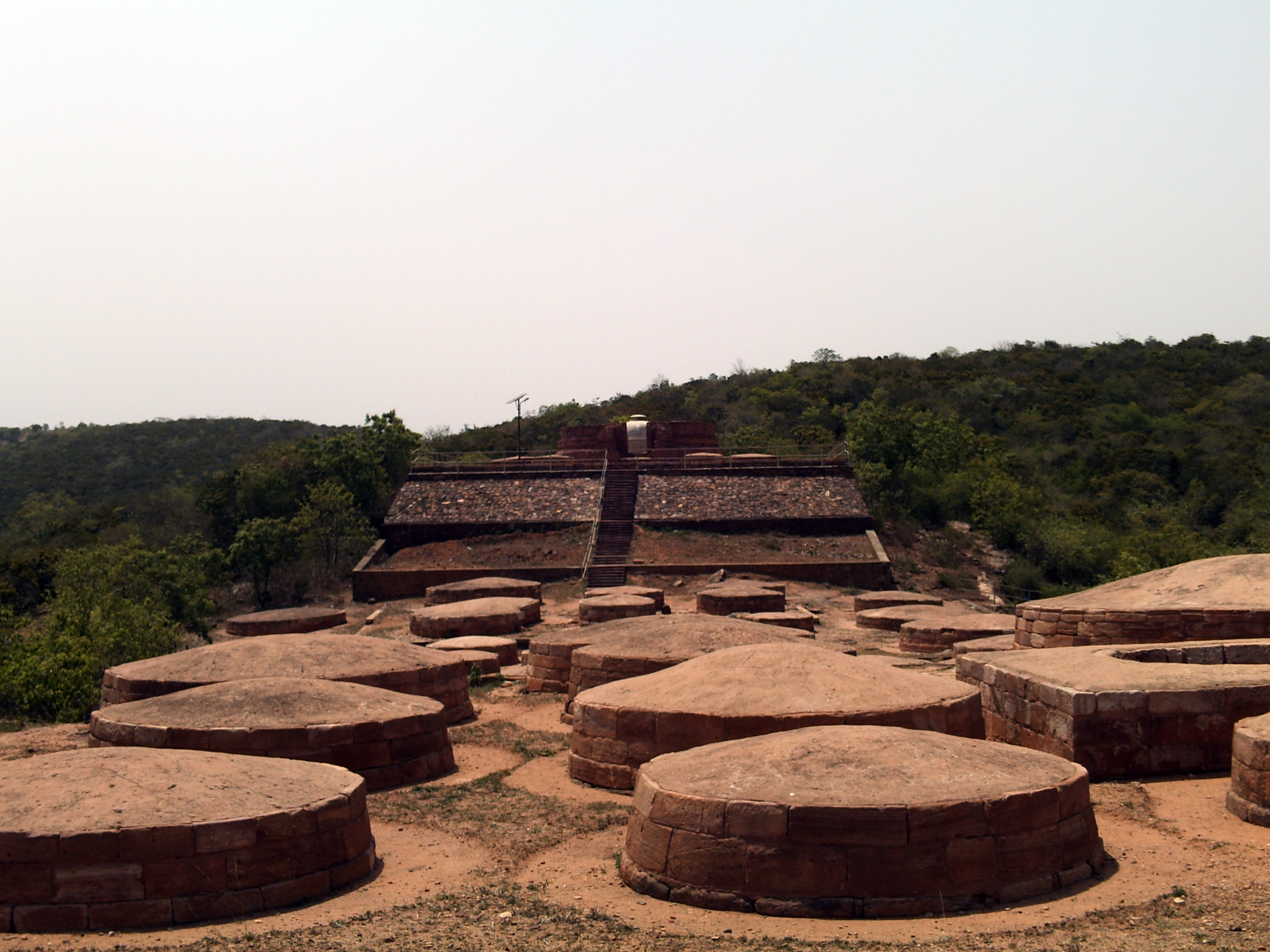
- Interactive map of Jeelakarragudem, Guntupalli
- Location in Andhra Pradesh, India
- Coordinates: 17.0126352°N 81.12810020000006°E
- Country: India
- State: Andhra Pradesh
- District: Eluru

Languages
  - Official: Telugu
- Time zone: UTC+5:30 (IST)
- PIN: 534467
- Telephone code: +91–8829
- Vehicle registration: AP

Jeelakarragudem is a village of Guntupalle village district, situated at a distance of 6.4-km from Kamavarapukota. The village is situated picturesquely amidst hills and contains the famous Buddhist Monuments, Guntupalle.
