= Chintalapudi mandal =

- Mandal
- Interactive map of Chintalapudi mandal
- Location in Andhra Pradesh, India
- Coordinates: 17.06°N 80.98°E
- Country: India
- State: Andhra Pradesh
- District: Eluru

Population (2011)
  - Total: 91,372

Languages
  - Official: Telugu
- Time zone: UTC+5:30 (IST)

Chintalapudi mandal is one of the 28 mandals in Eluru district of the Indian state of Andhra Pradesh. It is administered under Nuzvidu revenue division and its headquarters are located at Chintalapudi. The mandal is bounded by T.Narasapuram mandal, Lingapalem mandal, Khammam district

== Towns and villages ==
As of 2011 census, the mandal has 35 settlements. Chintalapudi is the most populated and Gonnepalle is the least populated village in the mandal.

The settlements in the mandal are listed below:

1. Allipalle
2. Amudalachalaka
3. Chintalapudi
4. Chintampalle
5. Endapalli
6. Erraguntapalle
7. Errampalle
8. Ganijerla
9. Gonnepalle
10. Gurubhatlagudem
11. Kantampalem
12. Kanupade
13. Lakshminarasimhapuram
14. Lingagudem
15. Maddimethinagudem
16. Mallayagudem
17. Namavaram
18. Pattayagudem
19. Ponukumadu
20. Pothunuru
21. Pragadavaram
22. Raghavapuram
23. Rangapuram Khandrika
24. Recharla
25. Sammetavarigudem
26. Sankuchakrapuram
27. Seethanagaram
28. Settivarigudem
29. Talarlapalle
30. Teegalavancha
31. Timmareddipalle
32. Urlagudem
33. Utasamudram
34. Venkammapalem
35. Venkatadrigudem
36. Venkatapuram

== See also ==
- Eluru district
