= Ballipadu =

Ballipadu may refer to any of the following places in Andhra Pradesh, India:

- Ballipadu, Palakol
- Ballipadu, Tallapudi
