= Vempadu =

Vempadu may refer to:

- Vempadu, Anakapalli district
- Vempadu, Eluru district
- Vempadu, West Godavari district
