= Pothavaram =

- Village
- Interactive map of Pothavaram
- Location in Andhra Pradesh, India Pothavaram (India)
- Coordinates: 17.019405°N 81.412805°E
- Country: India
- State: Andhra Pradesh
- District: East Godavari district
- Mandal: Nallajerla

Government
  - Type: State Government TDP, JSP, BJP (Telugu Desam Party, Janasena Party, Bharatiya Janata Party in coalition)

Languages
  - Official: Telugu
- Time zone: UTC+5:30 (IST)
- PIN: 534176

Pothavaram is a village in Nallajerla Mandal, East Godavari district in Andhra Pradesh, India. Tadepalligudem is around 30 km from here. The nearest railway station is Badampudi(BPY) located at a distance of 21.01 km.

== Demographics ==
As of 2011 Census of India, Pothavaram had a population of 10130. The total population constitute, 5151 males and 4979 females with a sex ratio of 967 females per 1000 males. 1071 children are in the age group of 0–6 years, with sex ratio of 944 The average literacy rate stands at 73.66%.
