= Polamuru =

Palamuru may refer to:

- Polamuru, East Godavari, a village in East Godavari district, Andhra Pradesh, India
- Polamuru, West Godavari, a village in West Godavari district, Andhra Pradesh, India
