= Velagalapalli =

- village
- Interactive map of Velagalapalli
- Location in Andhra Pradesh, India Velagalapalli (India)
- Coordinates: 17.0107869°N 80.9909319°E
- Country: India
- State: Andhra Pradesh
- District: Eluru
- Elevation: 21 m (69 ft)

Population (2011)
  - Total: 1,500

Languages
  - Official: Telugu
- Time zone: UTC+5:30 (IST)
- PIN: 534461
- Telephone code: 08823
- Vehicle registration: AP

Velagalapalli is a village located in Chintalapudi Mandal of West Godavari District in the state of Andhra Pradesh, India.

== Geography ==
Velagalapalli is located at 17.0107869°N 80.9909319°E. It is elevation 21 meters above sea level. Velagalapalli has a vast area of forest land, which starts from the Velgalapalli outcuts and stretches to Lingapalem Mandal. In Velagalapalli forest have a holy hill called Pothuraju Hill, also known as ‘’’Pothuraju Gattu’’’(పోతురాజు గట్టు). Lord Pothuraju situated on this hill. Guardian Lord Pothuraju is an Avatar of lord Vishnu.

Pragadavaram (2 km), Errampally (4 km), Chintalapudi (7 km), Lingapalem (6 km), Fathimapuram (1 km) are the nearby villages to Velagalapalli. Eluru, Tadepalligudem, Jangareddygudem, and Nuzvid are the nearby cities to Velagalapalli.

Velagalapalli is surrounded by Lingapalem Mandal towards South, Chatrai Mandal towards west, T.Narasapuram Mandal towards East. Velagalapalli is on the border of the West Godavari District and Krishna District. Krishna District Chatrai is west towards the village.

== Economy ==
Velagalapalli people are mainly dependent on agriculture. Mainly rice, cotton, tobacco, chilly, corn fields, turmeric. Agriculture is the main occupation of people living in Velagalapalli. some of the crops grown in this region include paddy, vegetables, groundnut, mango, lime, etc., Other occupation in Velagalapalli includes the priests, carpenters, blacksmiths, barbers, weavers, potters, oil pressers, leatherworkers, sweepers, water bearers and many others.

== Governance ==
Civic administration

Velagalapalli comes under Pragadavaram Gram panchayat.

Politics

Velagalapalli is a part of Chintalapudi Assembly constituency for Andhra Pradesh Legislative Assembly. It is also a part of Eluru (Lok Sabha constituency)

== Transport ==
Velagalapalli is easily accessed by road from Chintalapudi and Eluru. APSRTC is running buses from Chintalapudi and Eluru to Velagalapalli. The nearest railway station to Velagalapalli is Eluru and the nearest airports are Vijayawada airport. Rajahmundry Airport, Alluri Sitarama Raju International Airport, Rajiv Gandhi International Airport - Hyderabad.

== Neighborhood picnic and tourist places ==
Neighborhood picnic and tourist places of this village are NagireddyGudem Water Dam(Tammileru) Appx.5 km far from village, Guntupalli Caves Buddhist Caves, Dwaraka Tirumala Temple, Kolleru Lake 15 km from Eluru, Papi Hills near Polavaram, Polavaram Project, Pattiseema.

== Temples and churches ==
Velagalapalli has following temples and churches:

- Lord Sri Seeta Rama Temple also called Ramalayam
- Hanuman temple also called Bhakta Anjaneya Swami Temple
- Nagedhra Swami Temple
- Our Lady of Fathima Church Fathimapuram Parish (Latin). It was established in 1958.

== Education ==
- MPP Schools: In Mandal Parishad Primary School, till 5th standard education available. It is established in 1990.
- RCM Primary School: Education available till 5th standard.
- Private School: St. Antony Primary and High School.

== Culture and traditions ==
The lifestyle of the village has a mixture of both urban and rural elements. Velagalapalli residents wear both Indian style and Western-style clothing. The most common traditional clothing for women is a Saree and Dhoti for men.

== Services ==
- Medical Service: 1) Fathima Hospital 2) Homeopathy Clinic and 3) Private Clinic
- Postal Service: Sub-Post Office (PIN Code: 534461)
- Drinking Water: DW supplying by Grama Panchayat. Also has a mineral water plant running by villagers.
- Banks : Andhra Bank branch office (IFSC Code:ANDB0000413) available in Pragadavaram, two km from Velagalapalli.
- Petrol bunk: Available
- Public Library: Available
- Print media : Eenadu, Sakshi etc., daily newspapers available.
- Electronic Media: 100+ TV channels are available through cable connection. It Includes Telugu, Hindi and English TV channels.
