= Prakasam =

Prakasam may refer to:

== Concept ==
- Prakāśa, concept in Indian philosophy, meaning "light"

== Individuals ==
- A. S. Prakasam, Indian film director, screenwriter, and playwright
- D. M. Prakasam (born 1957), fourth bishop of the Roman Catholic Diocese of Nellore
- Jameela Prakasam (born 1957), Indian politician
- L. Prakasam (died 1998), Indian pastor
- Tanguturi Prakasam (1872-1957), Indian anti-colonial activist and politician

== Locations ==
- Prakasam Barrage, named after Tanguturi Prakasam
- Prakasam district, named after Tanguturi Prakasam
- Prakasam Stadium, named after Tanguturi Prakasam

== Other uses ==
- Prakasha, village in Maharashtra, India
- Prakasarao, Indian male given name
