= Bhogole =

Bhogole may refer to:

- Bhogole, West Godavari district, a village in West Godavari district, Andhra Pradesh, India
- Bogole, Nellore district, a village in Nellore district, Andhra Pradesh, India
- Bhogole, Prakasam district, a village in Prakasam district, Andhra Pradesh, India
