= Makkinavarigudem =

- village
- Interactive map of Makkinavarigudem
- Location in Andhra Pradesh, India Makkinavarigudem (India)
- Coordinates: 17°06′13″N 81°04′41″E
- Country: India
- State: Andhra Pradesh
- District: Eluru

Population
  - Total: 4,502

Languages
  - Official: Telugu
- Time zone: UTC+5:30 (IST)
- PIN: 534456
- Telephone code: 08823

Makkinavarigudem is a village of T. Narasapuram mandal in Eluru district in the state of Andhra Pradesh, India.

== Demographics ==
As of 2011 Census of India, Makkinavarigudem had a population of 4735. The total population constitute, 2373 males and 2362 females with a sex ratio of 995 females per 1000 males. 449 children are in the age group of 0–6 years, with sex ratio of 952. The average literacy rate stands at 66.54%.
