= Pennada Agraharam =

Pennada
- neighbourhood
- Interactive map of Pennada
- Location in Andhra Pradesh, India
- Coordinates: 16.5443°N 81.5844°E
- Country: India
- State: Andhra Pradesh
- District: West Godavari
- Mandal: Palacoderu
- Time zone: UTC+05:30 (IST)

Pennada Agraharam is a village is located on National Highway 214 between Bhimavaram and Palakollu. Pin Code - 534243

== Demographics ==
As of 2011 Census of India, Pennada Agraharam had a population of 5603. The total population constitute, 2809 males and 2794 females with a sex ratio of 995 females per 1000 males. 534 children are in the age group of 0–6 years, with sex ratio of 861 The average literacy rate stands at 81.30%.
