= Prakasarao =

Prakasarao or Prakasa Rao (ప్రకాశరావు) is a masculine name commonly used in India.

- B. L. S. Prakasa Rao
- K. S. Prakash Rao
- Prakashrao Abitkar

Few habitats named after it:

- Prakasaraopalem
- Prakashraopeta
