= Kumudavalli =

- Neighbourhood
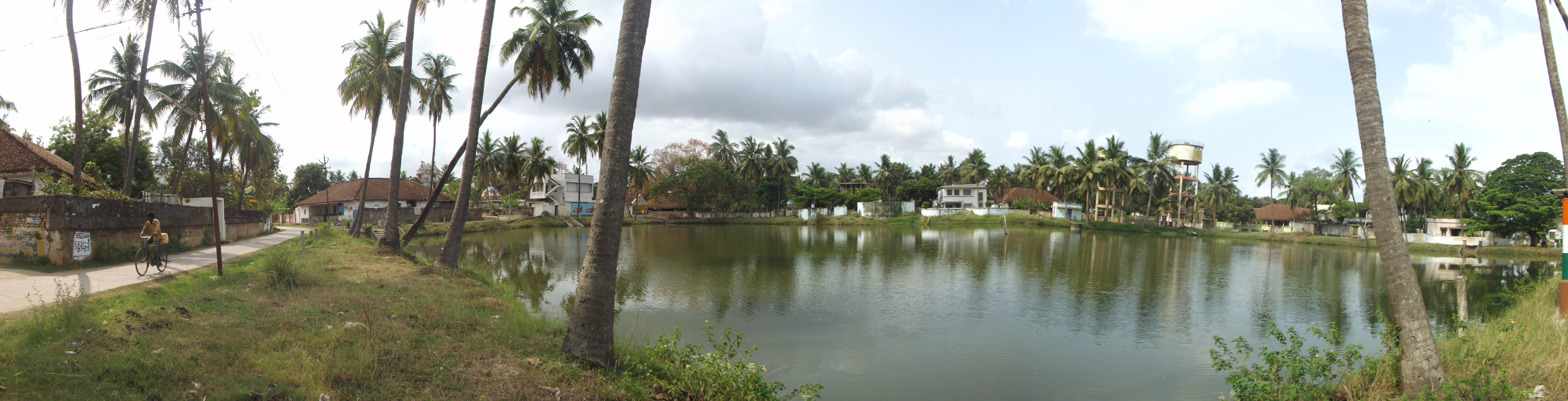
- Kumudavalli Village
- Interactive map of Kumudavalli
- Location in Andhra Pradesh, India
- Country: India
- State: Andhra Pradesh
- District: West Godavari
- Talukas: Palakoderu

Population (2001)
  - Total: 4,123

Languages
  - Official: Telugu
- Time zone: UTC+5:30 (IST)
- PIN: 534210
- Telephone code: 08816

Kumudavalli is a Gram panchayat in Palakoderu mandal situated about 1 km away from Bhimavaram City of West Godavari District, Andhra Pradesh, India. Kumudavalli Gram Panchayat is one of the four ISO 9001:2008 certified villages in India. The nearest railway station is at Bhimavaram Junction located at a distance of 3.04 km from Kumudavalli.

== Demographics ==
According to Indian census, 2001, the demographic details of Kumudavalli village is as follows:

- Total Population: 4,123 in 1,186 Households
- Male Population: 2,072 and Female Population: 2,051
- Children Under 6-years of age: 596 (Boys - 332 and Girls - 264
- Total Literates: 2,409
