= Kantamanenivari Gudem =

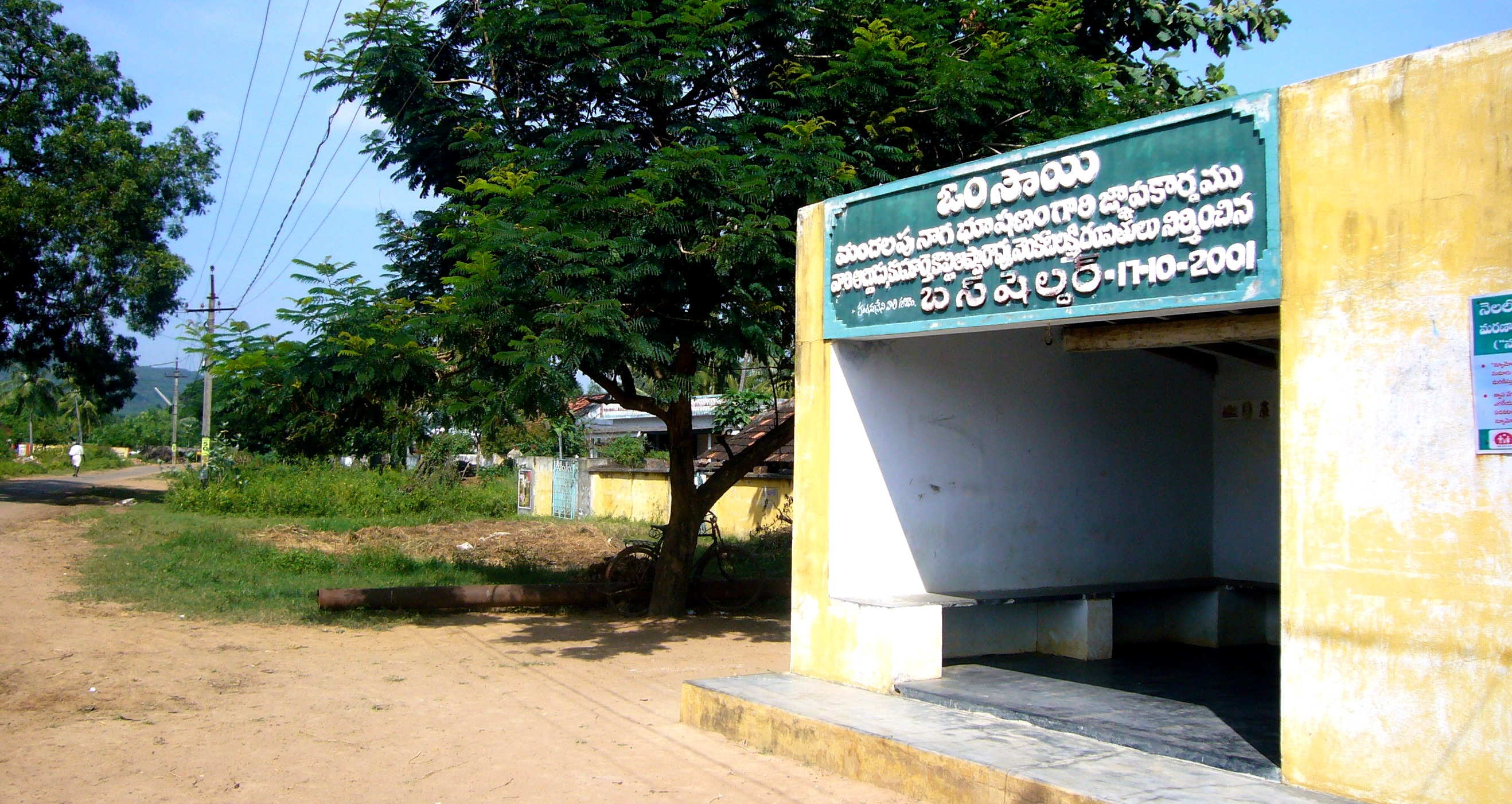
Bus shelter in Kantamanenivari Gudem, 2007

Kantamanenivari Gudem is a small village situated in Guntupalli Panchayat of Kamavarapukota mandal of Eluru district.
