= Kavuluru, Nallajerla mandal =

Kavuluru
- Village
- Interactive map of Kavuluru
- Location in Andhra Pradesh, India
- Coordinates: 16.59413°N 81.24423°E
- Country: India
- State: Andhra Pradesh
- Region: East Godavari
- District: East Godavari
- Mandal: Nallajerla

Languages
  - Official: Telugu
- Time zone: UTC+5:30 (IST)
- PIN: 534176
- Telephone code: 08818
- ISO 3166 code: IN-AP
- Vehicle registration: AP 37

Kavuluru is a village in the Nallajerla Mandal, East Godavari district of Andhra Pradesh in India.
