= Yadavilli, Kurnool district =

Coordinates: 15.6329°N 77.1299°E

Yadavilli
- village
- Interactive map of Yadavilli
- Country: India
- State: Andhra Pradesh

Languages
  - Official: Telugu
- Time zone: UTC+5:30 (IST)

Ya-da-villi village is located in Kurnool district of Andhra Pradesh.

== See also ==
- Yadavilli, Eluru district
