= Daravaram =

Coordinates: 16°56′N 81°41′E

- village
- Interactive map of Daravaram
- Country: India
- State: Andhra Pradesh
- District: East Godavari

Government
  - Body: Daravaram

Population
  - Total: 2,410

Languages
  - Official: Telugu
- Time zone: UTC+5:30 (IST)
- PIN: 534302
- Telephone code: 08813
- Nearest city: Nidadavole
- Lok Sabha constituency: Rajahmundry
- Vidhan Sabha constituency: Kovvur
- Civic agency: Daravaram

Daravaram is a village in Chagallu mandal, East Godavari district in Andhra Pradesh state in India.

== Geography ==
Daravaram is a village in Chagallu mandalam, East Godavari district, Andhra Pradesh, India. The village came into East Godavari district after the redrawing of district borders by Jagan Mohan Reddy government.

== Demographics ==
As of 2011 Census of India, Daravaram had a population of 2514. The total population constitute, 1250 males and 1264 females with a sex ratio of 1011 females per 1000 males. 262 children are in the age group of 0–6 years, with sex ratio of 1031. The average literacy rate stands at 69.76%.
