= Guntupalle, Eluru district =

Guntupalle
- Village
- Interactive map of Guntupalle
- Location in Andhra Pradesh, India
- Coordinates: 17.00150°N 81.08214°E
- Country: India
- State: Andhra Pradesh
- District: Eluru

Area
  - Total: 1.06 km^{2} (0.41 sq mi)
- Elevation: 16 m (52 ft)

Population (2011)
  - Total: 4,113
  - Density: 3,880/km^{2} (10,000/sq mi)

Languages
  - Official: Telugu
- Time zone: UTC+05:30 (IST)
- Postal code: 534 475

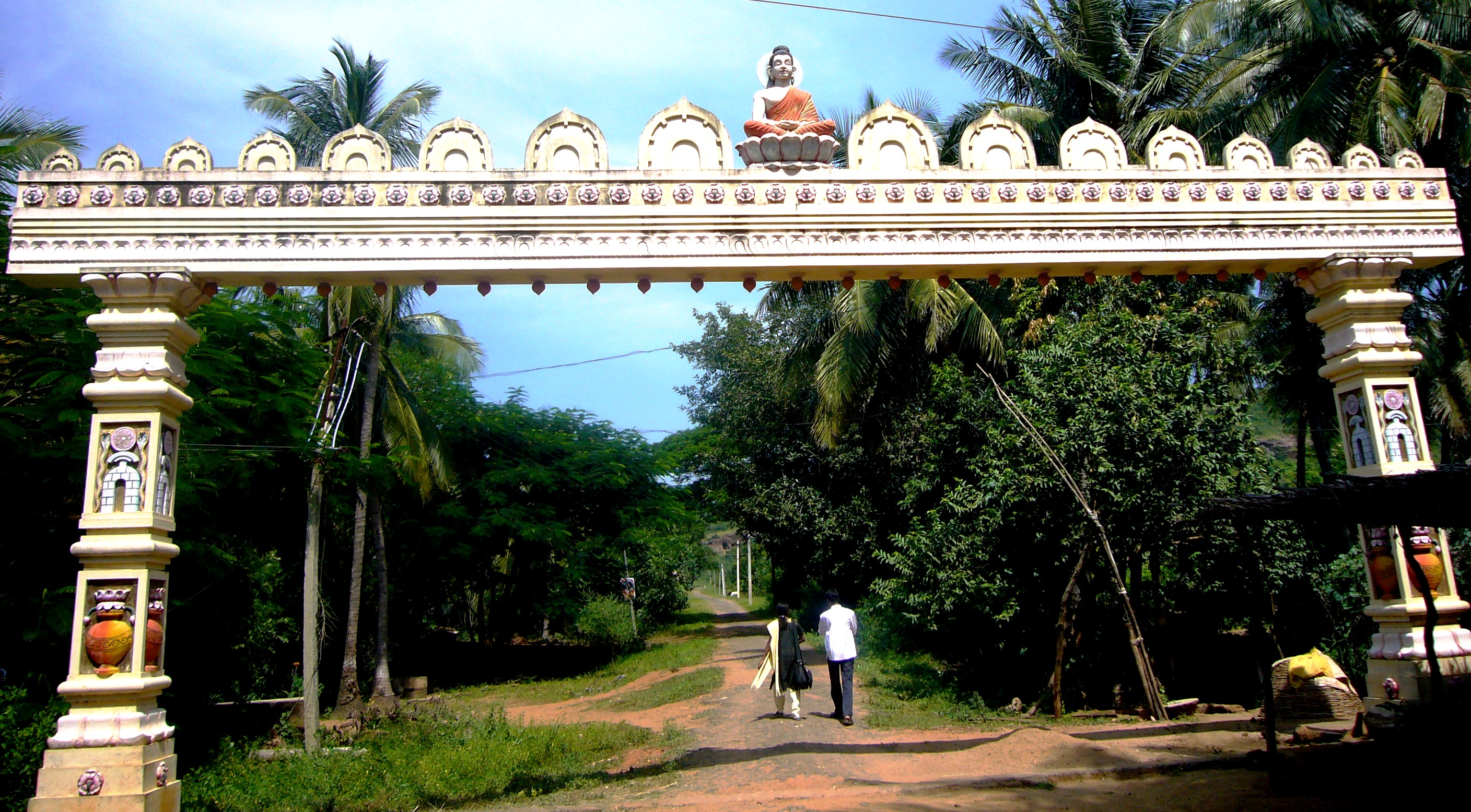
Guntupalli Village

Guntupalle is a village in Eluru District of the Indian state of Andhra Pradesh. It is located in Kamavarapukota mandal of Eluru revenue division. It is located at a distance of 42 km from district headquarters Eluru city. It is well known tourist destination famously known for Guntupalli caves. The nearest train station is Eluru railway station.

== Demographics ==
As of 2011 Census of India, Guntupalle had a population of 4113. The total population constitutes 2086 males and 2027 females, a sex ratio of 972 females per 1000 males. 395 children are in the age group of 0–6 years, a child sex ratio of 946 girls per 1000 boys. The average literacy rate stands at 70.06%.
