= Rayannapalem =

Coordinates: 16°50′N 81°03′E

- Village
- Interactive map of Rayannapalem
- Location in Andhra Pradesh, India Rayannapalem (India)
- Country: India
- State: Andhra Pradesh
- District: Eluru

Population (2011)
  - Total: 4,758

Languages
  - Official: Telugu
- Time zone: UTC+05:30 (IST)
- Postal code: 534403

Rayannapalem is a village in Eluru district of the Indian state of Andhra Pradesh. It is located in Pedavegi mandal of Eluru revenue division, about 11 miles from Eluru. The nearest railway station is POWERPET railway station and ELURU railway station located at a distance of more than 10 Km.

== Demographics ==
As of 2011 census of India, Rayannapalem has a population of 4,758 of which 2,382 are males and 2,376 are females.
