= Yelamanchili, West Godavari district =

Yalamanchili
- Village
- Interactive map of Yalamanchili
- Location in Andhra Pradesh, India Yalamanchili (India)
- Coordinates: 16°28′48″N 81°46′51.6″E
- Country: India
- State: Andhra Pradesh
- District: West Godavari
- Mandal: Yalamanchili

Population (2011)
  - Total: 8,984

Languages
  - Official: Telugu
- Time zone: UTC+5:30 (IST)
- PIN: 534268
- Nearest city: Palakollu

Yalamanchili is a village and mandal headquarters of Yalamanchili mandal in West Godavari district of the Indian state of Andhra Pradesh.

== Geography ==
Yalamanchili is located on Eastern coastal plains in Coastal Andhra region.
