= Vadali, West Godavari district =

Vadali is a village in Penugonda Mandal in West Godavari District of the Indian state of Andhra Pradesh.

== Demographics ==
Telugu is the local language. The population of Vadali is 5,613, with 2,825 males and 2,788 females living in 1451 Households.
