= Kolleru, West Godavari =

Kolleru
- village
- Interactive map of Kolleru
- Location of Achanta mandal in Andhra Pradesh, India Kolleru (India)
- Coordinates: 16.625610°N 81.351268°E
- Country: India
- State: Andhra Pradesh
- District: West Godavari
- Mandal: Akividu

Population (2011)
  - Total: 154

Languages
  - Official: Telugu
- Time zone: UTC+5:30 (IST)
- PIN: 534 235
- Telephone code: 08812

Kolleru is a village in West Godavari district in the state of Andhra Pradesh in India.

== Demographics ==
As of 2011 India census, Kolleru has a population of 154 of which 76 are males while 78 are females. The average sex ratio of Kolleru village is 1026. The child population is 14, which makes up 9.09% of the total population of the village, with sex ratio 890, significantly higher than state average. In 2011, the literacy rate of Kolleru village was 52.14% when compared to 67.02% of Andhra Pradesh.

== See also ==
- West Godavari district
