= Konithiwada =

- village
- Interactive map of Konithiwada
- Location in Andhra Pradesh, India
- Country: India
- State: Andhra Pradesh
- District: West Godavari

Population (2011)
  - Total: 8,537

Languages
  - Official: Telugu
- Time zone: UTC+5:30 (IST)
- Postal code: 534240

Konithiwada is a village in the Veeravasaram Mandal in West Godavari District of Andhra Pradesh state, India. Aravalli Rail Way Station and Viravasaram Rail Way Station are the nearest train stations.

== Demographics ==
As of 2011 Census of India, Konithiwada had a population of 9999. The total population constitutes 4281 males and 4256 females with a sex ratio of 994 females per 1000 males. 706 children are in the age group of 0–6 years, with sex ratio of 893. The average literacy rate stands at 77.14%. devi v prasad varma
