= Mortha =

- village
- Interactive map of Mortha
- Location in Andhra Pradesh, India Mortha (India)
- Coordinates: 16.809358°N 81.7016476°E
- Country: India
- State: Andhra Pradesh
- District: East Godavari

Government
  - Type: Panchayati raj (India)
  - Body: Gram panchayat
- Elevation: 13 m (43 ft)

Population (2001)
  - Total: 8,000 approximately

Languages
  - Official: Telugu
- Time zone: UTC+5:30 (IST)
- PIN: 534227
- Telephone code: 08819

Mortha is a village in East Godavari district of Andhra Pradesh, India. There is a lot of history involved with this village. One of them is Kukkamondem (Dogs trunk).

== Geography ==
Mortha is located at 16°80′N 81°70′E. It has an average elevation of 13 meters (42 feet). The village is just 5 km away from the river Godavari.

== Demographics ==
As of 2011 Census of India, Mortha had a population of 6,663. The total population constitute, 3,285 males and 3,378 females with a sex ratio of 1028 females per 1000 males. 640 children are in the age group of 0–6 years, with sex ratio of 839. The average literacy rate stands at 72.22%.
