= Kamavarapukota mandal =

Kamavarapukota Mandal
- Mandal
- Interactive map of Kamavarapukota Mandal
- Country: India
- State: Andhra Pradesh
- District: Eluru

Population (2011)
  - Total: 53,592

Languages
  - Official: Telugu
- Time zone: UTC+5:30 (IST)
- PIN: 5344**
- Vehicle registration: AP37
- Nearest city: Eluru
- Climate: hot (Köppen)

Kamavarapukota is a mandal in Eluru district in the state of Andhra Pradesh in India.

== Demographics ==
According to Indian census, total population of Kamavarapukota Mandal is 53,592 living in 13,205 Houses, it has 41 villages and 14 panchayats. Of which Males are 27,107 and Females are 26,485.

== Towns and villages ==
As of 2011 census, the mandal has 15 villages. The settlements in the mandal are listed below:

- Ankalampadu
- Edavalli
- Guntupalle
- Kallacheruvu
- Kamavarapukota
- Khandrika Seetharamavaram
- Kondagudem
- Mankenapalle
- Polasigudem
- Rajunagulapalle
- Ramannapalem
- Ravikampadu
- Tadikalapudi
- Uppalapadu
- Vadlapatlanuthanam
