= Mukkamala, Peravali mandal =

Mukkamala
- Village
- Interactive map of Mukkamala
- Location in Andhra Pradesh, India
- Coordinates: 16°44′47″N 81°46′19″E
- Country: India
- State: Andhra Pradesh
- District: East Godavari

Population (2011)
  - Total: 5,128

Languages
  - Official: Telugu
- Time zone: UTC+5:30 (IST)
- PIN: 534330
- Telephone code: 08819
- Vehicle registration: AP 37

Mukkamala is a village in Peravali mandal of East Godavari district, Andhra Pradesh, India.

== Demographics ==
As of 2011 Census of India, Mukkamala had a population of 5128. The total population constitute, 2599 males and 2529 females with a sex ratio of 973 females per 1000 males. 463 children are in the age group of 0–6 years, with sex ratio of 1067. The average literacy rate stands at 72.33%.
