= Dharmajigudem =

- Village
- Interactive map of Dharmajigudem
- Location in Andhra Pradesh, India
- Coordinates: 16.54°N 81.00°E
- Country: India
- State: Andhra Pradesh
- District: Eluru

Population (2011)
  - Total: 8,564

Languages
  - Official: Telugu
- Time zone: UTC+5:30 (IST)
- PIN: 534462
- Vehicle registration: AP

Dharmajigudem is a village and a major panchayat in the district of Eluru district, Andhra Pradesh, India.

== Demographics ==
As of 2011 Census of India, Dharmajigudem had a population of 8564. The total population constitute, 4287 males and 4277 females with a sex ratio of 998 females per 1000 males. 814 children are in the age group of 0–6 years, with sex ratio of 911. The average literacy rate stands at 76.15%.
