= Tallapudi mandal =

Coordinates: 17.124°N 81.665°E

- Mandal
- Interactive Map Outlining mandal
- Location in Andhra Pradesh, India
- Country: India
- State: Andhra Pradesh
- District: East Godavari

Languages
  - Official: Telugu
- Time zone: UTC+5:30 (IST)

Tallapudi mandal is one of the 19 mandals in the East Godavari district of the Indian state of Andhra Pradesh. It is administered under the Kovvur revenue division.
