= Tadepalli, West Godavari district =

Tadepalli Pedatadepalli
- Village
- Interactive map of Tadepalli
- Location in Andhra Pradesh, India Tadepalli (India)
- Coordinates: 16.8473°N 81.4884°E
- Country: India
- State: Andhra Pradesh
- District: West Godavari
- Mandal: Tadepalligudem
- Talukas: Tadepalligudem

Languages
  - Official: Telugu
- Time zone: UTC+5:30 (IST)

Tadepalli is a village in Tadepalligudem mandal, West Godavari district of the state of Andhra Pradesh in southern India.

== Demographics ==
As of 2011 Census of India, Tadepalli had a population of 11081. The total population constitute, 5801 males and 5208 females with a sex ratio of 910 females per 1000 males. 1004 children are in the age group of 0–6 years, with sex ratio of 927 The average literacy rate stands at 76.29%.
