= Anakoderu =

- village
- Interactive map of Anakoderu
- Location of Bhimavaram mandal in Andhra Pradesh, India Anakoderu (India)
- Coordinates: 16.737951°N 81.620946°E
- Country: India
- State: Andhra Pradesh
- District: West Godavari
- Mandal: Bhimavaram

Population (2011)
  - Total: 5,697

Languages
  - Official: Telugu
- Time zone: UTC+5:30 (IST)
- PIN: 534 208
- Telephone code: 08812

Anakoderu is a village in West Godavari district in the state of Andhra Pradesh in India. Bhimavaram town and junction stations are the nearest railway stations.

== Demographics ==
As of 2011 India census, Anakoderu has a population of 5697 of which 2877 are males while 2820 are females. The average sex ratio of Anakoderu village is 980. The child population is 571, which makes up 10.02% of the total population of the village, with sex ratio 1025. In 2011, the literacy rate of Anakoderu village was 72.20% when compared to 67.02% of Andhra Pradesh.

== See also ==
- Eluru
