= Kommuru =

- Village
- Interactive map of Kommuru
- Location in Andhra Pradesh, India
- Country: India
- State: Andhra Pradesh
- District: Eluru
- Mandal: Agariripalli

Languages
  - Official: Telugu
- Time zone: UTC+5:30 (IST)

Kommuru (historically known as Rajagopalapuram) is a small village in Aagiripalli mandal, Eluru district, Andhra Pradesh, India. It was once a part of the Nuzvidu taluka but is now administered as part of Aagiripalli mandal. Formerly part of the Suravaram panchayat, it now has its own panchayat named Kommuru panchayat.

== Economy ==
Mango cultivation is the mainstay of the local economy.

16.652931°N 80.876528°E
