= Malavanitippa =

Malavanitippa మాలవానితిప్ప
- Village
- Location in Andhra Pradesh, India
- Coordinates: 16.455163°N 81.424808°E
- Country: India
- State: Andhra Pradesh
- District: West Godavari
- Mandal: Kalla

Government
  - Type: Gram Panchayat
  - Body: Malavanitippa Panchayat
  - Sarpanch: Sagiraju Subbaraju
  - MLA: Raghu Rama Krishna Raju
  - MP: Bhupathi Raju Srinivasa Varma

Area
  - Total: 1.41 km^{2} (0.54 sq mi)
- Elevation: 10 m (33 ft)

Population (2011)
  - Total: 1,291

Languages
  - Official: Telugu
- Time zone: UTC+5:30 (IST)
- PIN: 534236
- Telephone code: +91-8816
- Vehicle registration: AP 37

Malavanitippa (మాలవానితిప్ప), is a small village in the West Godavari district of the Indian state of Andhra Pradesh. As of the 2011 India census, this panchayat had a population of 1291: males constitute 52% of the population and females 48%, while 8% of the total population was under 6 years of age.

== Geography and climate ==
Malavanitippa located at latitude 16.45 and longitude 81.42 and at an elevation of 10 meters above the sea level. The topography of Malavanitippa is flat. This village is situated at the tail-end point of one of the canals originating from the west side of the Dowleswaram Barrage. Malavanitippa shares its border with Anandapuram, Iskulanka, and, S. C. Bose colony (military colony) villages. The general soil type is black soil.

The climate in this village is mainly tropical evergreen and moist deciduous type with moderate to high levels of humidity. Annual temperatures range between 19 and 41 °C (66 and 105 °F). From June through September, the southwest monsoon brings in heavy rains, although considerable rain also falls during the northeast monsoon (from mid-October to mid-December). During the winter (November to February), the village receives light rain with a pleasant atmosphere. Generally the winter temperatures are lies between 19 °C and 28 °C. The summer season in this village generally extends from March to June. The summer temperatures are extremely high due to high moisture levels. The temperature generally ranges between 29 °C and 41 °C.

== Economy ==
Aquaculture is the major economic source of Malavanitippa. Good access of both the fresh water from the river canal and backwaters from the sea facilitated farming large varieties of Fish and Shrimp in this village. The most commonly cultivated fish varieties in this region are Rohu, Catla, Pangasius, etc. On the other hand, cultivation of Asian tiger shrimp (Penaeus monodon), vannamei (Whiteleg shrimp) and Scampi varieties also played a major role in boosting the economy of this region.

== Religion and culture ==
Most of the people in Malavanitippa mainly practices Hinduism and the next dominant religion is Christianity. This is reflected as both temples of goddess Paralamma (పర్లమ్మ తల్లి) and Lord Sri Sitarama Swamy along with two churches are situated in the middle of the village. The villagers hold festivals such as the Dussehra celebrations at Paralamma temple, which involves Durga Puja, Theppotsavam; other festivals like Ganesh Chaturthi, Diwali are also celebrated every year. Villagers also celebrate the Makar Sankranti festival with union of families, friends, relatives followed by traditional activities. Especially, a cockfight during the Sankranthi festival is the biggest attraction of the village; people come from nearby villages and towns to witness the rooster fight.

The clothing includes traditional men wearing a Dhoti/Lungi and women wearing a Sari and Shalwar kameez. Western clothing is also predominant in the village.

== Transport ==
=== Road ===
Malavanitippa is well connected by road from the Bhimavaram-Juvvalapalem road via Jakkaram or Pallipalem. Most convenient road way to reach Malavanitippa is from Bhimavaram via Jakkaram village and the distance is 20 km. Andhra Pradesh State Road Transport Corporation (APSRTC) operates daily bus service from the Bhimavaram bus station on specific timings. A number of Auto rickshaws run frequently throughout the day from Bhimavaram old bus station.

=== Rail ===
The nearest railway station is the Bhimavaram Town railway station (station code: BVRT), 19 km from the Malavanitippa village, and takes approximately 40 minutes to travel.

=== Air ===
Vijayawada Airport is the nearest domestic airport, situated on Chennai - Kolkata National Highway 5 about 93 km from Malavanitippa. Rajahmundry Airport is another easily accessible domestic airport (107 km Approx).

=== Water ===
Until the mid-90s, the Mogadindi drain Waterway was the only route for the transportation of civilians and goods to Malavanitippa from Bhimavaram by Launch (boat). After the improvement of roads, this waterway remains unutilized.

== Civic administration ==
Malavanitippa Gram panchayat is the civic governing body of the village. It serves as a major panchayat with 8 wards, including the nearby Gogutippa village, and comes under the Undi constituency, currently represented by MLA Raghu Rama Krishna Raju. Over the years, villagers unanimously select the Sarpanch without going for elections, which shows the friendly relationship among the villagers. The present Sarpanch of the Malavanitippa panchayat is Sagiraju Subbaraju.

== See also ==
- Undi (Assembly constituency)
- Narasapuram (Lok Sabha constituency)
