= Chidipi =

- village
- Interactive map of Chidipi
- Location in Andhra Pradesh, India Chidipi (India)
- Coordinates: 17°05′34″N 81°40′55″E
- Country: India
- State: Andhra Pradesh
- District: East Godavari
- Elevation: 25 m (82 ft)

Population (2001)
  - Total: 1,481

Languages
  - Official: Telugu
- Time zone: UTC+5:30 (IST)
- PIN: 534350
- Telephone code: 91 8813

Chidipi is a village and a panchayat in Kovvur Mandal, East Godavari district of Andhra Pradesh State, India. The nearest railway station is located at Kovvur at a distance of more than 10 km from Chidipi.

== Geography ==
Chidipi is located at 17.03335°N 81.70525°E.[1] It has an average elevation of 25 metres (82 feet). The Godavari river is nearby.

== Demographics ==
As of 2011 Census of India, Chidipi had a population of 1584. The total population constitute, 793 males and 791 females with a sex ratio of 997 females per 1000 males. 169 children are in the age group of 0–6 years, with sex ratio of 837. The average literacy rate stands at 81.48%.
