= Pedapulleru =

Village in Andhra Pradesh, India

Coordinates: 16°34′00″N 81°27′00″E

Pedapulleru is a village in West Godavari district, Andhra Pradesh, India, dependent on rice production.

== Demographics ==
As of 2011 Census of India, Pedapulleru had a population of 2919. The total population constitute, 1437 males and 1482 females with a sex ratio of 1031 females per 1000 males. 245 children are in the age group of 0–6 years, with sex ratio of 1025 The average literacy rate stands at 67.24%.
