= Nallajerla mandal =

- Mandal
- Interactive Map Outlining mandal
- Location in Andhra Pradesh, India
- Country: India
- State: Andhra Pradesh
- District: East Godavari

Area
  - Total: 245.93 km^{2} (94.95 sq mi)

Population (2011)
  - Total: 80,388
  - Density: 326.87/km^{2} (846.60/sq mi)

Languages
  - Official: Telugu
- Time zone: UTC+5:30 (IST)

Nallajerla mandal is one of the 19 mandals in East Godavari district of the Indian state of Andhra Pradesh having population of 80,388 as of 2011 census. It is administered under Kovvur revenue division and its headquarters are located at Nallajerla.

== Towns and villages ==
As of 2011 census, the mandal has 12 settlements. Nallajerla is the most populated and Chodavaram is the least populated village in the mandal.

The settlements in the mandal are listed below:

1. Achannapalem
2. Ananthapalle
3. Anumunilanka
4. Avapadu
5. Cheepurugudem
6. Chodavaram
7. Dubacherla
8. Gundepalle @ Chodavaram
9. Kavuluru
10. Marellamudi
11. Nallajerla
12. Pothavaram
13. Prakasaraopalem
14. Singarajupalem
15. Telikicherla

== See also ==
- East Godavari district
