= Goraganamudi =

- Village
- Interactive map of Goraganamudi
- Location in Andhra Pradesh, India
- Country: India
- State: Andhra Pradesh
- District: West Godavari

Population (2011)
  - Total: 2,122

Languages
  - Official: Telugu
- Time zone: UTC+5:30 (IST)

Goraganamudi is a village located near Bhimavaram, West Godavari district, Andhra Pradesh. Nuclear Physicist Swami Jnanananda was born in this image. Pennada Agrhrm Railway Station and Vendra Railway Station are nearest train stations.

== Demographics ==
As of 2011 Census of India, Goraganamudi had a population of 2122. The total population constitute, 1069 males and 1053 females with a sex ratio of 985 females per 1000 males. 183 children are in the age group of 0–6 years, with sex ratio of 968. The average literacy rate stands at 84.01%.
