= Dorasanipadu =

- village
- Interactive map of Dorasanipadu
- Location in Andhra Pradesh, India Dorasanipadu (India)
- Coordinates: 16°58′27″N 81°15′30″E
- Country: India
- State: Andhra Pradesh
- District: Eluru
- Block: Dwaraka Tirumala

Population (2011)
  - Total: 3,059

Languages
  - Official: Telugu
- Time zone: UTC+5:30 (IST)
- PIN: 534426
- Telephone code: 08829
- Vehicle registration: AP39
- Nearest city: Eluru
- Lok Sabha constituency: U Arun Kumar
- Vidhan Sabha constituency: Chenuboyina Vengalrao

Dora-sani-padu is a small village near Dwaraka Tirumala in India. Dorasanipadu is located in Eluru district district of Andhra Pradesh. The nearest railway station is at Eluru located at a distance of more than 10 km.

== Demographics ==
As of 2011 Census of India, Dorasinapadu had a population of 3059. The total population constitute, 1565 males and 1494 females with a sex ratio of 955 females per 1000 males. 373 children are in the age group of 0–6 years, with sex ratio of 953. The average literacy rate stands at 66.05%.
