= Narasimhapuram =

- Village
- Interactive map of Narasimhapuram
- Location in Andhra Pradesh, India Narasimhapuram (India)
- Coordinates: 16.821745°N 81.221013°E
- Country: India
- State: Andhra Pradesh
- District: Eluru
- Mandal: Denduluru

Population (2011)
  - Total: 701

Languages
  - Official: Telugu
- Time zone: UTC+05:30 (IST)

Narasimhapuram is a village in Eluru district of the Indian state of Andhra Pradesh. It is administered under of Eluru revenue division.

== Demographics ==
As of 2011 Census of India, Narasimhapuram has population of 701 of which 360 are males while 341 are females. Average Sex Ratio is 947. Population of children with age 0-6 is 89 which makes up 12.70% of total population of village, Child sex ratio is 874. Literacy rate of the village was 66.99%.
