= Ballipadu, Tallapudi =

Ballipadu
- Village
- Interactive map of Ballipadu
- Location in Andhra Pradesh, India Ballipadu (India)
- Coordinates: 17°06′N 81°40′E
- Country: India
- State: Andhra Pradesh
- District: East Godavari
- Mandal: Tallapudi

Population (2011)
  - Total: 1,516

Languages
  - Official: Telugu
- Time zone: UTC+5:30 (IST)
- PIN: 534341
- Telephone code: 91-8813
- Vehicle registration: AP
- Distance from Amaravathi: 170 kilometres (110 mi) (Road)
- Distance from Vizag: 250 kilometres (160 mi) (Road)

Ballipadu is a village in East Godavari district of Andhra Pradesh, India. It is located in the Thallapudi mandal. It is located 86 km towards east from Eluru. Kovvur is the nearest railway station located at a distance of more than 10 km.

== Geography ==
This Place is in the border of the West Godavari District and East Godavari District. East Godavari District Seethanagaram is North towards this place.

== Demographics ==
As of 2011 Census of India, Ballipadu had a population of 1400. The total population constitute, 694 males and 706 females with a sex ratio of 1017 females per 1000 males. 162 children are in the age group of 0–6 years, with sex ratio of 1382. The average literacy rate stands at 70.88%.
