= Saripalle =

- Village
- Interactive map of Saripalle
- Location in Andhra Pradesh, India
- Coordinates: 16°41′29″N 81°27′56″E
- Country: India
- State: Andhra Pradesh
- District: West Godavari
- Talukas: Tadepalligudem

Area
  - Total: 6.19 km^{2} (2.39 sq mi)

Population (2011)
  - Total: 11,749
  - Density: 1,900/km^{2} (4,920/sq mi)

Languages
  - Official: Telugu
- Time zone: UTC+5:30 (IST)
- PIN: 534198
- Telephone code: 08818
- Vehicle registration: AP

Saripalle is a village in West Godavari district of the Indian state of Andhra Pradesh. It is located in Ganapavaram mandal of Eluru revenue division.
