= Agarru =

- Village
- Interactive map of Agarru
- Location in Andhra Pradesh, India Agarru (India)
- Coordinates: 16°29′44″N 81°40′38″E
- Country: India
- State: Andhra Pradesh

Population (2011)
  - Total: 4,363

Languages
  - Official: Telugu
- Time zone: UTC+5:30 (IST)
- Nearest city: Palakollu

Agarru is a village in Palakol mandal, located in West Godavari district of Andhra Pradesh, India. The nearest railway station is Palakollu train station.

== Demographics ==
As of the 2011 Census of India, Agarru had a population of 4,363. The total population constitutes 2,212 males and 2,151 females —a sex ratio of 972 females per 1000 males. 405 children are in the age group of 0–6 years, of which 200 are boys and 205 are girls —a ratio of 1025 per 1000. The average literacy rate stands at 84.13% with 3,330 literates, significantly higher than the state average of 67.41%.
