= Bethapudi, West Godavari =

Bethapudi
- village
- Interactive map of Bethapudi
- Location of Bhimavaram mandal in Andhra Pradesh, India Bethapudi (India)
- Coordinates: 16.496903°N 81.560078°E
- Country: India
- State: Andhra Pradesh
- District: West Godavari
- Mandal: Bhimavaram

Population (2011)
  - Total: 5,697

Languages
  - Official: Telugu
- Time zone: UTC+5:30 (IST)
- PIN: 534 207
- Telephone code: 08812

Bethapudi is a village in West Godavari district in the state of Andhra Pradesh in India.

== Demographics ==
As of 2011 India census, Bethapudi has a population of 3326 of which 1665 are males while 1661 are females. The average sex ratio of Bethapudi village is 998. The child population is 349, which makes up 10.49% of the total population of the village, with sex ratio 876. In 2011, the literacy rate of Bethapudi village was 81.93% when compared to 67.02% of Andhra Pradesh.

== See also ==
- Eluru
