= Chintaparru =

- Village
- Interactive map of Chintaparru
- Location in Andhra Pradesh, India Chintaparru (India)
- Coordinates: 16.5314°N 81.6939°E
- Country: India
- State: Andhra Pradesh
- District: West Godavari

Population (2011)
  - Total: 3,440

Languages
  - Official: Telugu
- Time zone: UTC+5:30 (IST)
- Nearest city: Palakollu

Chintaparru is a village in Palacole mandal, located in West Godavari district of the Indian state of Andhra Pradesh. Chintaparru has its own railway station connecting major cities.

== Demographics ==
As of 2011 Census of India, Chintaparru had a population of 3440. The total population constitute, 1775 males and 1665 females with a sex ratio of 938 females per 1000 males. 339 children are in the age group of 0–6 years, with sex ratio of 836. The average literacy rate stands at 72.98%.
