= Yerramalla =

Yerramalla is a village in the Eluru district of Andhra Pradesh, India. It is part of Unguturu mandal.
