= Rangapuram Khandrika =

Coordinates: 17°11′N 80°58′E

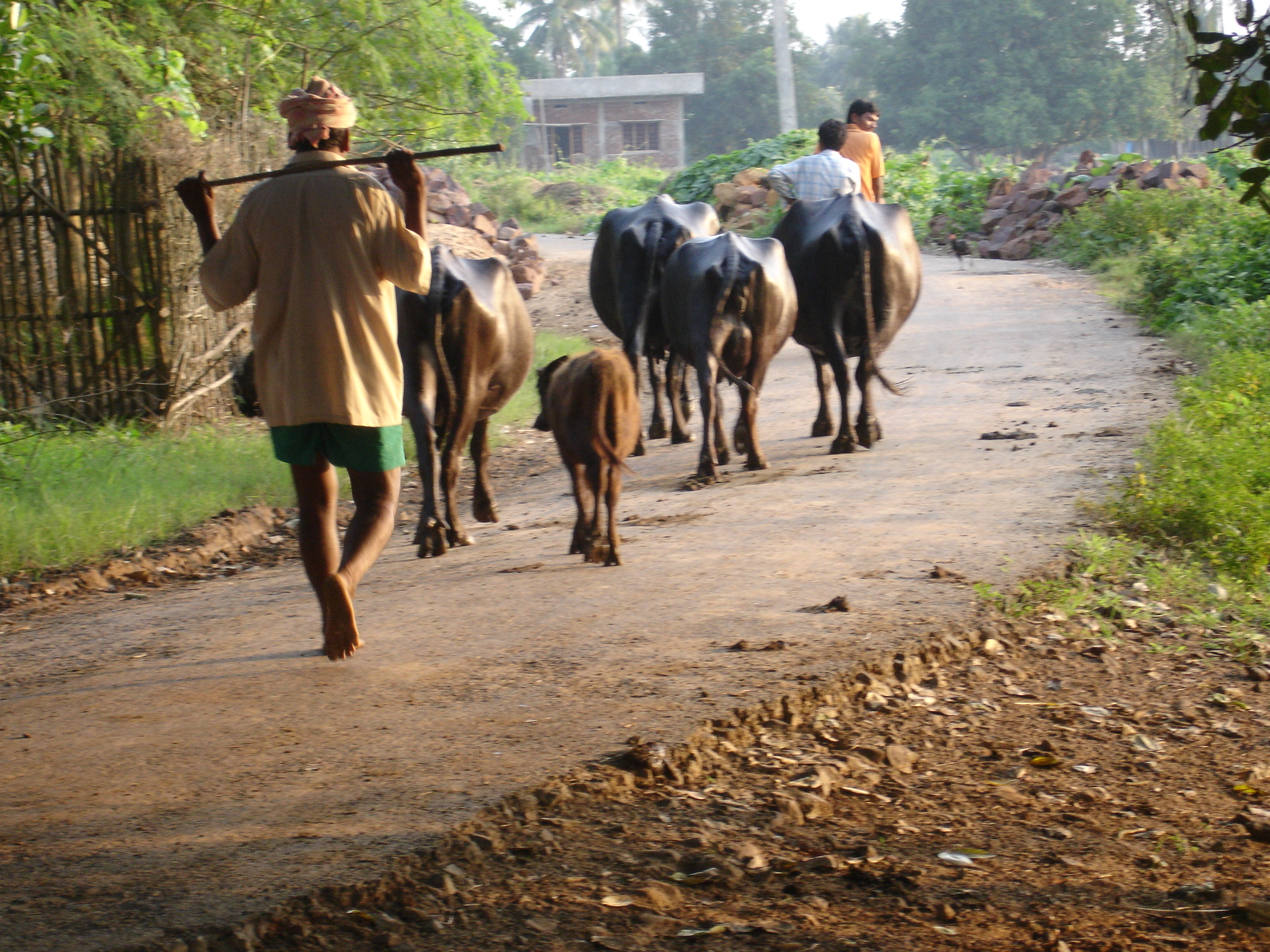
A scene in Rangapuram Khandrika

Rangapuram Khandrika (or Agraharam) is an agency village in Sitanagaram Gram panchayat of Chintalapudi mandal in Eluru district of Andhra Pradesh.
