= Vempadu, Anakapalli district =

Village in Andhra Pradesh, India

Vempadu is a village in Nakkapalle mandal in Anakapalli district of Andhra Pradesh state in the southern part of India. Vempadu is located 5 miles south of Nakkapalle on the trunk road.
