= Rayakuduru =

- Village
- Interactive map of Rayakuduru
- Coordinates: 16.5689°N 81.6645°E
- Country: India
- State: Andhra Pradesh
- District: West godavari

Population
  - Total: 12,000

Languages
  - Official: Telugu
- Time zone: UTC+5:30 (IST)
- PIN: 534247
- Telephone code: 08816
- Nearest city: Bhimavaram, Palakollu
- Lok Sabha constituency: Narsapur
- Vidhan Sabha constituency: Bhimavaram

Rayakuduru is a village which comes under Veeravasaram Mandal, West Godavari district, Andhra Pradesh, India.
