= Yerraicheruvu =

Village in Andhra Pradesh, India

Yerraicheruvu is a village located in Iragavaram mandal of West Godavari district, Andhra Pradesh, India.
