= Amudalachalaka =

- Village
- Interactive map of Amudalachalaka
- Location in Andhra Pradesh, India
- Coordinates: 17.061376°N 80.962885°E
- Country: India
- State: Andhra Pradesh
- District: Eluru

Population (2011)
  - Total: 475

Languages
- Time zone: UTC+5:30 (IST)
- PIN: 534460
- Telephone code: 08823
- Vehicle registration: AP

Amudalachalaka is a village in Eluru district of the Indian state of Andhra Pradesh. It is administered under Eluru revenue division. Eluru is the nearest train station located more than 10 km from Amudalachalaka.

== Demographics ==
Amudalachalaka is located in West Godavari district, Andhra Pradesh. It has a population of 475 of which 219 are males while 256 are females as per Population Census 2011. The population of children with age 0-6 is 59. Average Sex Ratio of the village is 1169 which is higher than Andhra Pradesh state average of 993. Child Sex Ratio of the village is 1458 as per census, higher than Andhra Pradesh average of 939. The village has higher literacy rate compared to Andhra Pradesh. In 2011, its literacy rate was 71.39% compared to 67.02% of Andhra Pradesh.
