= Singarajupalem =

Singarajupalem is a village located in Andhra Pradesh's East Godavari district. It is one among the 33 villages of Nallajerla mandal.
