= Yadavilli (name) =

Yadavalli is a surname and given name.

== Surname ==
Yadavalli is a Telaganya Brahmin surname used in the Indian states of Telangana and Andhra Pradesh. Variants of this surname include Yadavilli and Yedavalli. Sets of Yadavilli have settled in other cities including Bhimavaram, Rajahmundry, Berhampur, Srikakulam, Visakhapatnam, and Hyderabad. The geographic origin of this surname and the clan can be traced to Telangana's Medak-Basar region on the banks of Godavari river. They are supposed to have been forced out from this area by the Moghuls and ended up sailing along the Godavari river culminating in Bhimavaram. From there on, parts of the clan drifted along the land northwards towards Visakhapatnam, Srikakulam and Berhampur. They worship Lord Venkata Ramana as their deity.

They belong Atreya (Atreyasa) Gotra and belong to the pravara - Atreyasa, Aarchanaasa, Syaavaasva.

== Given name ==
Notable people with the given name include:

- Yadavalli Suryanarayana (1888–1939), Indian actor
