= Elurupadu =

Coordinates: 16°31′N 81°21′E

- Village
- Interactive map of Elurupadu
- Country: India
- State: Andhra Pradesh
- District: West Godavari

Population (2011)
  - Total: 9,423

Languages
  - Official: Telugu
- Time zone: UTC+5:30 (IST)

Elurupadu is a small village in the Kalla mandal of West Godavari district in Andhra Pradesh, India, a border village of West Godavari and Krishna district where temples of Lord Shiva and Lord Venkateswara are located, which are nearly 600–700 years old but the history of them is not known yet. Akividu railway station is the nearest train station.

== Etymology ==
The original name of this village was Yelurupadu stated by historical reports. Because this village is surrounded by Upputeru, a medium-size river / channel for the outlet of Koleru Lake to enter into the Bay of Bangal.

== Demographics ==
As of 2011 Census of India, Elurupadu had a population of 9423. The total population constitute, 4737 males and 4686 females with a sex ratio of 989 females per 1000 males. 831 children are in the age group of 0–6 years, with sex ratio of 951. The average literacy rate stands at 71.69%.
