= Usulumarru =

Usulumarru ఉసులుమర్రు
- Revenue Village
- Interactive map of Usulumarru
- Coordinates: 16.817850833963572°N 81.73517724365013°E
- Country: India
- State: Andhra Pradesh
- District: East Godavari
- Mandal: Peravali

Area
  - Total: 4.72 km^{2} (1.82 sq mi)
- PIN: 534329
- Area code: +91

Usulumarru is a village in East Godavari district, Andhra Pradesh, by the Godavari River.
