= Kovvada, West Godavari =

Kovvada
- village
- Interactive map of Kovvada
- Location of Bhimavaram mandal in Andhra Pradesh, India Kovvada (India)
- Coordinates: 16.568380°N 81.515553°E
- Country: India
- State: Andhra Pradesh
- District: West Godavari
- Mandal: Bhimavaram

Population (2011)
  - Total: 2,861

Languages
  - Official: Telugu
- Time zone: UTC+5:30 (IST)
- PIN: 534 206
- Telephone code: 08812

Kovvada is a village in West Godavari district in the state of Andhra Pradesh in India.

== Demographics ==
As of 2011 India census, Kovvada has a population of 2861 of which 1395 are males while 1466 are females. The average sex ratio of Kovvada village is 1051. The child population is 322, which makes up 11.25% of the total population of the village, with sex ratio 952. In 2011, the literacy rate of Kovvada village was 70.26% when compared to 67.02% of Andhra Pradesh.

== See also ==
- Kovvada Atomic Power Project
- Eluru
