= Kalavalapalli =

Kalavalapalli Kalavalapalle
- village
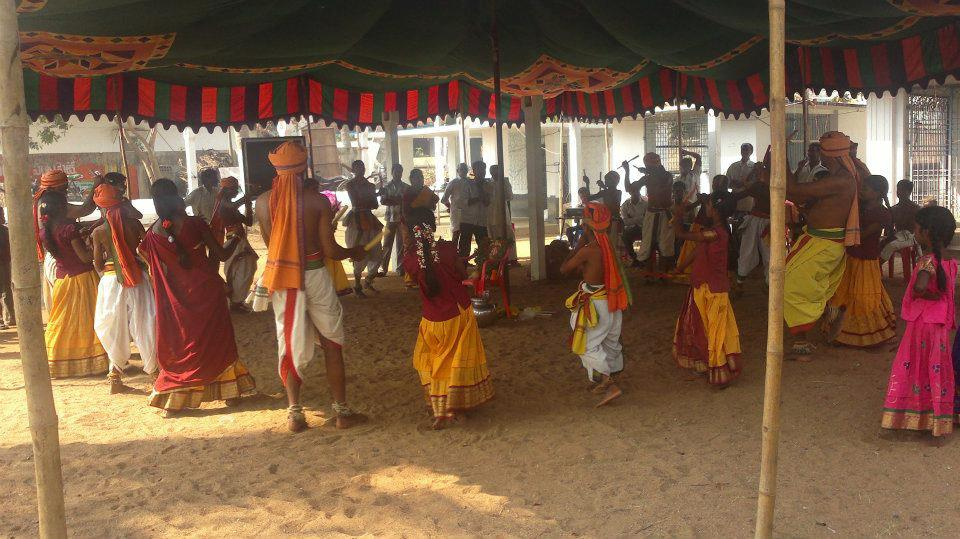
- Interactive map of Kalavalapalli
- Location in Andhra Pradesh, India Kalavalapalli (India)
- Coordinates: 16.93°N 81.63°E
- Country: India
- State: Andhra Pradesh
- District: East Godavari

Government
  - Type: Panchayat
  - Body: Kalavalapalli

Area
  - Total: 12.75 km^{2} (4.92 sq mi)

Population (2011)
  - Total: 5,984
  - Density: 469.3/km^{2} (1,216/sq mi)

Languages
  - Official: Telugu
- Time zone: UTC+5:30 (IST)
- PIN: 534301
- Telephone code: 08813
- Vehicle registration: AP37
- Nearest city: Nidadavole
- Lok Sabha constituency: Rajahmundry
- Vidhan Sabha constituency: Kovvur
- Civic agency: Kalavalapalli

Kalavalapalli is a village in Chagallu mandal in East Godavari district in Andhra Pradesh state in India. Brahmanagudem Railway Station and Chagallu Railway Station are the nearest railway stations.

== Demographics ==
As of 2011 census, village has population of 5984. Number of families was found to be 1685. Village has a sex ratio (male:female) of 1000:1019 with 2964 male and 3020 female population. This village is the least populated village in the Mandal. Growth rate of population is 7.53% from 2001 to 2011. Population of the village is expected to rise to 6,500 by 2021. The village has a literacy rate of 60.13%.
