= Pangidigudem, Dwarakatirumala mandal =

Pangidigudem Raja pangidigudem
- Village
- Interactive map of Pangidigudem
- Location in Andhra Pradesh, India Pangidigudem (India)
- Coordinates: 16°51′46″N 81°14′44″E
- Country: India
- State: Andhra Pradesh
- District: Eluru

Population
  - Total: 5,000

Languages
  - Official: Telugu
- Time zone: UTC+5:30 (IST)
- Nearest city: Eluru

Pangidigudem is a village in Eluru district, Andhra Pradesh, India. It is located near Dwarakatirumala mandal.

== Demographics ==
As of 2011 Census of India, Pangidigudem had a population of 5543. The total population constitute, 2834 males and 2709 females with a sex ratio of 956 females per 1000 males. 571 children are in the age group of 0–6 years, with sex ratio of 976. The average literacy rate stands at 75.44%.
