= Komarada, West Godavari =

Komarada komarada
- village
- Interactive map of Komarada
- Location of Bhimavaram mandal in Andhra Pradesh, India Komarada (India)
- Coordinates: 16.493835°N 81.507861°E
- Country: India
- State: Andhra Pradesh
- District: West Godavari
- Mandal: Bhimavaram

Government
  - Type: state government
  - Body: local body

Area
  - Total: 6.3 km^{2} (2.4 sq mi)

Population (2011)
  - Total: 2,289
  - Density: 360/km^{2} (940/sq mi)

Languages
  - Official: Telugu
- Time zone: UTC+5:30 (IST)
- PIN: 534208
- Telephone code: 08812

Komarada is a village in West Godavari district in the state of Andhra Pradesh in India.

== Demographics ==
As of 2011 India census, Komarada has a population of 2289 of which 1172 are males while 1117 are females. The average sex ratio of Komarada village is 953. The child population is 216, which makes up 9.44% of the total population of the village, with sex ratio 982. In 2011, the literacy rate of Komarada village was 76.22% when compared to 67.02% of Andhra Pradesh.

== See also ==
- Eluru
