= Velagadurru =

Village in Andhra Pradesh, India

- village
- Interactive map of Velagadurru
- Location in Andhra Pradesh, India Velagadurru (India)
- Coordinates: 16.799485°N 81.723872°E
- Country: India
- State: Andhra Pradesh
- District: East Godavari
- Elevation: 13 m (43 ft)

Population (2001)
  - Total: 2,352

Languages
  - Official: Telugu
- Time zone: UTC+5:30 (IST)
- PIN: 534227
- Telephone code: 91-8819
- Website: www.velagadurru.org

Velagadurru, is a village in East Godavari district of Andhra Pradesh, India.
