= Dharmapuram, West Godavari =

Dharmapuram
- village
- Interactive map of Dharmapuram
- Location of Achanta mandal in Andhra Pradesh, India Dharmapuram (India)
- Coordinates: 16.624877°N 81.349057°E
- Country: India
- State: Andhra Pradesh
- District: West Godavari
- Mandal: Akividu

Population (2011)
  - Total: 1,010

Languages
  - Official: Telugu
- Time zone: UTC+5:30 (IST)
- PIN: 534 235
- Telephone code: 08812

Dharmapuram is a village in West Godavari district in the state of Andhra Pradesh in India.

== Demographics ==
As of 2011 India census, Dharmapuram has a population of 1010 of which 510 are males while 500 are females. The average sex ratio of Dharmapuram village is 980. The child population is 114, which makes up 11.29% of the total population of the village, with sex ratio 966. In 2011, the literacy rate of Dharmapuram village was 70.54% when compared to 67.02% of Andhra Pradesh.

== See also ==
- West Godavari district
