= Tadikalapudi =

- Tadikalapudi
- Interactive map of Tadikalapudi
- Location in Andhra Pradesh, India Tadikalapudi (India)
- Coordinates: 16.53558°N 81.10329°E
- Country: India
- State: Andhra Pradesh
- District: Eluru
- Mandal: Kamavarapukota
- Founder: K.Rambabu

Area
  - Total: 1.06 km^{2} (0.41 sq mi)
- Elevation: 19 m (62 ft)

Population (2011)
  - Total: 17,156
  - Rank: 77

Languages
  - Official: Telugu
- Time zone: UTC+05:30 (IST)
- Postal code: 534 452

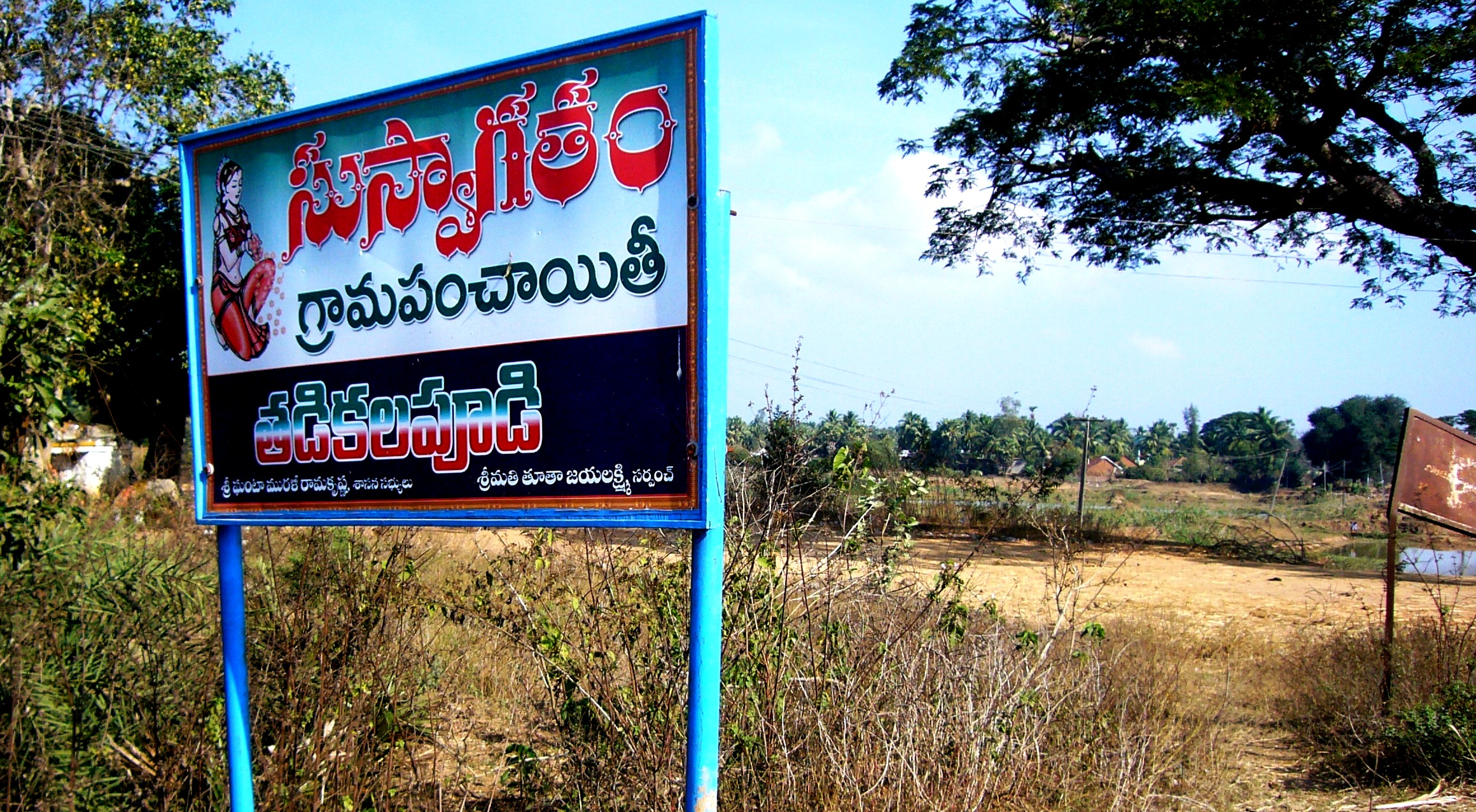
Signboard at the entrance to Tadikalapudi village

Tadikalapudi is a village in Eluru district of the Indian state of Andhra Pradesh. It is located in Kamavarapukota mandal of Eluru revenue division. It is located at a distance of 26 km from district headquarters Eluru city.

== Demographics ==
As of 2011 Census of India, Tadikalapudi had a population of 17156. The total population constitute, 8267 males and 7968 females a sex ratio of 964 females per 1000 males. 1783 children are in the age group of 0–6 years, with child sex ratio of 875 girls per 1000 boys. The average literacy rate stands at 67.38% with literates.
