= Gunnampalli =

- Village
- Interactive map of Gunnampalli
- Location in Andhra Pradesh, India
- Country: India
- State: Andhra Pradesh
- District: Eluru

Population (2011)
  - Total: 4,951

Languages
  - Official: Telugu
- Time zone: UTC+5:30 (IST)

Gunnampalli is a village in West Godavari district of Andhra Pradesh in India. Pulla and Kaikaram railway Station are the nearest railway stations.

== Geography ==
It is located in Dwarkatirumala mandal, on a hilly terrain.

== Demographics ==
As of 2011 Census of India, Gunnampalle had a population of 4951. The total population constitute, 2504 males and 247 females with a sex ratio of 977 females per 1000 males. 469 children are in the age group of 0–6 years, with sex ratio of 946. The average literacy rate stands at 72.29%.
