= Pedakadimi =

- village
- Interactive map of Pedakadimi
- Location in Andhra Pradesh, India Pedakadimi (India)
- Coordinates: 16.70923°N 81.10138°E
- Country: India
- State: Andhra Pradesh
- District: Eluru

Area
  - Total: 2 km^{2} (0.77 sq mi)

Population
  - Total: 3,000
  - Density: 1,500/km^{2} (3,900/sq mi)

Languages
  - Official: Telugu
- Time zone: UTC+5:30 (IST)
- PIN: 534003
- Telephone code: 08812
- Vehicle registration: AP
- Nearest city: Eluru
- Lok Sabha constituency: Eluru
- Vidhan Sabha constituency: Denduluru

Pedakadimi is a panchayat in Eluru district in the Indian state of Andhra Pradesh. This village is about 9 km from Eluru, the headquarters of the district. Vatlur railway station and Powerpet railway station are the two nearest railway stations to Pedakadimi.
