= Konijerla, Eluru district =

Coordinates: 16°54′N 80°58′E

Konijerla
- Village
- Interactive map of Konijerla
- Country: India
- State: Andhra Pradesh
- District: Eluru

Population (2011)
  - Total: 980

Languages
  - Official: Telugu
- Time zone: UTC+5:30 (IST)

Konijerla is a village in Lingapallem mandal of Eluru district in Andhra Pradesh. The village is on the banks of Tammileru. The nearest train station is located Eluru.

== Demographics ==
As of 2011 Census of India, Konijerla had a population of 980. The total population constitutes 489 males and 491 females with a sex ratio of 1004 females per 1000 males. 86 children are in the age group of 0–6 years, with sex ratio of 1457. The average literacy rate stands at 73.15%.
