= Lankalakoderu =

- Village
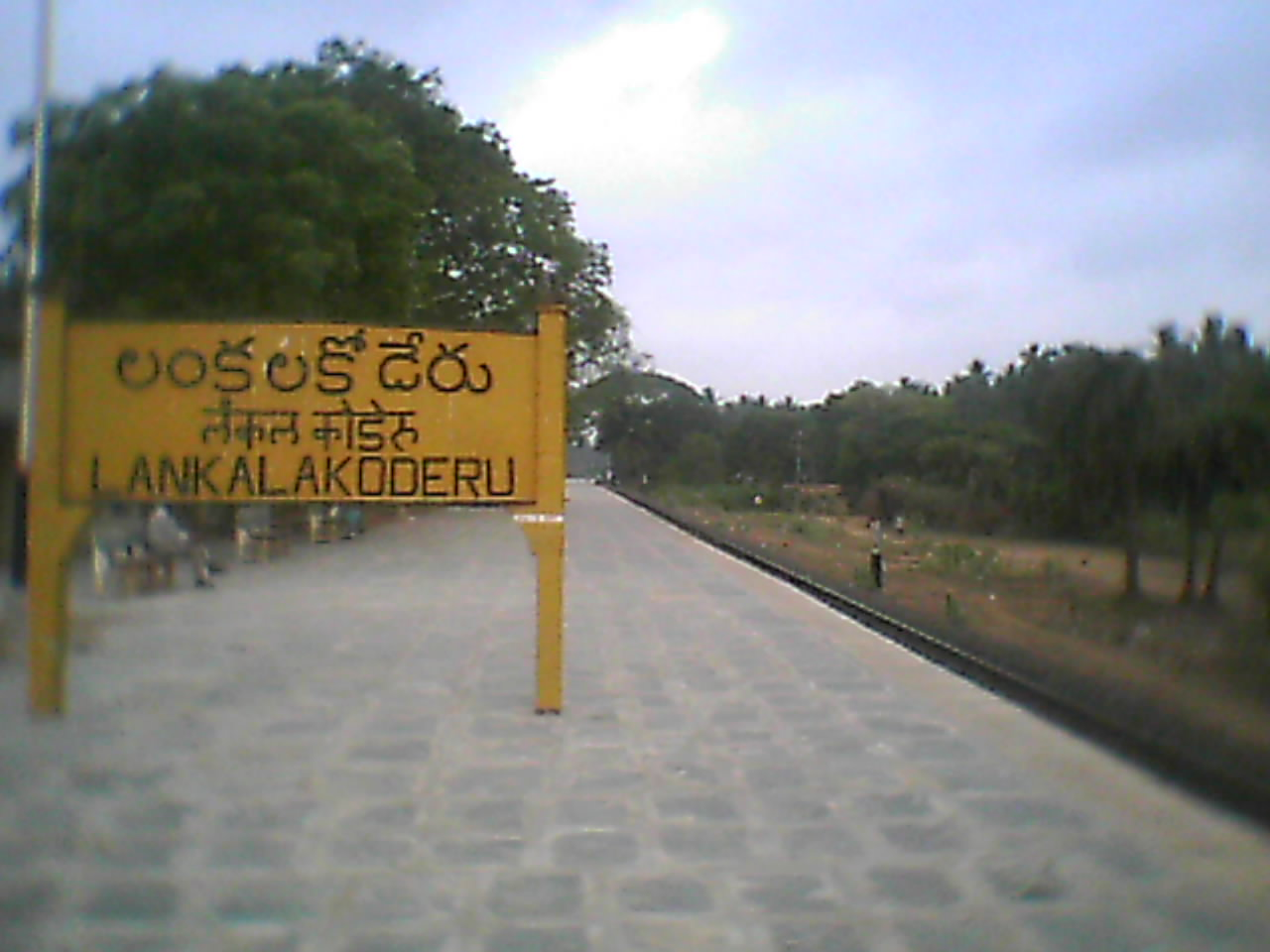
- Railway station board
- Interactive map of Lankalakoderu
- Location in Andhra Pradesh, India
- Coordinates: 16°31′38″N 81°41′00″E
- Country: India
- State: Andhra Pradesh
- District: West Godavari

Population (2011)
  - Total: 6,759

Languages
  - Official: Telugu
- Time zone: UTC+5:30 (IST)
- PIN: 534250
- Vehicle registration: AP37
- Nearest city: Narsapuram
- Lok Sabha constituency: Eluru
- Vidhan Sabha constituency: Narsapuram
- Nearest city: Palakollu
- Climate: hot (Köppen)

Lankalakoderu is a village in West Godavari District, India. It is exactly 4 km away from Palakol. Lankalakoderu (LKDU) has its own railway station connecting major cities.

== Government and politics ==
Lankalakoderu gram panchayat is the local self-government of the village. The elected members of the gram panchayat is headed by a sarpanch. The sarpanch of the villages was awarded Nirmala Grama Puraskaram for the year 2013.

== Demographics ==
As of 2011 Census of India, Lankalakoderu had a population of 6759. The total population constitutes 3344 males and 3415 females with a sex ratio of 1021 females per 1000 males. 573 children are in the age group of 0–6 years, with sex ratio of 976. The average literacy rate stands at 79.60%.
