= Arjunudupalam =

Arjunudupalem
- Interactive map of Arjunudupalem
- Location in Andhra Pradesh, India Arjunudupalem (India)
- Coordinates: 16.677846°N 81.68006°E
- Country: India
- State: Andhra Pradesh
- District: West Godavari

Government
  - MLA (Tanuku Assembly): karumuri venkata nageswarao garu (2019 - present)

Population (2021)
  - Total: 5,000

Languages
  - Official: Telugu
- Time zone: UTC+5:30 (IST)
- PIN: 534217
- Telephone code: 08819

Arjunudupalem is a village in Iragavaram Mandal in the West Godavari district of the Indian state of Andhra Pradesh. Velpuru and Relangi Railway stations are the nearest train stations location at a distance of 7 km and 8 km respectively from Arjunudupalam.

== Geography ==
It is located east of the district headquarters, Eluru.
