= Kothota =

- Village
- Country: India
- State: Andhra Pradesh
- District: West Godavari

Languages
  - Official: Telugu
- Time zone: UTC+5:30 (IST)
- PIN: 534 xxx
- Telephone code: +91–08814

Kothota is a village in West Godavari district of the Indian state of Andhra Pradesh. It is located in Mogalthur mandal of Narasapuram revenue division. Lankalakoderu railway station and Narasapur railway station are the nearest train stations located at more than 10 Km from Kothota.
