= Tadiparru =

Coordinates: 16°47′N 81°43′E

- village
- Interactive map of Tadiparru
- Country: India
- State: Andhra Pradesh
- District: East Godavari
- Talukas: Undrajavaram

Population (2011)
  - Total: 6,200

Languages
  - Official: Telugu
- Time zone: UTC+5:30 (IST)
- PIN: 534227
- Telephone code: 08819

Tadiparru, is a village in East Godavari district of Andhra Pradesh, India.
