= Markundapadu =

Markondapadu is a village near by a town Nidadavole (South-West) and Kovvur (North-East) in Chagallu mandal, East Godavari district, Andhra Pradesh State, India. This village is a bramin agharam since hundred of years who are the owners of thousands of aches of land . The vast water body which gets its water from the nearby Kovvada stream which is dug during the time of Kakatiya kings of Nidadavolu, which is the in law's town of the mighty queen Rudhrama Devi.

== Demographics ==
As of 2011 Census of India, Markondapadu had a population of 4887. The total population constitute, 2412 males and 2475 females with a sex ratio of 1026 females per 1000 males. 505 children are in the age group of 0–6 years, with sex ratio of 1053. The average literacy rate stands at 73.09%.
