= Rajupothepalle =

Village in T.Narasapuram Mandal, India

Rajupothepalle is a village in T.Narasapuram mandal, Eluru district, Andhra Pradesh, India. As of the 2011 Census of India, it has a population of 1,807 people, with 924 males and 883 females. 1,024 inhabitants were recorded as being literate.
