= Vinayaka temple =

List of Hindu god temple in india

Vinayaka temple is a Hindu temple dedicated to Lord Ganesha.

== Forms ==
The following are some of the forms of Ganesha appearing mainly in temples:

- Karpaga Vinayakar in Karpaka Vinayakar Temple
- Ganesha in Ganesha Temple, Morgaon
- Siddhivinayaka in Siddhivinayak Temple, Mumbai
- Ganapathy in Kottarakkara Sree Mahaganapathi Kshethram
- Varasiddhi Vinayaka in Varasiddhi Vinayaka Temple
- Munthi Vinayagar in Arulmigu Munthi Vinayagar Temple
