= Ananthapalli =

Village in Andhra Pradesh, India

Ananthapalli is a village located in East Godavari district, Andhra Pradesh, India. The village is famous for its paddy field, maize crops and sugar cane cultivation. There is a population of around 12,412 in the village.

Ananthapalli is the village where Yerrakaluva and Polavaram Project meets.
