= Vempadu, West Godavari district =

Vempadu
- Village
- Interactive map of Vempadu
- Location in Andhra Pradesh, India Vempadu (India)
- Coordinates: 16.5323°N 81.4821°E
- Country: India
- State: Andhra Pradesh
- District: West Godavari

Government
  - Body: Gram Panchayat

Population (2011)
  - Total: 2,277

Languages
  - Official: Telugu
- Time zone: UTC+5:30 (IST)
- PIN: 534 206

Vempadu is a village in West Godavari district of the Indian state of Andhra Pradesh. It is located in kalla mandal.

== Demographics ==
As of 2011 Census of India, Vempadu had a population of 2277. The total population constitute, 1140 males and 1137 females with a sex ratio of 997 females per 1000 males. 270 children are in the age group of 0–6 years with sex ratio of 1045. The average literacy rate stands at 63.58%.
