= Garlamadugu =

- Village
- Interactive map of Garlamadugu
- Location in Andhra Pradesh, India Garlamadugu (India)
- Coordinates: 16.799181°N 81.088573°E
- Country: India
- State: Andhra Pradesh
- Districts: Eluru
- Elevation: 21 m (69 ft)

Languages
  - Official: Telugu
- Time zone: UTC+5:30 (IST)
- Area code: 08812

Garlamadugu is a village in Pedavegi mandal, located in Eluru district of Andhra Pradesh, India.
