= Ballipadu, Palakol =

Ballipadu
- Village
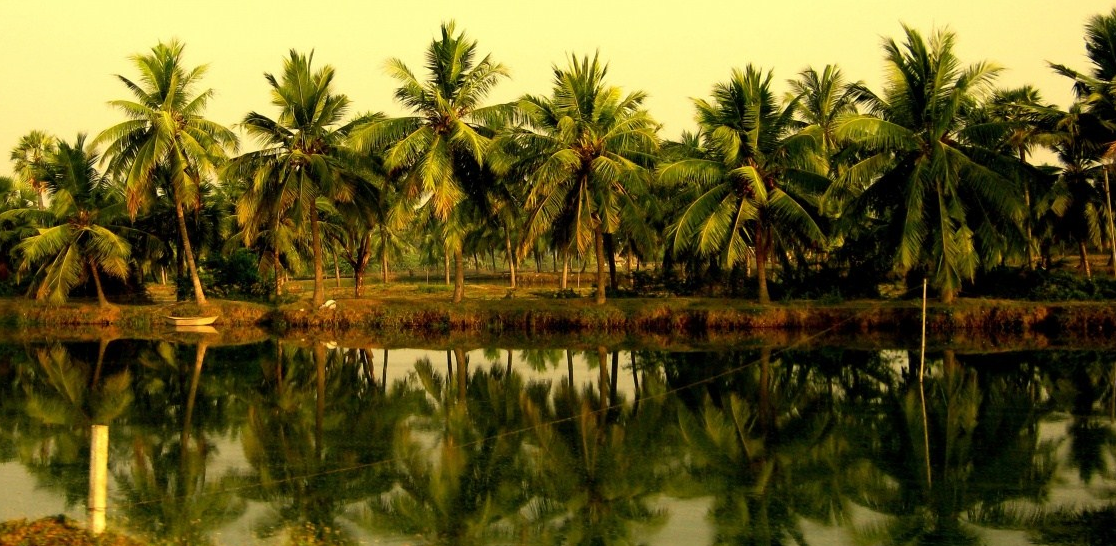
- Beautiful view at Ballipadu
- Interactive map of Ballipadu
- Location within Andhra Pradesh
- Coordinates: 16.532493°N 81.657617°E
- Country: India
- State: Andhra Pradesh
- District: West Godavari
- Time zone: UTC+05:30 (IST)
- Pincode: 534245
- Nearest city: Palakollu

Ballipadu is a village in Palakol mandal, located in West Godavari district of Andhra Pradesh, India. Lankalakoderu and Viravasaram Railway Stations are the nearest railway stations.

== Demographics ==
As of 2011 Census of India, Ballipadu had a population of 1400. The total population constitute, 694 males and 706 females with a sex ratio of 1017 females per 1000 males. 162 children are in the age group of 0–6 years, with sex ratio of 1017. The average literacy rate stands at 79.24%.
