= Allipalle =

- Village
- Interactive map of Allipalle
- Location in Andhra Pradesh, India
- Coordinates: 17.185793°N 80.997519°E
- Country: India
- State: Andhra Pradesh
- District: Eluru

Population (2011)
  - Total: 1,282

Languages
- Time zone: UTC+5:30 (IST)
- PIN: 534460
- Telephone code: 08823
- Vehicle registration: AP

Allipalle is a village in Eluru district of the Indian state of Andhra Pradesh . The nearest railway station is Sitampet(STPT) located at a distance of 47.79 km.

== Demographics ==
Allipalle is located in Eluru district, Andhra Pradesh. It has population of 1282 of which 648 are males, while 634 are females as per the population census of 2011. The population of children with age 0-6 is 82. Average Sex Ratio of the village is 978 which is higher than Andhra Pradesh's state average of 993. Child Sex Ratio of the village is 1128 as per census, higher than Andhra Pradesh average of 939. The village has a higher literacy rate compared to Andhra Pradesh. In 2011, its literacy rate was 78.65% compared to 67.02% of Andhra Pradesh.
