= Prakasaraopalem =

- village
- Interactive map of Prakasaraopalem
- Location in Andhra Pradesh, India
- Coordinates: 15.501181°N 80.047871°E
- Country: India
- State: Andhra Pradesh
- District: East Godavari

Prakasaraopalem is a village in Nallajerla mandal, East Godavari district, Andhra Pradesh, India.

It comes under Gopalapuram Assembly constituency and Rajahmundry parliamentary constituency.

The village has 4,000+ people with various religions like Hindu, Christian and Muslim.

Kambalamma is the village goddess. There are many other temples named Ramalayam, Saibaba temple, Parvathi sametha Mallikarjuna swami temple, Kanakadurga temple, Subrahmanyeswara swamy temple, Vinayaka temple and some other churches.

The village has the educational resources with m.p.u.p school and Z.P.H school run by the state government, Rushi Model EM School an upper primary school, and WISE engineering college. The nearest railway station is Chebrol (CEL) located at a distance of 7.78 Km.

The village is surrounded by the water bodies 5 ponds in the corners of the village. Rice, wheat, sugar cane, grains, vegetables are majorly grown crops in the habitat.

== Demographics ==
As of 2011 Census of India, Prakasaraopalem had a population of 4,721. The total population constitute, 2,385 males and 2,336 females with a sex ratio of 979 females per 1000 males. 483 children are in the age group of 0–6 years, with a sex ratio of 894. The average literacy rate stands at 71.28%.
