= Bhogole, Eluru district =

Bhogolu
- Village
- Interactive map of Bhogolu
- Location in Andhra Pradesh, India
- Coordinates: 16°55′24″N 81°02′44″E
- Country: India
- State: Andhra Pradesh
- District: Eluru
- Mandal: Lingapalem

Area
  - Total: 24.01 km^{2} (9.27 sq mi)

Population (2011)
  - Total: 5,709
  - Density: 237.8/km^{2} (615.8/sq mi)

Languages
  - Official: Telugu
- Time zone: UTC+5:30 (IST)

Bhogolu is a village in Eluru district of the Indian state of Andhra Pradesh. It is located in Lingapalem mandal of Eluru revenue division. Eluru is the nearest railway station which is located more than 10 km.

== Demographics ==
As of 2011 Census of India, Bhogole had a population of 5709. The total population constitute, 2911 males and 2798 females with a sex ratio of 961 females per 1000 males. 529 children are in the age group of 0–6 years, with sex ratio of 1063. The average literacy rate stands at 66.99%.
