= Polamuru, West Godavari district =

Polamuru
- Village
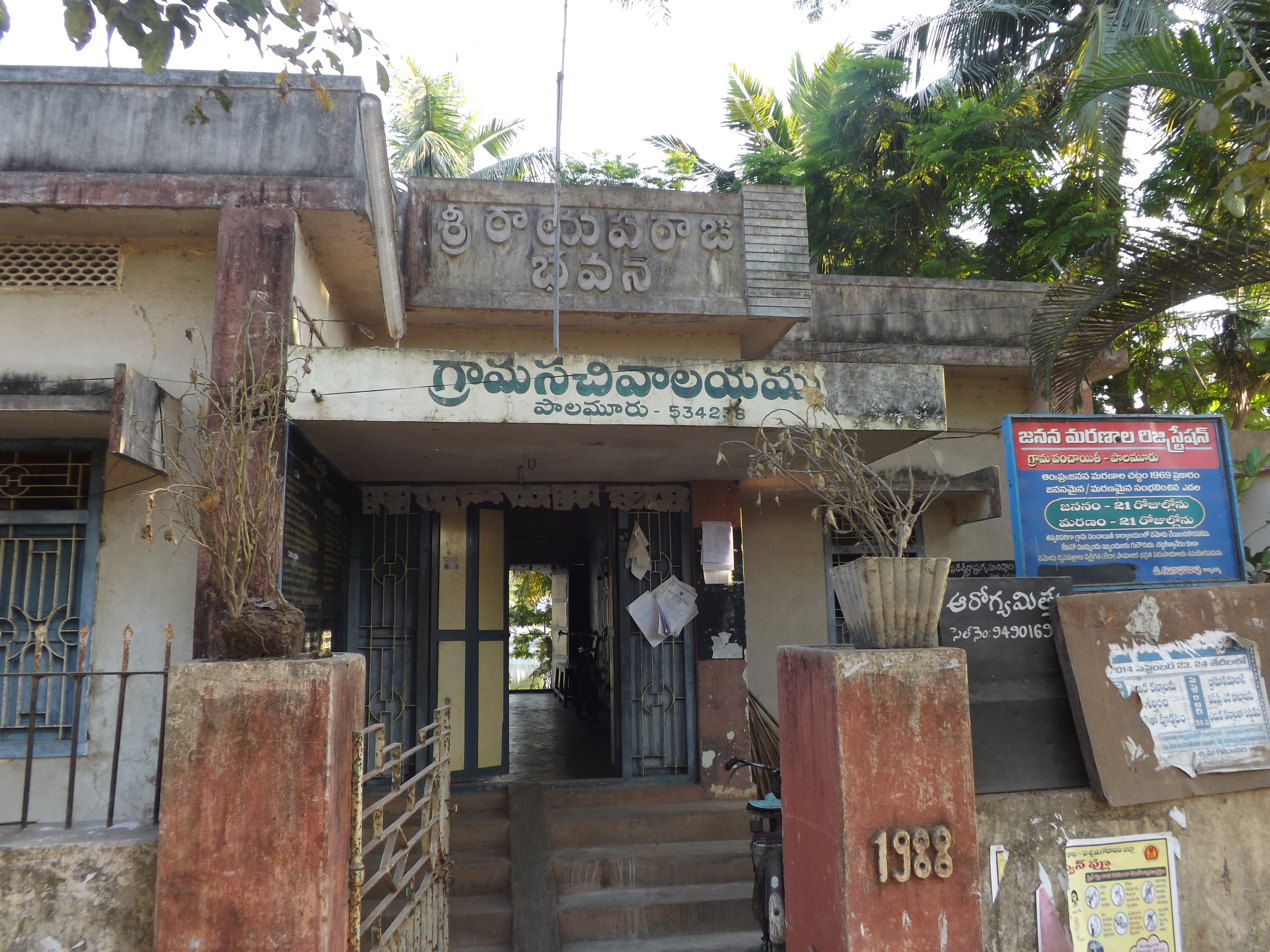
- Village hall
- Interactive map of Polamuru
- Location in Andhra Pradesh, India
- Coordinates: 16.618983°N 81.640820°E
- Country: India
- State: Andhra Pradesh
- District: West Godavari
- Mandal: Penumantra
- Time zone: UTC+05:30 (IST)
- Pincode: 534238

Polamuru is a village in West Godavari district of the Indian state of Andhra Pradesh.

== Demographics ==
As of 2011 Census of India, Polamuru had a population of 6,170. The total population constitute, 3,118 males and 3,052 females with a sex ratio of 979 females per 1,000 males. Five hundred and sixty-one children are in the age group of 0–6 years, with sex ratio of 759 The average literacy rate stands at 76.48%.

== Geography ==
The village located in Penumantra Mandal within West Godavari district of Andhra Pradesh, India. It lies at coordinates 16.6192° N and 81.6412° E, at an elevation of approximately 13 meters above sea level, covering an area of about 7.87 km².
