= Guntupalle Buddhist Caves =

Ancient Buddhist site in India

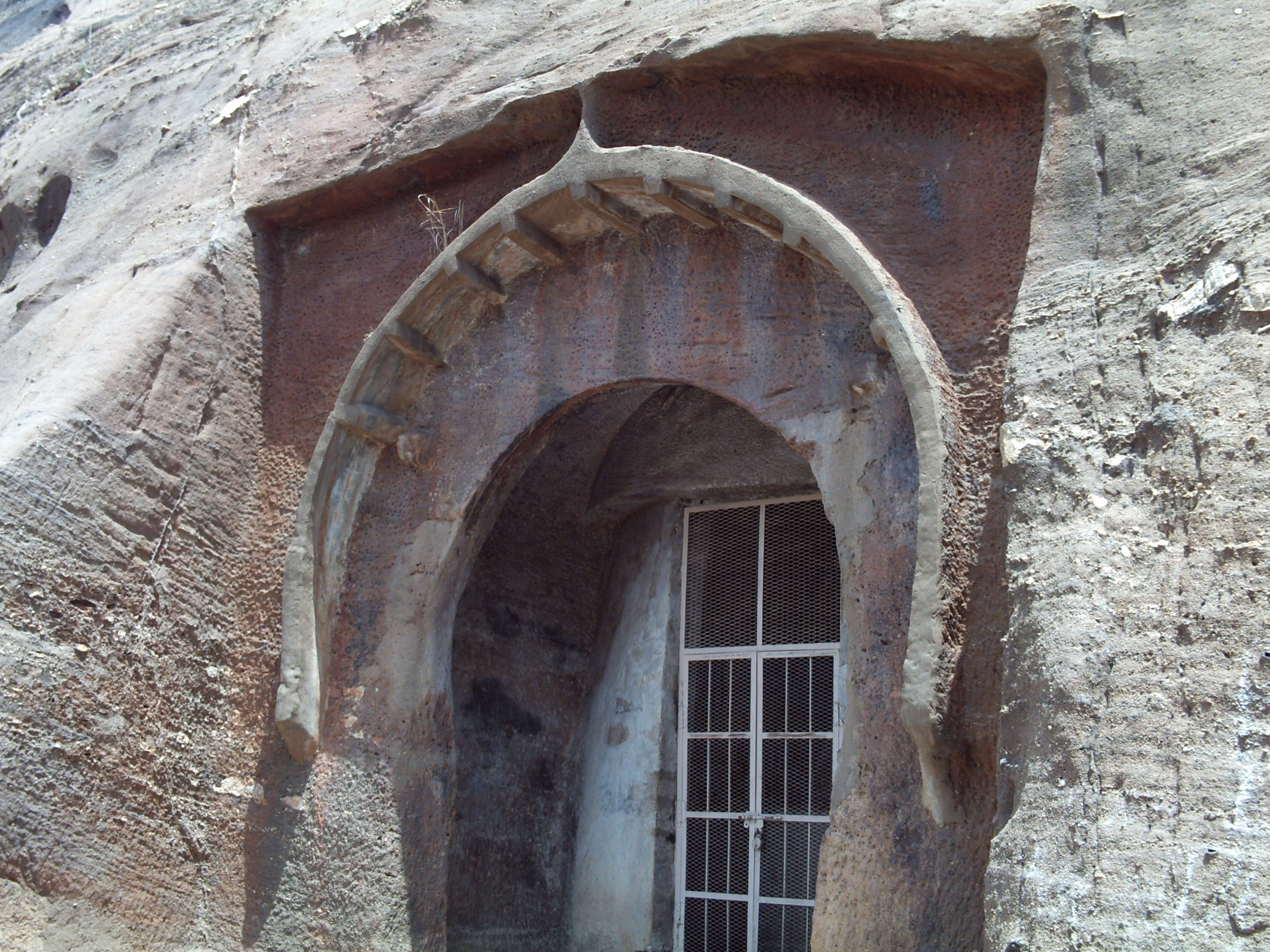
- Entrance to the chaitya hall at Guntupalle, Andhra Pradesh.

- Location within Andhra Pradesh Location within India

Religion
- Affiliation: Buddhism
- District: Eluru

Location
- Location: Guntupalli
- State: Andhra Pradesh
- Country: India
- Coordinates: 17.0188889°N 81.1305556°E

Architecture
- Style: Buddhist caves

The Guntupalle Buddhist Caves or Guntupalli Group of Buddhist Monuments is located near Kamavarapukota, Eluru district, in the state of Andhra Pradesh in India. It is around 40 km away from Eluru. The rock-cut part of the site has two Buddhist caves, a chaitya hall and a large group of stupas. The chaitya hall has a rare carved stone entrance replicating wooden architecture, a simpler version of that at the Lomas Rishi Cave.

There are remains of structural buildings in brick and stone, including remains of two vihara made of brick, as well as excavated caves at two levels, including an unusual structural chaitya hall (that is, one built above ground). The core of this consists of the stone stupa with an enclosed path around it allowing ritual parikrama (circumambulation). They mostly date to 200-0 BCE, with some sculptures added later. The main building above ground is in brick, around a stone stupa, with over 30 smaller stupas on a terrace in front of it. There are ruins of two other buildings.

During excavation, three relic caskets were found. The caskets had many precious elements like gold, silver, crystal beads. The bronze image of Padmapani was found along with one of the caskets. The inscription on the casket was in the Devanagari script which indicates the year as from the 9th to 10th century CE.

== Gallery ==
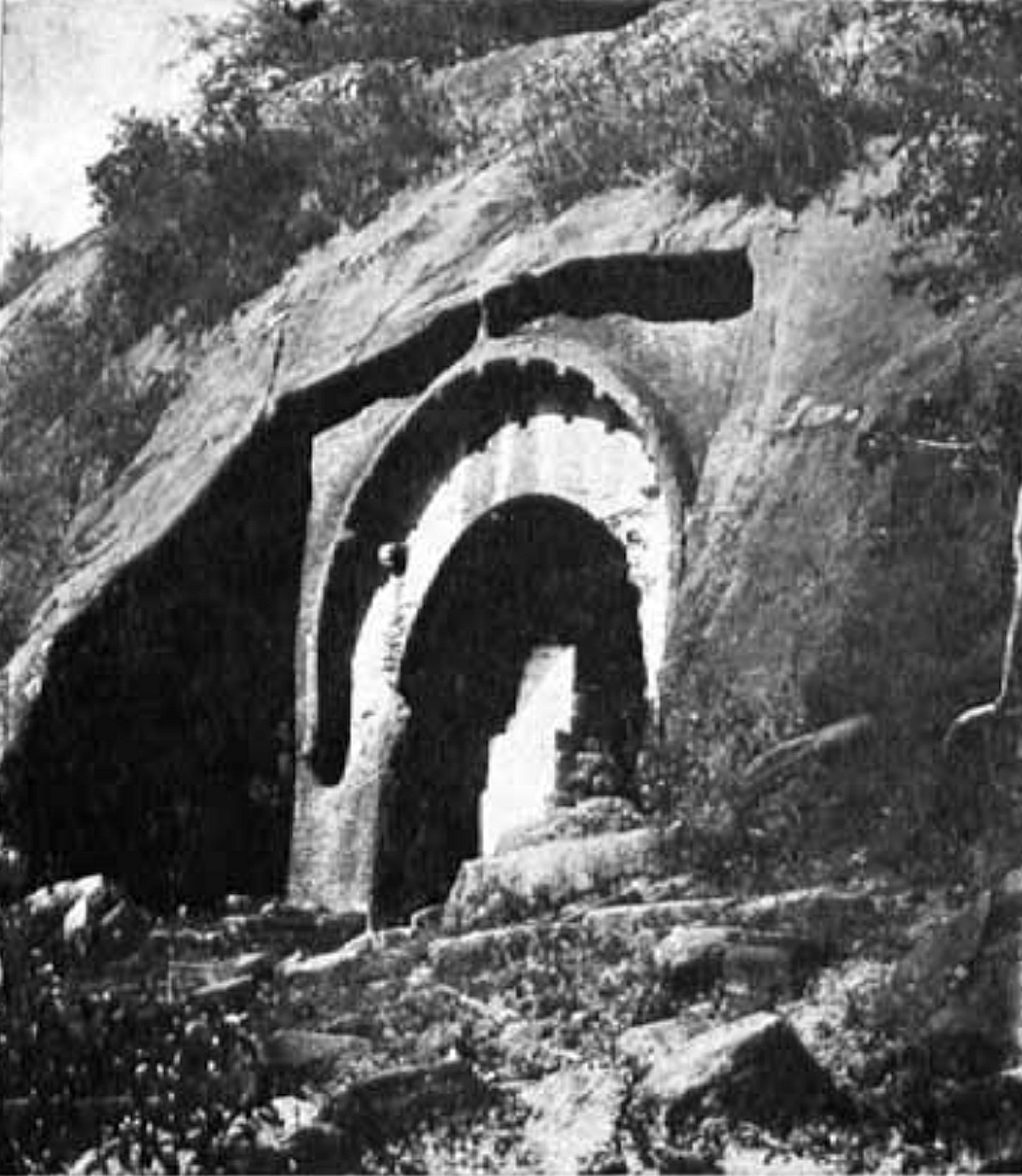
Guntupalli cave

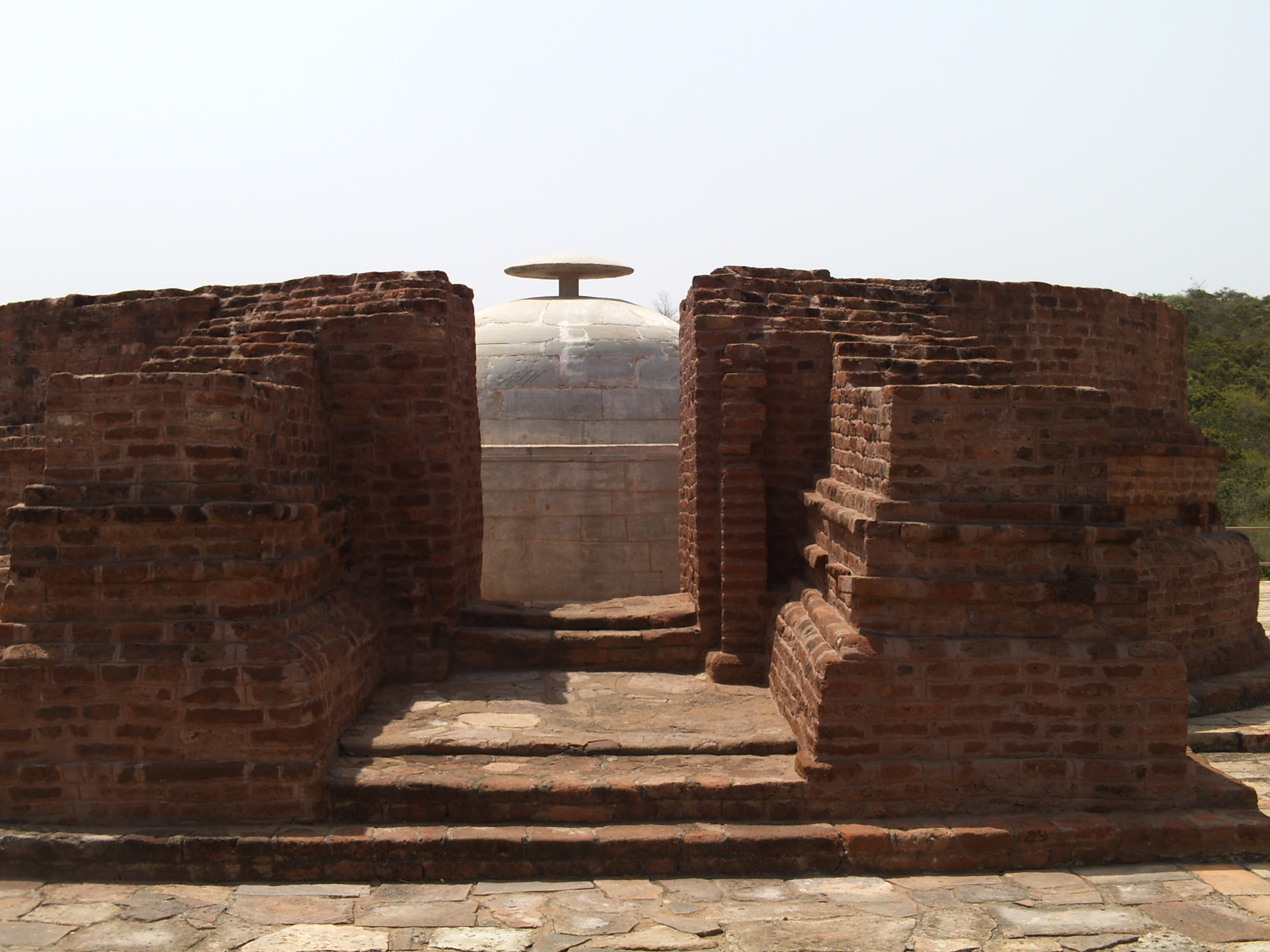
The stupa inside its building

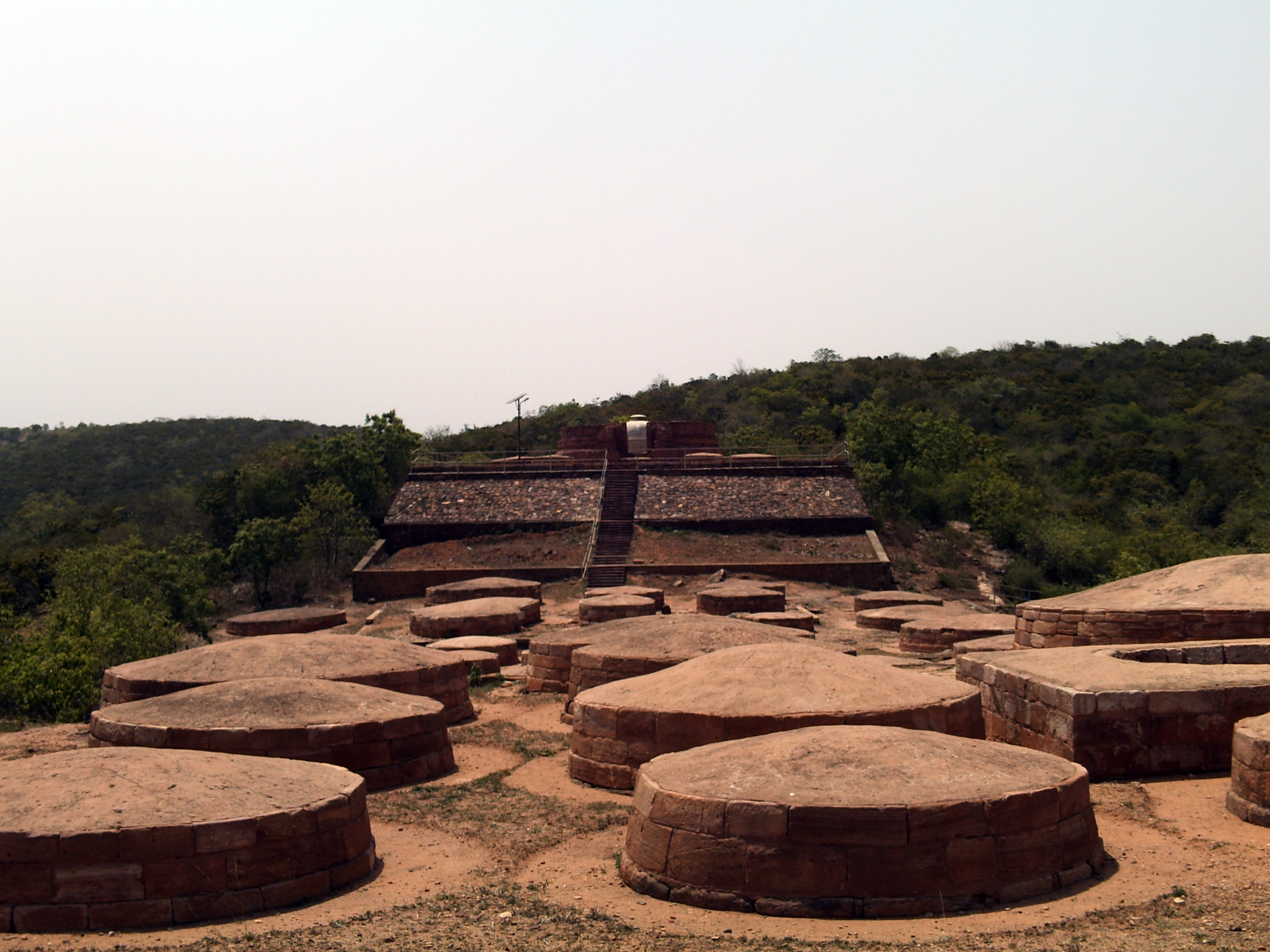
Stupa remains below the main stupa

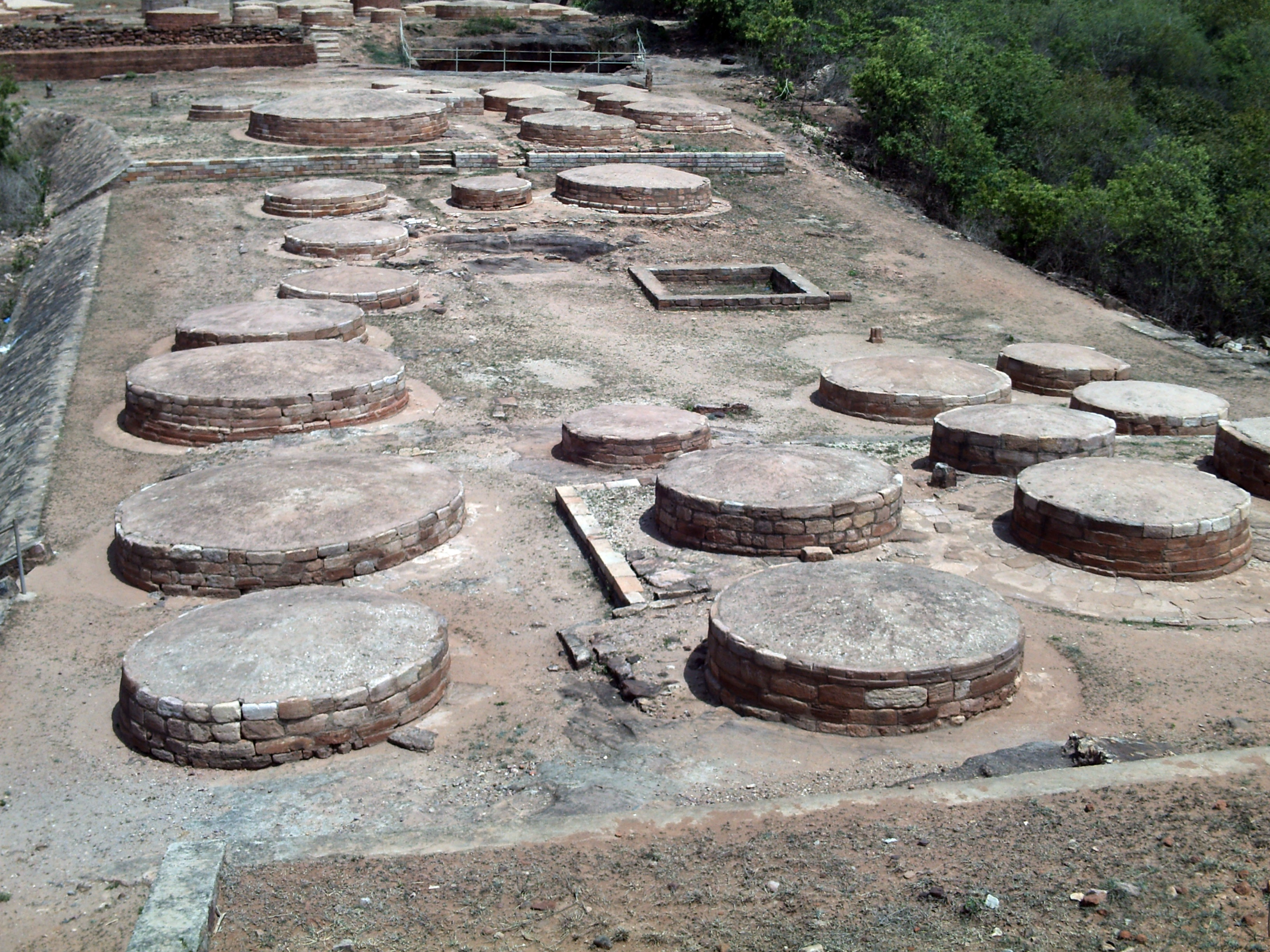
Stupas

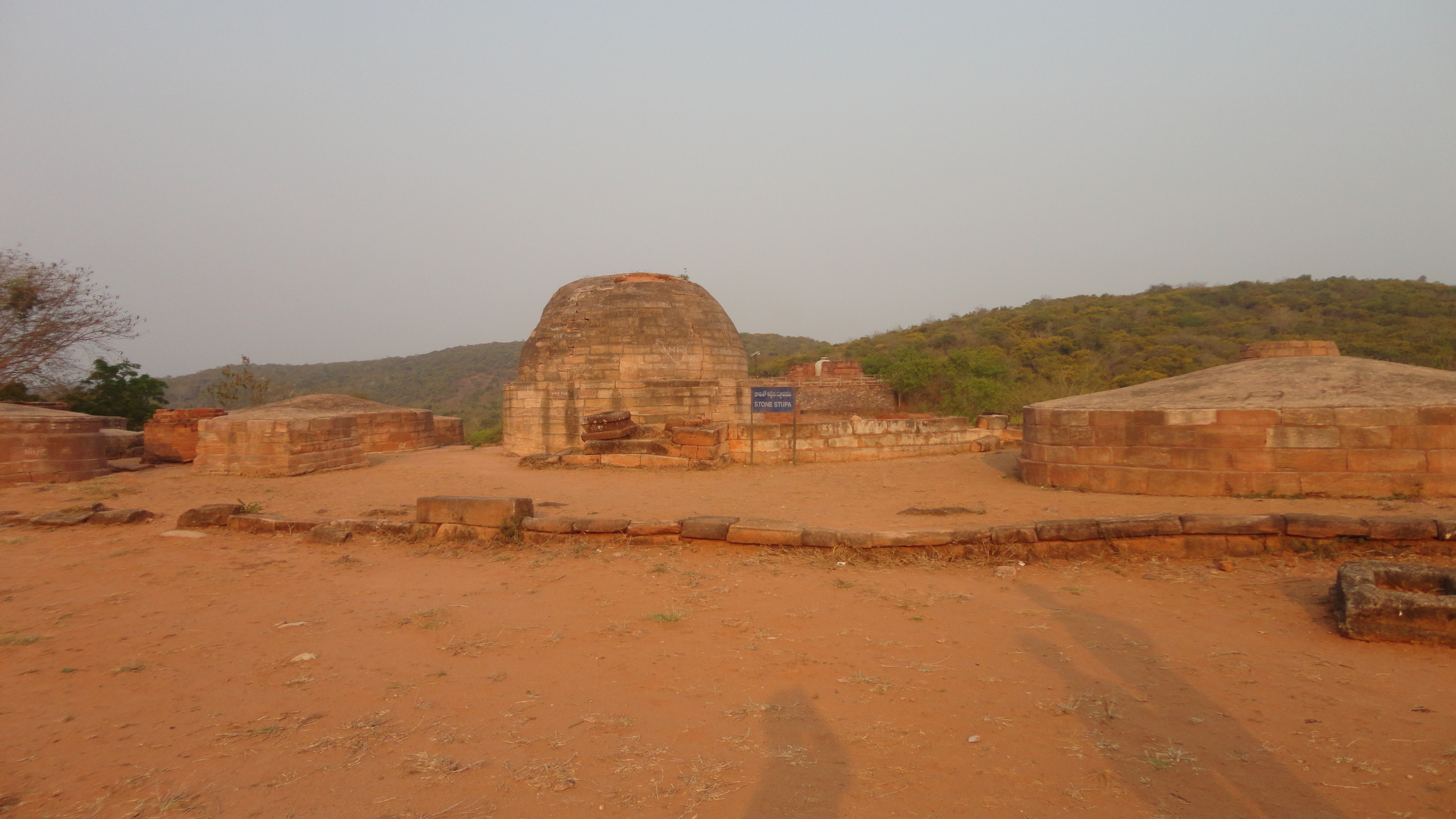
Stupas

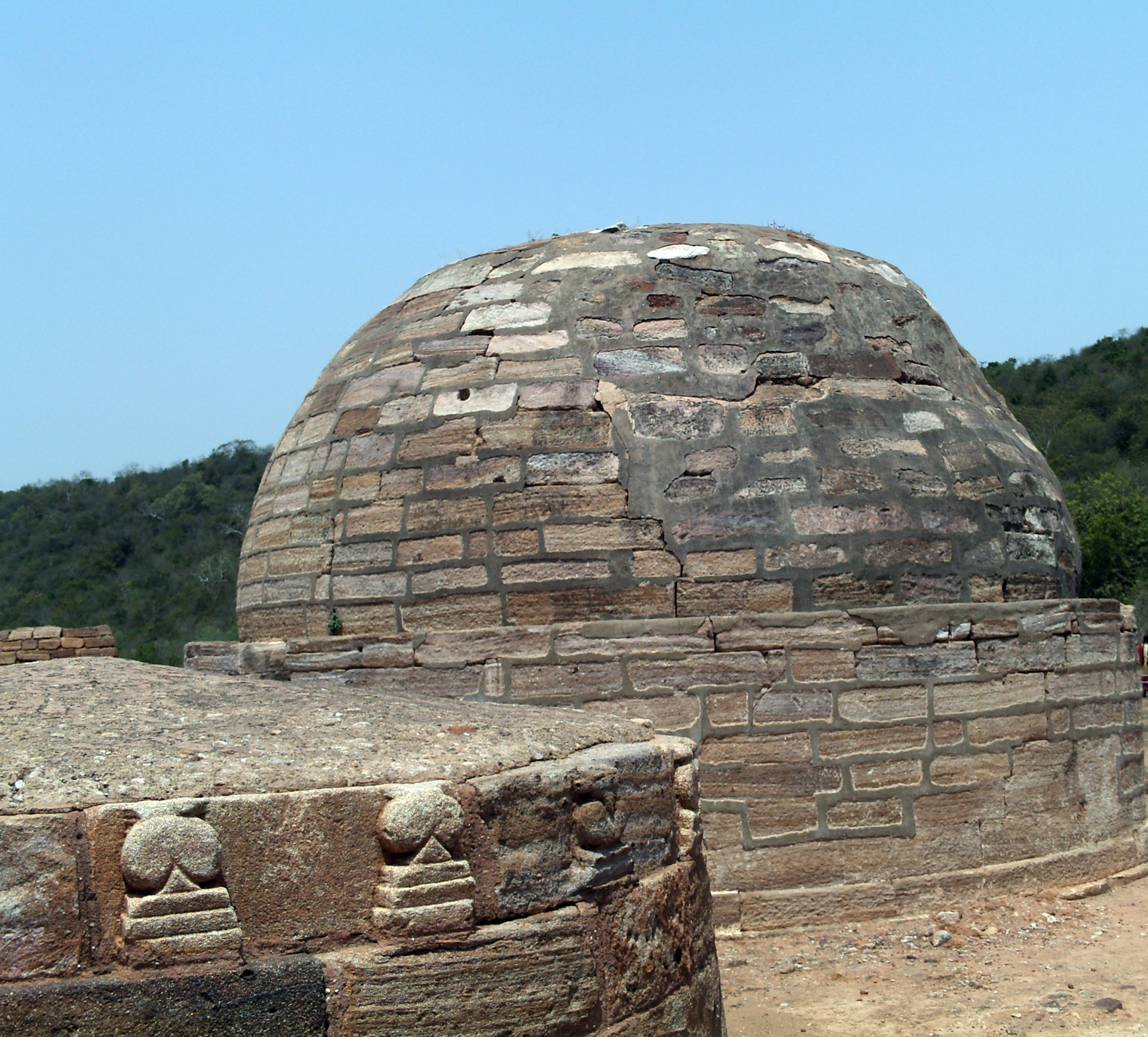

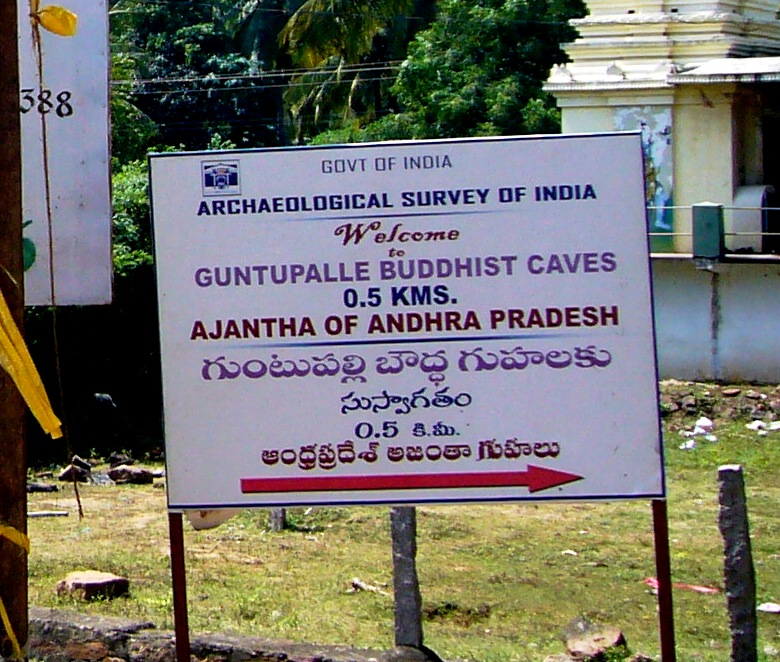
Guntupalli Buddhist caves information board
