= Palakoderu =

- Village
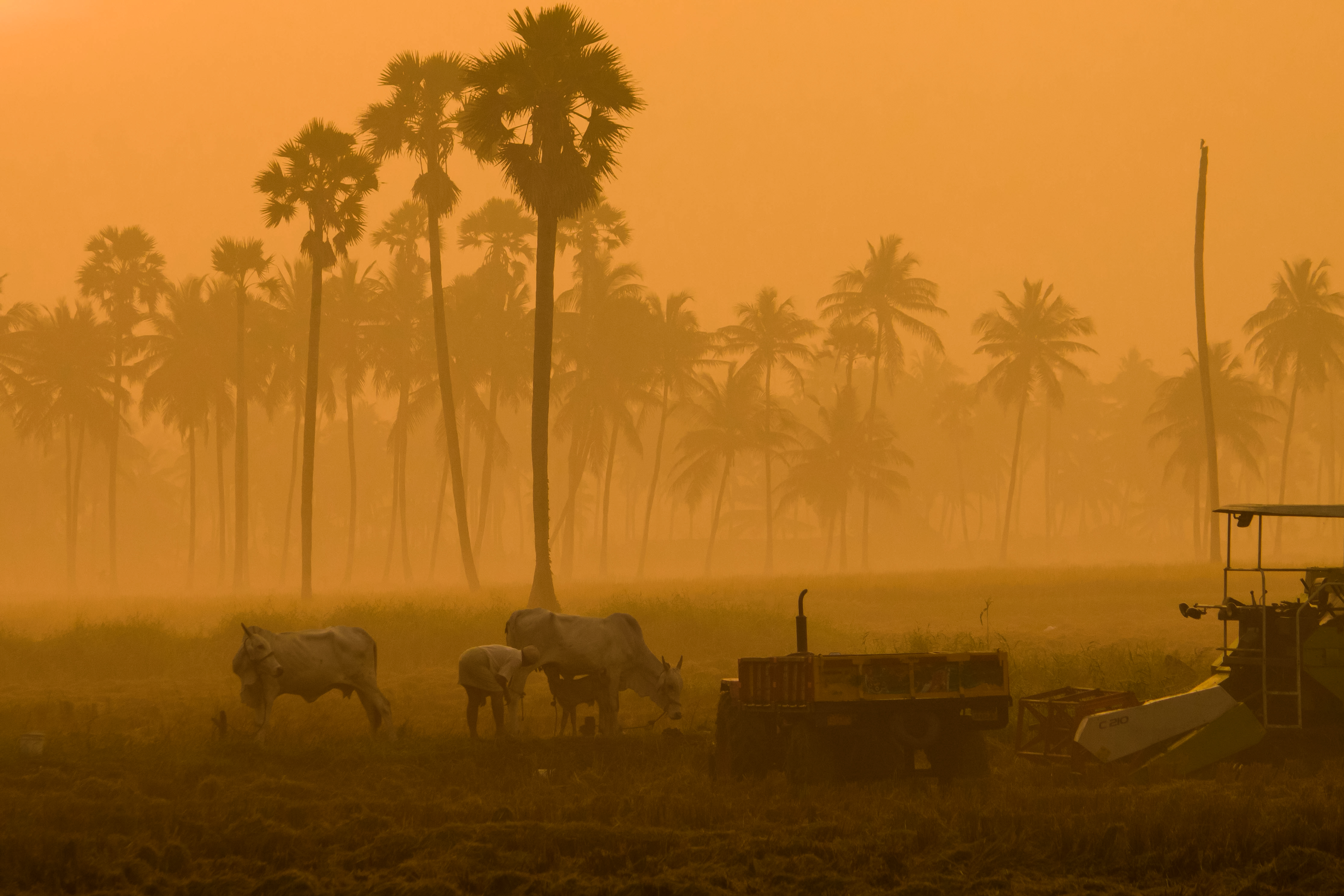
- Sunrise at Kondepudi village near Palakoderu
- Interactive map of Palakoderu
- Location in Andhra Pradesh, India Palakoderu (India)
- Coordinates: 16.586102°N 81.545953°E
- Country: India
- State: Andhra Pradesh
- District: West Godavari
- Talukas: Palakoderu

Languages
  - Official: Telugu
- Time zone: UTC+5:30 (IST)
- Vehicle registration: AP

Palakoderu is a village in West Godavari district of the Indian state of Andhra Pradesh.

== Demographics ==
As of 2011 Census of India, Palakoderu had a population of 6701. The total population constitute, 3312 males and 3389 females with a sex ratio of 1023 females per 1000 males. 601 children are in the age group of 0–6 years, with sex ratio of 908. The average literacy rate stands at 72.84%.
