= Yadavilli, Eluru district =

Coordinates: 16°57′55″N 80°57′15″E

Yadavilli
- Village
- Interactive map of Yadavilli
- Location in Andhra Pradesh, India
- Country: India
- State: Andhra Pradesh

Languages
  - Official: Telugu
- Time zone: UTC+5:30 (IST)
- Vehicle registration: AP

Ya-da-villi village is located in Eluru district of Andhra Pradesh, India.
