= Pragadavaram =

Coordinates: 17°01′N 81°01′E

- Village
- Interactive map of Pragadavaram
- Country: India
- State: Andhra Pradesh
- District: Eluru

Population (2001)
  - Total: 10,755

Languages
  - Official: Telugu
- Time zone: UTC+5:30 (IST)

Pragadavaram is a village located in Chintalapudi Mandal of West Godavari District in the state of Andhra Pradesh, India. The nearest railway station is located at Denduluru (DEL) at a distance of 31.32 km.

== Demographics ==
As of 2011 Census of India, Pragadavaram had a population of 10755. The total population constitute, 5396 males and 5359 females with a sex ratio of 993 females per 1000 males. 1022 children are in the age group of 0–6 years, with sex ratio of 977 The average literacy rate stands at 63.34%.
