= Kamavarapukota =

- Village
- Interactive map of Kamavarapukota
- Location in Andhra Pradesh, India Kamavarapukota (India)
- Coordinates: 17.00312°N 81.12192°E
- Country: India
- State: Andhra Pradesh
- District: Eluru

Population (2011)
  - Total: 16,790

Languages
  - Official: Telugu
- Time zone: UTC+5:30 (IST)
- PIN: 534 449
- Vehicle registration: AP

Kamavarapukota is a village in Eluru district of the Indian state of Andhra Pradesh. The nearest railway station is at Sitampet.

== Geography ==
Kamavarapukota lies on the Eluru–Jangareddygudem road in hilly terrain. The Kamavaraukota community includes three other villages: Kotturu, Kamavarapukota, and Pathuru. Eluru and Jangareddigudem are nearby cities. The village is only 8 kilometer distance from the famous Dwaraka Thirumala Temple.

== Demographics ==
As of the 2011 India census, Kamavarapukota had 16,790 inhabitants residing in 4,575 households. Men numbered 8,533 and women 8,257. There were 1,816 children under 6 years of age with sex ratio 932. The literacy rate of Kamavarapukota village was 72.25%.

== Culture ==
Kamavarapukota mandal is well known for tourism. Guntupalli Hills (including Kota Gattu); Dwaraka Tirumala, an ancient place of pilgrimage; and Caves of Buddha are the notable places near Kamavarapukota. The thousand year old Sree Badhrakali sahitha Veerabadhra Swamy Temple in Kota Gattu (where many age old antiques found in archeology excavations) is one of the most visited temples in the area. The annual feast of the temple is grandly celebrated in February every year. The Vali Sugriva Hill of the village contains one of the rare deity Rohini wife of Vali. Annual feast celebrated in Lunar Karthika month every year. The village occupies a very important historical place evident from the Kota Gattu (Fortress Wall).
