= T. Narasapuram =

- village
- Interactive map of T. Narasapuram
- Location in Andhra Pradesh, India T. Narasapuram (India)
- Coordinates: 17°06′13″N 81°04′41″E
- Country: India
- State: Andhra Pradesh
- District: Eluru
- Elevation: 20 m (66 ft)

Population (2011)
  - Total: 8,836

Languages
  - Official: Telugu
- Time zone: UTC+5:30 (IST)
- PIN: 534467
- Telephone code: 08823
- Vehicle registration: AP-37

T. Narasapuram is a village in Eluru district of the Indian state of Andhra Pradesh.
