= Nallajerla =

Village in Andhra Pradesh, India

- village
- Interactive map of Nallajerla
- Location in Andhra Pradesh, India
- Coordinates: 16.9500°N 81.4000°E
- Country: India
- State: Andhra Pradesh
- District: East Godavari
- Elevation: 76 m (249 ft)

Population (2011)
  - Total: 13,457

Languages
  - Official: Telugu
- Time zone: UTC+5:30 (IST)
- PIN: 534112
- Telephone code: 08818
- Vehicle registration: AP 37, 39, 40

Nallajerla is a village in East Godavari district of the Indian state of Andhra Pradesh .

== Demographics ==
As of 2011 Census of India, Nallajerla had a population of 13457. The total population constitute, 6712 males and 6745 females with a sex ratio of 1005 females per 1000 males. 1371 children are in the age group of 0–6 years, with sex ratio of 953. The average literacy rate stands at 73.99%.
