= Khandavalli =

Khandavalli Durvasapuram
- Village
- Interactive map of Khandavalli
- Location within Andhra Pradesh
- Coordinates: 16.7209964°N 81.7702425°E
- Country: India
- State: Andhra Pradesh
- District: East Godavari
- Mandal: Peravali
- Time zone: UTC+05:30 (IST)
- Pincode: 534330
- Vehicle registration: AP30 (Former) AP39 (from 30 January 2019)

Khandavalli is a village in Peravali mandal in East Godavari district, Andhra Pradesh. Postal Index Code of this village is 534330.

== Demographics ==
As of 2011 Census of India, Khandavalli had a population of 13884. The total population constitute, 6979 males and 6905 females with a sex ratio of 989 females per 1000 males. 1354 children are in the age group of 0–6 years, with sex ratio of 954. The average literacy rate stands at 69.90%.

== Transportation ==
NH216A, Spur road of NH16 passes through Khandavalli Village.

This road Connects Eluru, Gundugolanu, Bhimadole Pulla, Kaikaram, Chebrolu, Ungaturu, Tadepalligudem, Duvva, Tanuku, Siddantam, Ravulapalem, Vemagiri, Kadiyapulanka, and ends at Rajahmundry.

APSRTC Connects buses service from Eluru, Gundugolanu, Bhimadolu, Pulla, Kaikaram, Chebrolu, Ungaturu, Tadepalligudem, Duvva, Tanuku, Ravulapalem, Malleswaram, Achanta to Khandavalli village.

Autos, Cabs are also available at Khandavalli Highway junction for passengers to travel to Tanuku and other near by towns .

=== Nearest Railway Stations ===
Tanuku railway station (TNKU), Nidadavolu Junction railway station (NDD), Palakollu railway station (PKO), Narasapur railway station (NS), Tadepalligudem railway station (TDD) are the main and major nearest railway station to Khandavalli village.

== Eminent persons ==
- Famous Telugu writer Chilakamarti Lakshminarasimham was born here.
- Film Actor Mass Maharaja Ravi Teja was born here.
