= Peravali =

- Village
- Interactive map of Peravali
- Location in Andhra Pradesh, India
- Coordinates: 16.7511°N 81.7418°E
- Country: India
- State: Andhra Pradesh
- District: East Godavari

Population (2011)
  - Total: 4,000

Languages
  - Official: Telugu
- Time zone: UTC+5:30 (IST)
- Pincode: 534328
- Vehicle registration: AP30 (Former) AP39 (from 30 January 2019)

Peravali is a village in East Godavari district of the Indian state of Andhra Pradesh. The nearest railway station is Tanuku (TNKU) located at a distance of 7.25 Km. Postal index code of this village is 534328.

== Geography ==
Peravali is located at NH-16, which comes in between Raavulapalem and Tadepalligudem. Peravali Junction road had a connection to Narasapuram to Nidadavolu State Highway that intercepts NH-16.

This village is also famous for Soil Testing & Soil Investigation by Saladi family. They started in the 1970s in Peravali & All Over in Andhra Pradesh. This mandal is now part of Nidadavole Assembly constituency from the Demlimitation order 2008., but was previously part of Achanta Assembly Constituency.

== Demographics ==
As of 2011 Census of India, Peravali had a population of 5744. The total population constitute, 2838 males and 2906 females with a sex ratio of 1024 females per 1000 males. 581 children are in the age group of 0–6 years, with sex ratio of 969. The average literacy rate stands at 71.18%.

== Transportation ==
NH216A, Spur road of NH16 passes through Peravali Village.

This road Connects Eluru, Gundugolanu, Bhimadole Pulla, Kaikaram, Chebrolu, Ungaturu, Tadepalligudem, Duvva, Tanuku, Siddantam, Ravulapalem, Vemagiri, Kadiyapulanka, and ends at Rajahmundry.

APSRTC Connects buses service from Eluru, Gundugolanu, Bhimadolu, Pulla, Kaikaram, Chebrolu, Ungaturu, Tadepalligudem, Duvva, Tanuku, Ravulapalem, Malleswaram, Achanta Penugonda, Narsapuram, Nidadavolu, Rajahmundry to Peravali village.

=== Nearest railway stations ===
Tanuku railway station (TNKU), Nidadavolu Junction railway station (NDD), Palakollu railway station (PKO), Narasapur railway station (NS), Tadepalligudem railway station (TDD) are the nearest railway station to Peravali village.
