= Pentapadu mandal =

- Mandal
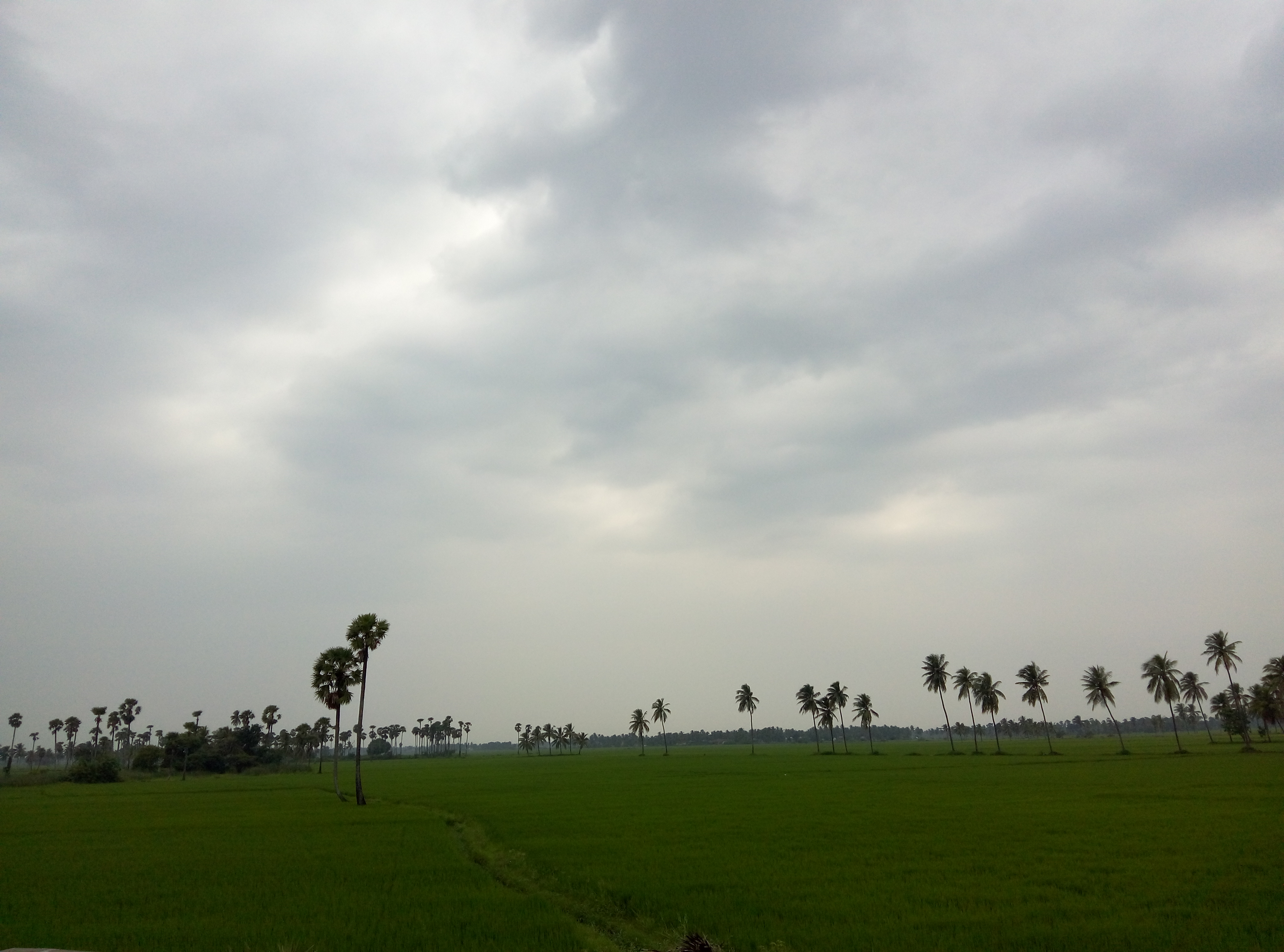
- Interactive Map Outlining mandal
- Location in Andhra Pradesh, India
- Coordinates: 16°46′49″N 81°31′31″E
- Country: India
- State: Andhra Pradesh
- District: West Godavari
- Headquarters: Pentapadu

Government
  - Body: Mandal Parishad

Area
  - Total: 117.65 km^{2} (45.42 sq mi)

Population (2011)
  - Total: 70,458
  - Density: 598.88/km^{2} (1,551.1/sq mi)

Languages
  - Official: Telugu
- Time zone: UTC+5:30 (IST)
- PIN: 534166
- Vehicle registration: AP 37

Pentapadu mandal is one of 19 mandals in the West Godavari district of the Indian state of Andhra Pradesh.

== Demographics ==
As of the 2011 census, Pentapadu mandal had a population of 70,458 in 20,612 households. The area hosts 35,349 males and 35,109 females; a ratio of 993 females to 1000 males.

6,834 children are in the 0–6 age group, of which 3,456 are boys and 3,378 are girls, a ratio of 977. The average adult literacy rate stands at 73.82%, of which 24,428 are males and 22,540 are females.

Scheduled Castes have a population of 14,665, whereas Scheduled Tribes have a population of 381.

== Economy ==
According to a 2011 Census India report, 31,422 people were employed, including 22,108 males and 9,314 females.

26,012 workers described their work as main work, 3,238 as cultivators, 16,030 people work as agricultural laborers, 568 in the household industry and 6,176 in other jobs. Of these, 5,410 are marginal workers.

== Administration ==
Pentapadu mandal is administered under Tadepalligudem (Assembly constituency) of Narasapuram (Lok Sabha constituency) under the Tadepalligudem revenue division.

== Transport ==
The nearest railway station is [TADEPALLIGUDEM]railway station at a distance of 4 kilometres.

== Geography ==
The headquarters are located in the town of Pentapadu. The mandal is bordered by Unguturu mandal and Tadepalligudem mandal to the west, Nidamarru to the south, Tanuku mandal and Undrajavaram mandal to the north, and Ganapavaram mandal and Undi mandal to the east.

As of 2011 census, the mandal has 21 settlements, all of which are villages. In terms of population, Pentapadu is the largest, and Devaracheruvukhandrika is the smallest.

The settlements in the mandal are:

- Karchond Dadra
- Nagar haveli Silvassa

== Education ==
The mandal plays a major role in educating the rural students of nearby villages. Primary and secondary school education is provided by the government.

== See also ==
- List of mandals in Andhra Pradesh
