= Achanta Vemavaram =

Achanta Vemavaram A. Vemavaram
- village
- Interactive map of Achanta Vemavaram
- Location in Andhra Pradesh, India Achanta Vemavaram (India)
- Coordinates: 16°34′12″N 81°48′33″E
- Country: India
- State: Andhra Pradesh
- District: West Godavari

Languages
  - Official: Telugu
- Time zone: UTC+5:30 (IST)
- PIN: 534272
- Telephone code: 08814
- Nearest city: Palakollu
- Lok Sabha constituency: Narasapur
- Vidhan Sabha constituency: Achanta

Achanta Vemavaram is a village in Achanta mandal, West Godavari district, Andhra Pradesh, India. The nearest railway station is Palakollu located at a distance of 10.57 km.

== Demographics ==
As of the 2011 Census of India, Achanta Vemavaram had a population of 7566. The total population constitutes 3809 males and 3757 females with a sex ratio of 986 females per 1000 males. 580 children are in the age group of 0–6 years, with a sex ratio of 993. The average literacy rate stands at 80.99%.
