= Prattipadu railway station =

Railway station in Andhra Pradesh, India

Prattipadu

General information
- Location: Prattipadu, West Godavari district, Andhra Pradesh; India
- Coordinates: 16°49′06″N 81°34′30″E
- Elevation: 17 m (56 ft)
- System: Passenger train station
- Owner: Indian Railways
- Operator: South Central Railway zone
- Line: Visakhapatnam–Vijayawada section of Howrah–Chennai main line and
- Platforms: 2
- Tracks: 2 1,676 mm (5 ft 6 in)

Construction
- Structure type: Standard (on-ground station)
- Parking: Available

Other information
- Status: Closed
- Station code: PTPU
- Zone(s): South Central Railway zone
- Division(s): Vijayawada

History
- Opened: 1896
- Electrified: 25 kV AC 50 Hz OHLE
Location
- Location within India Location within Andhra Pradesh

Prattipadu is a defunct Indian Railways station near Prattipadu, a village in Pentapadu mandal West Godavari district of Andhra Pradesh. It lies on the Vijayawada–Chennai section and is administered under Vijayawada railway division of South Central Railway zone. No train halts in this station every day.

== History ==
Between 1893 and 1896, 1,288 km (800 mi) of the East Coast State Railway, between Vijayawada and PTPUttack was opened for traffic. The southern part of the West Coast State Railway (from Waltair to Vijayawada) was taken over by Madras Railway in 1901.

| Preceding station | Indian Railways | Following station |
|---|---|---|
| Navabpalem towards ? | South Central Railway zone Visakhapatnam–Vijayawada section of Howrah–Chennai main line | Tadepalligudem towards ? |
