= Unguturu railway station =

Railway station in Andhra Pradesh, India

Unguturu
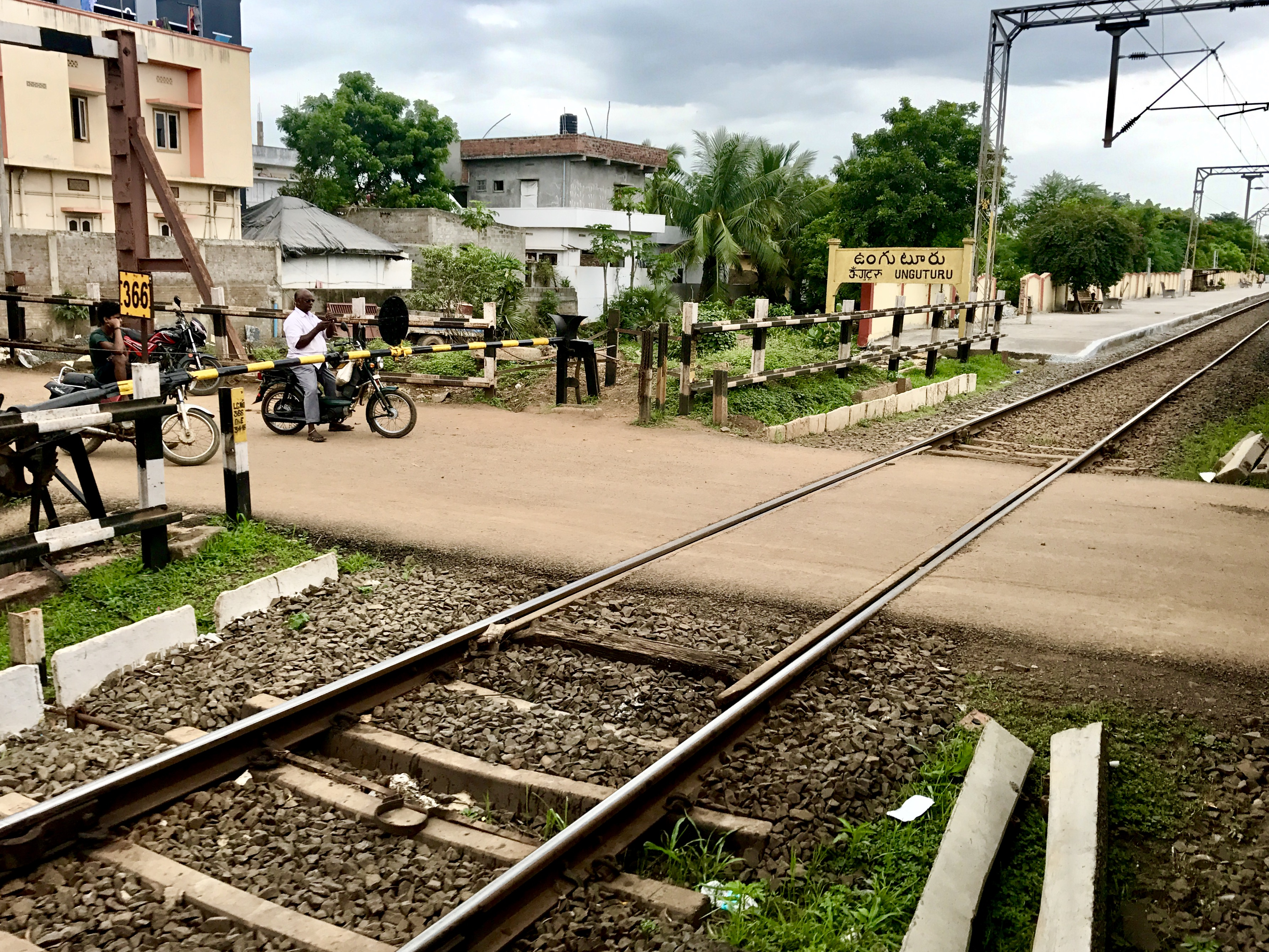

General information
- Location: Unguturu, West Godavari district, Andhra Pradesh; India
- Coordinates: 16°49′28″N 81°25′24″E
- Elevation: 18 m (59 ft)
- System: Indian Railways station
- Owner: Indian Railways
- Operator: South Central Railway
- Line: Visakhapatnam–Vijayawada section of Howrah–Chennai main line
- Platforms: 2 side platforms are gravel
- Tracks: 2 5 ft 6 in (1,676 mm) broad gauge

Construction
- Structure type: Standard (on ground station)
- Parking: Not available

Other information
- Status: Active
- Station code: VGT
- Division(s): Vijayawada

History
- Opened: 1893–96
- Electrified: 1995–96
Location
- Location within Andhra Pradesh Location within India
- Interactive map

Unguturu railway station (station code:VGT), is an Indian Railways station in Unguturu town of Andhra Pradesh. It lies on the Vijayawada–visakhapatnam main line of Howrah–Chennai main line and is administered under Vijayawada railway division of South Central Railway zone. Nine trains halt at the station each day.

== History ==
Between 1893 and 1896, 1,288 km (800 mi) of the East Coast State Railway, between Vijayawada and Cuttack, was opened for traffic. The southern part of the East Coast State Railway (from Waltair to Vijayawada) was taken over by Madras Railway in 1901.

Preceding station	Indian Railways	Following station
Badampudi towards ?	South Central Railway zone Visakhapatnam–Vijayawada section of Howrah–Chennai main line	Chebrol towards ?
