= Tanuku mandal =

- Mandal
- Interactive Map Outlining mandal
- Location in Andhra Pradesh, India
- Coordinates: 16.75°N 81.7°E
- Country: India
- State: Andhra Pradesh
- District: West Godavari
- Headquarters: Tanuku

Government
  - Body: Mandal Parishad

Area
  - Total: 16.78 km^{2} (6.48 sq mi)

Population (2011)
  - Total: 77,962
  - Density: 4,646/km^{2} (12,030/sq mi)

Languages
  - Official: Telugu
- Time zone: UTC+5:30 (IST)

Tanuku mandal is one of the 48 mandals in West Godavari district of the Indian state of Andhra Pradesh. It is under the administration of Tadepalligudem revenue division and the headquarters are located at Tanuku. The mandal is bounded by Iragavaram, Nallajerla, Devarapalle, Nidadavolu, Unguturu, Pentapadu, Tanuku and Undrajavaram mandals.

== Towns and villages ==
As of 2011 census of India, the mandal has 9 settlements, which includes 1 town, an out growth and 8 villages. Tanuku (M) is the only town in the mandal.

The settlements in the mandal are listed below:

1. Duvva
2. Komaravaram
3. Konala
4. Mandapaka (OG) (Part)
5. Mandapaka (Part)
6. Muddapuram
7. Tanuku (M)
8. Tetali
9. Velpur

Notes
(M) denotes a Municipality
(OG) denotes an Out Growth

== See also ==
- List of mandals in Andhra Pradesh
