= Badampudi railway station =

Railway station in Andhra Pradesh, India

Badampudi
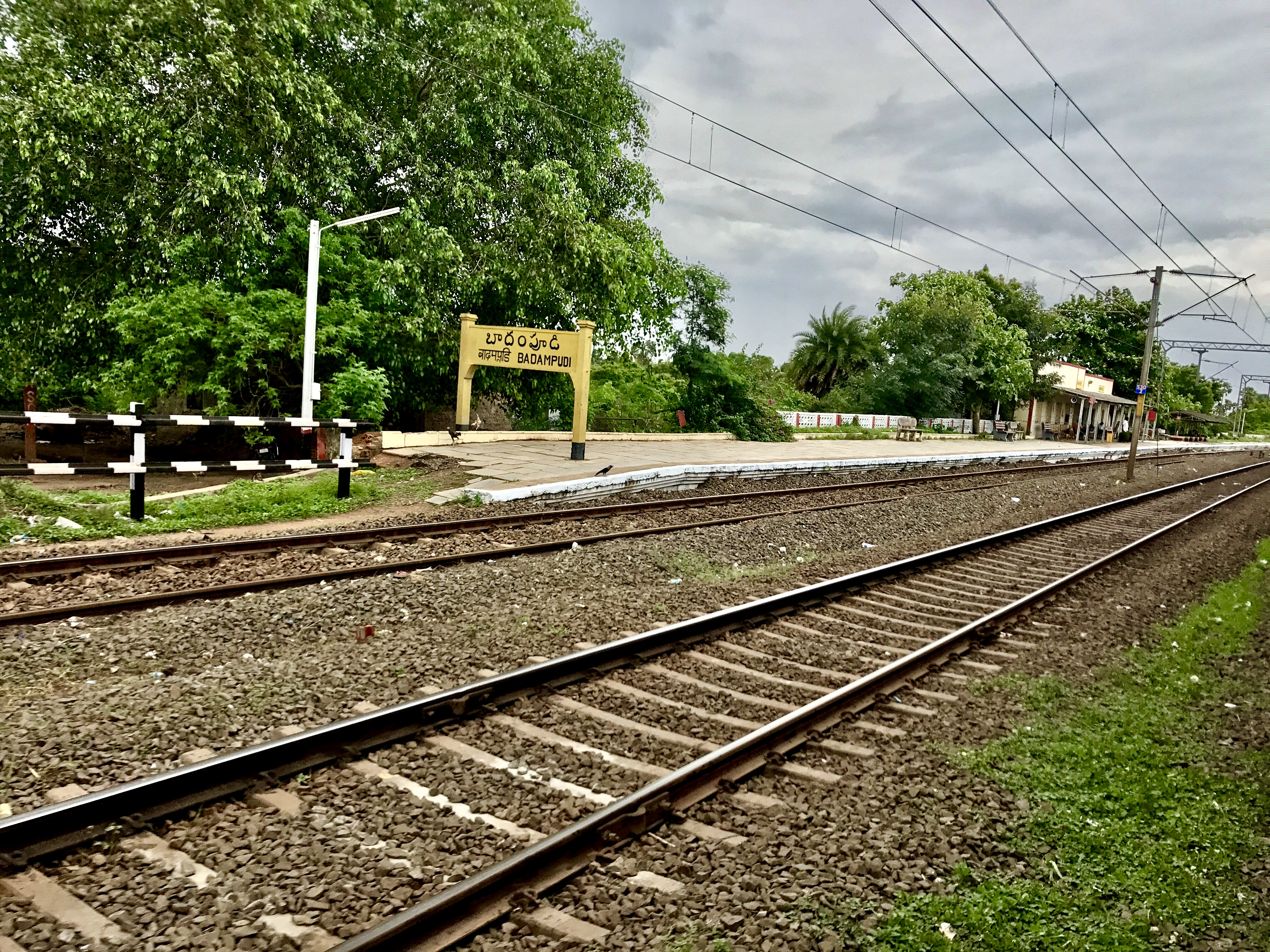

General information
- Location: Badampudi, Eluru district, Andhra Pradesh; India
- Coordinates: 16°49′41″N 81°28′26″E
- Elevation: 18 m (59 ft)
- System: Indian Railways station
- Owner: Indian Railways
- Operator: South Coast Railway zone
- Line: Visakhapatnam–Vijayawada section of Howrah–Chennai main line
- Platforms: 2 side platforms are gravel
- Tracks: 2 5 ft 6 in (1,676 mm) broad gauge

Construction
- Structure type: Standard (on-ground station)
- Parking: Not available

Other information
- Status: Active
- Station code: BPY
- Division(s): Vijayawada

History
- Opened: 1893–96
- Electrified: 1995–96

Services
Preceding station	Indian Railways	Following station
Tadepalligudem towards ?	South Coast Railway zone Visakhapatnam–Vijayawada section of Howrah–Chennai main line	Unguturu towards ?
Location
- Location within Andhra Pradesh Location within India
- Interactive map

Badampudi railway station (station code:BPY), is an Indian Railways station in Badampudi village of Andhra Pradesh. It is located in Pulla village. It lies on the Vijayawada–Nidadavolu loop line of Howrah–Chennai main line and is administered under Vijayawada railway division of South Coast Railway zone. It halts for 10 trains every day.

== History ==
Between 1893 and 1896, 1,288 km (800 mi) of the East Coast State Railway, between Vijayawada and Cuttack, was opened for traffic. The southern part of the East Coast State Railway (from Waltair to Vijayawada) was taken over by Madras Railway in 1901.

== Classification ==
In terms of earnings and outward passengers handled, Badampudi is categorized as a Non-Suburban Grade-6 (NSG-6) railway station. Based on the re–categorization of Indian Railway stations for the period of 2017–18 and 2022–23, an NSG–6 category station earns nearly ₹1 crore and handles close to 1 million passengers.
