= Badampudi =

- Village
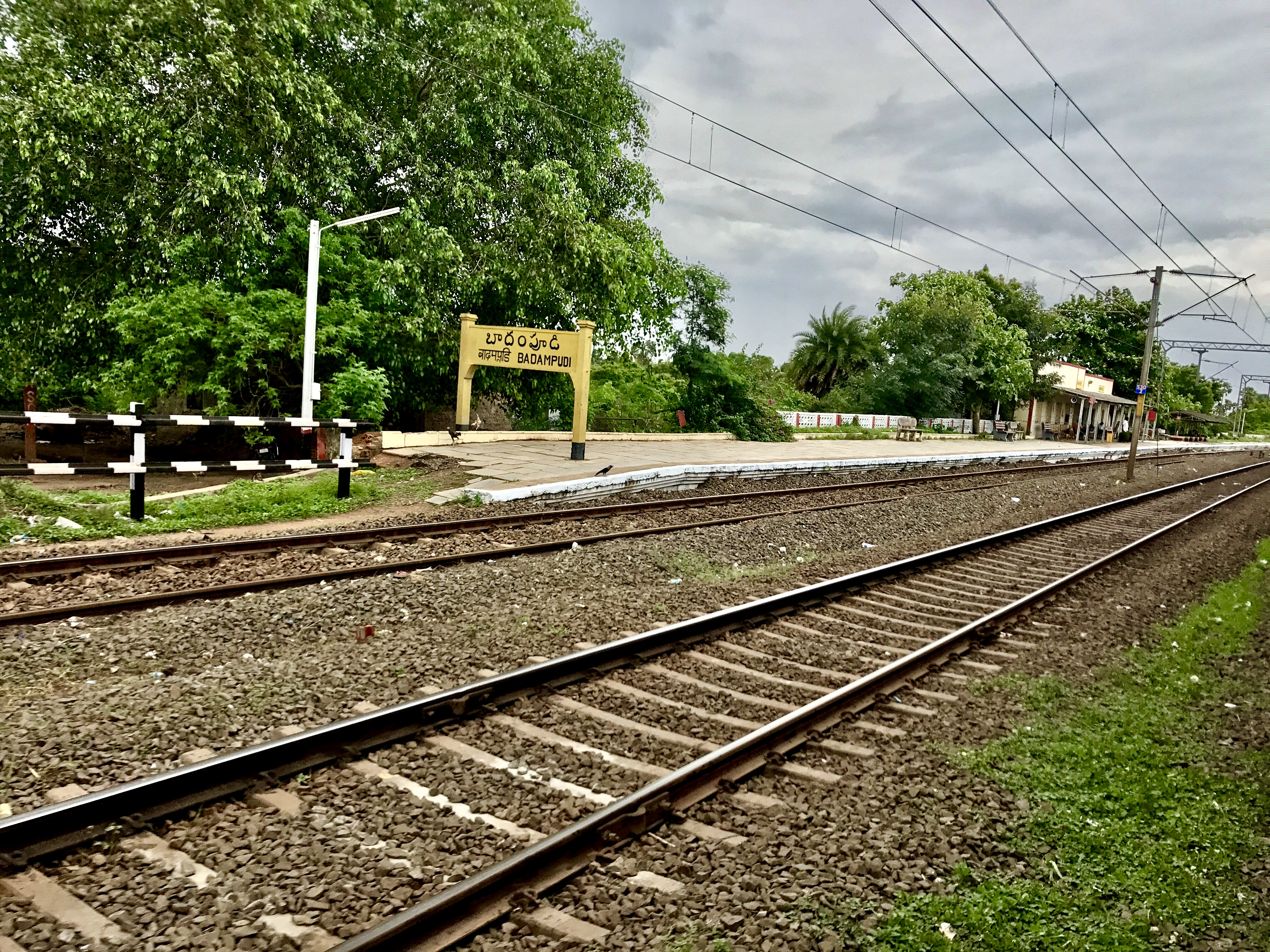
- Badampudi railway station signboard
- Interactive map of Badampudi
- Location in Andhra Pradesh, India Badampudi (India)
- Coordinates: 16.82°N 81.47°E
- Country: India
- State: Andhra Pradesh
- District: Eluru

Population (2011)
  - Total: 6,654

Languages
  - Official: Telugu
- Time zone: UTC+5:30 (IST)
- PIN: 534411
- Telephone code: 08818
- Vehicle registration: AP-37

Badampudi is a village in Unguturu mandal, located in Eluru district of the Indian state of Andhra Pradesh. Badampudi has an excellent road and rail connectivity to the all major cities of India. Badampudi has a famous Kalikrishna ashram which attracts pilgrims from all other states during winter season.

Badampudi has produced many talents to the nation working in India and abroad at various positions. ZPH School Badampudi which is there since 1975 has produced numerous Engineers, Doctors, Teachers, Army Professionals and politicians. Badampudi - BPY has its own railway station.

== Demographics ==
As of 2011 census, Badampudi village has population of 6654 of which 3350 are males while 3304 are females. Average Sex Ratio of Badampudi village is 986 which is lower than Andhra Pradesh state average of 993. Population of children with age 0-6 is 708 which makes up 10.64% of total population of village. Child Sex Ratio for the Badampudi as per census is 1017, higher than Andhra Pradesh average of 939. Literacy rate of Badampudi village was 71.78% compared to 67.02% of Andhra Pradesh.
