= Valluru, Achanta mandal =

Valluru valluru
- village
- Interactive map of Valluru
- Location of Achanta mandal in Andhra Pradesh, India
- Coordinates: 16.557555°N 81.830305°E
- Country: India
- State: Andhra Pradesh
- District: West Godavari
- Mandal: Achanta
- Founder: valluri narasimhamurthy gaaru, hari varu

Population (2011)
  - Total: 18,962

Languages
  - Official: Telugu
- Time zone: UTC+5:30 (IST)
- PIN: 534 269
- Telephone code: 08812
- Nearest city: Palakollu

Valluru is a village in West Godavari district in the state of Andhra Pradesh in India. 14 villages are under it (Uttarapalem, Bandivaari Palem, Mattaparthivaari Palem, Pecchettivaari Palem (Bezawadavaari Palem), Seelamvaari Palem, Kasaanivaari Plem, Geddadavaari Palem, Gubbalavaari Palem, Mamidisettivaari Palem, Neerulli Palem, Kambotla Palem, Maadhasuvaari Palem, Valluru Thota, Eetakotavaari Palem).

== Demographics ==
As of 2011 India census, Valluru has a population of 18962 of which 9483 are males while 9479 are females. The average sex ratio of Valluru village is 999. The child population is 802, which makes up 8.95% of the total population of the village, with sex ratio 1133. In 2011, the literacy rate of Valluru village was 76.97% when compared to 67.02% of Andhra Pradesh.

== See also ==
- West Godavari district
