= Jagannadhapuram, Tadepalligudem mandal =

Jagannadhapuram
- Village
- Interactive map of Jagannadhapuram
- Location in Andhra Pradesh, India
- Coordinates: 16°51′19″N 81°36′40″E
- Country: India
- State: Andhra Pradesh
- District: West Godavari
- Mandal: Tadepalligudem

Area
  - Total: 17.34 km^{2} (6.70 sq mi)
- Elevation: 8 m (26 ft)

Population (2011)
  - Total: 7,862
  - Density: 453.4/km^{2} (1,174/sq mi)

Languages
  - Official: Telugu
- Time zone: UTC+5:30 (IST)

Jagannadhapuram is a village in West Godavari district of the Indian state of Andhra Pradesh. It is located in Tadepalligudem mandal.

== Demographics ==
As of 2011 Census of India, Jagannadhapuram had a population of 7862. The total population constitute, 3898 males and 3964 females with a sex ratio of 1017 females per 1000 males. 804 children are in the age group of 0–6 years, with sex ratio of 975. The average literacy rate stands at 68.18%.
