= Kandaravalli =

- village
- Interactive map of Kandaravalli
- Location of Achanta mandal in Andhra Pradesh, India Kandaravalli (India)
- Coordinates: 16.57689°N 81.841847°E
- Country: India
- State: Andhra Pradesh
- District: West Godavari
- Mandal: Achanta

Population (2011)
  - Total: 1,049

Languages
  - Official: Telugu
- Time zone: UTC+5:30 (IST)
- PIN: 534 269
- Telephone code: 08812
- Nearest city: Palakollu

Kandaravalli is a village in West Godavari district in the state of Andhra Pradesh in India. The nearest railway station is located at Palacole which is more than 10 Km from Kandaravalli.

== Demographics ==
As of 2011 India census, Kandaravalli has a population of 1049 of which 556 are males while 493 are females. The average sex ratio of Kandaravalli village is 887. The child population is 111, which makes up 10.58% of the total population of the village, with sex ratio 790. In 2011, the literacy rate of Kandaravalli village was 75.59% when compared to 67.02% of Andhra Pradesh.

== See also ==
- West Godavari district
