= Kodamanchili =

Kodamanchili previous name kadamanchili
- village
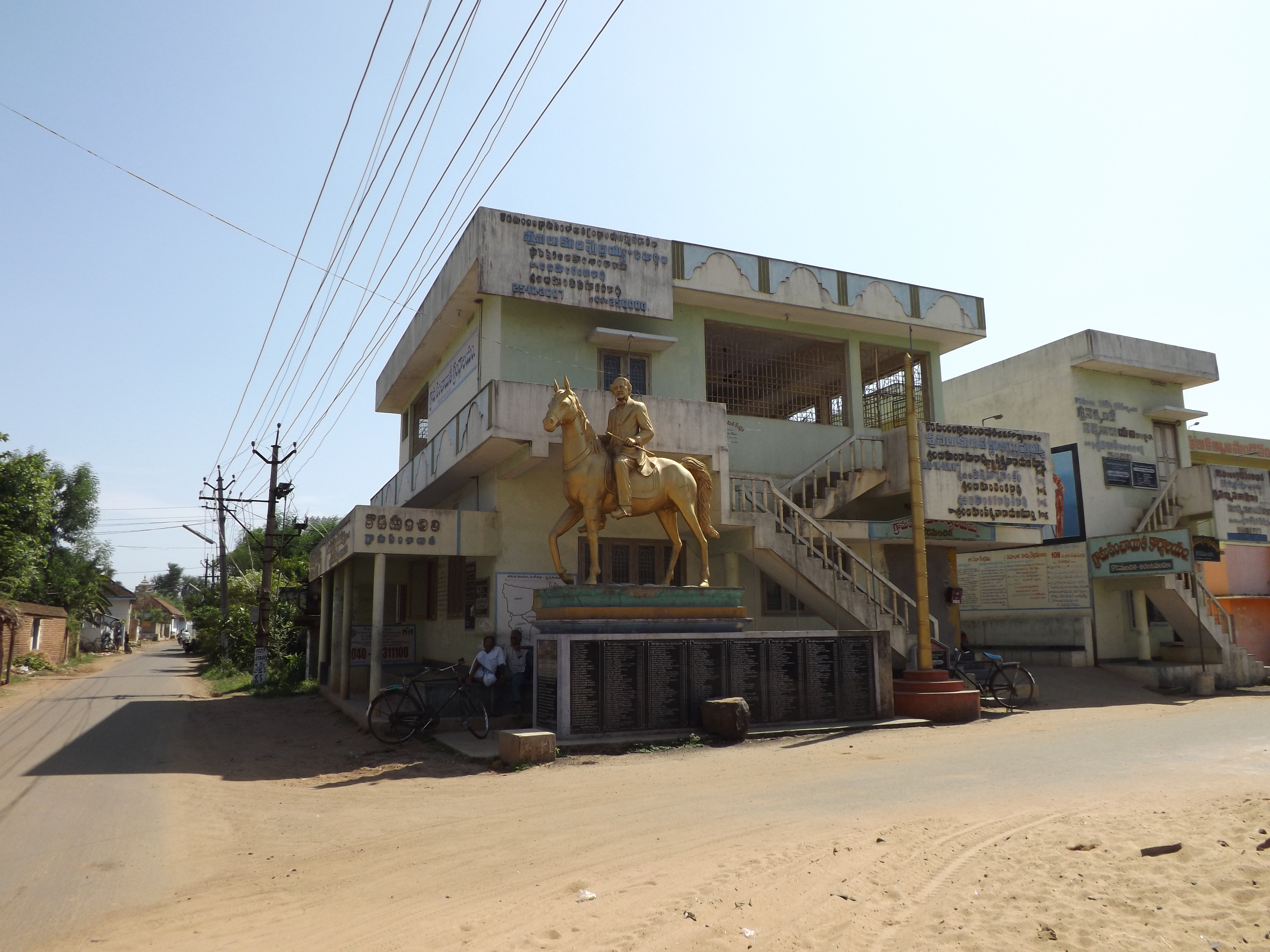
- Village hall
- Interactive map of Kodamanchili
- Location of Achanta mandal in Andhra Pradesh, India Kodamanchili (India)
- Coordinates: 16.60516°N 81.833435°E
- Country: India
- State: Andhra Pradesh
- District: West Godavari
- Mandal: Achanta

Population (2011)
  - Total: 6,151

Languages
  - Official: Telugu
- Time zone: UTC+5:30 (IST)
- PIN: 534 269
- Telephone code: 08812
- Nearest city: Palakollu

Kodamanchili is a village in West Godavari district in the state of Andhra Pradesh in India. The nearest railway station is Palakollu (PKO) located a distance of 15.45 Km.

== Demographics ==
As of 2011 India census, Kodamanchili has a population of 6151 of which 3139 are males while 3012 are females. The average sex ratio of Kodamanchili village is 960. The child population is 609, which makes up 9.90% of the total population of the village, with sex ratio 1057. In 2011, the literacy rate of Kodamanchili village was 77.86% when compared to 67.02% of Andhra Pradesh.

== Archaeology ==
23rd Tirthankara Sri Nageswara Parsvanath statue was found in this village. Jain Mandir was constructed with the idol of 23rd Tirthankara Sri Nageswara Parsvanath.

== See also ==
- West Godavari district
- Andhra Pradesh
