= Tadepalligudem revenue division =

Administrative division in Andhra Pradesh, India

- Revenue division in West Godavari district
- Country: India
- State: Andhra Pradesh
- District: West Godavari
- Formed: 9 May 2023
- Founder: Government of Andhra Pradesh
- Headquarters: Tadepalligudem
- Time zone: UTC+05:30 (IST)

Tadepalligudem revenue division is an administrative division in the West Godavari district of the Indian state of Andhra Pradesh. It is one of the 3 Revenue Divisions in the district with 5 mandals under its administration with headquarters at Tadepalligudem.

== Administration ==
The mandals in the division are given below.

1. Attili
2. Iragavaram
3. Pentapadu
4. Tadepalligudem
5. Tanuku

== See also ==
- List of revenue divisions in Andhra Pradesh
- List of mandals in Andhra Pradesh
