= Karugorumilli =

- village
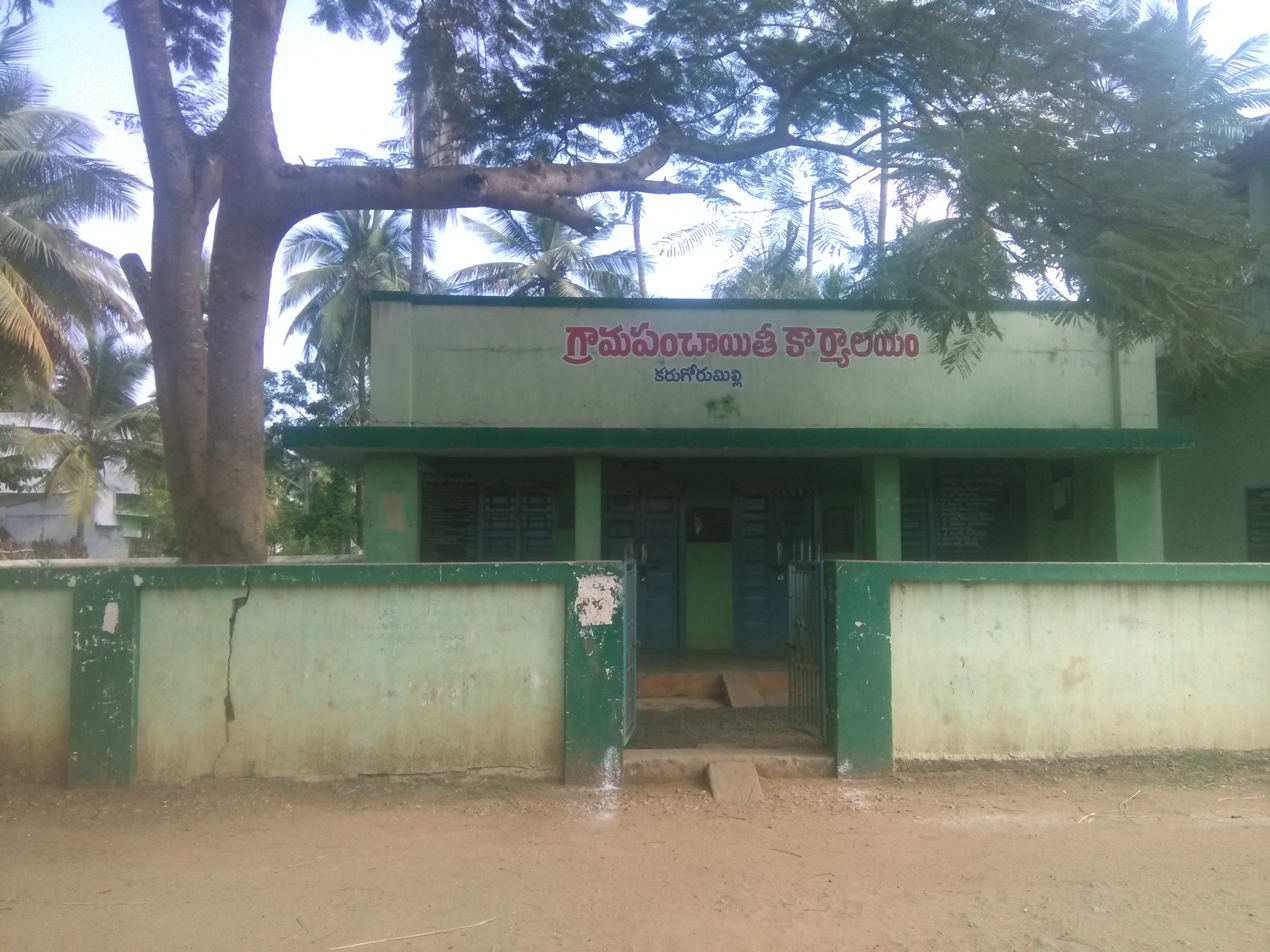
- Village hall
- Interactive map of Karugorumilli
- Location of Achanta mandal in Andhra Pradesh, India Karugorumilli (India)
- Coordinates: 16.572315°N 81.842030°E
- Country: India
- State: Andhra Pradesh
- District: West Godavari
- Mandal: Achanta

Population (2011)
  - Total: 3,243

Languages
  - Official: Telugu
- Time zone: UTC+5:30 (IST)
- PIN: 534 269
- Telephone code: 08812
- Nearest city: Palakollu

Karugorumilli is a village in West Godavari district in the state of Andhra Pradesh in India. The nearest railway station is located in town of Palacole.

== Demographics ==
As of 2011 India census, Karugorumilli has a population of 3243 of which 1647 are males while 1596 are females. The average sex ratio of Karugorumilli village is 969. The child population is 312, which makes up 9.62% of the total population of the village, with sex ratio 975. In 2011, the literacy rate of Karugorumilli village was 81.99% when compared to 67.02% of Andhra Pradesh.

== See also ==
- West Godavari district
