= Penumanchili =

- village
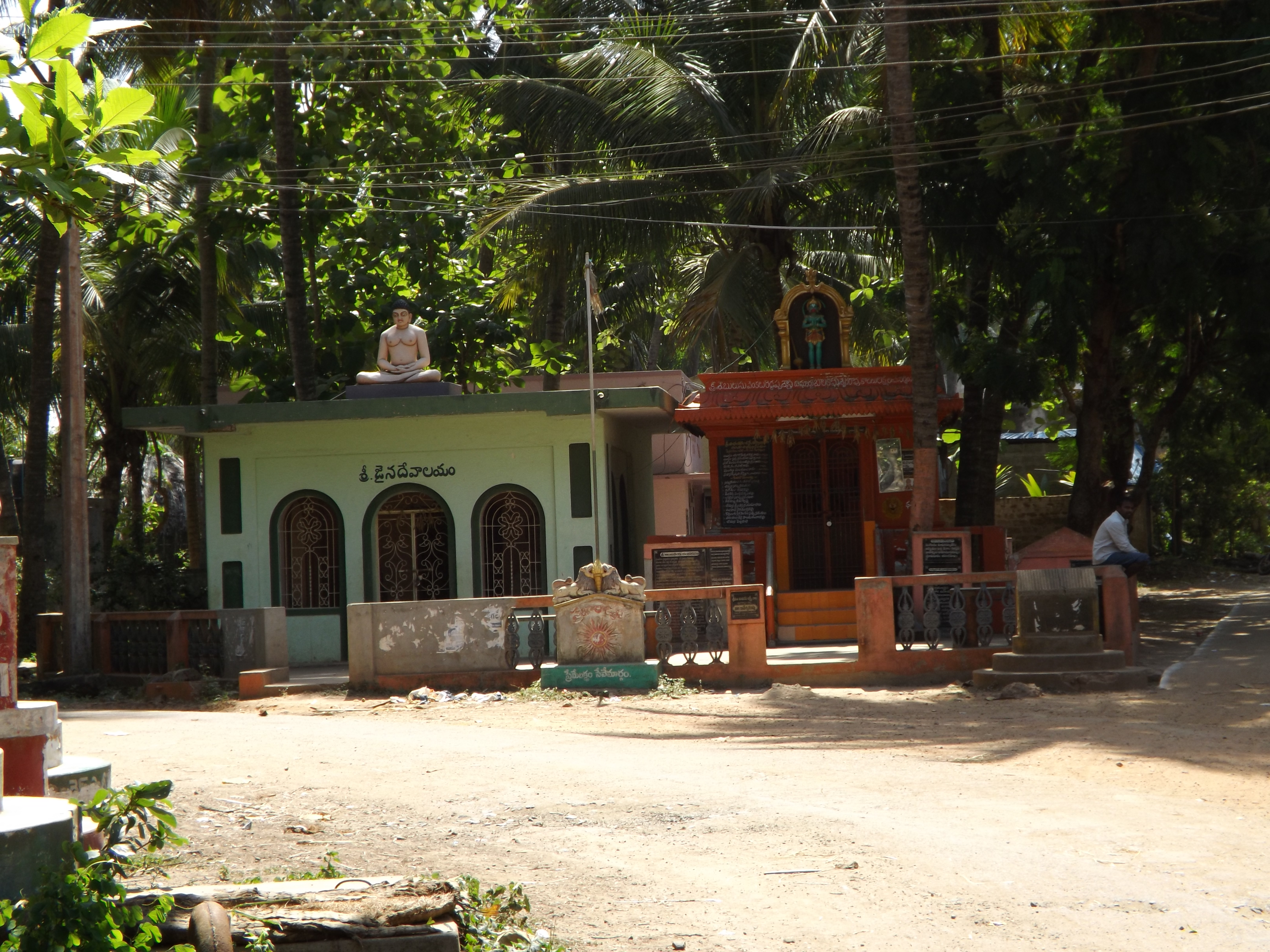
- Interactive map of Penumanchili
- Location of Achanta mandal in Andhra Pradesh, India Penumanchili (India)
- Coordinates: 16.585818°N 81.823762°E
- Country: India
- State: Andhra Pradesh
- District: West Godavari
- Mandal: Achanta

Population (2011)
  - Total: 3,924

Languages
  - Official: Telugu
- Time zone: UTC+5:30 (IST)
- PIN: 534 269
- Telephone code: 08812
- Nearest city: Palakollu

Penumanchili is a village in West Godavari district in the state of Andhra Pradesh in India.

== Demographics ==
As of 2011 India census, Penumanchili has a population of 3924 of which 1984 are males while 1940 are females. The average sex ratio of Penumanchili village is 978. The child population is 392, which makes up 9.99% of the total population of the village, with sex ratio 876. In 2011, the literacy rate of Penumanchili village was 74.04% when compared to 67.02% of Andhra Pradesh.

== See also ==
- West Godavari district
