= Chebrol railway station =

Railway station in Andhra Pradesh, India

Chebrol
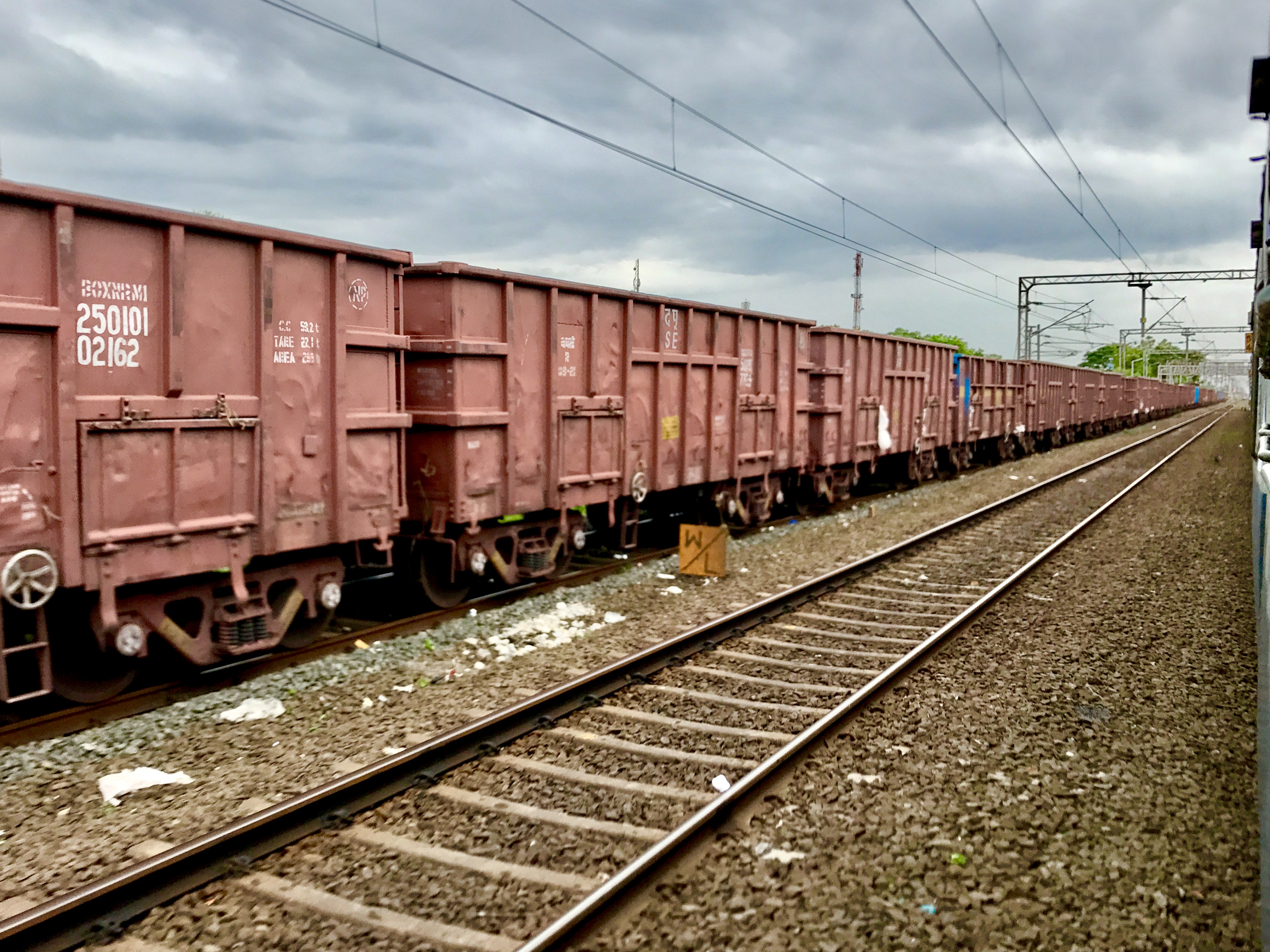
- Goods train at Chebrole railway station

General information
- Location: Chebrol, West Godavari district, Andhra Pradesh; India
- Coordinates: 16°49′10″N 81°23′46″E
- Elevation: 18 m (59 ft)
- System: Indian Railways station
- Owner: Indian Railways
- Operator: South Central Railway
- Line: Visakhapatnam–Vijayawada section of Howrah–Chennai main line
- Platforms: 2 side platforms are gravel
- Tracks: 2 5 ft 6 in (1,676 mm) broad gauge

Construction
- Structure type: Standard (on ground station)
- Parking: Not available

Other information
- Station code: CEL
- Division(s): Vijayawada

History
- Opened: 1893–96
- Electrified: 1995–96

Services
Preceding station	Indian Railways	Following station
Unguturu towards ?	South Coast Railway zone Visakhapatnam–Vijayawada section of Howrah–Chennai main line	Kaikaram towards ?
Location
- Location within Andhra Pradesh Location within India
- Interactive map

Chebrol railway station (station code:CEL), is an Indian Railways station in Chebrolu town of Andhra Pradesh. It is located in chebrolu village. It lies on the Vijayawada–Nidadavolu loop line of Howrah–Chennai main line and is administered under Vijayawada railway division of South Coast Railway zone. Twelve trains halt there every day.

== History ==
Between 1893 and 1896, 1,288 km (800 mi) of the East Coast State Railway, between Vijayawada and Cuttack, was opened for traffic. The southern part of the East Coast State Railway (from Waltair to Vijayawada) was taken over by Madras Railway in 1901.
