= Koderu =

- village
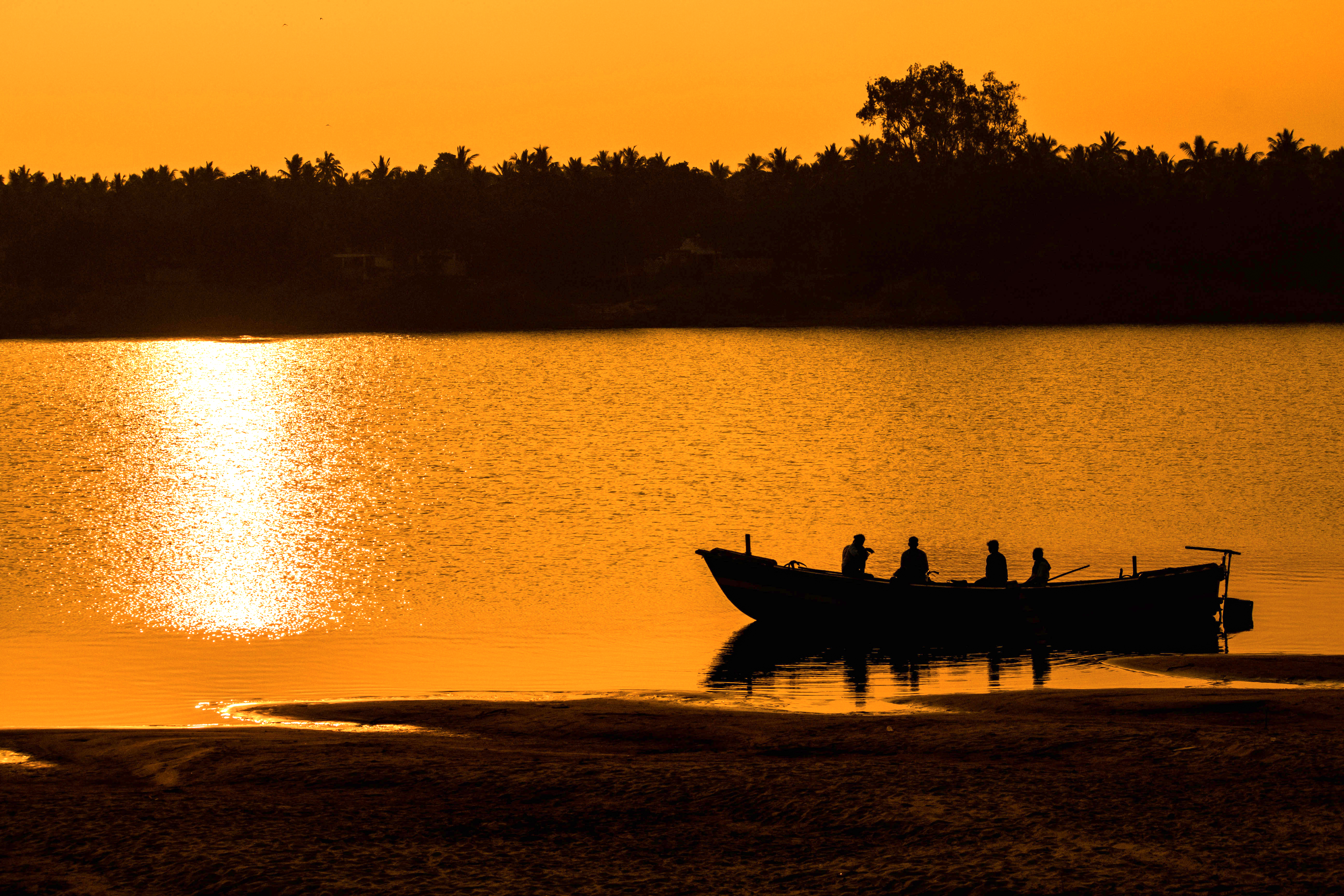
- Godavari river near Koderu
- Interactive map of Koderu
- Location of Achanta mandal in Andhra Pradesh, India Koderu (India)
- Coordinates: 16.603868°N 81.856593°E
- Country: India
- State: Andhra Pradesh
- District: West Godavari
- Mandal: Achanta

Population (2011)
  - Total: 1,729

Languages
  - Official: Telugu
- Time zone: UTC+5:30 (IST)
- PIN: 534 269
- Telephone code: 08814
- Nearest city: Palakollu

Koderu is a village in West Godavari district in the state of Andhra Pradesh in India. The nearest railway station is Palakollu (PKO) located at a distance of 3.87 Km.

== Demographics ==
As of 2011 India census, Koderu has a population of 1729 of which 868 are males while 861 are females. The average sex ratio of Koderu village is 992. The child population is 164, which makes up 9.49% of the total population of the village, with sex ratio 929. In 2011, the literacy rate of Koderu village was 78.72% when compared to 67.02% of Andhra Pradesh.

== See also ==
- West Godavari district
