= Bhimalapuram =

- village
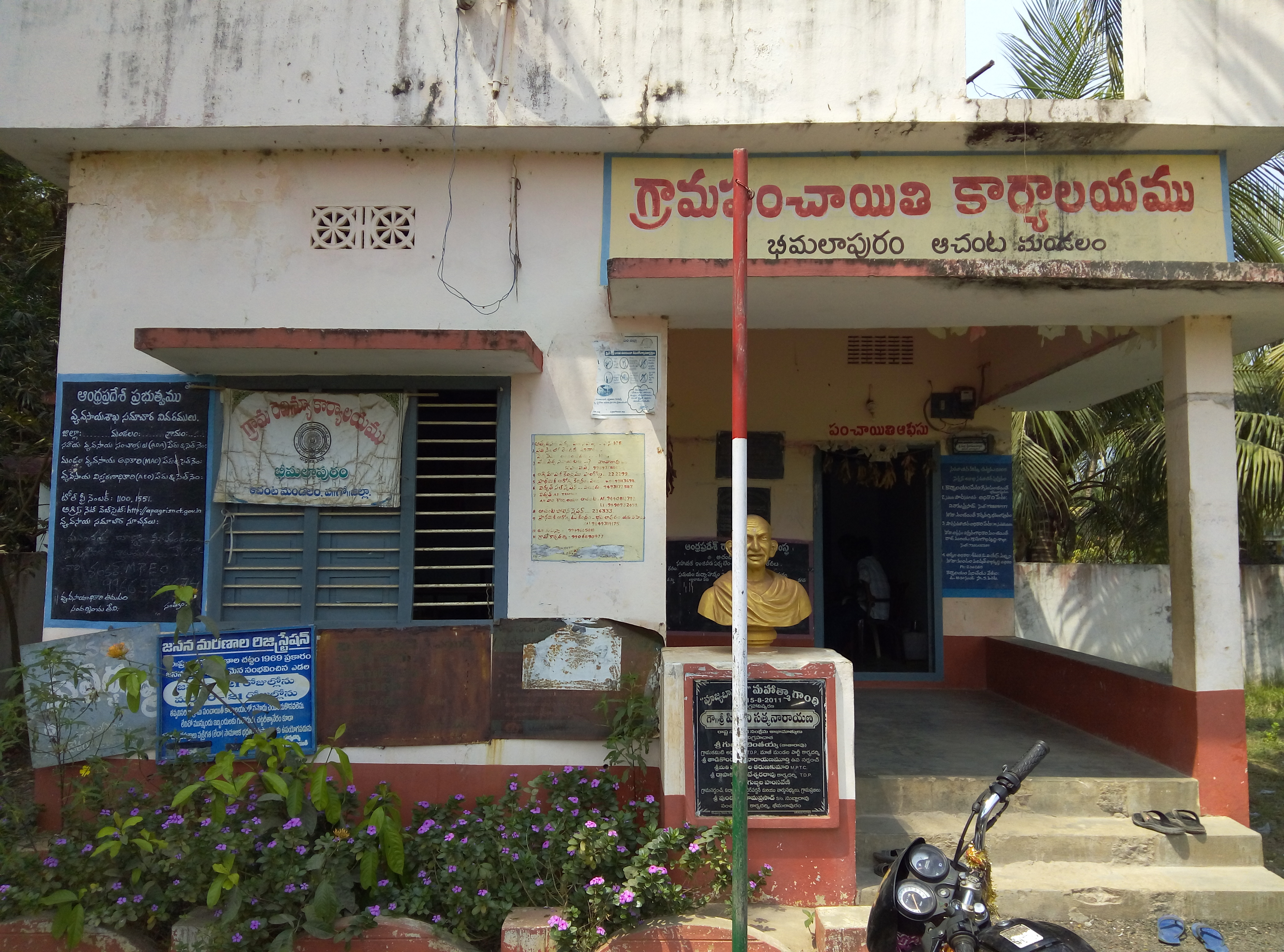
- Village hall
- Interactive map of Bhimalapuram
- Location of Achanta mandal in Andhra Pradesh, India Bhimalapuram (India)
- Coordinates: 16.554556°N 81.850521°E
- Country: India
- State: Andhra Pradesh
- District: West Godavari
- Mandal: Achanta

Population (2011)
  - Total: 5,302

Languages
  - Official: Telugu
- Time zone: UTC+5:30 (IST)
- PIN: 534 266
- Telephone code: 08812
- Nearest city: Palakollu

Bhimalapuram is a village in West Godavari district in the state of Andhra Pradesh in India. Bhimavaram railway Junction connects major towns.

== Demographics ==
As of 2011 India census, Bhimalapuram has a population of 5302 of which 2646 are males while 2656 are females. The average sex ratio of Bhimalapuram village is 1004. The child population is 580, which makes up 10.94% of the total population of the village, with sex ratio 1071. In 2011, the literacy rate of Bhimalapuram village was 75.82% when compared to 67.02% of Andhra Pradesh.

== See also ==
- West Godavari district
