= Pedamallam =

- village
- Interactive map of Pedamallam
- Location of Achanta mandal in Andhra Pradesh, India Pedamallam (India)
- Coordinates: 16.626175°N 81.831608°E
- Country: India
- State: Andhra Pradesh
- District: West Godavari
- Mandal: Achanta

Population (2011)
  - Total: 3,278

Languages
  - Official: Telugu
- Time zone: UTC+5:30 (IST)
- PIN: 534 123
- Telephone code: 08812
- Nearest city: Palakollu

Pedamallam is a village in West Godavari district in the state of Andhra Pradesh in India.

== Demographics ==
As of 2011 India census, Pedamallam has a population of 3278 of which 1696 are males while 1582 are females. The average sex ratio (the number of females per 1000 males) of Pedamallam village was 933. The child population was 303, which made up 9.24% of the total population of the village, with a sex ratio of 894. In 2011, the literacy rate of Pedamallam village was 75.16% when compared to 67.02% of Andhra Pradesh.

== See also ==
- West Godavari district
