= Padala =

Coordinates: 16°48′11″N 81°30′04″E

- Interactive map of Padala
- Location in Andhra Pradesh, India
- Country: India
- State: Andhra Pradesh
- District: West Godavari
- Mandal: Tadepalligudem

Government
  - Type: Gram Panchayat

Area
  - Total: 4.21 km^{2} (1.63 sq mi)

Population (2011)
  - Total: 2,446
  - Density: 581/km^{2} (1,500/sq mi)

Languages
  - Official: Telugu
- Time zone: UTC+5:30 (IST)
- PIN: 534102
- Vehicle registration: AP

Padala is a village in West Godavari district of the Indian state of Andhra Pradesh. It is located in Tadepalligudem mandal of Tadepalligudem revenue division.
