= Achanta mandal =

Achanta Mandal
- Mandal
- Interactive map of Achanta Mandal
- Location in Andhra Pradesh, India
- Coordinates: 16.598°N 81.811°E
- Country: India
- State: Andhra Pradesh
- District: West Godavari
- Headquarters: Achanta

Government
  - Body: Mandal Parishad

Area
  - Total: 73.01 km^{2} (28.19 sq mi)
- Elevation: 14 m (46 ft)

Population (2011)
  - Total: 60,711
  - Density: 831.5/km^{2} (2,154/sq mi)

Languages
  - Official: Telugu
- Time zone: UTC+5:30 (IST)
- Vehicle registration: AP 37

Achanta Mandal is one of the 46 mandals in West Godavari district of the Indian state of Andhra Pradesh. Its headquarters are located in Achanta. The mandal is bordered by Godavari River to the north, Yelamanchili mandal to the east, Poduru mandal to the south, and Penugonda mandal to the west.

== Demographics ==
As of the 2011 Census of India, Achanta Mandal had a population of 60,711, 30,614 males and 30,097 females, resulting in a female to male ratio of 983:1,000. There were 17,477 households, with an average of 3-4 people per household. 5,665 children are in the age group of 0–6 years, of which 2,829 are boys and 2,836 are girls, with a female to male ratio of 1,002:1,000 males. The average literacy rate stands at 77.36% with 22,697 males and 19,884 females. Schedule Caste represents 26.6% of the population (16,159 people), and Schedule Tribe represents 0.6% (374 people).

=== Employment ===
In 2011, 30,259 people (19,304 male; 10,955 female) were engaged in work activities out of the total population of Achanta Mandal. 23,191 people describe their work as main work (employed for six months or more): 1,997 cultivators (owners), 16,390 agricultural laborers, 685 in household industry, and 4,119 in other work areas. 7,068 people are marginal workers (employed for less than six months).

== Administration ==
Achanta Mandal is administered under the Achanta (Assembly constituency) of Narsapuram (Lok Sabha constituency). It is one of the twelve mandals that falls under the Narasapuram revenue division.

== Towns and villages ==
In 2011, the mandal had 10 settlements, all of which are small villages. In terms of population, Achanta is the largest and Kandaravalli is the smallest. The settlements in the mandal are Achanta, Achanta Vemavaram, Bhimalapuram, Kandaravalli, Karugorumilli, Kodamanchili, Koderu, Pedamallam, Penumanchili, and Valluru.

== Education ==
The mandal plays a major role in education for the rural students of nearby villages. Primary and secondary school education is imparted by government, aided and private schools, under the School Education Department of the state. For the academic year 2015–2016, the mandal had more than 6,466 students enrolled in over 80 schools.

== See also ==
- List of mandals in Andhra Pradesh
- Eluru
