= Kommugudem =

- Village
- Interactive map of Kommugudem
- Location in Andhra Pradesh, India
- Country: India
- State: Andhra Pradesh
- District: West Godavari
- Mandal: Tadepalligudem

Area
  - Total: 13.68 km^{2} (5.28 sq mi)

Population (2011)
  - Total: 5,074
  - Density: 370.9/km^{2} (960.6/sq mi)

Languages
  - Official: Telugu
- Time zone: UTC+5:30 (IST)
- Vehicle registration: AP

Kommugudem is a village in West Godavari district of the Indian state of Andhra Pradesh. It is located in Tadepalligudem mandal of Eluru revenue division. The nearest train station is Kaikaram (KKRM), located at a distance of 40.26 Km.

== Demographics ==
As of 2011 Census of India, Kommigudem, which is designated as tribal area, had a population of 5074. The total population constituted 2531 males and 2543 females with a sex ratio of 1005 females per 1000 males. 549 children are in the age group of 0–6 years, with a sex ratio of 1064. The average literacy rate stands at 66.01%.
