= Unguturu mandal, Eluru district =

Unguturu mandal
- Mandal
- Interactive Map Outlining mandal
- Location in Andhra Pradesh, India
- Coordinates: 16.8230°N 81.4238°E
- Country: India
- State: Andhra Pradesh
- District: Eluru
- Headquarters: Unguturu

Government
  - Body: Mandal Parishad

Area
  - Total: 230.8 km^{2} (89.1 sq mi)

Population (2011)
  - Total: 80,722
  - Density: 349.7/km^{2} (905.8/sq mi)

Languages
  - Official: Telugu
- Time zone: UTC+5:30 (IST)
- Vehicle registration: AP 37

Unguturu mandal is one of 28 mandals (administrative divisions) in the Eluru district of the Indian state of Andhra Pradesh. The headquarters are located at Unguturu. The mandal is bordered by Tadepalligudem mandal and Pentapadu mandal to the north, Nallajerla mandal to the west, Nidamarru mandal to the east, and by Dwaraka Tirumala mandal and Bhimadole mandal to the south

== Demographics ==
As of the 2011 census, the mandal had a population of 80,722 in 23,080 households. The total population constituted 40,417 males and 40,305 females with a sex ratio of 997 females per 1000 males. 8,258 children were in the age group of 0–6 years, of which 4,197 were boys and 4,061 were girls with a sex ratio of 967. The average literacy rate stood at 69.59% with 50,429 literates of which 26,138 were males and 24,291 were females.

The population of Scheduled Caste members was 18,305 whereas Schedule Tribe population was 1,058.

=== Work profile ===
As per the report published by Census India in 2011, 38,758 people were engaged in work activities out of the total population of Unguturu mandal which included 24,999 males and 13,759 females.

According to census survey report 2011, 33,709 workers described their work as main work, 4,112 as cultivators, 22,100 persons worked as agricultural laborers, 560 in household industries and 6,937 were involved in other jobs. Of them 5,049 were marginal workers.

== Administration ==
Unguturu mandal is administered under Unguturu (Assembly constituency) of Eluru (Lok Sabha constituency) and one of the sixteen mandals under Eluru revenue division.

== Towns and villages ==
As of the 2011 census, the mandal has 17 settlements, all of which are villages. In terms of population, Chebrolu is the largest village, while Chebrole Khandrika is the smallest village.

The settlements in the mandal are:

- A.Gokavaram
- Badampudi
- Bommidi
- Chebrole
- Chebrolu
- Dontavaram
- Gopinadhapatnam
- Kagupadu
- Kaikaram
- Kakarlamudi
- Nallamadu
- Rachuru
- Ravulaparru
- Tallapuram
- Unguturu
- Vellamilli
- Venkatadriapparaopuram

== Education ==
The mandal plays a major role in the education of rural students from the nearby villages. The primary and secondary school education is imparted by government, aided and private schools, under the School Education Department of the state. As per the school information report for the academic year 2015–16, the mandal had more than 9,675 students enrolled in over 86 schools.

== See also ==
- List of mandals in Andhra Pradesh
- Eluru
