= Ravulapalem =

- Village
- Banana plants near Ravulapalem
- Interactive map of Ravulapalem
- Location in Andhra Pradesh, India
- Coordinates: 16°29′N 81°59′E
- Country: India
- State: Andhra Pradesh
- District: Dr. B.R. Ambedkar Konaseema
- Assembly Constituency: Kothapeta
- Talukas: Kothapeta

Area
  - Total: 9 km^{2} (3.5 sq mi)
  - Rank: 7

Population (2011)
  - Total: 23,142
  - Rank: 19
  - Density: 2,600/km^{2} (6,700/sq mi)

Languages
  - Official: Telugu
- Time zone: UTC+5:30 (IST)
- PIN: 533238
- Vehicle Registration: AP05 (Former); AP39 (from 30 January 2019)
- Website: http://www.ravulapalem.com/

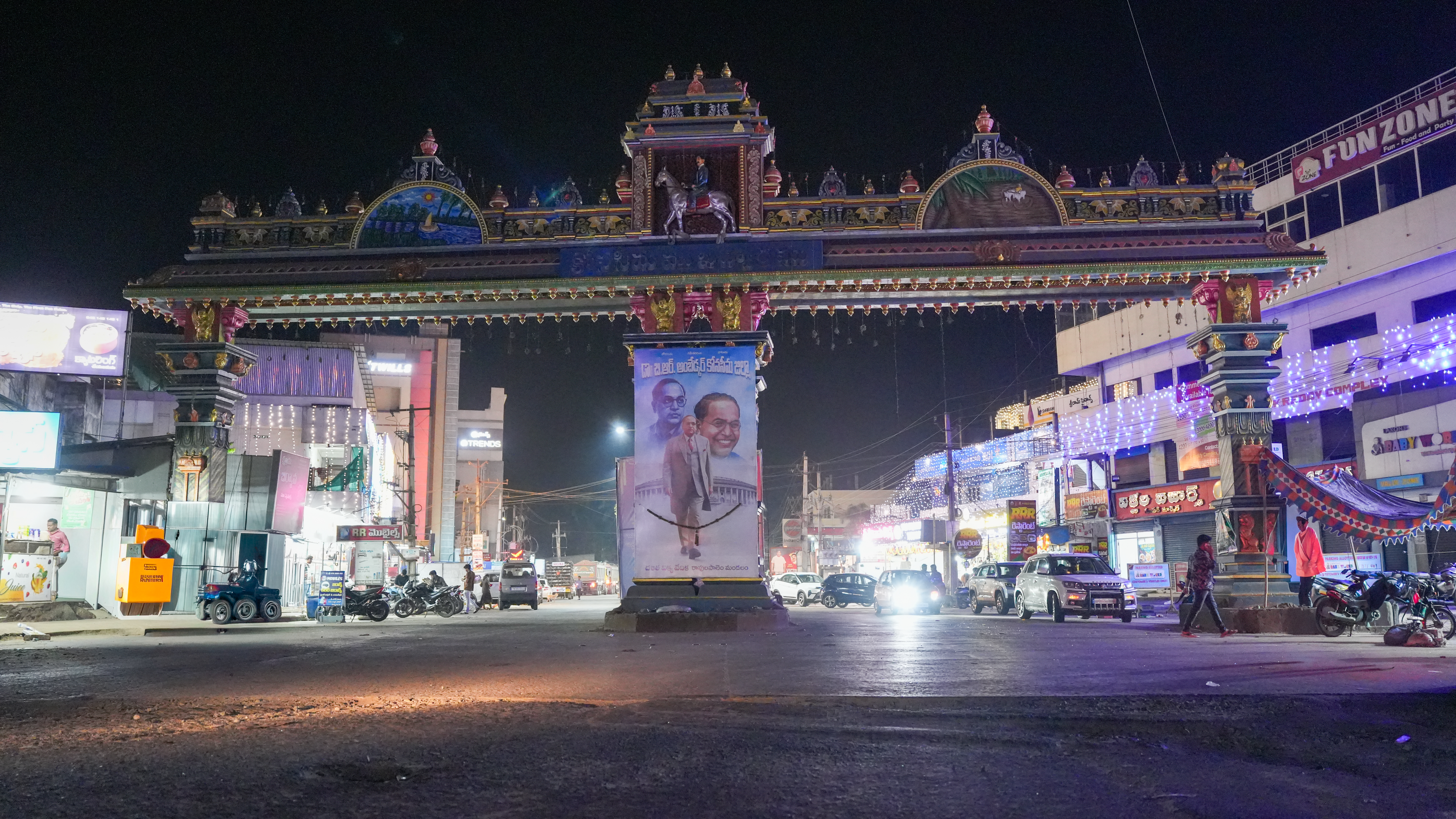
Inserted Konaseema Entrance Photo

Ravulapalem is a village in Ravulapalem mandal, Dr. B.R. Ambedkar Konaseema district of Andhra Pradesh. It is the entry point for the Konaseema Delta region. Ravulapalem is known for its banana market, diverse cuisine, hospitality and numerous trucking services that cater to PAN India.

== Governance ==
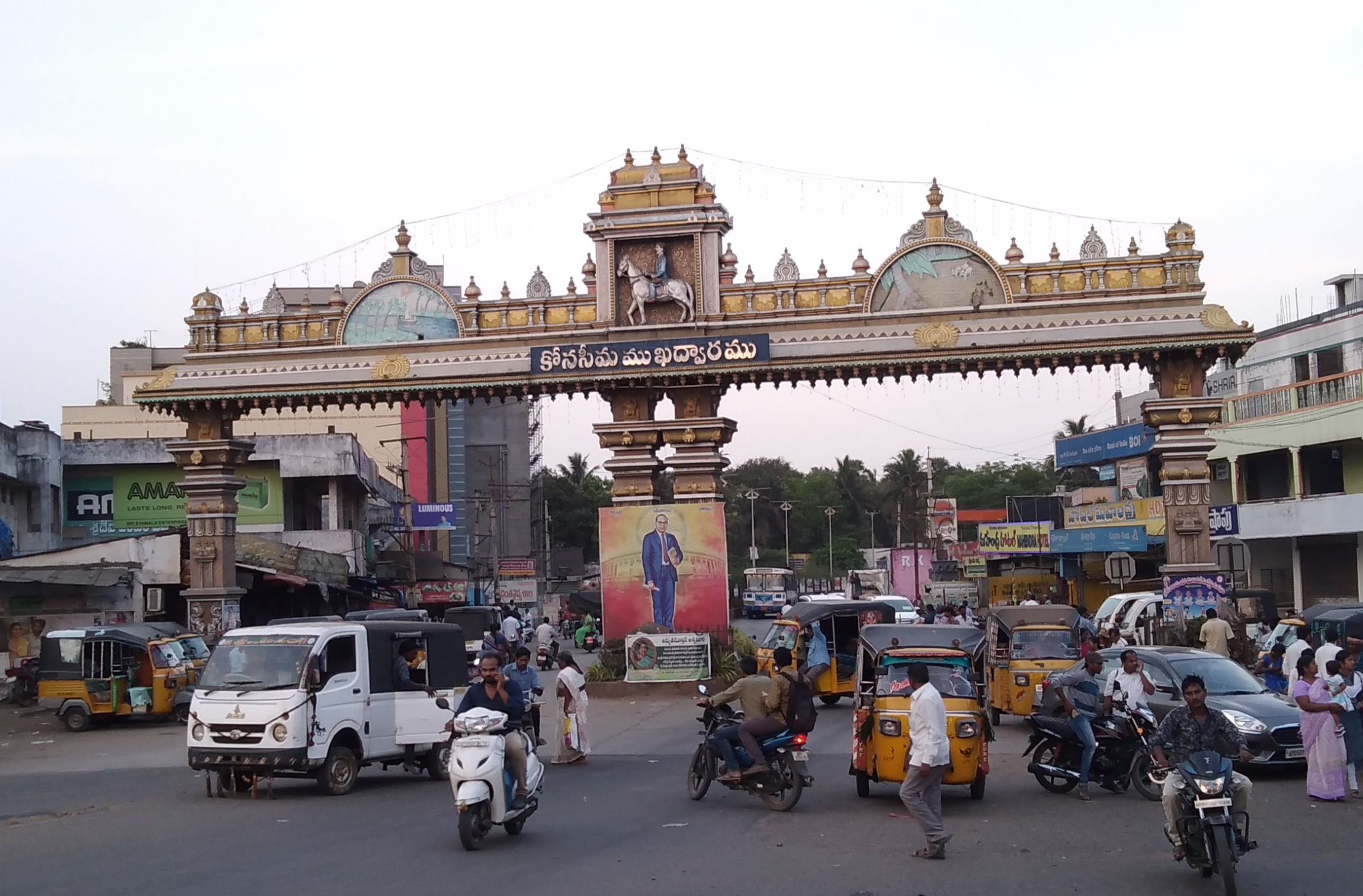
Entrance of Konaseema at Ravulapalem

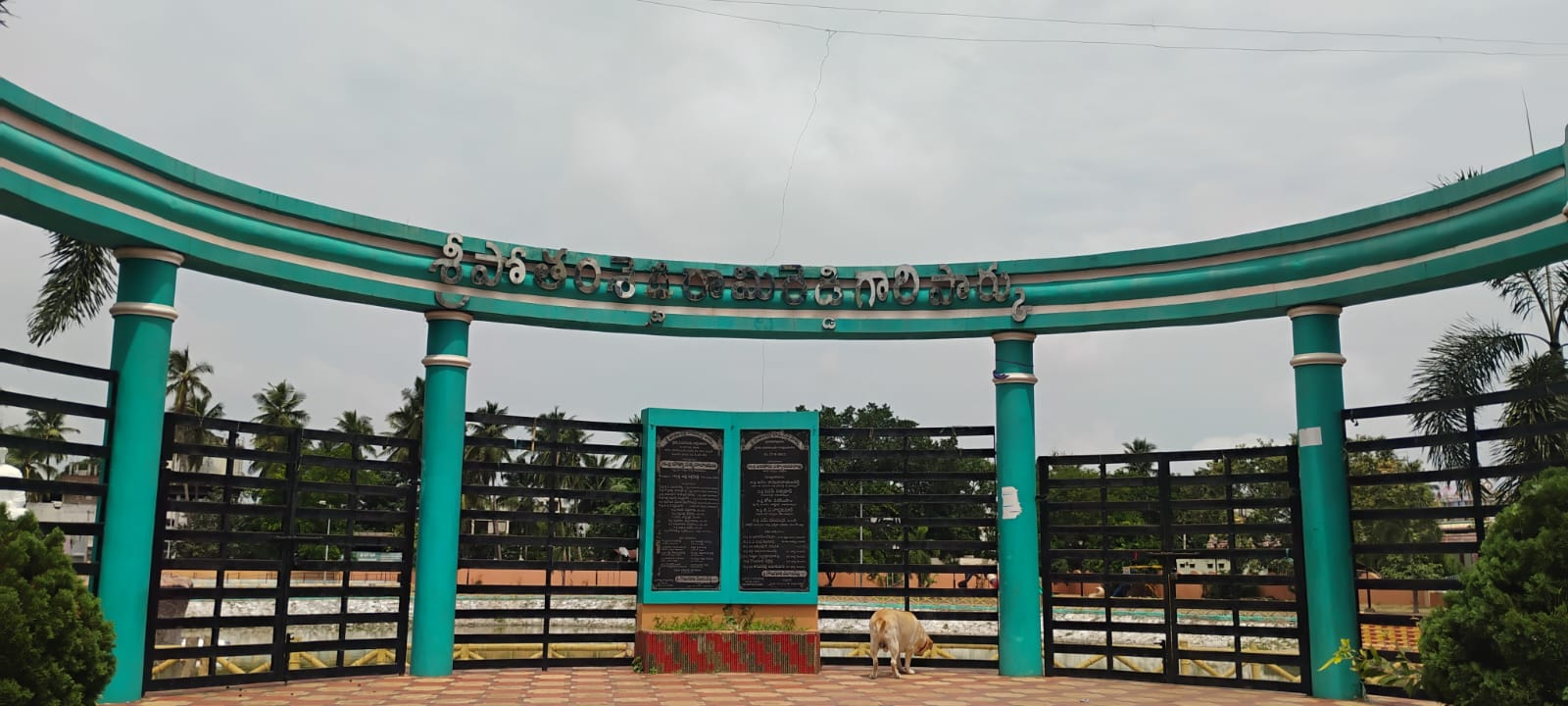
Park in Ravulapalem

The civic body of Ravulapalem is going to be upgraded as a municipal council.

== Transport ==
Ravulapalem is located on NH 216A. The nearest major railway stations are Rajahmundry railway station and Tanuku railway station, and the nearest airport is Rajahmundry Airport, 40km away. Ravulapalem bus station is here.
