= Tadepalligudem mandal =

- Mandal
- Interactive Map Outlining mandal
- Location in Andhra Pradesh, India
- Coordinates: 16.8333°N 81.5000°E
- Country: India
- State: Andhra Pradesh
- District: West Godavari
- Headquarters: Tadepalligudem

Government
  - Body: Mandal Parishad

Area
  - Total: 199.26 km^{2} (76.93 sq mi)

Population (2011)
  - Total: 88,256
  - Density: 442.92/km^{2} (1,147.2/sq mi)

Languages
  - Official: Telugu
- Time zone: UTC+5:30 (IST)

Tadepalligudem mandal is one of the 19 mandals in West Godavari district of the Indian state of Andhra Pradesh. It is under the administration of Tadepalligudem revenue division and the headquarters are located at Tadepalligudem. The mandal is bounded by Nallajerla, Devarapalle, Nidadavolu, Unguturu, Pentapadu, Tanuku and Undrajavaram mandals.

== Demographics ==
As of 2011 census, the mandal had a population of 88,256 with 24,628 households. The total population constitute, 44,550 males and 43,706 females —a sex ratio of 981 females per 1000 males. 9,086 children are in the age group of 0–6 years, of which 4,563 are boys and 4,523 are girls. There are 54,483 literates.

== Government and politics ==
Tadepalligudem mandal is one of the 2 mandals under Tadepalligudem (Assembly constituency), which in turn represents Narsapuram (Lok Sabha constituency) of Andhra Pradesh.

== Towns and villages ==
As of 2011 census of India, the mandal has 19 settlements, which includes 1 towns and 18 villages. Tadepalligudem (M) is the only town and Kunchanapalle (OG) is partly out growth to Tadepalligudem (M).

The settlements in the mandal are listed below:

1. Apparaopeta
2. Arugolanu
3. Arulla
4. Jaggannapeta
5. Jagannadhapuram
6. Kadiyedda
7. Kommugudem
8. Krishnayapalem
9. Kunavaram
10. Kunchanapalle (Part)
11. Kondruprolu
12. Madhavaram
13. Marampalli
14. Nandamuru
15. Nawabpalem
16. Padala
17. Tadepalle
18. Veerampalem
19. Venkatramannagudem

Notes
(M) denotes a Municipality
(OG) denotes an Out Growth

== See also ==
- List of mandals in Andhra Pradesh
