= Chebrolu, Eluru district =

Chebrolu
- Village
- Interactive map of Chebrolu
- Location in Andhra Pradesh, India Chebrolu (India)
- Coordinates: 16°49′31″N 81°23′41″E
- Country: India
- State: Andhra Pradesh
- District: Eluru
- Mandal: Unguturu

Population (2011)
  - Total: 14,216

Languages
  - Official: Telugu
- Time zone: UTC+05:30 (IST)
- Postal code: 534 406

Chebrolu is a village in Eluru district of the Indian state of Andhra Pradesh in Unguturu mandal of Eluru revenue division. The nearest town is Tadepalligudem.

== Demographics ==
As of 2011's Census of India, Chebrolu village had a population of 14216, 6984 males and 7232 females. The average sex ratio of 1036 is higher than Andhra Pradesh state average of 993. There were 1440 children 0-6, 10.13% of total population of village. The Child Sex Ratio is 917, lower than theAndhra Pradesh average of 939. The literacy rate was 72.52% compared to 67.02% for Andhra Pradesh.

== Education ==
There are 9 government primary schools, seven private primary schools, five government high schools, five private high schools, two government secondary schools, and two private secondary schools.
