= Peravali mandal =

Coordinates: 16.751°N 81.742°E

- Mandal
- Interactive Map Outlining mandal
- Location in Andhra Pradesh, India
- Country: India
- State: Andhra Pradesh
- District: East Godavari

Languages
  - Official: Telugu
- Time zone: UTC+5:30 (IST)

Peravali mandal is one of the 19 mandals in the East Godavari district of the Indian state of Andhra Pradesh.
