= Tadepalligudem railway station =

Railway station in Andhra Pradesh, India

Tadepalligudem

General information
- Location: Station Road, Tadepalligudem, West Godavari district, Andhra Pradesh; India
- Coordinates: 16.8102155°N 81.5266013°E
- Operator: Indian Railways
- Lines: Howrah–Chennai main line Visakhapatnam–Vijayawada section
- Platforms: 3
- Tracks: 6 5 ft 6 in (1,676 mm) broad gauge

Construction
- Structure type: On ground
- Parking: Available
- Accessible: Disabled access

Other information
- Station code: TDD
- Zone(s): South Central Railway
- Division(s): Vijayawada

History
- Opened: 1916; 110 years ago

Services
Preceding station	Indian Railways	Following station
Prattipadu towards Visakhapatnam	Howrah–Chennai main line	Badampudi towards Vijayawada
Location
- Location within Andhra Pradesh Location within India
- Interactive map

Tadepalligudem railway station (station code:TDD) located in Andhra Pradesh, serves Tadepalligudem in West Godavari district. It is administered under Vijayawada railway division of South Coast Railway zone (formerly South Central Railway zone).

== History ==
Between 1893 and 1896, 1,288 km (800 mi) of the East Coast State Railway, between Vijayawada and Cuttack was opened for traffic. The southern part of the East Coast State Railway (from Waltair to Vijayawada) was taken over by Madras Railway in 1901.

== Classification ==
In terms of earnings and outward passengers handled, Tadepalligudem is categorized as a Non-Suburban Grade-3 (NSG-3) railway station. Based on the re–categorization of Indian Railway stations for the period of 2017–18 and 2022–23, an NSG–3 category station earns between ₹20–₹100 crore and handles 5–10 million passengers. The station is one of the Google Stations available in this division

Passenger lifts are available on both Platform 1 and Platform 2

It is one of the 38 stations in the division to be equipped with Automatic Ticket Vending Machines (ATVMs).
