= Kaikaram =

Kaikaram RaRaju
- Village
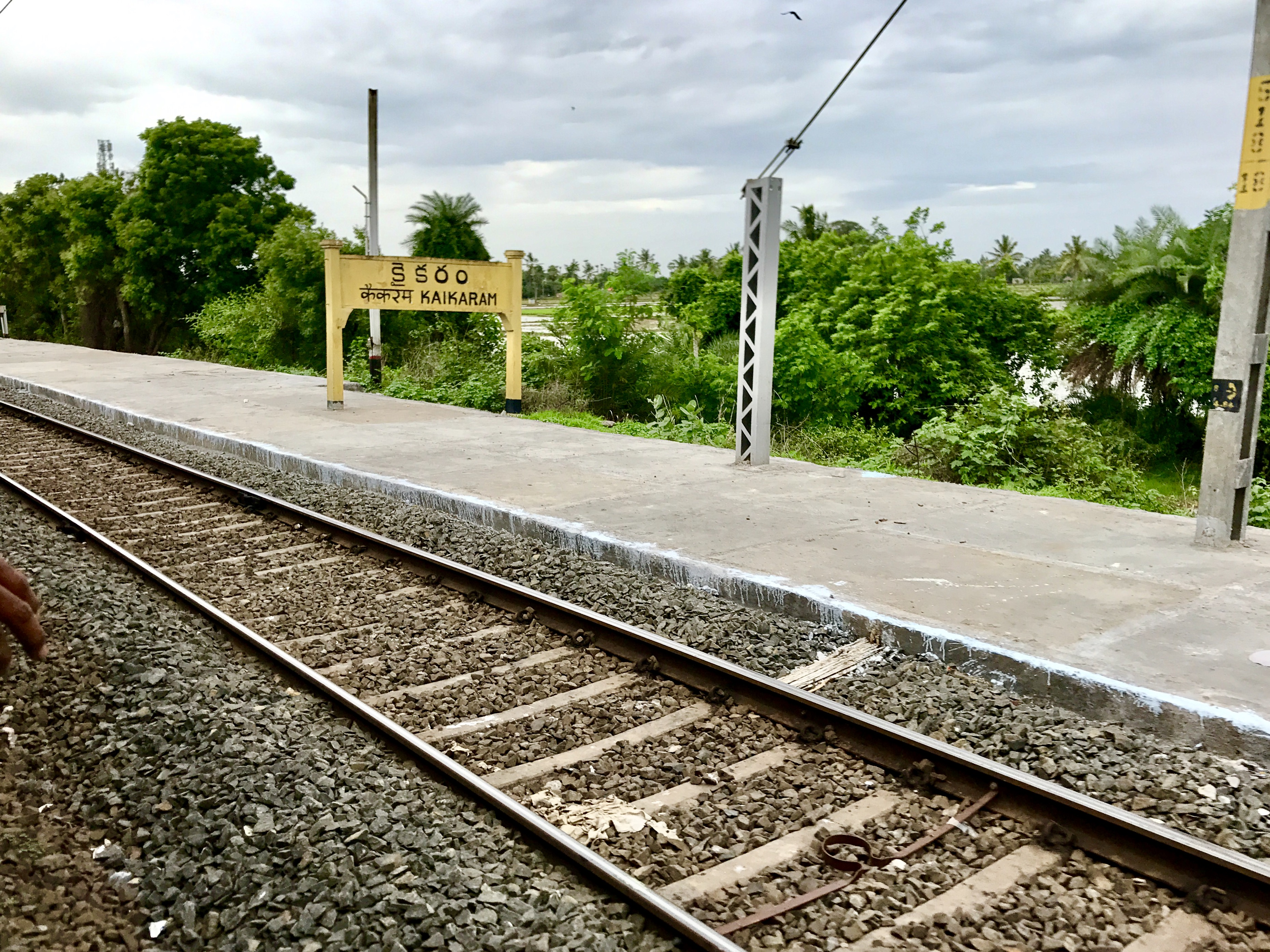
- Kaikaram railway station signboard
- Interactive map of Kaikaram
- Location in Andhra Pradesh, India Kaikaram (India)
- Coordinates: 16.812°N 81.366°E
- Country: India
- State: Andhra Pradesh
- District: Eluru

Government
  - Type: Democratic
  - Body: Gram Panchayat

Languages
  - Official: Telugu
- Time zone: UTC+5:30 (IST)
- PIN: 534416
- Telephone code: 91-8818

Kaikaram is one of the major panchayats in the Unguturu mandal of Eluru district, Andhra Pradesh, India. Kaikaram (KKRM) has its own train station connecting to major cities.

== Demographics ==
As of 2011 Census of India, Kaikaram had a population of 9532. The total population constitute, 4778 males and 4754 females with a sex ratio of 995 females per 1000 males. 934 children are in the age group of 0–6 years, with sex ratio of 987. The average literacy rate stands at 72.78%.
