= Duvva =

Duvva Durvasapuram
- Village
- Interactive map of Duvva
- Location within Andhra Pradesh
- Coordinates: 16°46′45″N 81°37′27″E
- Country: India
- State: Andhra Pradesh
- District: West Godavari
- Mandal: Tanuku

Area
  - Total: 17.99 km^{2} (6.95 sq mi)

Population (2011)
  - Total: 13,596
- Time zone: UTC+05:30 (IST)
- Pincode: 534156
- Vehicle registration: AP30 (Former) AP39 (from 30 January 2019)

Duvva is a village in West Godavari district of the Indian state of Andhra Pradesh. It is located in Tanuku mandal of Kovvur revenue division. The nearest railway station is Satyavada (STVA) located at a distance of 5.77 km from Duvva.

== Economy ==
The economy of Duvva is largely based on agriculture & small manufacturing. Most of the surrounding area is fertile farm land. The main crops grown in Duvva are rice and bananas. This is due to the composition of the soil, which is too moist to grow plants such as potatoes, and topography, which prohibits the growing of vegetables such as Eggplants or Tomatoes.

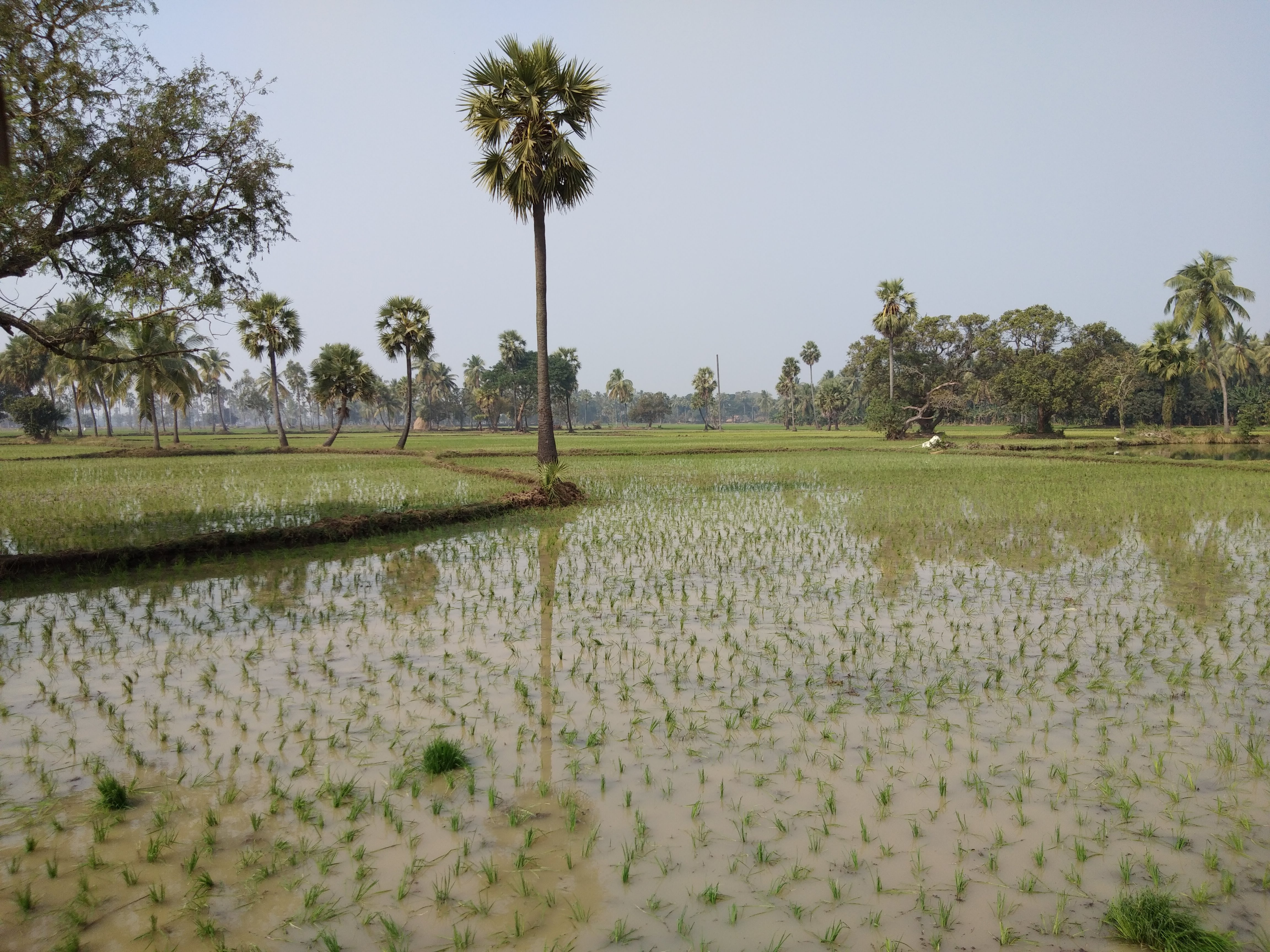
Rice Patti Found in Duvva, India. An agricultural based economy.

== Etymology ==
It is believed that the sage, Durvasa had established the village and the village was formerly known with the name, Durvasapuram.

== Education and healthcare ==
Duvva has several educational institutions serving local residents, including the MPP No.1 School and a Zilla Parishad High School located within the village; private schooling is available nearby at Sasi English Medium School in Tanuku. Healthcare needs in the village are met by a government hospital and a Byrraju Health Center located in Duvva itself, along with a veterinary hospital for local livestock, while residents seeking specialized private treatment travel to Sri Sai Hospital or Sri Satya Hospital in nearby Tanuku.

== Transport and governance ==
The village is connected by road through the Tanuku Bypass and Tanuku APSRTC bus stations, and by rail through the nearby Satyavada and Navabpalem railway stations; Rajahmundry Airport, around 42 km away, is the nearest airport. Duvva functions as its own gram panchayat under Tanuku mandal, and falls under the Tanuku assembly constituency and the Narasapuram Lok Sabha constituency.

== Culture ==
Venugopala Swamy Temple in Duvva conducts a Kalyana utsavam, a ceremonial wedding rite for the deity, as part of its annual Sri Rama Navami festivities, drawing devotees from Duvva and surrounding villages.

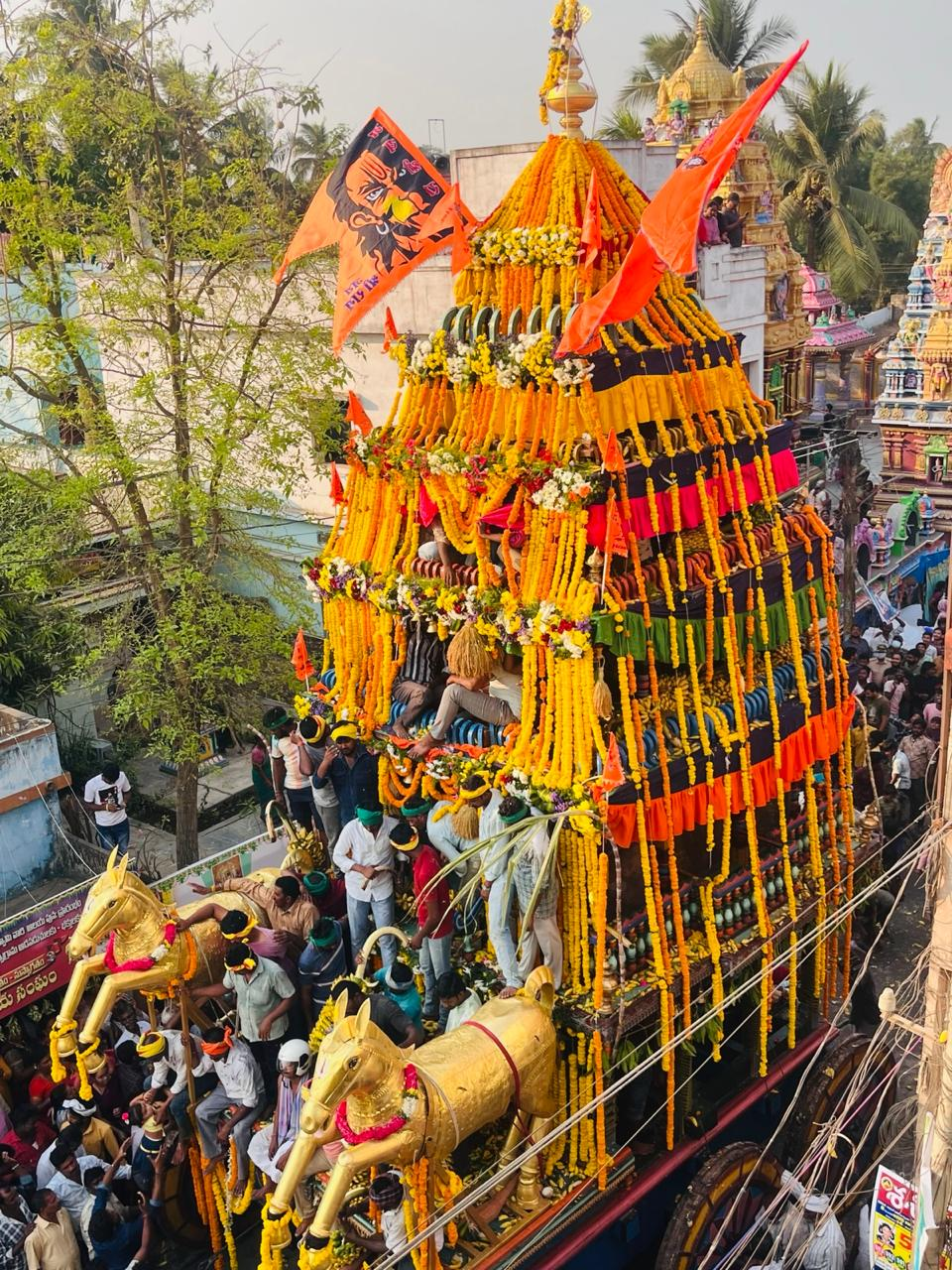
Decorated radham (temple chariot) at the annual festival, Venugopala Swamy Temple, Duvva

On 30 March 2023, a fire broke out at the Venugopala Swamy Temple in Duvva during Sri Rama Navami celebrations, after firecrackers set off by devotees ignited a decorative canopy erected for the festival. Devotees fled the temple premises in panic, but the blaze was extinguished by fire personnel and local residents with no casualties reported.

== Demographics ==
As of 2011 Census of India, Duvva had a population of 13596. The total population constitute, 6771 males and 6825 females with a sex ratio of 108 females per 100 males. 1360 children are in the age group of 0–6 years, with sex ratio of 873. The average literacy rate stands at 52.22%.
