= Pulla, Eluru district =

Coordinates: 16°48′N 81°19′E

Pulla
- Village
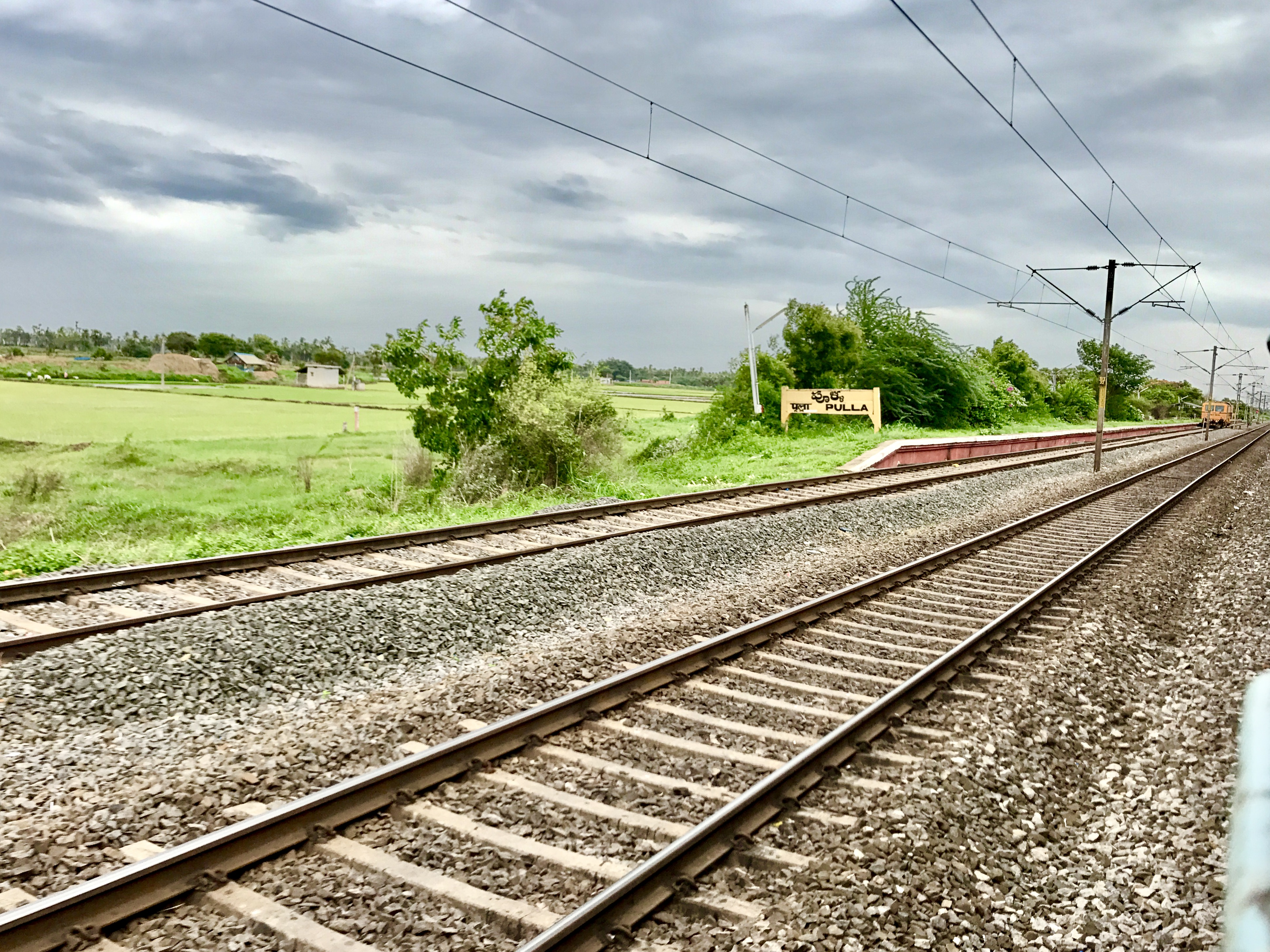
- Pulla railway station signboard
- Interactive map of Pulla
- Location in Andhra Pradesh, India Pulla (India)
- Country: India
- State: Andhra Pradesh
- District: Eluru

Languages
  - Official: Telugu
- Time zone: UTC+5:30 (IST)

Pulla is a village in Eluru district of the Indian state of Andhra Pradesh. It is situated in Bhimadole mandal of Eluru revenue division.

== Demographics ==
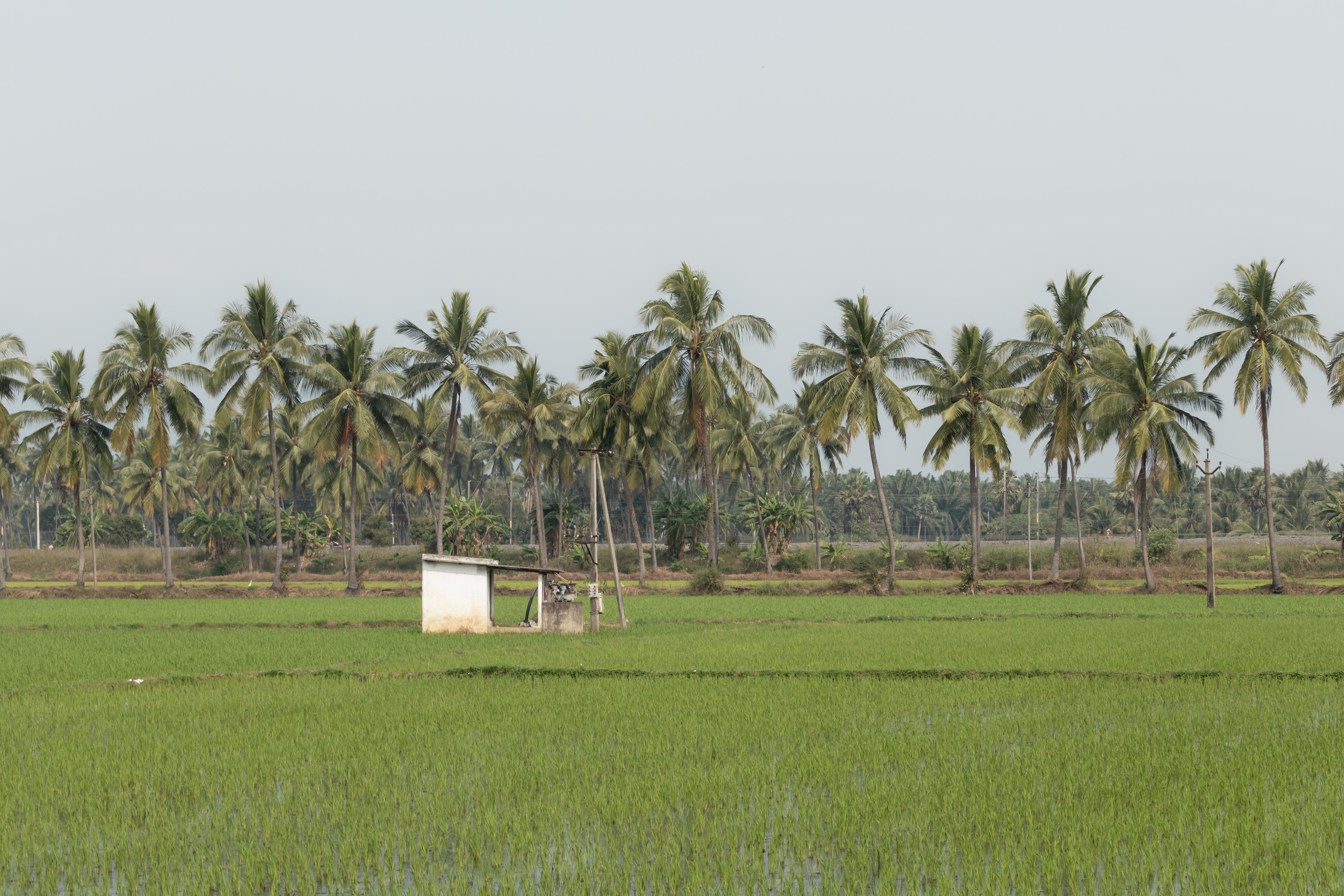
Paddy fields near Pulla village

As of 2011 Census of India, Pulla had a population of 13043. The total population constitute, 6497 males and 6546 females with a sex ratio of 1008 females per 1000 males. 1265 children are in the age group of 0–6 years, with sex ratio of 940 The average literacy rate stands at 70.75%.

== Sources ==
- "List of Sub-Districts". Census of India. Archived from the original on 14 May 2007. Retrieved 2007-05-25.
