= Tanuku railway station =

Railway station in Andhra Pradesh, India

Tanuku
- Tanuku railway station nameboard

General information
- Location: Tanuku, West Godavari district, Andhra Pradesh; India
- Coordinates: 16.752035°N 81.672722°E
- Owner: South Central Railways
- Operator: Indian Railways
- Line: Vijayawada–Nidadavolu loop line
- Platforms: 3
- Tracks: 2 5 ft 6 in (1,676 mm) broad gauge

Construction
- Structure type: Standard (on ground)
- Parking: Available
- Accessible: Disabled access

Other information
- Status: Active
- Station code: TNKU
- Zone(s): South Coast Railway
- Division(s): Vijayawada

History
- Opened: 1916; 110 years ago

Services
Preceding station	Indian Railways	Following station
Velpuru towards ?	Vijayawada–Nidadavolu loop line	Satyavada towards ?
Location
- Location within Andhra Pradesh Location within India
- Interactive map

Tanuku railway station (station code: TNKU), provides rail connectivity to the city of Tanuku in West Godavari district of Andhra Pradesh. It is administered under Vijayawada railway division of South Coast Railway Zone.

== Classification ==
In terms of earnings and outward passengers handled, Tanuku is categorized as a Non-Suburban Grade-5 (NSG-5) railway station. Based on the re–categorization of Indian Railway stations for the period of 2017–18 and 2022–23, an NSG–5 category station earns between ₹1–₹10 crore and handles 1–2 million passengers.

== Amenities ==
SCR recently installed Automatic Ticket Vending Machines (ATVM)s in this station. This station also has a First class waiting room, Free Safe drinking water. Free Wifi hotspots are being considered
