= Pentapadu =

- Village
- Interactive map of Pentapadu
- Coordinates: 16°46′49.347″N 81°31′31.283″E
- Country: India
- State: Andhra Pradesh
- District: West Godavari
- Established: 15/10/1970
- Talukas: Pentapadu

Languages
  - Official: Telugu
- Time zone: UTC+5:30 (IST)
- PIN: 534166
- Telephone code: 08818
- Vehicle registration: AP 37

Pentapadu is a village in West Godavari district of the Indian state of Andhra Pradesh.

== Demographics ==
As of 2011 Census of India, Pentapadu had a population of 12889. The total population constitutes, 6377 males and 6512 females with a sex ratio of 1021 females per 1000 males. 1273 children are in the age group of 0–6 years, with sex ratio of 958. The average literacy rate stands at 75.35%.

This was the birthplace of Actress Pushpavalli, the mother of Bollywood star Rekha.
