= Achanta =

- village
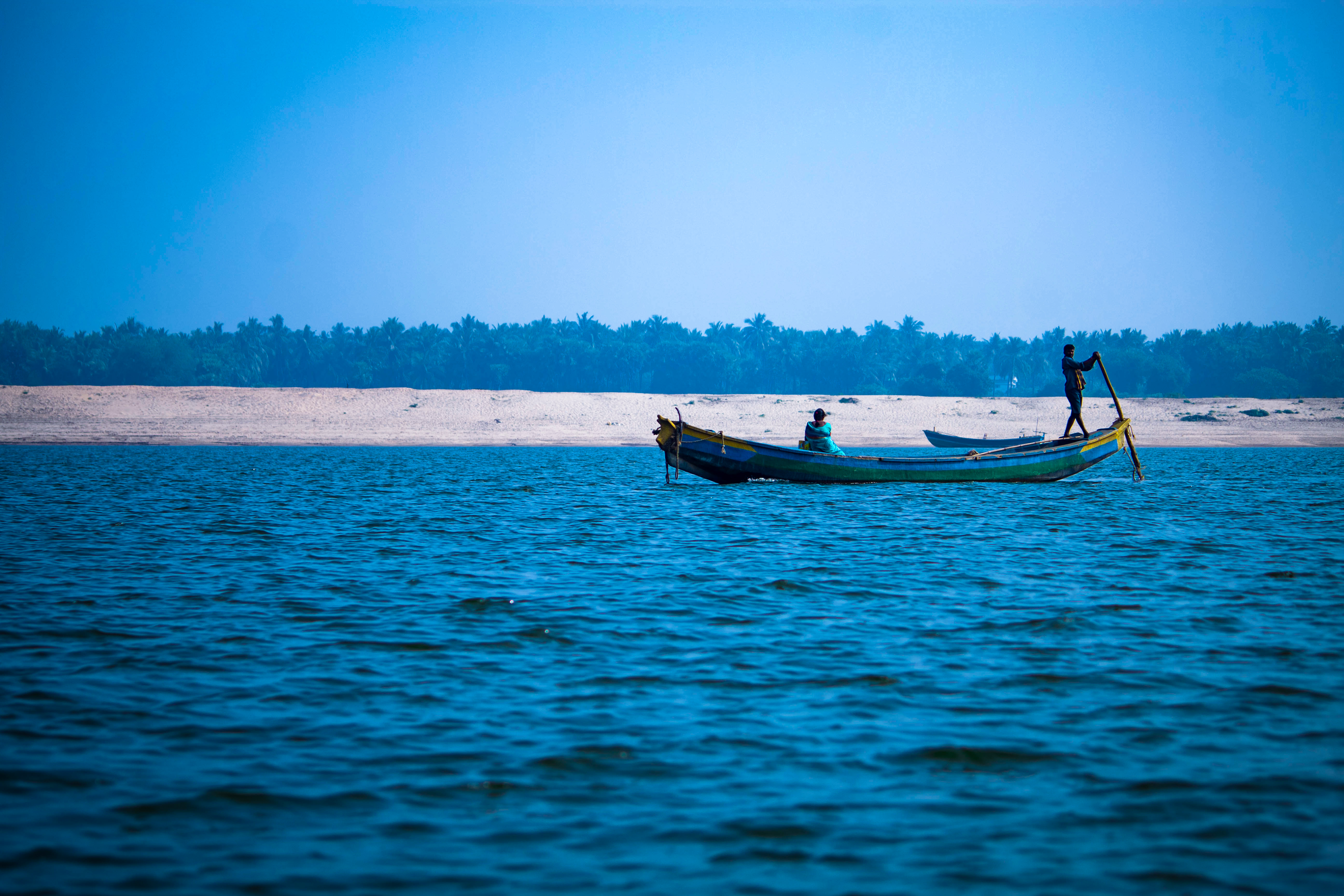
- Godavari river near Achanta
- Interactive map of Achanta
- Location in Andhra Pradesh, India
- Coordinates: 16°36′7.858″N 81°48′26.713″E
- Country: India
- State: Andhra Pradesh
- District: West Godavari
- Talukas: Achanta

Government
  - Body: Panchayati raj
  - MLA: Pitani Satyanarayana

Area
  - Total: 67.3 km^{2} (26.0 sq mi)

Population (2011)
  - Total: 19,507
  - Density: 290/km^{2} (751/sq mi)

Languages
  - Official: Telugu
- Time zone: UTC+5:30 (IST)
- PIN: 534123
- Vehicle registration: AP 37& AP 39
- Nearest city: Palakollu

Achanta is a village in Achanta mandal of West Godavari district in the Indian state of Andhra Pradesh.

== Geography ==
Achanta is a village located in the Godavari river basin. The nearest train station is Palakollu located at a distance of 13.21 km.

== History ==
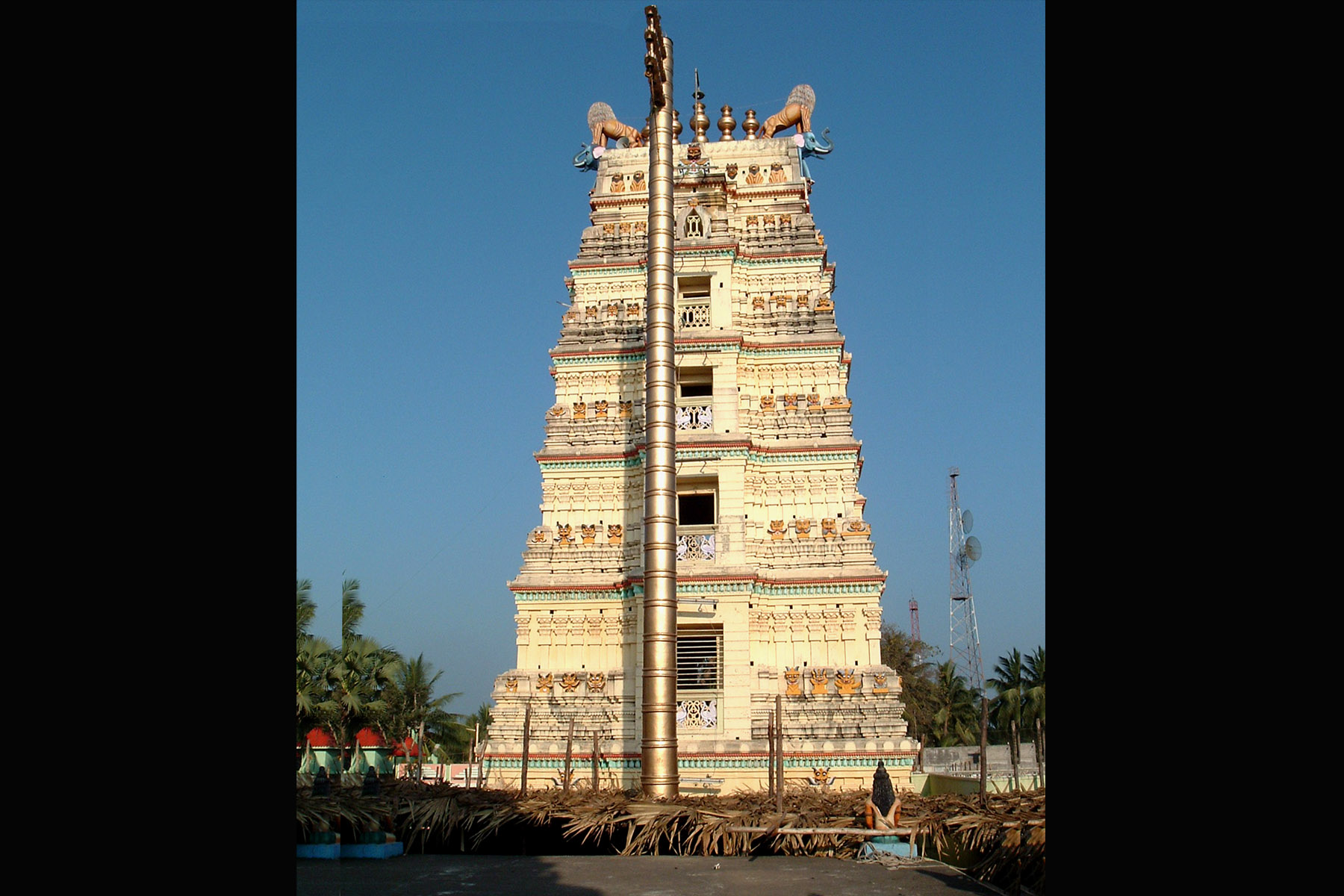
Sri RameswaraSwamy Temple

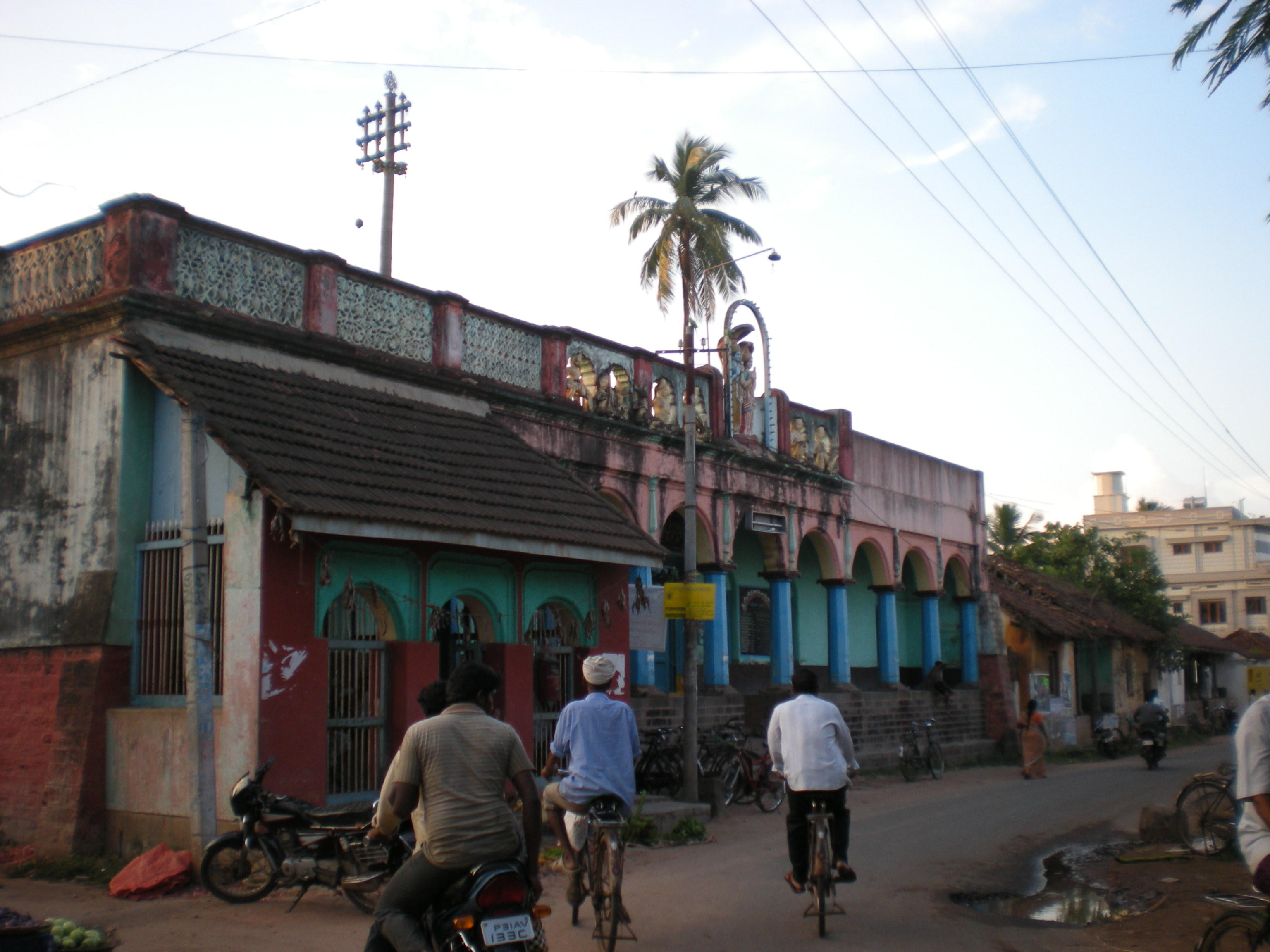
Sri MadanaGopalaswamy Temple

Also known as the Dakshina Kashi, Achanta (previously known as Marthandapuram) has a great history. In a Grant inscription found in SrungavarapuKota, dated to 5 A.D, stated that the Grant awardee Mathru Sharma native village is Achanta, reveals village exists at 5 A.D. Several stone inscriptions found on temples in Achanta suggest that it may have served as an important religious center for Eastern Chalukyan Empire (700 AD - 1130A D).

== Economy ==
Achanta consists mostly of agriculturists and small scale traders. Like most villages in Godavari River Delta, farmers manage to cultivate two crops of paddy and one summer crop (usually lentils). Many farm lands are surrounded by coconut trees and mango trees. Fridays and Sundays are market days.

== Demographics ==
As of the 2011 Census of India, Achanta had a population of 19,507. The total population constitute, 9,786 males and 9,721 females with a sex ratio of 993 females per 1000 males. 1,812 children are in the age group of 0–6 years, with sex ratio of 987. The average literacy rate stands at 76.59%.
