= Unguturu, Eluru district =

Unguturu Vungutur
- Village
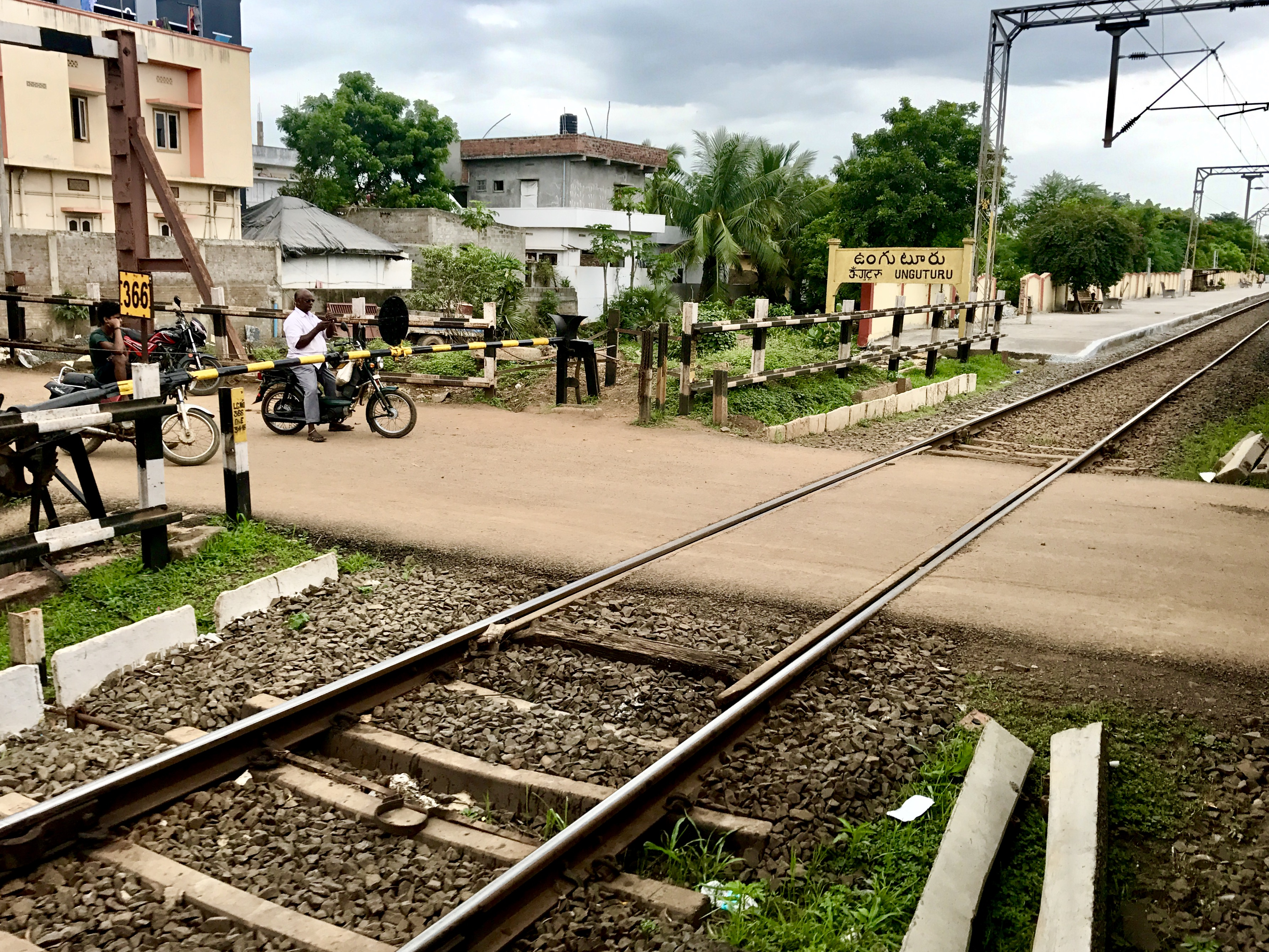
- Unguturu railway station signboard
- Interactive map of Unguturu
- Location in Andhra Pradesh, India Unguturu (India)
- Coordinates: 16.8230°N 81.4238°E
- Country: India
- State: Andhra Pradesh
- District: Eluru

Government
  - Type: Panchayat
  - Body: Gram Panchayat

Area
  - Total: 44.05 km^{2} (17.01 sq mi)

Population (2011)
  - Total: 14,280
  - Density: 324.2/km^{2} (839.6/sq mi)

Languages
  - Official: Telugu
- Time zone: UTC+5:30 (IST)
- Postal code: 534411
- Vehicle registration: AP

Unguturu is a village in Eluru district of the Indian state of Andhra Pradesh. It is in Unguturu mandal, Eluru district. Vasuki Sunkavalli from the village was elected Miss India Universe in 2011. It is 12 km from the nearest town, Tadepalligudem.

== Census ==
As per the 2011 census of India, the village is spread over 4405 hectares with 3912 houses and a population of 14280. The number of males in the village is 7143 and the number of females is 7137. The number of Scheduled Castes is 3349 and the number of Scheduled Tribes is 130.

== Economy ==
Agriculture

Agriculture is one of the main occupation with paddy being the main crop.
