= Settipeta =

Village in Andhra Pradesh, India

- Village
- Interactive map of Settipeta
- Location in Andhra Pradesh, India Settipeta (India)
- Coordinates: 16.8712°N 81.6706°E
- Country: India
- State: Andhra Pradesh
- District: East Godavari
- Mandal: Nidadavole mandal

Government
  - Type: Gramapanchayath

Area
  - Total: 8.43 km^{2} (3.25 sq mi)
- Elevation: 18 m (59 ft)

Population (2011)
  - Total: 4,360
  - Density: 517/km^{2} (1,340/sq mi)

Languages
  - Official: Telugu
- Time zone: UTC+05:30 (IST)
- Postal code: 534 301

Settipeta is a small village in Andhra Pradesh state of India. It comes under Nidadavole mandal, East Godavari district. It is located in between Tanuku and Nidadavole. People speak Telugu language here.

- The nearest railway stations are Kaldhari and Nidadavole.
- Nearest Airport is Rajahmundry airport.

Velivennu is the neighboring village of Settipeta. The nearest town is Nidadavole.

== Demographics ==
As of 2011 Census of India, Settipeta has population of 4,360 of which 2,187 are males while 2,173 are females. Average Sex Ratio of Settipeta village is 994. Population of children with age 0-6 is 438 which makes up 10.05% of total population of village. Literacy rate of Settipeta village was 75.52%.
