= Krishnampalem =

Krishnampalem కృష్ణంపాలెం
- Village
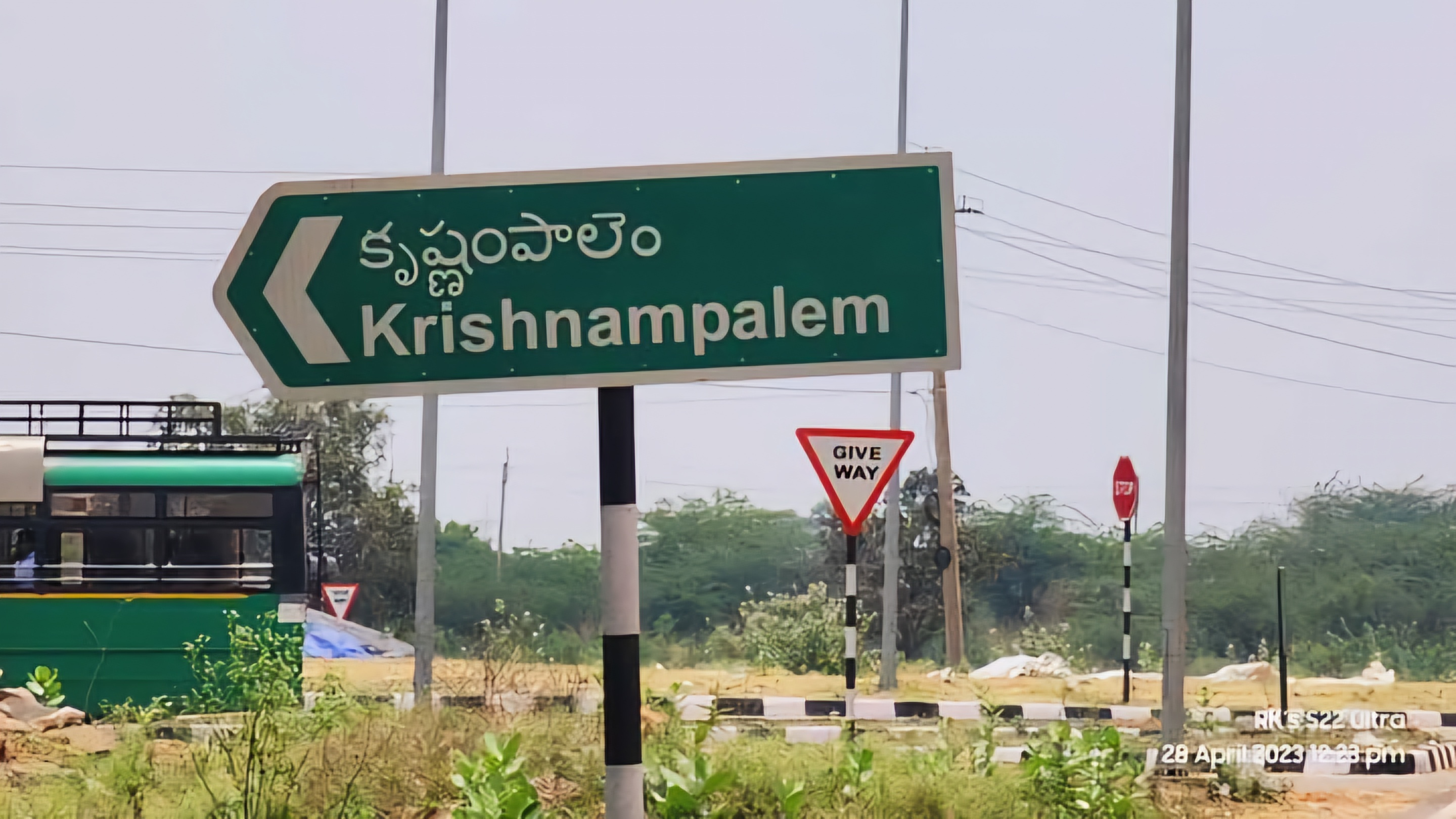
- Krishnampalem, Devarapalle, East Godavari District, Andhra Pradesh, 534313

- Krishnampalem location in Andhra Pradesh, India
- Coordinates: 16.3648°N 80.5017°E
- Country: India
- State: Andhra Pradesh
- District: East Godavari
- Mandal: Devarapalle

Government
  - Type: Panchayati Raj
  - Body: Gram Panchayat
  - Sarpanch: Sri. Naidu Durga Prasad

Population (2024)
  - Total: 1,801

Languages
  - Official: Telugu
- Time zone: UTC+5:30 (IST)
- PIN: 534313
- Vehicle registration: AP 37, AP 39, AP 40
- Lok Sabha constituency: Rajahmundry
- Vidhan Sabha constituency: Gopalapuram

Krishnampalem is a village located in the Devarapalle mandal of East Godavari District, Andhra Pradesh, India.

== Occupation ==
The primary occupation of the villagers is farming.

- Major cultivated Crops:

Paddy, Palm oil, Tobacco, Coconut

- Minorly cultivated crops:

Sugarcane, Mango, Cashew, Cocoa

== Administrative and demographic information ==
Krishnampalem falls under the jurisdiction of the Devarapalle mandal in East Godavari District. As of the 2024 census, the village has a population of 1,801 residents. The village is part of the larger Devarapalle mandal, which has a total population of 77,971 people with a literacy rate of around 60.63%.

== Local governance ==
The local governing body of Krishnampalem is the Gram Panchayat, which is responsible for the village's administration and development activities. The current Sarpanch is Sri. Naidu Durga Prasad, serving from 2021 to 2026. The Gram Panchayat is supported by various ward members who assist in the governance and implementation of policies.

=== Sarpanch ===
- Sarpanch: Sri. Naidu Durga Prasad
- Term: 2021–2026

=== Secretary ===
- Secretary Name: D Mutyam

=== Ward members ===
1. Gudala Durga Rao 2. Jakkamsetti Venkata Lakshmi 3. Kadali Hymavathi 4. Kadali Venkata Lakshmi 5. Nelapolu Naga Kumari 6. Nulu Venkata Ramana 7. Pallanti Srinivas 8. Pappu Venkateswara Rao 9. Tetela Ganapati Reddy 10. Thoradi Lalitha Kumari

== Previous governing body ==
The foundation stones have been laid over various years by the local governing body.

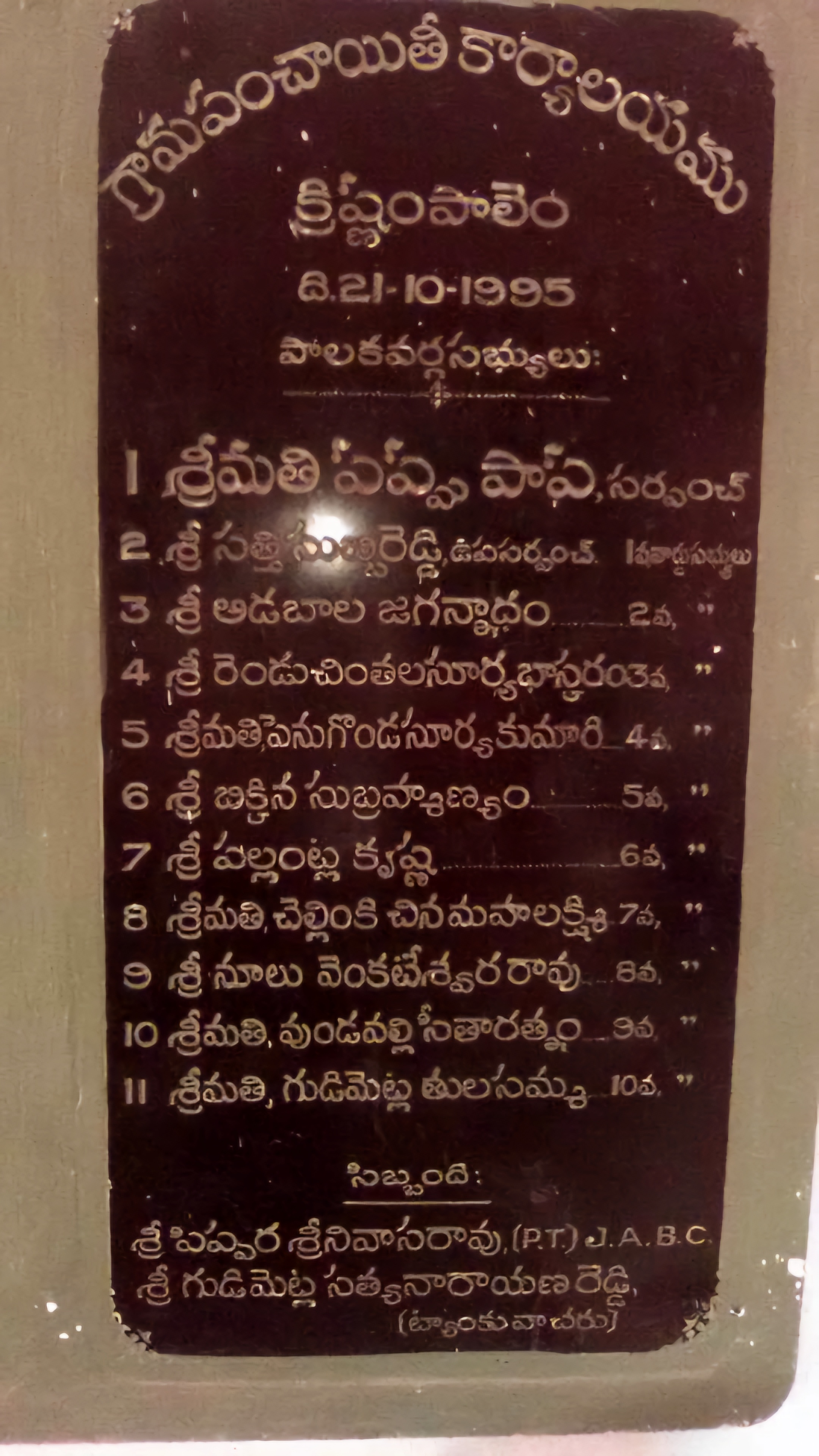
1995 - 2001 Foundation Stone

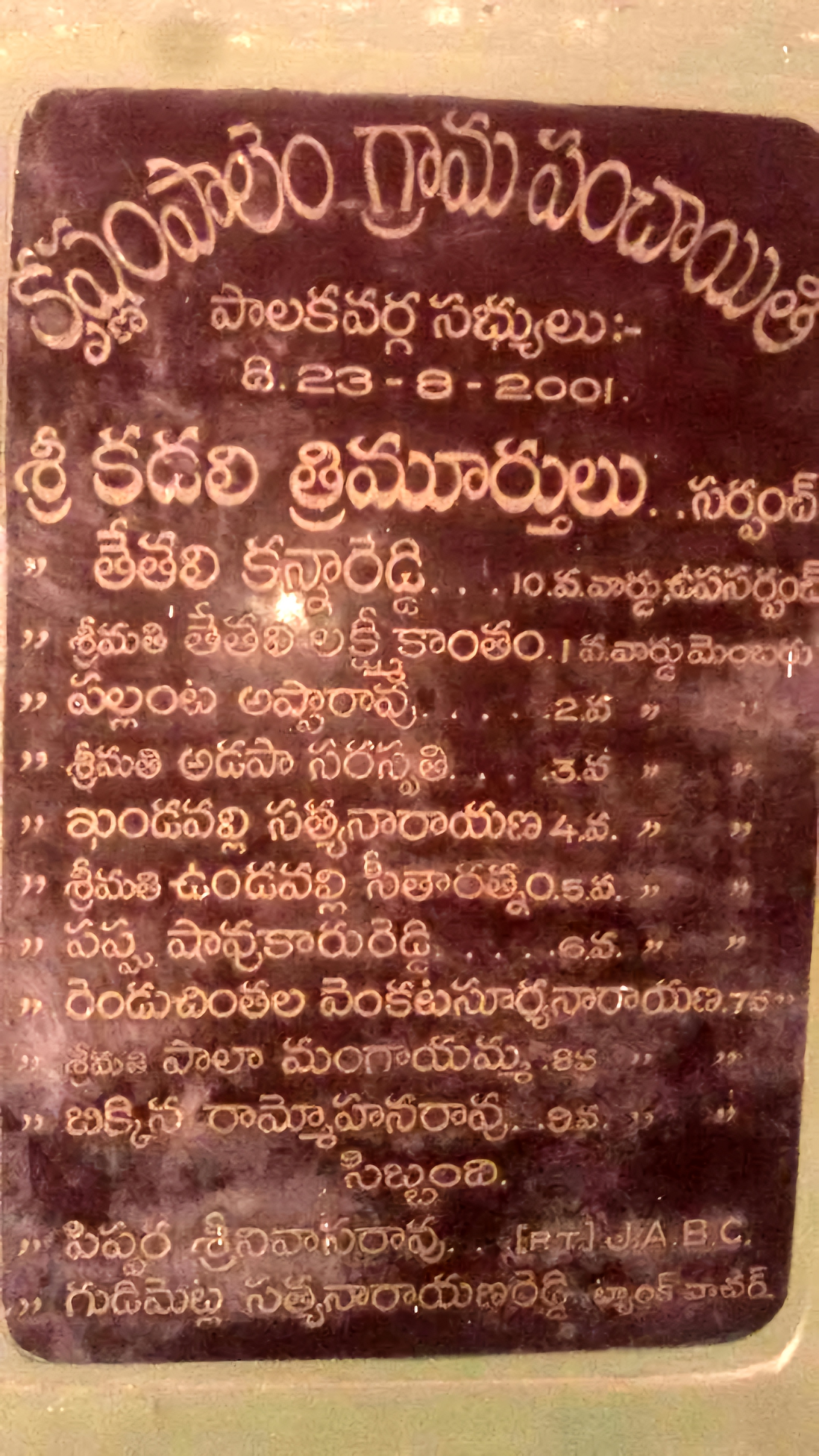
2001 - 2006 Foundation Stone

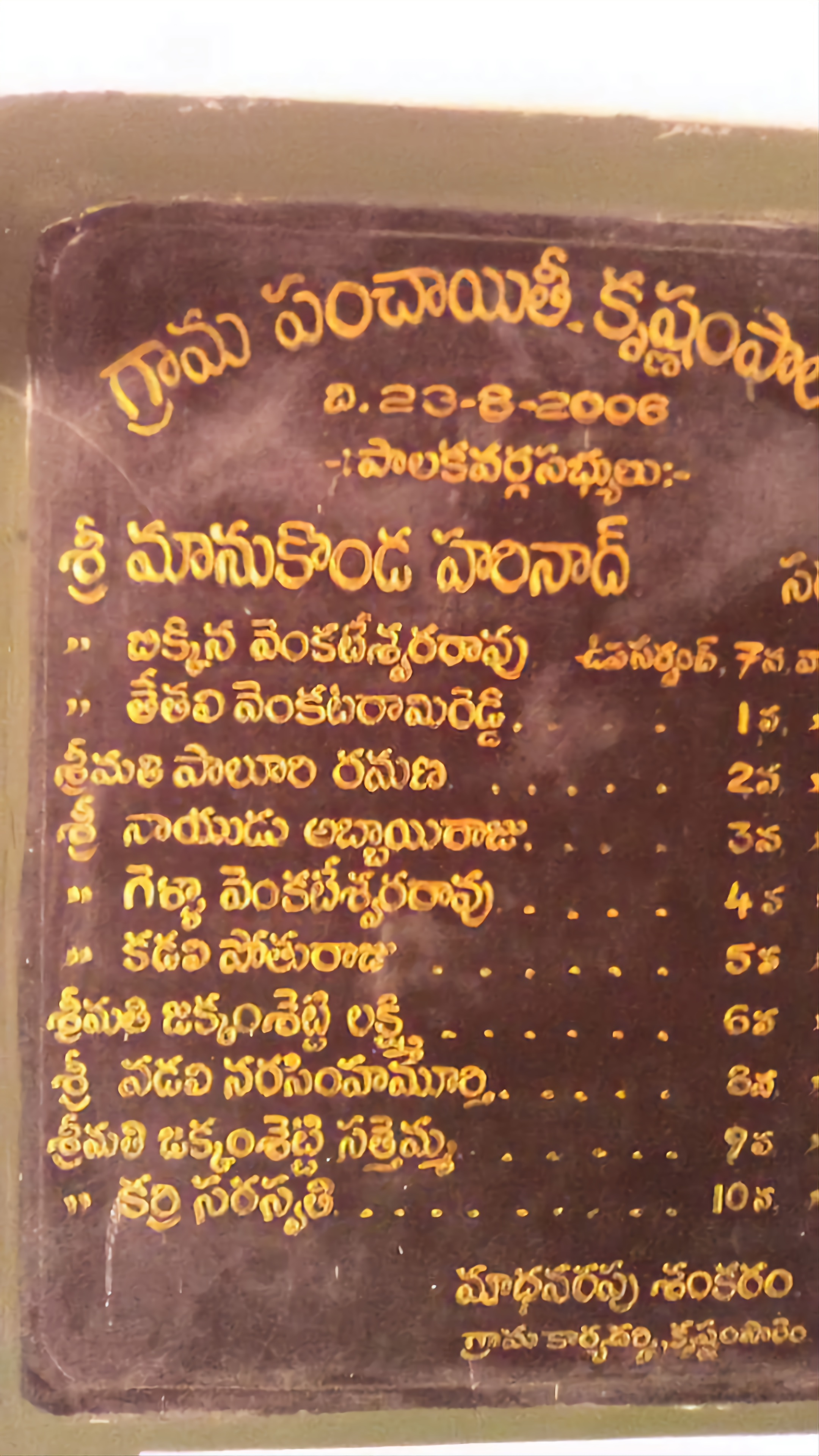
2006 - 2012 Foundation Stone

== Demographics ==
As of 2024, Krishnampalem has a total population of 1801 individuals. The population is composed of 1762 people of the general category (Plain), 3 Scheduled Castes (SC), and 36 Scheduled Tribes (ST).

| Attribute | Value |
|---|---|
| Population - Plain | 1762 |
| Population - SC | 3 |
| Population - ST | 36 |
| Population - Minority | 0 |
| Total Population | 1801 |

== Households and water supply ==
The village has 630 households with 506 house connections for water supply. The water supply infrastructure includes one Protected Water Supply (PWS) system with a supply capacity of 80,000 liters per day and one additional system (Direct Pump & Open Well) with a capacity of 31,000 liters per day.

| Attribute | Value |
|---|---|
| Households | 630 |
| House Connections | 506 |
| CPWS No | 0 |
| CPWS Supply (LPD) | 0 |
| PWS No | 1 |
| PWS Supply (LPD) | 80,000 |
| MPWS No | 0 |
| MPWS Supply (LPD) | 0 |
| Others (Direct Pump & Open Well) No | 1 |
| Others (Direct Pump & Open Well) Supply (LPD) | 31,000 |
| HP/SHP No | 0 |
| HP/SHP Supply (LPD) | 0 |

== Water plant details ==
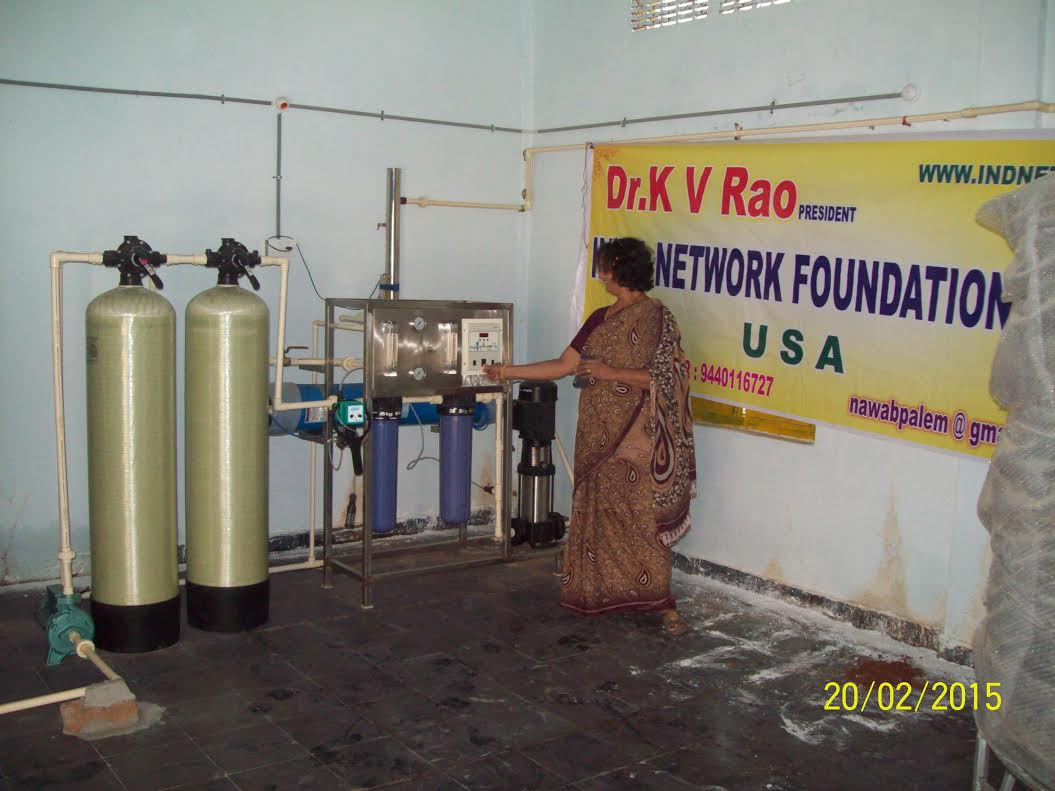
Krishnampalem Water plant Inauguration

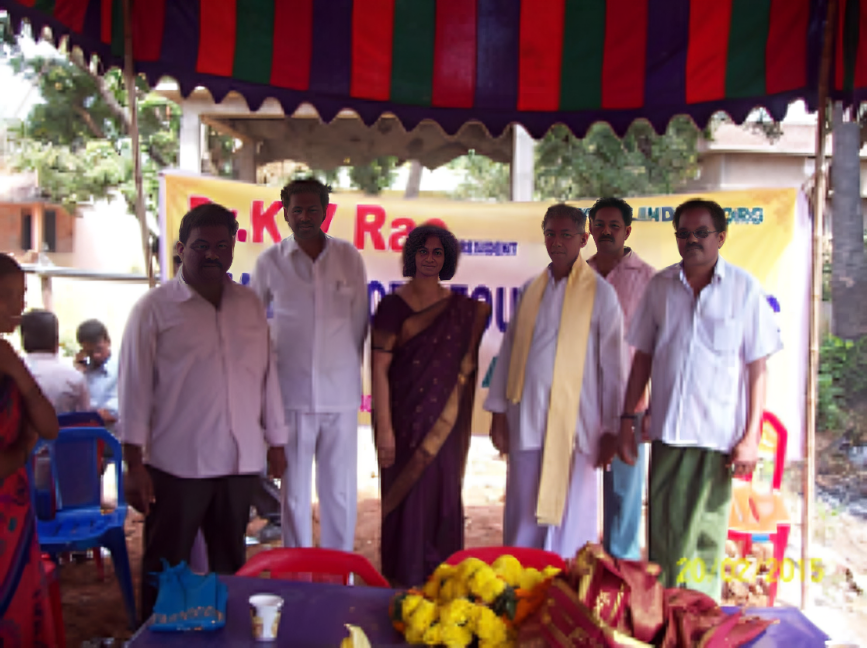
Krishnampalem Water plant Inauguration

The village of Krishnampalem has a well-structured water supply system to cater to the needs of its residents. The water supply infrastructure includes one Protected Water Supply (PWS) system and an additional water source from a Direct Pump & Open Well.

=== Protected water supply ===
The Protected Water Supply system in Krishnampalem has a supply capacity of 80,000 liters per day. This system ensures that the villagers have access to clean and safe drinking water.

| Attribute | Value |
|---|---|
| System Type | Protected Water Supply (PWS) |
| Supply Capacity (LPD) | 80,000 |

=== Direct pump and open well ===
In addition to the PWS, the village also relies on a Direct Pump & Open Well system, which has a supply capacity of 31,000 liters per day. This additional source helps in meeting the water demand of the village.

| Attribute | Value |
|---|---|
| System Type | Direct Pump & Open Well |
| Supply Capacity (LPD) | 31,000 |

=== Water storage ===
Krishnampalem is equipped with two Overhead Service Reservoirs (OHSR) that aid in the storage and distribution of water throughout the village. However, there are no Ground Level Service Reservoirs (GLSR) in the village.

| Attribute | Value |
|---|---|
| Number of OHSR | 2 |
| Number of GLSR | 0 |

=== Safe water supply ===
The village maintains a safe water supply level of 59.82 liters per capita per day (LPCD). The status of the water supply is classified as "Fully Covered" (FC), indicating that the water supply meets the required standards for safety and sufficiency.

| Attribute | Value |
|---|---|
| Safe LPCD | 59.82 |
| Coverage Status | Fully Covered (FC) |

== Facilities and landmarks ==
=== Post office ===
The Krishnampalem Post Office operates as a Branch Office with the PIN code 534313. It offers a range of services including mail delivery, parcel services, financial services, and retail services. The office is part of the Tadepalligudem postal division under the Vijayawada region of the Andhra Pradesh postal circle.

=== Schools ===
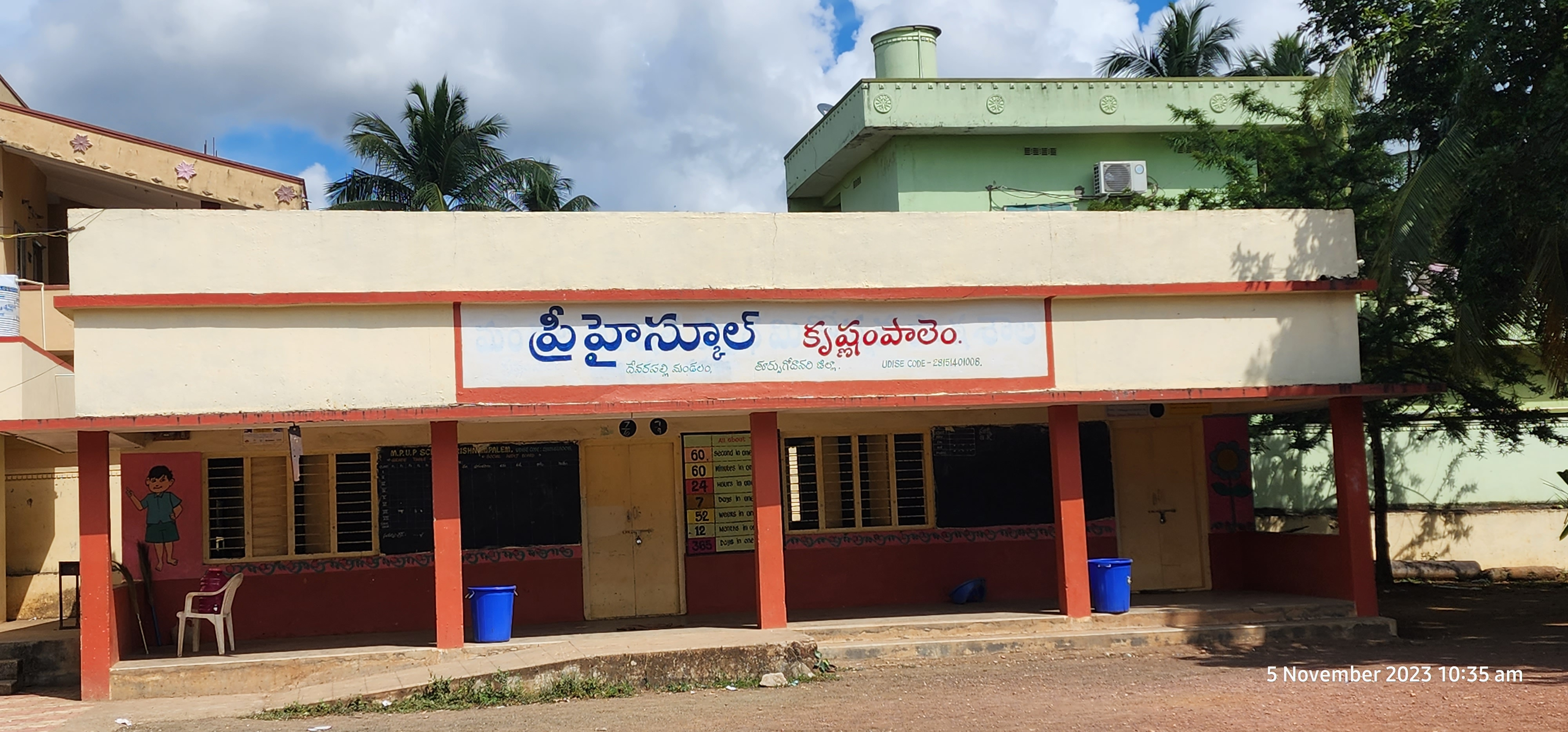
Krishnampalem MPUPS

The primary educational institution in Krishnampalem is the MPUPS Krishnampalem, established in 1940. It caters to grades 1 to 8 and has a total of 8 teachers. The medium of instruction is Telugu.

== Notable Personalities from this Village ==
=== Mylavarapu Suryanarayana Murthy (మైలవరపు సూర్యనారాయణమూర్తి) ===
Mylavarapu Suryanarayana Murthy is a distinguished literary figure from Andhra Pradesh, known for his significant contributions to Telugu literature. His renowned work, "ఆంధ్ర తులసీరామాయణము అను రామచరితమానసము (ఉత్తరకాండము)," is a poetic retelling of the Ramayana, specifically the Uttarakanda section. This text is an important part of the "Rama Charita Manas" and holds a significant place in Telugu literary history.

=== Temples ===
Krishnampalem hosts several temples, including:

* Shivalayam

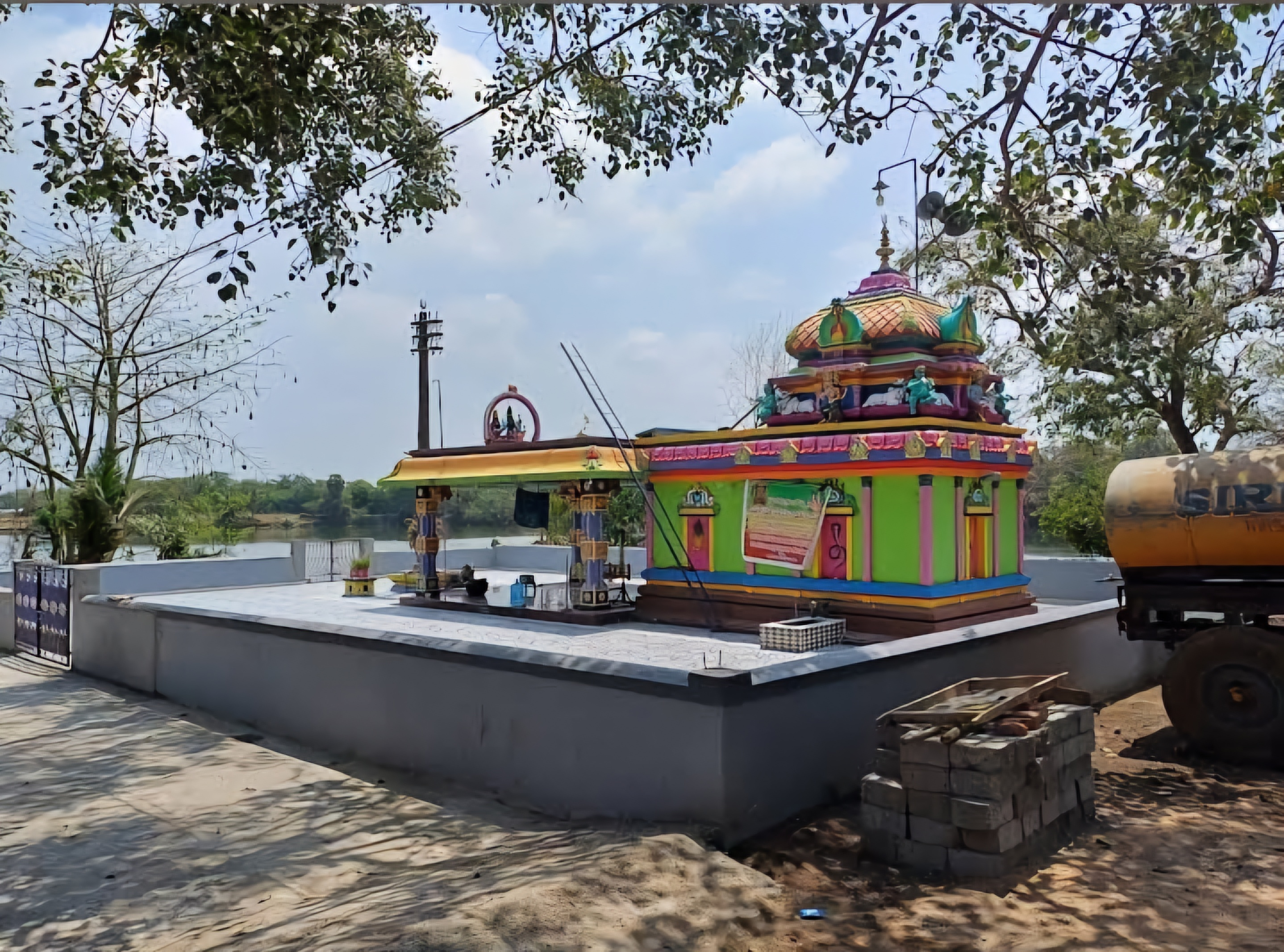
శివాలయం వెలుపలి దృశ్యం

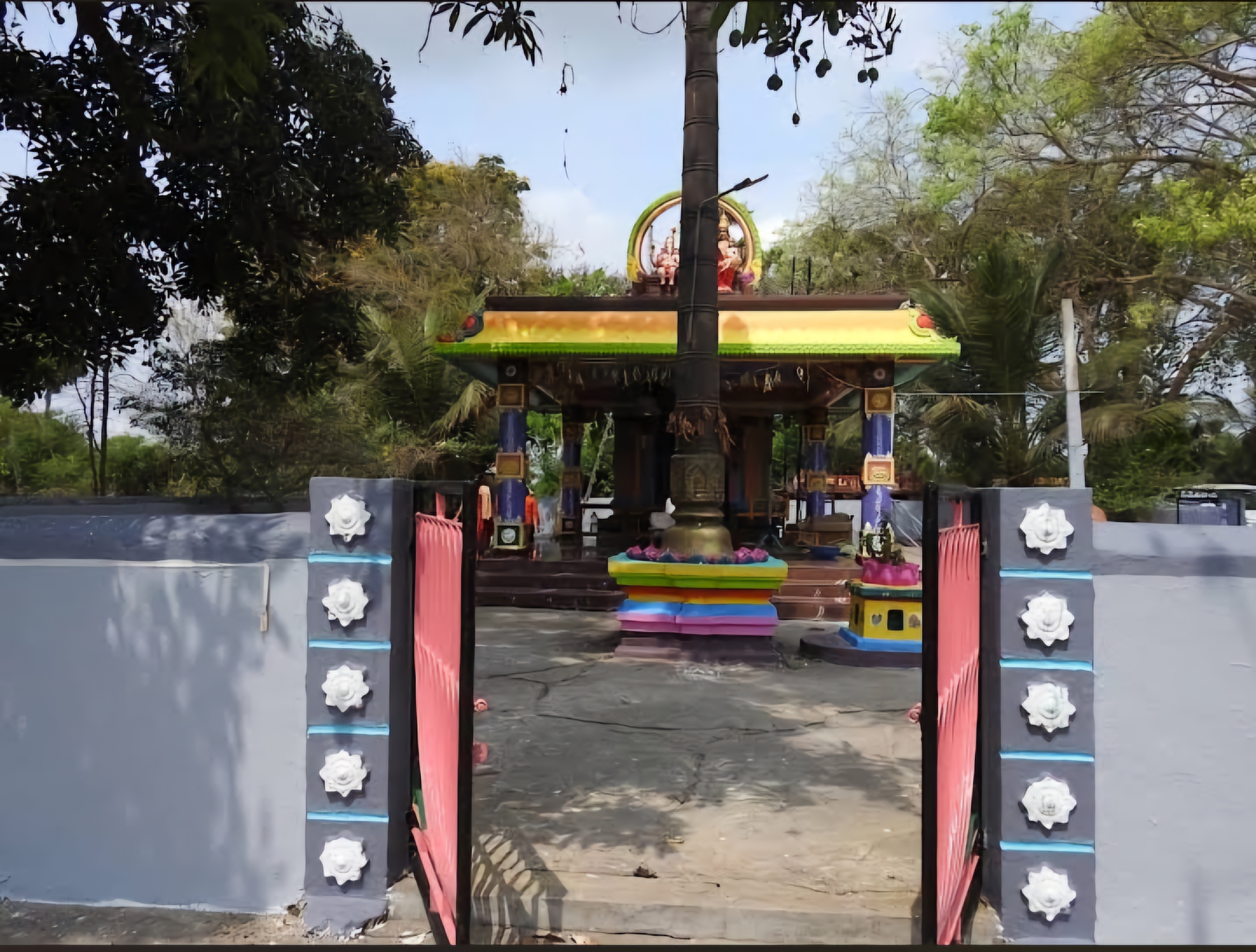
శివాలయం వెలుపలి దృశ్యం

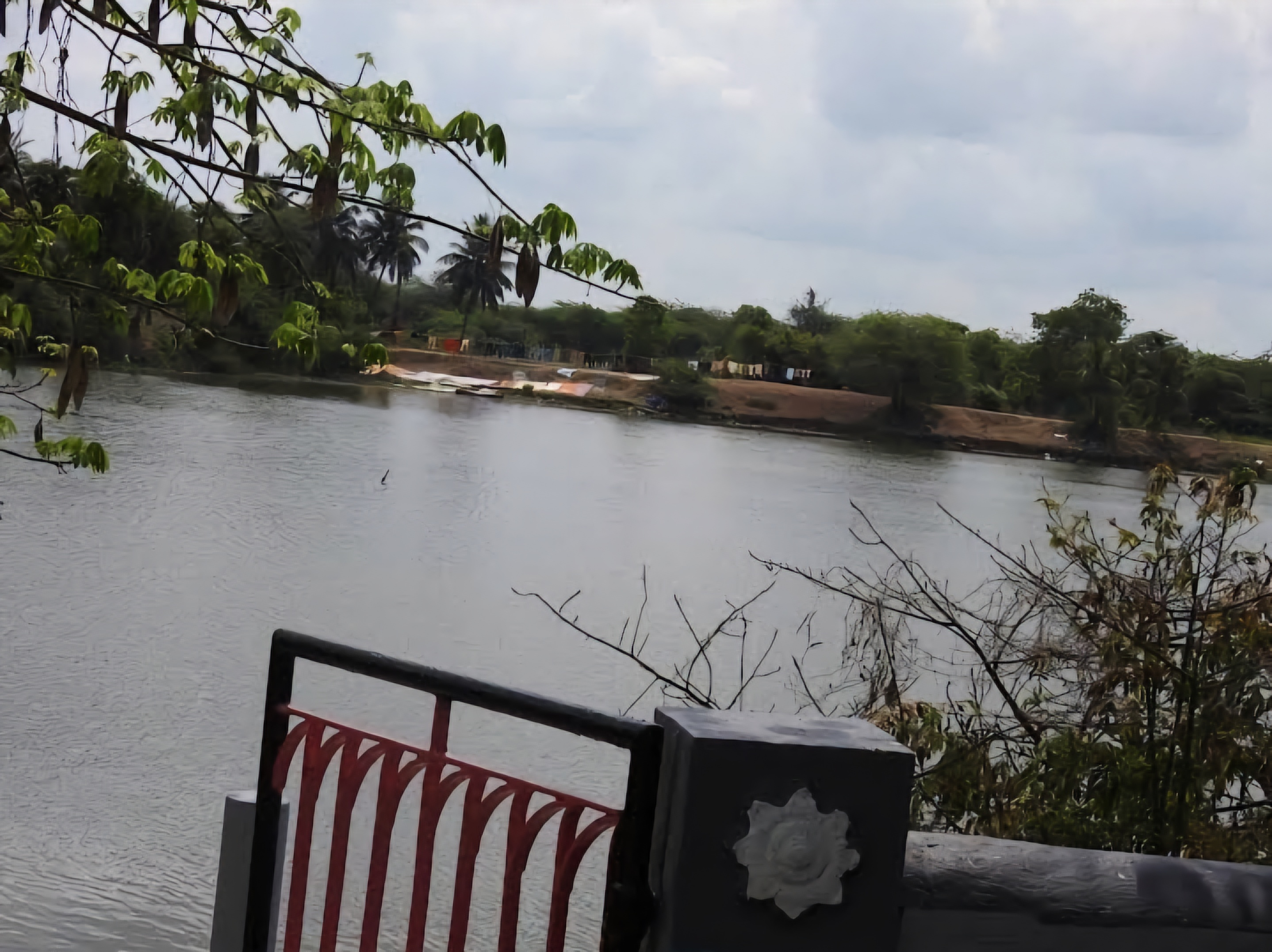
కృష్ణంపాలెం మంచినీటి చెరువు, శివాలయం దగ్గర

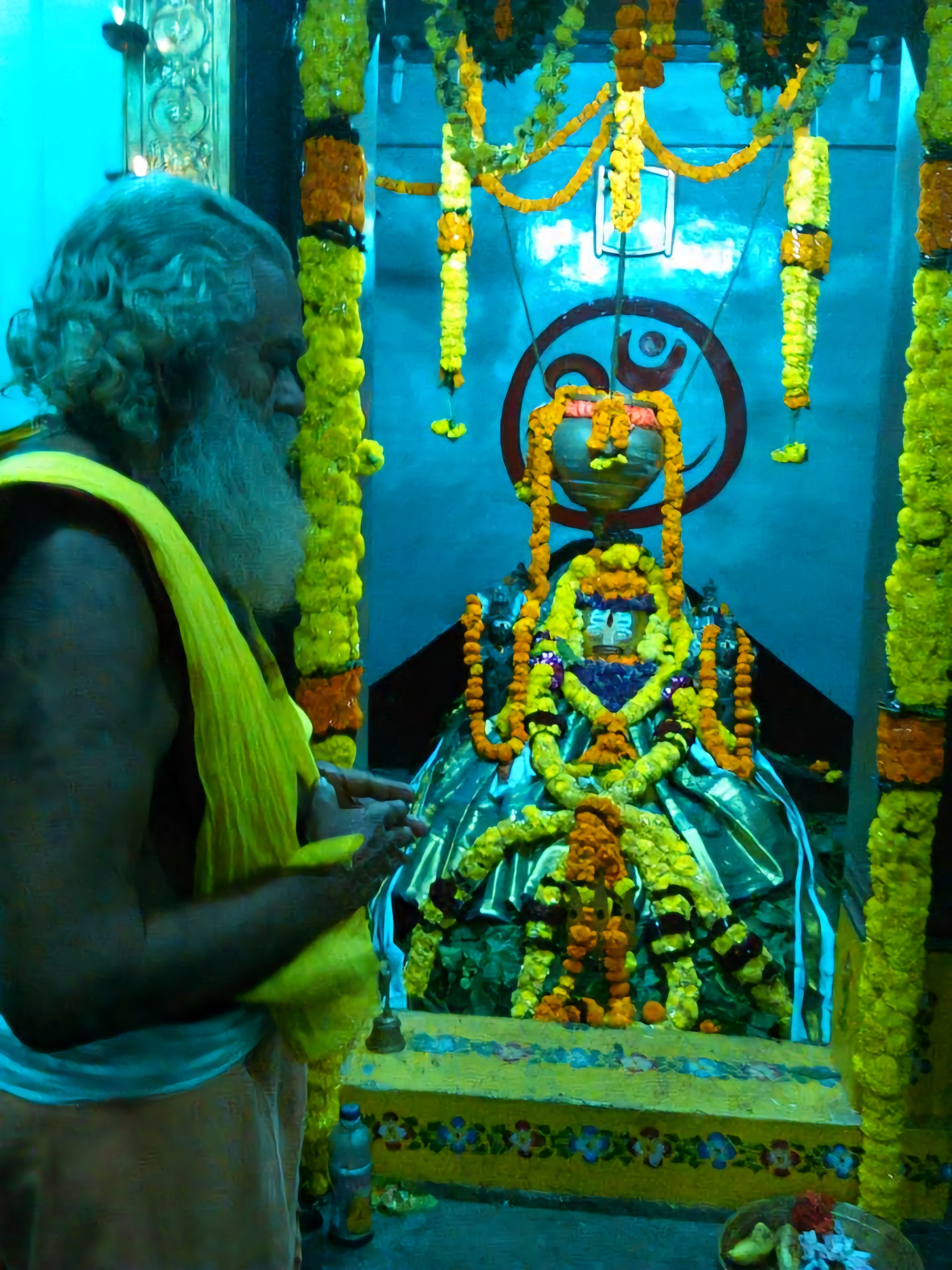
శ్రీ ఉమా రామలింగేశ్వర స్వామి విగ్రహాలు

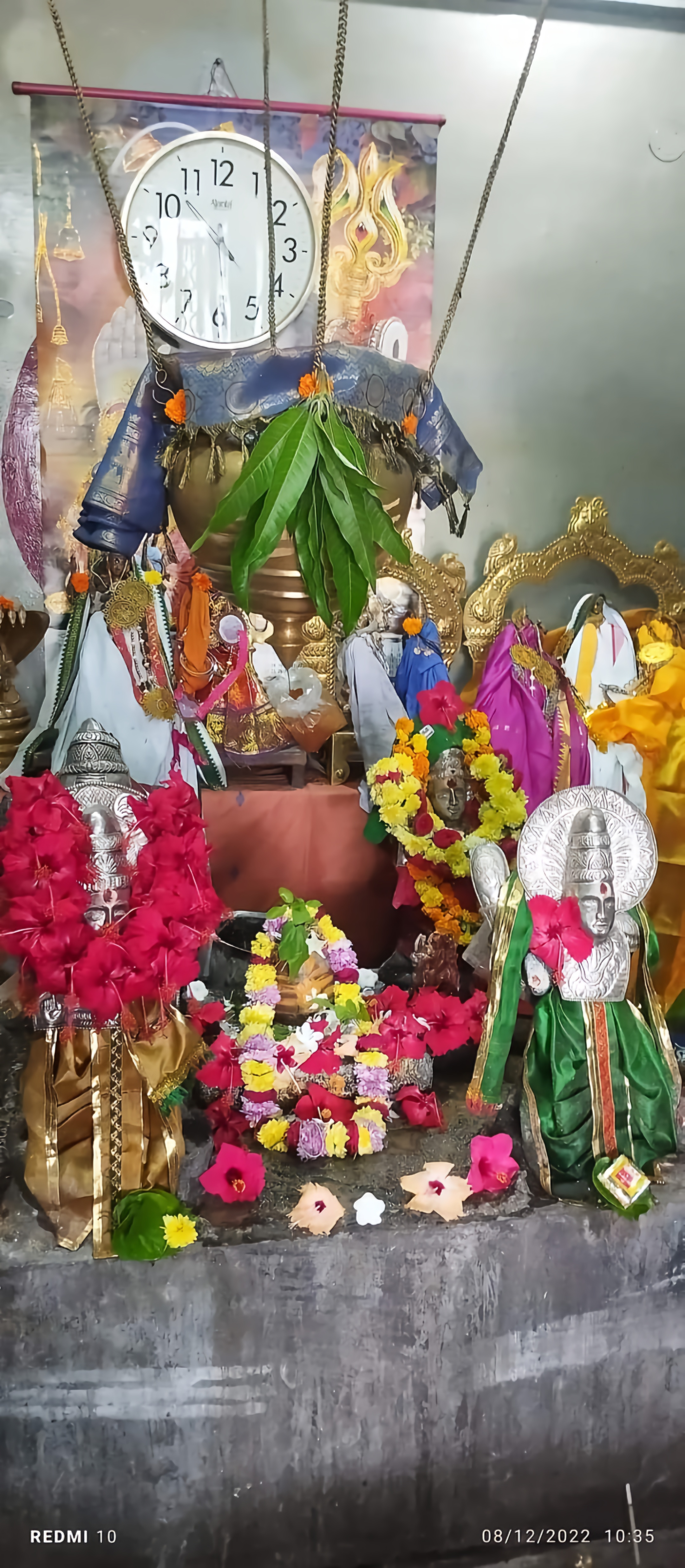
శ్రీ ఉమా రామలింగేశ్వర స్వామి విగ్రహాలు

* Ramalayam

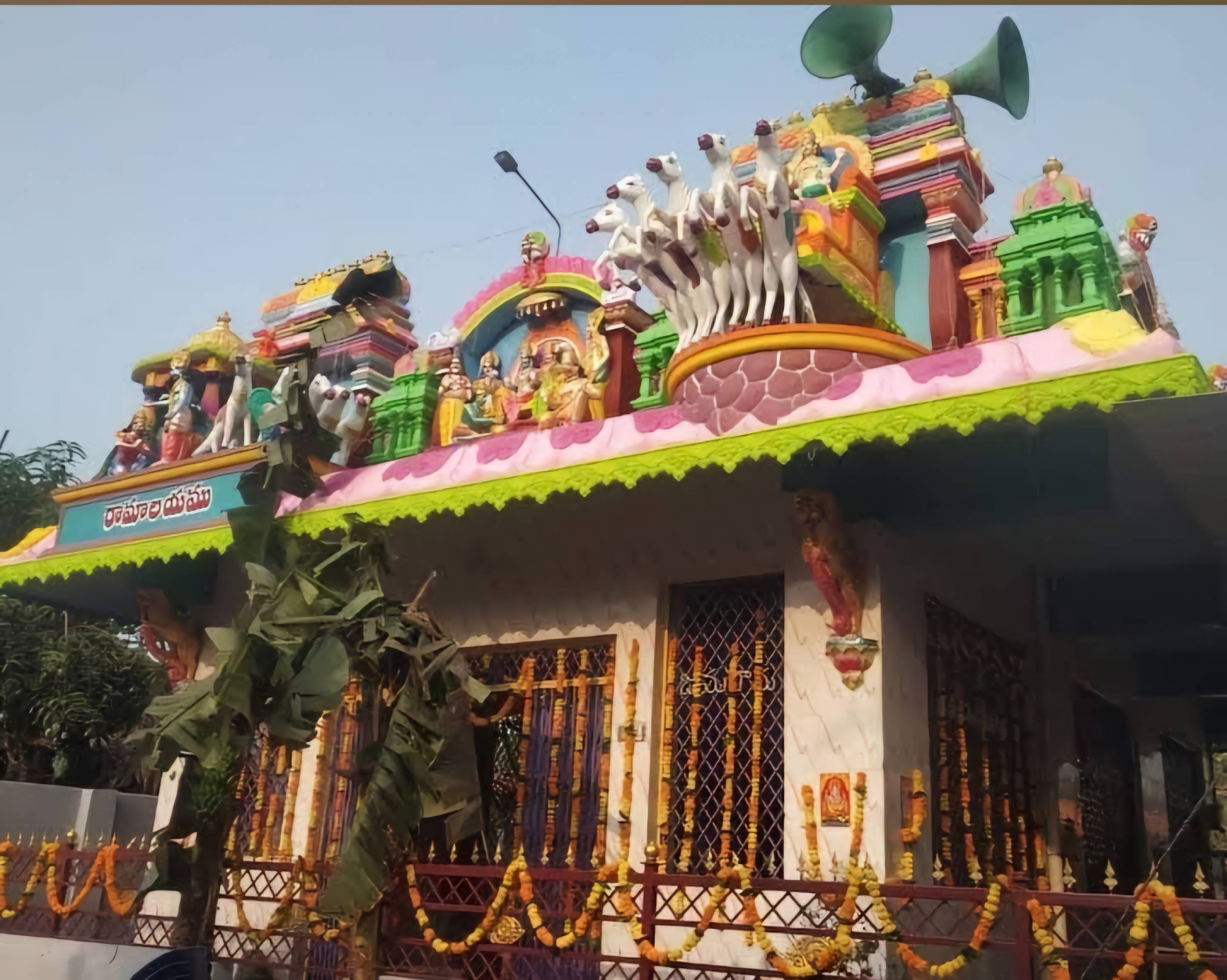
కృష్ణపాలెం కోదండ రామాలయం వెలుపలి దృశ్యం

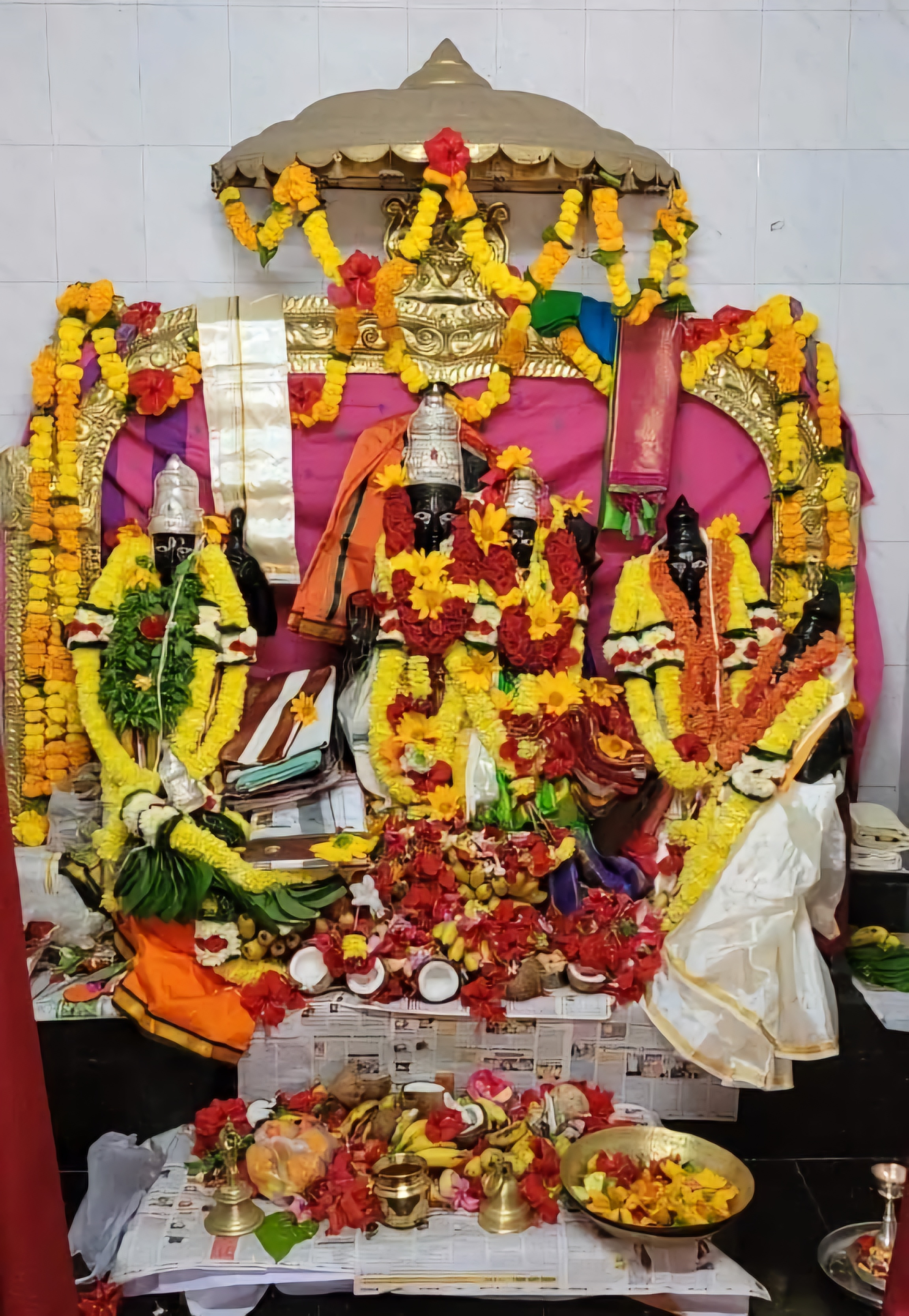
కృష్ణపాలెం రామ మందిరంలో సీతా రాముల విగ్రహాలు

* Anjaneyaswami Temple

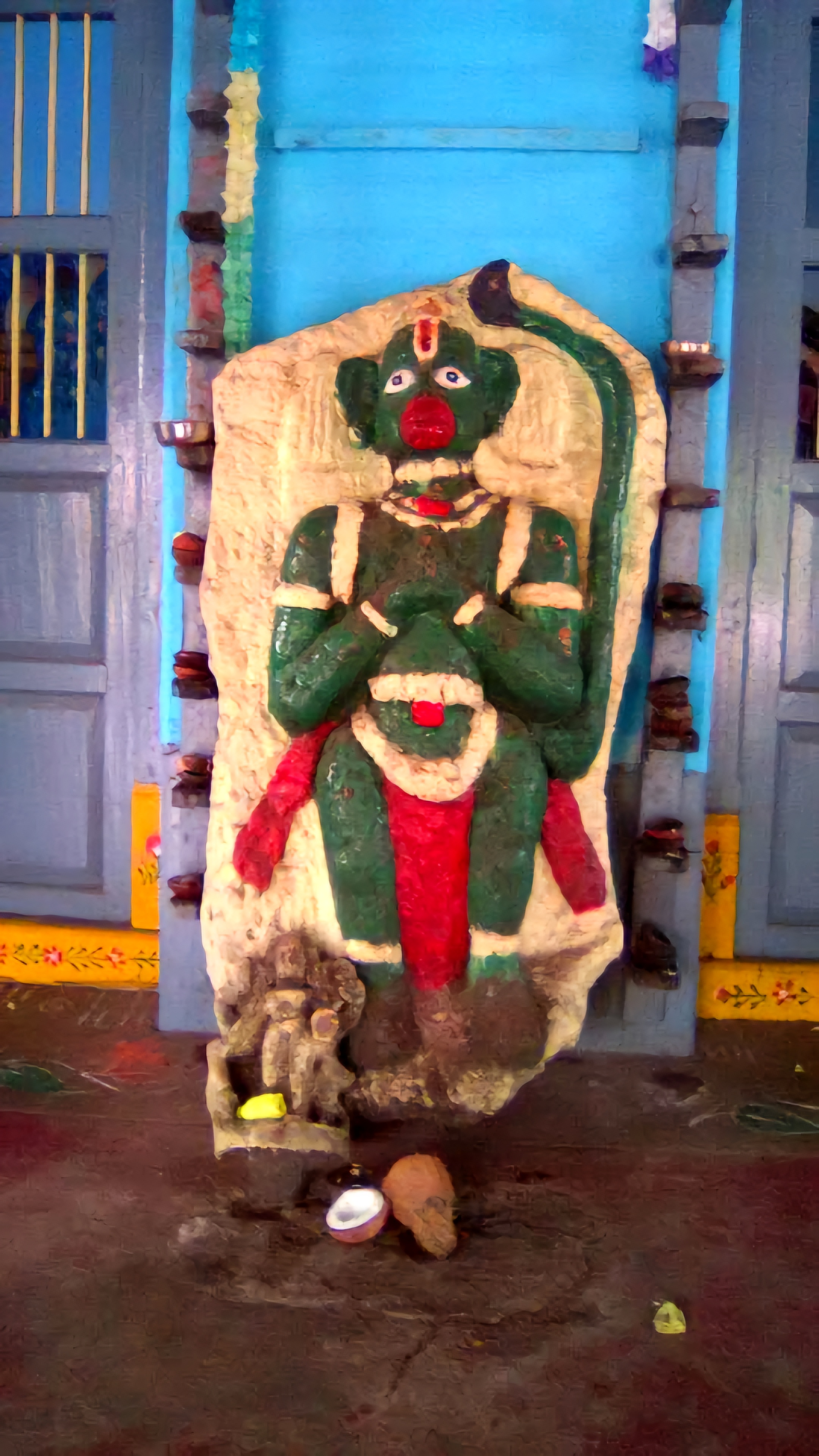
Krishnampalem Hanuman Statue

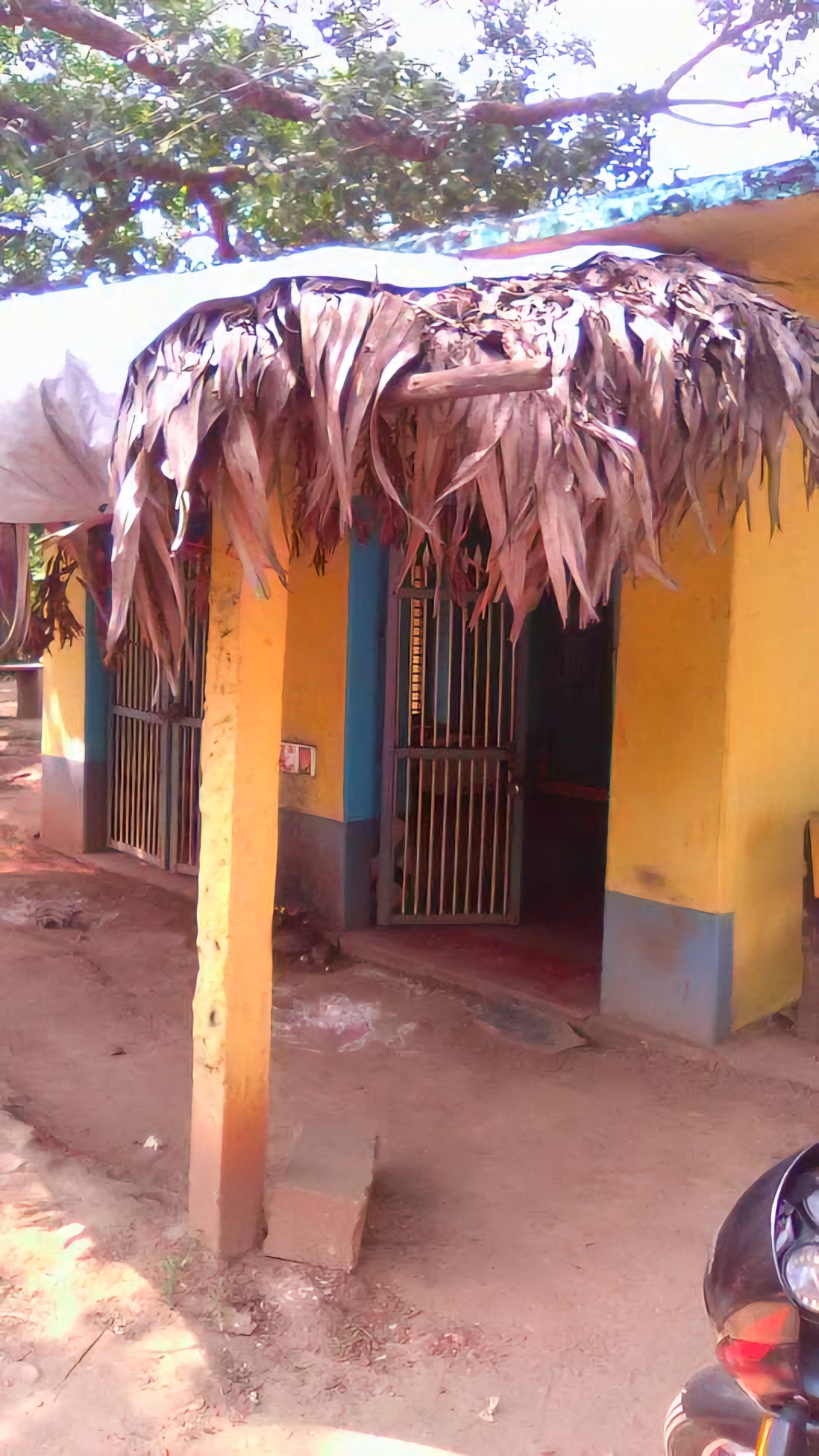
Anjaneya swami Temple

* Kadiyalamma Temple

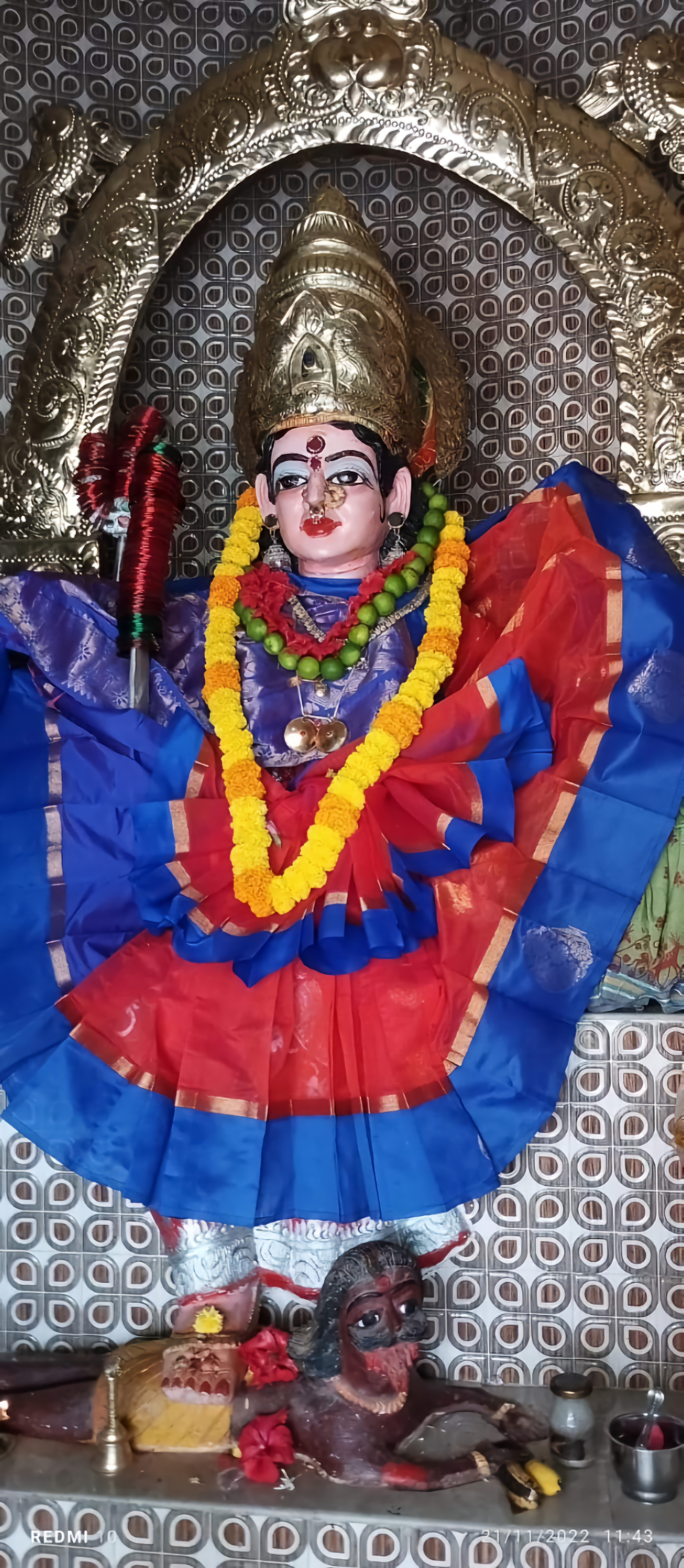
కృష్ణంపాలెం శ్రీ కడియాలమ్మ విగ్రహం

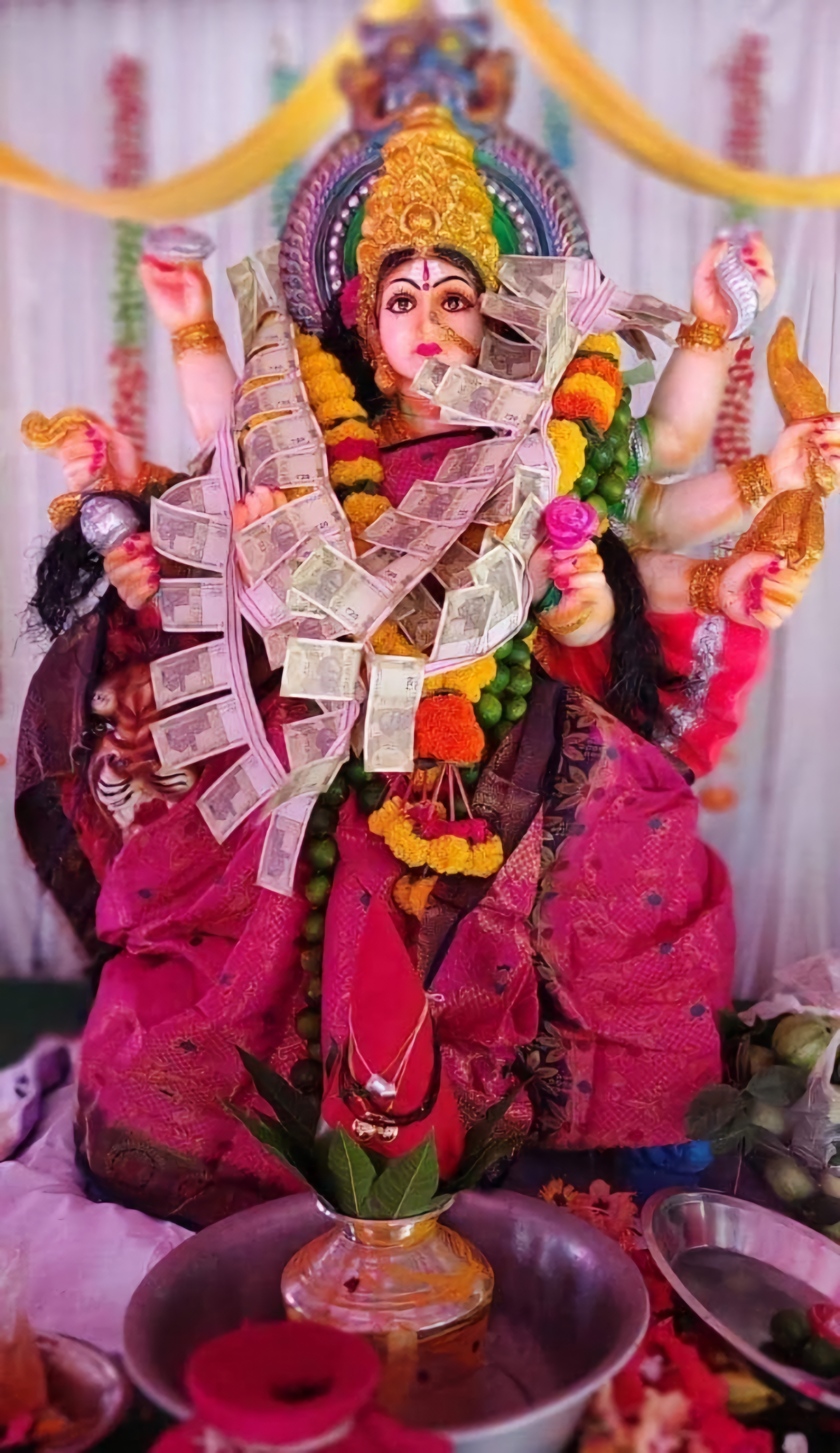
కృష్ణంపాలెం శ్రీ కడియాలమ్మ విగ్రహం

== Nearby villages and towns ==
=== Nearby villages ===
- Bandapuram
- Chinnayagudem
- Devarapalle
- Dhumanthunigudem
- Duddukuru
- Gowripatnam
- Kondagudem
- Kurukuru
- Laxmipuram
- Pallantla
- Tyajampudi
- Yadavole
- Yernagudem
- Sangaigudem
- Gandhinagaram

=== Nearby towns ===
- Devarapalle
- Kovvur
- Rajahmundry
- Nidadavole
- Tadepalligudem
- Eluru
- Tanuku
- Bhimavaram
- Jangareddygudem

== Transportation ==
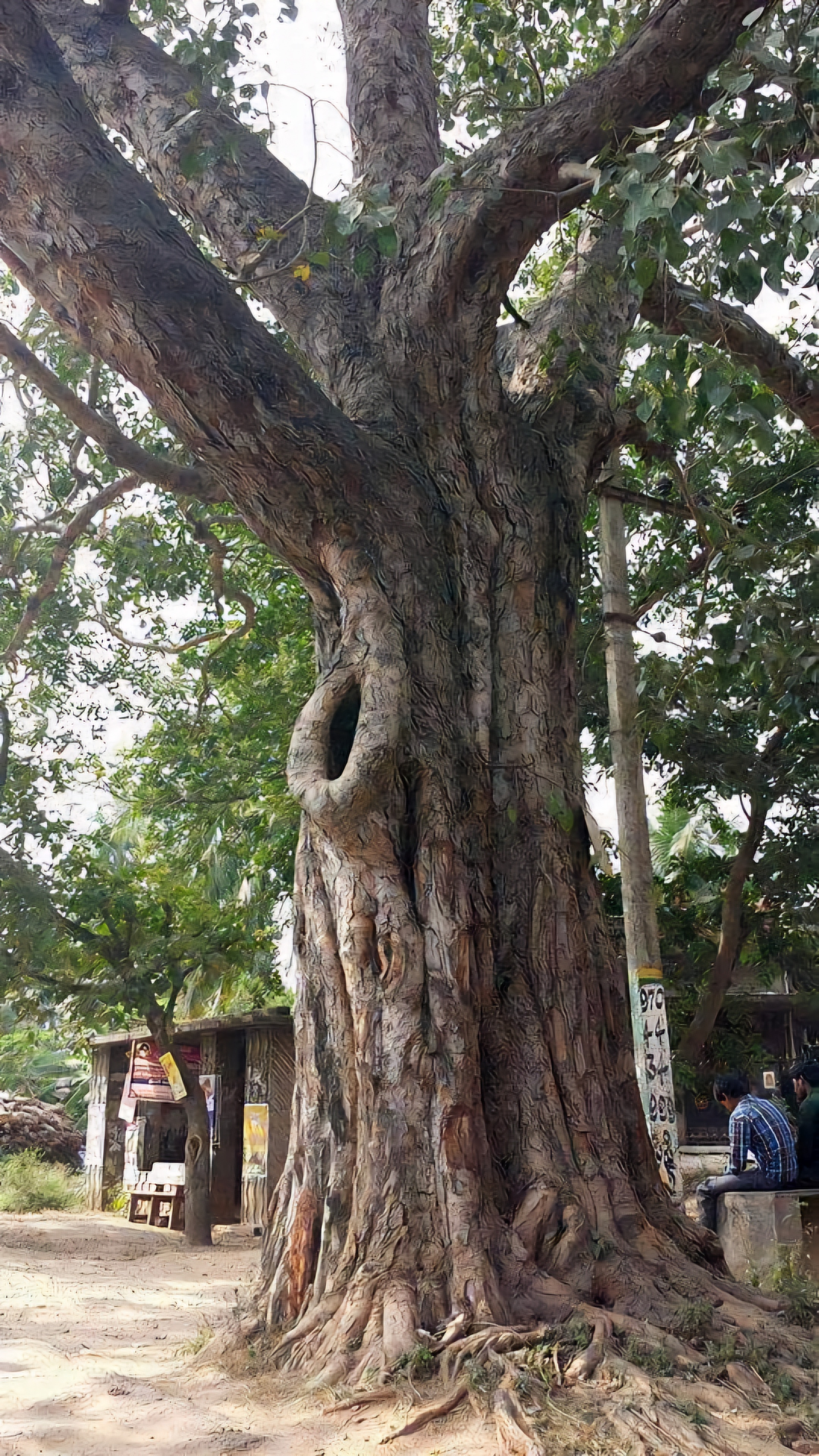
A bus stop in Krishnampalem

Krishnampalem is well-connected by road with nearby villages and towns. Major highways passing near the village include GNT Road (NH16) and the upcoming Greenfield Highway.

== Nearby airports and railway stations ==
Krishnampalem is accessible through several nearby airports and railway stations, enhancing connectivity for residents and visitors.

=== Nearby airports ===
1. Rajahmundry Airport (RJA) - Located approximately 45 kilometers from Krishnampalem, this airport offers flights to major cities like Hyderabad, Chennai, and Bengaluru. 2. Vijayawada Airport (VGA) - Situated around 100 kilometers away, Vijayawada Airport connects to various national and international destinations. 3. Alluri Sitarama Raju International Airport (VTZ) - About 180 kilometers from the village, this is a major airport offering extensive domestic and international flight options.

=== Nearby railway stations ===
1. Kovvur Railway Station - Approximately 28 kilometers away, this station offers regional connectivity with trains to major cities. 2. Rajahmundry Railway Station - Situated around 36 kilometers from the village, Rajahmundry Railway Station is a major hub with frequent trains to major cities across India. 3. Nidadavole Junction - Located about 25 kilometers away, this junction connects various lines, facilitating travel to different parts of the country.
