= Chagallu =

Chagallu may refer to:

- Chagallu, West Godavari district, a village in West Godavari district, Andhra Pradesh, India
- Chagallu, Guntur district, a village in Guntur district, Andhra Pradesh, India
