= Brahmanagudem railway station =

Railway station in Andhra Pradesh

Brahmanagudem
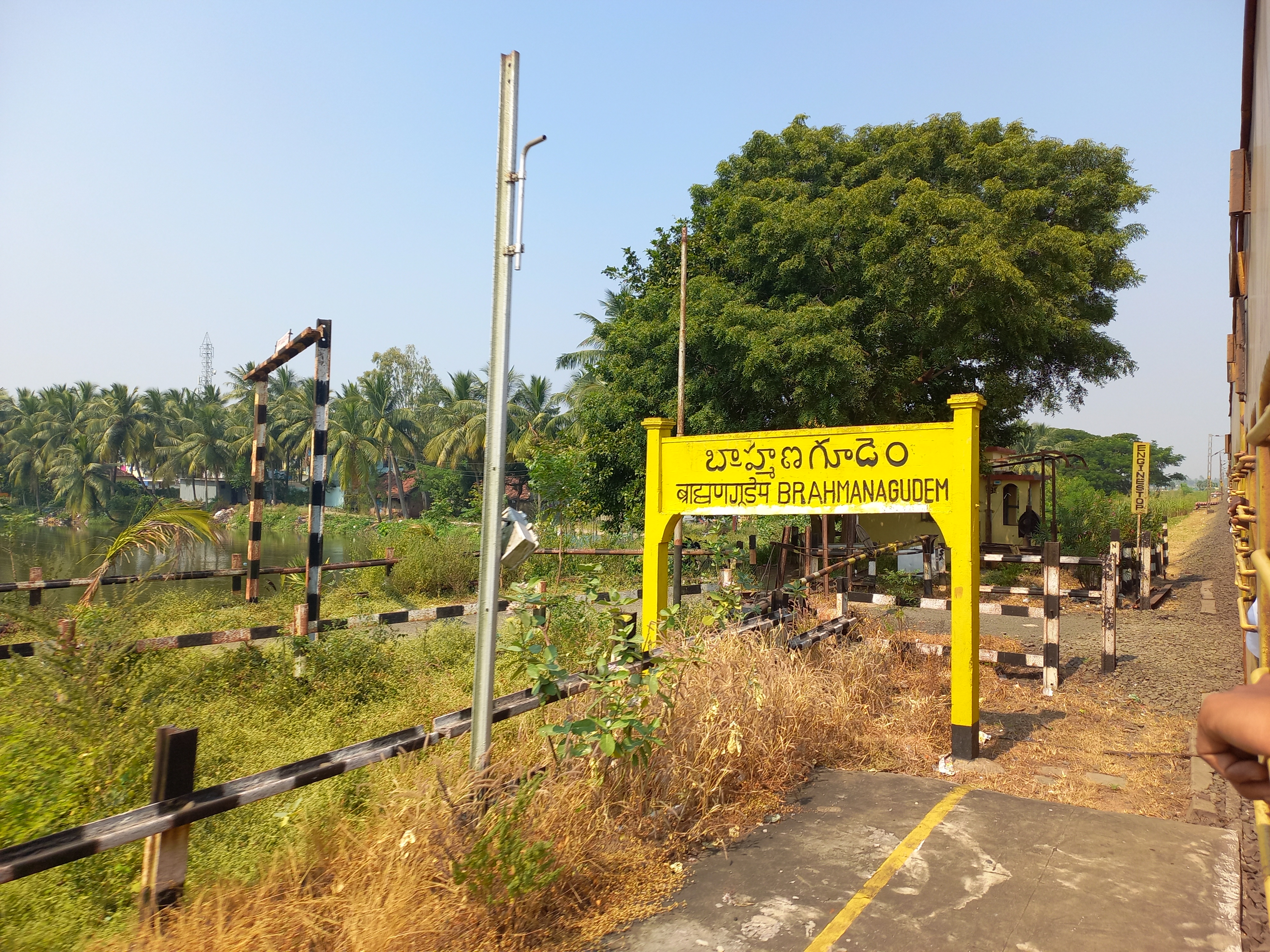

General information
- Location: Brahmanagudem, East Godavari district, Andhra Pradesh; India
- Coordinates: 16°56′05″N 81°40′30″E
- Elevation: 17 m (56 ft)
- System: Passenger train station
- Owner: Indian Railways
- Operator: South Coast Railway zone
- Line: Visakhapatnam–Vijayawada section of Howrah–Chennai main line and
- Platforms: 2
- Tracks: 2 1,676 mm (5 ft 6 in)

Construction
- Structure type: Standard (on-ground station)
- Parking: Available

Other information
- Status: Functioning
- Station code: BMGM
- Zone(s): South Coast Railway zone
- Division(s): Vijayawada

History
- Electrified: 25 kV AC 50 Hz OHLE
Location
- Location within Andhra Pradesh

Brahmanagudem is an Indian Railways station near Brahmanagudem, a village in the East Godavari district of Andhra Pradesh. It lies on the Vijayawada–Visakhapatnam section and is administered under the Vijayawada railway division of the South Coast Railway Zone. Ten trains halt at this station every day. It is the 3164th-busiest station in the country.

== History ==
Between 1893 and 1896, 1,288 km (800 mi) of the East Coast State Railway, between Vijayawada and BMGMttack were opened for traffic. The southern part of the West Coast State Railway (from Waltair to Vijayawada) was taken over by the Madras Railway in 1901.

| Preceding station | Indian Railways | Following station |
|---|---|---|
| Chagallu towards ? | South Coast Railway zone Visakhapatnam–Vijayawada section of Howrah–Chennai main line | Nidadavolu Junction towards ? |
