= Chirla Jaggi Reddy =

Indian politician (born 1978)

Member of Andhra Pradesh Legislative Assembly
- In office 2014–2024
- Preceded by: Bandaru Satyananda Rao
- Succeeded by: Bandaru Satyananda Rao
- Constituency: Kothapeta
- In office 2004–2009
- Preceded by: Bandaru Satyananda Rao
- Succeeded by: Bandaru Satyananda Rao
- Constituency: Kothapeta

Personal details
- Born: 1978 (age 47–48) Gopalapuram
- Party: YSR Congress Party
- Occupation: Politician

Chirla Jaggi Reddy (born 1978) is an Indian politician from Andhra Pradesh. He is a three-time MLA from Kothapeta. He lost the 2024 Andhra Pradesh Legislative Assembly Election on YSR Congress Party ticket from Kothapeta Assembly Constituency in East Godavari district.

== Early life and education ==
Reddy was born in Gopalapuram village, East Godavari District. His father’s name is Soma Sundara Reddy. He completed his MBA from New Port University, Bengaluru. He is a businessman.

== Career ==
Reddy started his political journey with Indian National Congress. He won the Kothapeta seat in the 2004 Andhra Pradesh Legislative Assembly Election representing Congress. He was elected again in 2014 from the same constituency representing YSRCP despite a wave in favour of TDP. He became a third-time MLA from Kothapeta when he was re-elected as YSRCP candidate in 2019. He won the 2019 Andhra Pradesh Legislative Assembly Election defeating Bandaru Satyananda Rao of Telugu Desam Party by a margin of 4038 votes.

He served as the chairman of the Andhra Pradesh Public Undertakings Committee. In December 2022, he took out a padayathra from Tirumala temple in Tirupati to Srisailam temple seeking the blessings of the Almighty to retain Jagan Mohan Reddy in power.

In January 2024, Reddy inaugurated the Prabhala Utsav festival at Kothapeta on Makar Sankranthi day. The procession through the main streets of Kothapeta is an annual affair and is celebrated as Jagannathota Prabhala Theertham in Konaseema region of Andhra Pradesh.
