= Undrajavaram mandal =

- Mandal
- Interactive Map Outlining mandal
- Location in Andhra Pradesh, India
- Country: India
- State: Andhra Pradesh
- District: East Godavari

Area
  - Total: 81.29 km^{2} (31.39 sq mi)

Population (2011)
  - Total: 37,774
  - Density: 464.7/km^{2} (1,204/sq mi)

Languages
  - Official: Telugu
- Time zone: UTC+5:30 (IST)

Undrajavaram mandal is one of the 19 mandals in East Godavari district of the Indian state of Andhra Pradesh having population of 37,774 as of 2011 census. It is administered under Kovvur revenue division and its headquarters are located at Undrajavaram.

== Towns and villages ==
As of 2011 census, the mandal has 15 settlements. Undrajavaram is the most populated and Dammennu is the least populated village in the mandal.

The settlements in the mandal are listed below:

1. Kaldhari
2. Velivennu
3. Dammennu
4. Mortha
5. Chilakapadu
6. Pasalapudi
7. Suryaraopalem
8. Vadluru
9. Satyawada
10. Chivatam
11. Karravarisavaram
12. Palangi
13. Undrajavaram
14. Velagadurru
15. Tadiparru

== See also ==
- East Godavari district
