= Nidadavolu Junction railway station =

Railway station in Andhra Pradesh

Nidadavolu Junction
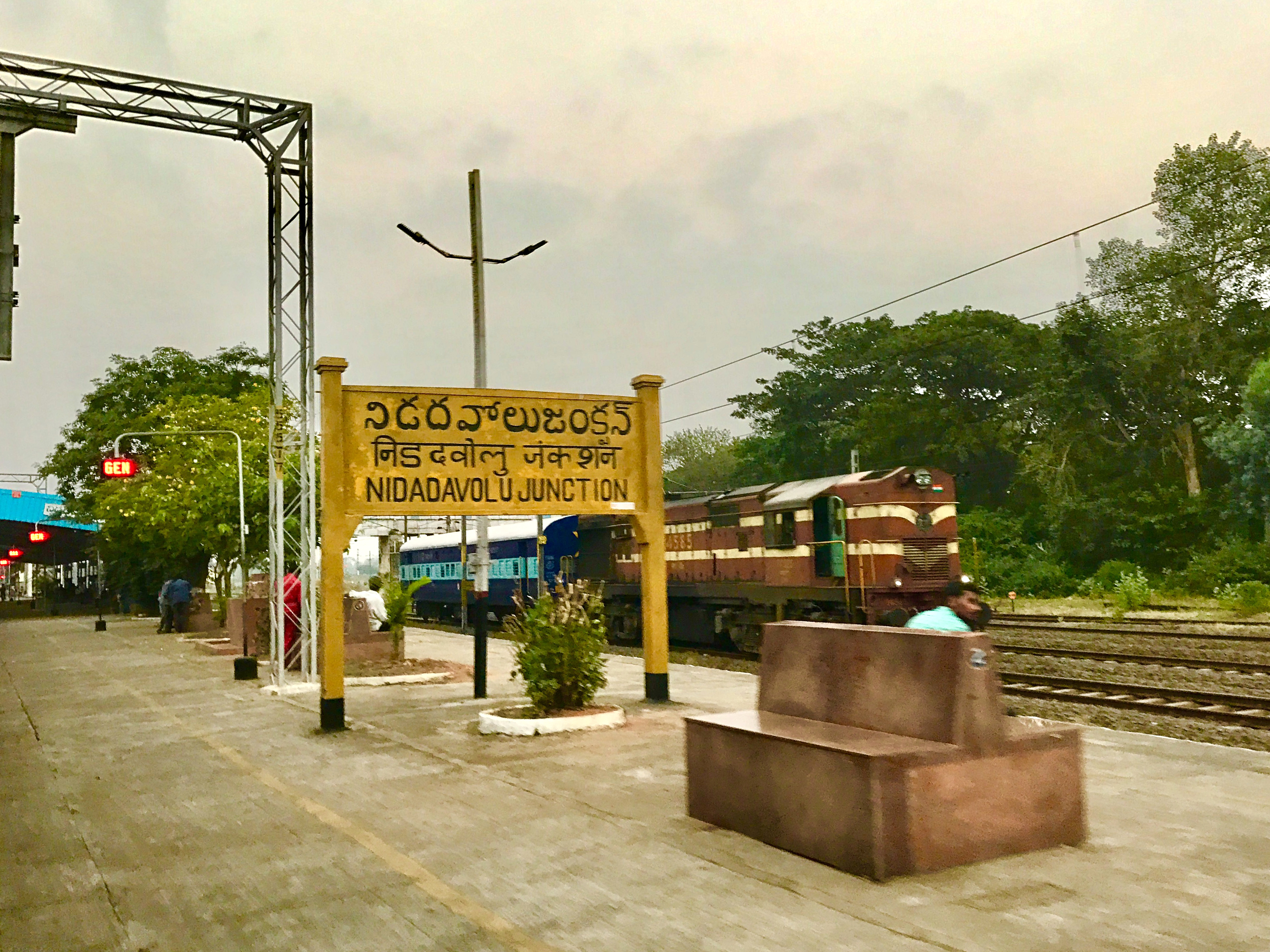
- Nidadavolu railway station main entrance

General information
- Location: Main road, Nidadavolu, East Godavari district, Andhra Pradesh; India
- Coordinates: 16.89770°N 81.67444°E
- System: Indian Railways junction station
- Operator: Indian Railways
- Lines: Howrah–Chennai main line Visakhapatnam–Vijayawada section
- Platforms: 5
- Tracks: 5 5 ft 6 in (1,676 mm) broad gauge

Construction
- Structure type: On Ground
- Parking: Available
- Accessible: Disabled access

Other information
- Status: Active
- Station code: NDD
- Zone(s): South Central Railway
- Division(s): Vijayawada

Services
Preceding station	Indian Railways	Following station
Chagallu towards ?	Howrah–Chennai main line	Marampalli towards ?
Kaldhari towards ?	Bhimavaram–Nidadavolu section	Terminus
Location
- Location within Andhra Pradesh Location within India
- Interactive map

Nidadavolu Junction railway station (station code:NDD) located in the Indian state of Andhra Pradesh, serves Nidadavolu in East Godavari district. It is administered under Vijayawada railway division of South Central Railway zone.

== History ==
Between 1893 and 1896, 1,288 km (800 mi) of the East Coast State Railway, between Vijayawada and Cuttack, was opened for traffic. The southern part of the East Coast State Railway (from Waltair to Vijayawada) was taken over by Madras Railway in 1901.

== Classification ==
In terms of earnings and outward passengers handled, Nidadavolu is categorized as a Non-Suburban Grade-4 (NSG-4) railway station. Based on the re–categorization of Indian Railway stations for the period of 2017–18 and 2022–23, an NSG–4 category station earns between ₹10–₹20 crore and handles 2–5 million passengers.

== Station amenities ==
It is one of the 38 stations in the division to be equipped with Automatic Ticket Vending Machines (ATVMs).

Preceding station	Indian Railways	Following station
Brahmanagudem towards ?	South Central Railway zone Visakhapatnam–Vijayawada section of Howrah–Chennai main line	Marampalli towards ?
Kaldhari towards ?	South Central Railway zone Nidadavolu–Bhimavaram–Gudivada–Vijayawada branch line	Terminus
