= Pallantlai =

Pallantla
- Interactive map of Pallantla
- Location in Andhra Pradesh, India
- Coordinates: 16.59°N 81.33°E
- country: India
- State: Andhra Pradesh
- District: East Godavari
- Mandal: Devarapalle

Government
  - Type: Panchayat

Population (2011)
  - Total: 4,233

Languages
  - Official: Telugu
- Time zone: UTC+5:30 (IST)
- PIN: 534313
- Area code: 08813
- ISO 3166 code: IN-WB
- Vehicle registration: [AP37]
- Lok Sabha constituency: Rajahmundry
- Vidhan Sabha constituency: Gopalapuram

Pallantla is a village located in Deverapllai mandal in East Godavari district in the state of Andhra Pradesh, India. It is located in Devarapalle mandal in Kovvur revenue division.

== Demographics ==
As of 2011 Census of India, Pallantali had a population of 4706. The total population constitute, 2386 males and 2320 females with a sex ratio of 972 females per 1000 males. 488 children are in the age group of 0–6 years, with sex ratio of 984. The average literacy rate stands at 70.32%.

== About Pallantla ==
Famous for red chilis, cashew nuts and mango cultivation. Different types of soils help farmers cultivate various crops.

Pallantla village was 5 km radius to Devarapalli Town to connect to Highway. Nearest Airport will be Rajhamundry and next Vijayawada. Nidadavolu and Kovvur and Rajhamundry will be nearest Railway station.

== Urbanization ==
Sub-station that supplies power to the village. Water Supply. Transport Facility.
