= Velivennu =

- Village
- Interactive map of Velivennu
- Location in Andhra Pradesh, India Velivennu (India)
- Coordinates: 16.50341°N 81.41162°E
- Country: India
- State: Andhra Pradesh
- District: East Godavari
- Mandal: Undrajavaram mandal

Government
  - Type: Gramapanchayath

Area
  - Total: 5.55 km^{2} (2.14 sq mi)
- Elevation: 21 m (69 ft)

Population (2011)
  - Total: 12,018
  - Density: 2,170/km^{2} (5,610/sq mi)

Languages
  - Official: Telugu
- Time zone: UTC+05:30 (IST)
- Postal code: 534 355

Velivennu is a second largest village in Undrajavaram mandal, East Godavari district of the Indian state of Andhra Pradesh. It is located in between Tanuku and Nidadavole at a equidistant distance of 12 km and 82 km from Eluru. It is under of Kovvur revenue division.

The present village sarpanch is Sri Mandavalli Subbarao.

Velivennu is well-known as the founding place of Sasi Educational Society which was founded by Shri Burugupalli Venu Gopala Krishna in 1980.

== Demographics ==
As of 2011 Census of India, Velivennu has population of 12,018 of which 6,599 are males while 5,419 are females. Average Sex Ratio of Velivennu village is 821. Population of children with age 0-6 is 764 which makes up 6.36% of total population of village. Literacy rate of Velivennu village was 84.05% with 9,459 literates.
