= Bandaru Satyananda Rao =

Indian politician

Bandaru Sathyananda Rao

Member of Andhra Pradesh Legislative Assembly
- In office 1994–2004
- Preceded by: Chirla Somasundar Reddy
- Succeeded by: Chirla Jaggi Reddy
- Constituency: Kothapeta
- In office 2009–2014
- Constituency: Kothapeta
- Incumbent
- Assumed office 2024

Personal details
- Born: Vadapalem
- Party: Telugu Desam Party
- Occupation: Politician

Bandaru Satyananda Rao is an Indian politician from East Godavari in Andhra Pradesh. He is a Senior leader of Telugu Desam Party.

== Political career ==
Bandaru Sathyananda Rao is a four time MLA from Kothapeta Constituency. He won 1994, 1999, 2009 and 2024 elections.He was first elected as the Member of the Legislative Assembly from the Kothapeta Assembly constituency in 1994 elections. In 2008, He joined in Praja Rajyam Party in the presence of Chiranjeevi. In 2009 elections, he was elected a 3rd time MLA from Praja Rajyam Party. Later in 2014, he again joined in Telugu Desam party. In the recent 2024 Andhra Pradesh Legislative Assembly elections, He secured a massive victory with a record breaking margin of 56479 votes defeating Chirla Jaggireddy of the YSR Congress Party.

== Electoral performance ==
2004 Andhra Pradesh Legislative Assembly election: Kothapeta
Party	Candidate	Votes	%	±%
INC	Chirla Jaggireddy	54,264	51.07	+25.06
TDP	Bandaru Satyananda Rao	51,000	48.93	+7.10
Majority		2,271	2.14	
Turnout		106,259	79.63	+5.62
INC gain from TDP		Swing		

2009 Andhra Pradesh Legislative Assembly election: Kothapeta
Party	Candidate	Votes	%	±%
PRP	Bandaru Satyananda Rao	62,453	37.13	
INC	Chirla Jaggireddy	59,983	35.66	−15.41
TDP	Reddy Subramanyam	37,250	22.15	−26.78
Majority		2,470	1.47	
Turnout		168,196	80.53	+0.90
PRP gain from INC		Swing		

2014 Andhra Pradesh Legislative Assembly election: Kothapeta
Party	Candidate	Votes	%	±%
YSRCP	Chirla Jaggireddy	88,357	46.99	
TDP	Bandaru Satyananda Rao	87,644	46.61	+24.46
Majority		713	0.38	
Turnout		188,051	84.24	+3.71
YSRCP gain from TDP		Swing		

2019 Andhra Pradesh Legislative Assembly election: Kothapeta
Party	Candidate	Votes	%	±%
YSRCP	Chirla Jaggireddy	82,645	40.52%	−6.47
TDP	Bandaru Satyananda Rao	78,607	38.54%	−8.07
JSP	Bandaru Srinivas Rao	35,833	17.57%	N.A
Majority		4,038	1.98%	
Turnout				
YSRCP hold		Swing		

2024 Andhra Pradesh Legislative Assembly election: Kothapeta
Party	Candidate	Votes	%	±%
TDP	Bandaru Satyananda Rao	134,286	61.70%	
YSRCP	Chirla Jaggi Reddy	77,807	35.75%	
INC	Eswara Rao Routhu	1,169	0.54%	
None of the Above	Nota	1575	0.72%	
Majority		56,479	26%	
Turnout		217,629		
TDP gain from YSRCP		Swing	+56479	
