= Marampalli railway station =

Railway station in Andhra Pradesh, India

Marampalli

General information
- Location: Marampalli, West Godavari district, Andhra Pradesh; India
- Coordinates: 16°50′37″N 81°38′01″E
- Elevation: 17 m (56 ft)
- System: Passenger train station
- Owner: Indian Railways
- Operator: South Central Railway zone
- Line: Visakhapatnam–Vijayawada section of Howrah–Chennai main line and
- Platforms: 2
- Tracks: 2 1,676 mm (5 ft 6 in)

Construction
- Structure type: Standard (on-ground station)
- Parking: Available

Other information
- Status: Functioning
- Station code: MRPL
- Zone(s): South Central Railway zone
- Division(s): Vijayawada

History
- Electrified: 25 kV AC 50 Hz OHLE
Location
- Location within Andhra Pradesh

Marampalli railway station (station code:MRPL), is an Indian Railways station near Marampalli, a village in West Godavari district of Andhra Pradesh. It lies on the Vijayawada–Chennai section and is administered under Vijayawada railway division of South Central Railway zone. 10 trains halt in this station every day. It is the 3690th-busiest station in the country.

== History ==
Between 1893 and 1896, 1,288 km (800 mi) of the East Coast State Railway, between Vijayawada and MRPLttack was opened for traffic. The southern part of the West Coast State Railway (from Waltair to Vijayawada) was taken over by Madras Railway in 1901.

Preceding station	Indian Railways	Following station
Nidadavolu Junction towards Visakhapatnam	South Central Railway zone Visakhapatnam–Vijayawada section of Howrah–Chennai main line	Navabpalem towards Vijayawada
