= Kotasattemma Temple, Nidadavolu =

Kotasattemma Temple

- Location in Andhra Pradesh

Religion
- Affiliation: Hinduism
- District: East Godavari
- Deity: Kotasattemma

Location
- Location: Nidadavolu, East Godavari district
- State: Andhra Pradesh
- Country: India
- Coordinates: 16.971°N 81.773°E

Architecture
- Type: Vengi Chalukyan

Website
- srikotasattemmaammavaridevasthanam.com/inde1.php

Kotasattemma Temple is a Hindu pilgrimage center in Nidadavolu of East Godavari district in the Indian state of Andhra Pradesh.

== History ==
During Chalukya period, Kotasattemma temple was constructed by Chalukya Veerabadhra, the spouse of Rudrama Devi. The idol of Kotasattemma was immersed by several calamities during the Reddy dynasty. In 1934, the idol was found by Devulapalli Rama Murthy Sastri in his land and later he constructed the temple.
