= Pasivedala railway station =

Railway station in Andhra Pradesh

Pasivedala
- Pasivedala railway station

General information
- Location: Pasivedala, East Godavari district, Andhra Pradesh; India
- Coordinates: 16°59′37″N 81°42′05″E
- Elevation: 22 m (72 ft)
- System: Passenger train station
- Owner: Indian Railways
- Operator: South Central Railway zone
- Line: Visakhapatnam–Vijayawada section of Howrah–Chennai main line and
- Platforms: 2
- Tracks: 3 1,676 mm (5 ft 6 in)

Construction
- Structure type: Standard (on-ground station)
- Parking: Available

Other information
- Status: Functioning
- Station code: PSDA
- Zone(s): South Central Railway zone
- Division(s): Vijayawada

History
- Electrified: 25 kV AC 50 Hz OHLE
Location
- Location within Andhra Pradesh

Pasivedala railway station (station code:PSDA), is an Indian Railways station in Pasivedala, a village in East Godavari district of Andhra Pradesh. It lies on the Vijayawada–Chennai section and is administered under Vijayawada railway division of South Central Railway zone. 18 trains halt in this station every day. It is the 2607th-busiest station in the country.

== History ==
Between 1893 and 1896, 1,288 km (800 mi) of the East Coast State Railway, between Vijayawada and Cuttack was opened for traffic. The southern part of the West Coast State Railway (from Waltair to Vijayawada) was taken over by Madras Railway in 1901.

PASIVEDALA railway station is connected to many villages like Chagallu Sugar factory, Meenanagaram, Pangidi, Vemuluru, Nandamuru, Mallavaram, Chandravaram etc.,

PASIVEDALA station was halt at present for normal and general passenger trains only. No express trains are now halted here.

Before 1979, some express trains were having hault in this station. Names of those trains were: CIRCAR EXPRESS, CHENNAI-HOWRAH MAIL, JANATHA EXPRESS, PURI TIRUPATI EXPRESS ETC.,

Honourable ALAPATI CHENCHYYA (member of railway board at those times) belonged to this village.

| Preceding station | Indian Railways | Following station |
|---|---|---|
| Kovvur towards ? | South Central Railway zone Visakhapatnam–Vijayawada section of Howrah–Chennai main line | Chagallu towards ? |
