= Kaldhari =

kaldhari
- Village
- Interactive map of kaldhari
- Location in Andhra Pradesh, India kaldhari (India)
- Coordinates: 16.50150°N 81.40399°E
- Country: India
- State: Andhra Pradesh
- District: East Godavari
- Mandal: Undrajavaram

Area
  - Total: 10.7 km^{2} (4.1 sq mi)
- Elevation: 21 m (69 ft)

Population (2011)
  - Total: 5,529
  - Density: 517/km^{2} (1,340/sq mi)

Languages
  - Official: Telugu
- Time zone: UTC+05:30 (IST)
- Postal code: 534 329

Kaldhari is a village in East Godavari of the Indian state of Andhra Pradesh and under Kovvur revenue division. Kaldhari (KLDI) has its own railway station.

== Demographics ==
As of 2011 Census of India, Kaldhari has population of 5,529 of which 2,738 are males while 2,791 are females. Average Sex Ratio of Kaldhari village is 1019. Population of children with age 0-6 is 223 which makes up 10.00% of total population of village. Literacy rate of Kaldhari village was 71.93% with 3,579 literates.
