= Brahmanagudem =

- Village
- Interactive map of Brahmanagudem
- Location in Andhra Pradesh, India Brahmanagudem (India)
- Coordinates: 16°55′39″N 81°40′25″E
- Country: India
- State: Andhra Pradesh
- District: East Godavari

Languages
  - Official: Telugu
- Time zone: UTC+5:30 (IST)
- Vehicle registration: AP

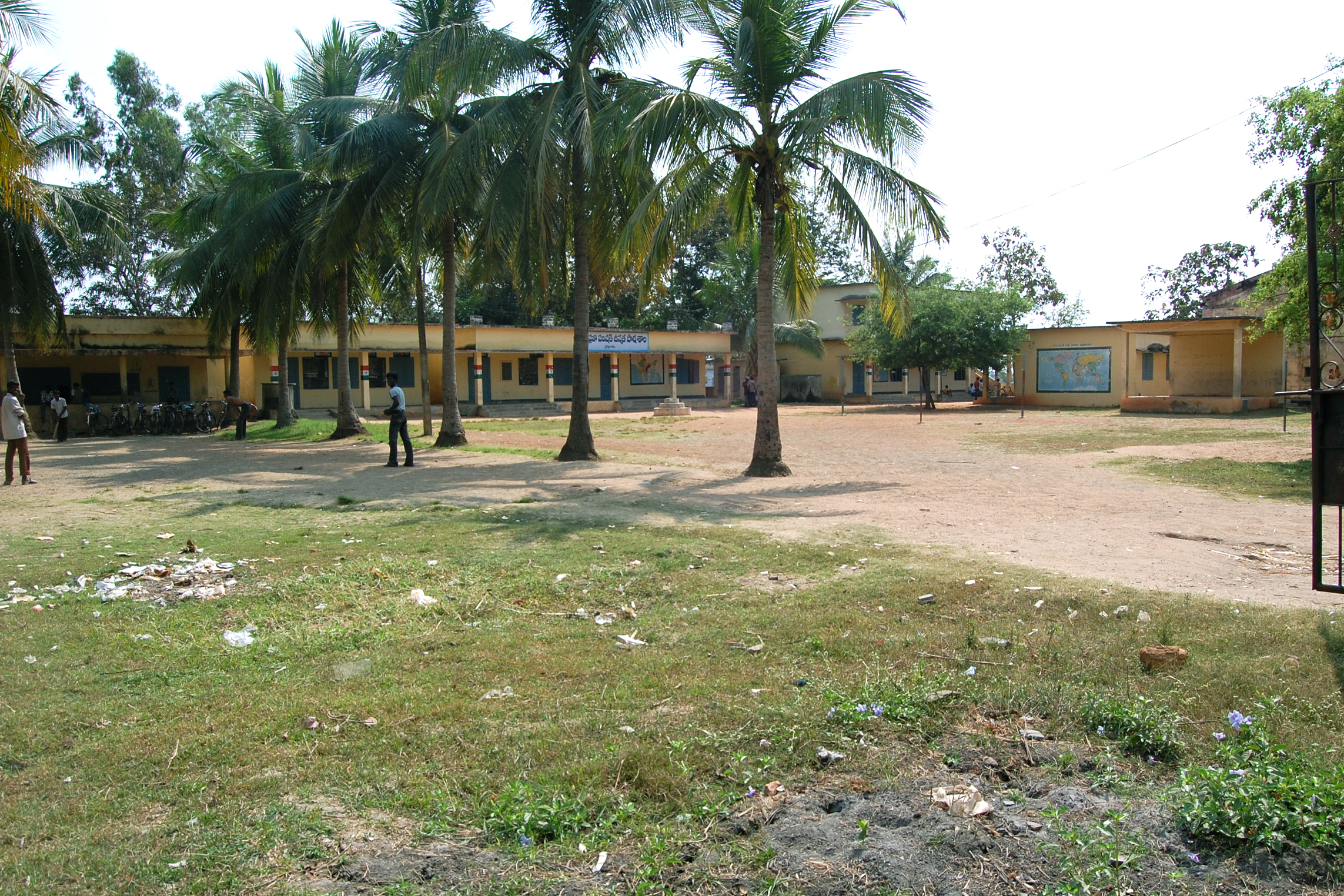
Brahmanagudem Zilla Praja School

Brahmanagudem is a village in East Godavari district of the Indian state of Andhra Pradesh. It is located in Chagallu mandal. Brahmanagudem (BMGM) has its own railway station.

== Demographics ==
As of 2011 Census of India, Brahmanagudem had a population of 5499. The total population constitute, 2742 males and 2757 females with a sex ratio of 1005 females per 1000 males. 536 children are in the age group of 0–6 years, with sex ratio of 881. The average literacy rate stands at 75.78%.
