= Undrajavaram =

- Village
- Interactive map of Undrajavaram
- Location in Andhra Pradesh, India Undrajavaram (India)
- Coordinates: 16.786623°N 81.699722°E
- Country: India
- State: Andhra Pradesh
- District: East Godavari
- Founder: Undraju
- Named for: agriculture; poultry; money lending
- Mandal: Undrajavaram

Government
  - Type: Gram panchayat
  - Body: Undrajavaram Gram panchayat

Population (2011)
  - Total: approx 26,000

Languages
  - telugu Official: Telugu
- Time zone: UTC+5:30 (IST)
- Postal code: 534216
- Vehicle registration: AP 37

Und-raja-varam is a village in East Godavari district of the Indian state of Andhra Pradesh. It lies roughly 3 km North of Tanuku. It comes under the Nidadavolu constituency for assembly elections and Rajamahendravaram constituency for parliamentary elections. The nearest railway station is Tanuku located at a distance of 5 Km. Chennai(570 km) - Kolkata(1100 km) National Highway runs East -west 3 km south of the village. There are almost 5 temples in the village in which venkateswara swamy temple and subramanya swamy temple are notable. Gannamani Venkata Subrahmanyam is the TDP leader from Nidadavole constituency is from Undrajavaram.
