= Gopalapuram mandal =

- Mandal
- Interactive map of Gopalapuram mandal
- Location in Andhra Pradesh, India
- Coordinates: 17.10°N 81.54°E
- Country: India
- State: Andhra Pradesh
- District: East Godavari

Population (2011)
  - Total: 62,597

Languages
  - Official: Telugu
- Time zone: UTC+5:30 (IST)

Gopalapuram mandal is one of the 19 mandals in East Godavari district of the Indian state of Andhra Pradesh. It is administered under Kovvur revenue division and its headquarters are located at Gopalapuram. The mandal is bounded by Polavaram, Koyyalagudem, Devarapalle and Tallapudi mandals.

== Towns and villages ==
As of 2011 census, the mandal has 18 settlements. Gopalapuram is the most populated and Saggonda is the least populated village in the mandal.

The settlements in the mandal are listed below:

1. Bhimolu
2. Cherukumilli
3. Chityala
4. Dondapudi
5. Gangolu
6. Gopalapuram
7. Guddigudem
8. Jagannadhapuram
9. Karagapadu
10. Karicharlagudem
11. Komatigunta
12. Kovvurupadu
13. Nandigudem
14. Saggonda
15. Sagipadu
16. Vadalakunta
17. Vellachintalagudem
18. Venkatayapalem

== See also ==
- East Godavari district
