= Chagallu mandal =

- Mandal
- Interactive map of Chagallu mandal
- Location in Andhra Pradesh, India
- Coordinates: 16.99°N 81.66°E
- Country: India
- State: Andhra Pradesh
- District: East Godavari

Population (2011)
  - Total: 64,774

Languages
  - Official: Telugu
- Time zone: UTC+5:30 (IST)

Chagallu mandal is one of the 19 mandals in East Godavari district of the Indian state of Andhra Pradesh. It is administered under Kovvur revenue division and its headquarters are located at Chagallu. The mandal is bounded by Kovvur, Nidadavole and Devarapalle mandals.

== Towns and villages ==
As of 2011 census, the mandal has 12 settlements. Chagallu is the most populated and Nandigampadu is the least populated village in the mandal.

The settlements in the mandal are listed below:

1. Brahmanagudem
2. Chagallu
3. Unagatla
4. Chikkala
5. Daravaram
6. Kalavalapalle
7. Mallavaram
8. Markondapadu
9. Nandigampadu
10. Nelaturu
11. Singanamuppavaram
12. Chandravaram
