= Chagallu, East Godavari district =

Chagallu
- Village
- Chagallu railway station signboard
- Interactive map of Chagallu
- Location in Andhra Pradesh, India Chagallu (India)
- Coordinates: 16°59′26″N 81°40′04″E
- Country: India
- State: Andhra Pradesh
- District: East Godavari
- Talukas: Chagallu
- Elevation: 13 m (43 ft)

Population (2011)
  - Total: 21,703

Languages
  - Official: Telugu
- Time zone: UTC+5:30 (IST)
- PIN: 534342
- Telephone code: 08813
- Vehicle registration: AP

Chagallu is a village in East Godavari district of the Indian state of Andhra Pradesh. It is located in Chagallu mandal in Kovvur revenue division.

== Demographics ==
As of 2011 Census of India, Chagallu had a population of 21703. The total population constitute, 10843 males and 10860 females with a sex ratio of 1002 females per 1000 males. 2210 children are in the age group of 0–6 years, with sex ratio of 937. The average literacy rate stands at 73.62%.

== Railways ==
Chagallu railway station in the South Coast Railway zone is located near Chagallu around 7 km away.
