= Kothapeta Assembly constituency =

Constituency of the Andhra Pradesh Legislative Assembly, India

Coordinates: 16.72°N 81.89°E

Kothapeta
- Constituency No. 47 for the Andhra Pradesh Legislative Assembly
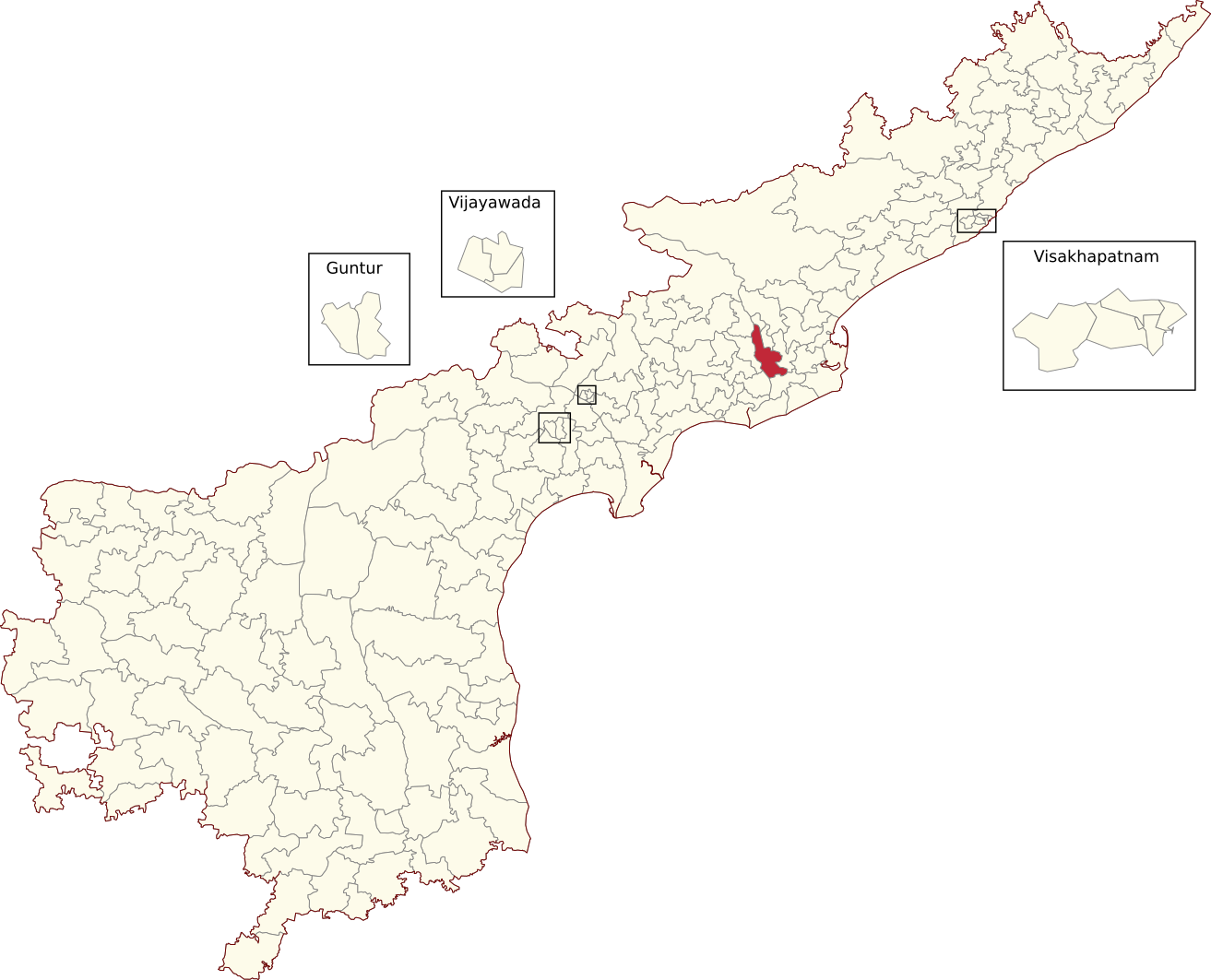
- Location of Kothapeta Assembly constituency within Andhra Pradesh

Constituency details
- Country: India
- Region: South India
- State: Andhra Pradesh
- District: Konaseema
- Lok Sabha constituency: Amalapuram
- Established: 1955
- Total electors: 241,555
- Reservation: None

Member of Legislative Assembly
- 16th Andhra Pradesh Legislative Assembly
- Incumbent Bandaru Satyananda Rao
- Party: TDP
- Alliance: NDA
- Elected year: 2024

Kothapeta Assembly constituency is a constituency in Konaseema district of Andhra Pradesh that elects representatives to the Andhra Pradesh Legislative Assembly in India. It is one of the seven assembly segments of Amalapuram Lok Sabha constituency.

Bandaru Satyananda Rao is the current MLA of the constituency, having won the 2024 Andhra Pradesh Legislative Assembly election from Telugu Desam Party. As of 2019, there are a total of 241,555 electors in the constituency. The constituency was established in 1955, as per the Delimitation Orders (1955).

== Mandals ==
The four mandals that form the assembly constituency are:

Mandal
Ravulapalem
Kothapeta
Atreyapuram
Alamuru

== Members of the Legislative Assembly ==
Year	Member	Political party
1955	Kala Venkata Rao	Indian National Congress
1959 by-election	Manthena Venkata Surya Subha Raju	Indian National Congress
1962	Manthena Venkata Surya Subha Raju	Indian National Congress
1967	Manthena Venkata Surya Subha Raju	Indian National Congress
1972	Denduluri Bhanutilakam	Indian National Congress
1978	Manthena Venkata Surya Subha Raju	Janata Party
1983	Chirla Somasundara Reddy	Telugu Desam Party
1985	I. S. Raju	Telugu Desam Party
1989	Chirla Somasundara Reddy	Indian National Congress
1994	Bandaru Satyananda Rao	Telugu Desam Party
1999	Bandaru Satyananda Rao	Telugu Desam Party
2004	Chirla Jaggireddy	Indian National Congress
2009	Bandaru Satyananda Rao	Praja Rajyam Party
2014	Chirla Jaggireddy	YSR Congress Party
2019	Chirla Jaggireddy	YSR Congress Party
2024	Bandaru Satyananda Rao	Telugu Desam Party

== Election results ==
=== 1955 ===
1955 Andhra State Legislative Assembly election: Kothapeta
Party	Candidate	Votes	%	±%
INC	Kala Venkata Rao	25,373	59.99	
CPI	Mullapudi Suryanarayana	14,634	34.60	
Independent	Turaga Purushottam	2,285	5.40	
Majority		10,739	25.39	
Turnout		42,292	75.80	
INC win (new seat)				

=== 1962 ===
1962 Andhra Pradesh Legislative Assembly election: Kothapeta
Party	Candidate	Votes	%	±%
INC	M. V. S. Subba Raju	26,897		
Independent	M. Subbarayudu	25,364		
Majority		1,533		
Turnout		52,261		
INC hold		Swing		

=== 1967 ===
1967 Andhra Pradesh Legislative Assembly election: Kothapeta
Party	Candidate	Votes	%	±%
INC	Manthena Raju	28,902	51.89	▲0.43
Independent	S. Murtyarea	25,759	46.24	
ABJS	V.R. Bhamidipati	1,042	1.87	
Majority		3,143	5.65	▲2.72
Turnout		55,703	83.50	
INC hold		Swing		

=== 1972 ===
1972 Andhra Pradesh Legislative Assembly election: Kothapeta
Party	Candidate	Votes	%	±%
INC	Denduluri Bhanutilakam	36,813	57.31	▲5.42
Independent	V. Mantena	26,968	41.98	−▼4.26
RPI(K)	Jagannadha Rao Badda	459	0.71	−
Majority		9,845	15.33	▲9.68
Turnout		64,240	79.79	▼3.71
INC hold		Swing		

=== 1978 ===
1978 Andhra Pradesh Legislative Assembly election: Kothapeta
Party	Candidate	Votes	%	±%
JP	Manthena Raju	31,679	43%	
INC	Chirla Reddy	28,110	38.2%	▼19.11
INC(I)	Saka Satyam	12,601	17.1%	▼19.3
Independent	Chandra Rao Merla	865	1.2%	
Independent	Saripella Sita Ramaraju	378	0.5%	
Majority		3,569	4.8%	▼10.53
Turnout		74,725	84.1	▲4.31
JP gain from INC		Swing		

=== 1983 ===
1983 Andhra Pradesh Legislative Assembly election: Kothapeta
Party	Candidate	Votes	%	±%
TDP	Chirla Somasundara Reddy	39,887	54.2%	▲16
INC	Kosuri Raju	19,185	26.1%	▲9
Independent	Bandaru Murthy	13,769	18.7%	
BJP	Mattaparthi Setty	488	0.7%	
Independent	Addanki Satyanarayana	207	0.3%	
Majority		20,702	27.8%	▲23
Turnout		74,417	79.2	▼4.9
TDP gain from JP		Swing		

=== 1985 ===
1985 Andhra Pradesh Legislative Assembly election: Kothapeta
Party	Candidate	Votes	%	±%
TDP	I. S. Raju	30,563	39	▼15.2
Independent	Chirla Reddy	29,166	37.2%	▼17
INC	Kosuri Raju	17,936	22.9%	▼3.22
Independent	Bandaru Rao	260	0.3%	
Independent	K. Menakshi	176	0.2%	
Independent	Seshavatharam Saladi	157	0.2%	
Independent	MushiChollangi Suryanarayana	150	0.2%	
Majority		1,397	1.8%	▼26
Turnout		79,270	79.1	▼0.1
TDP hold		Swing		

=== 1989 ===
1989 Andhra Pradesh Legislative Assembly election: Kothapeta
Party	Candidate	Votes	%	±%
INC	Chirla Reddy	53,431	56.5	▲19.3
TDP	Bandaru Satyananda Rao	41,076	43.5	▲4.5
Majority		12,355	12.7	▲10.9
Turnout		96,907	79	▼0.1
INC gain from TDP		Swing		

=== 1994 ===
1994 Andhra Pradesh Legislative Assembly election: Kothapeta
Party	Candidate	Votes	%	±%
TDP	Bandaru Satyananda Rao	55,117	56.4%	▲12.9
INC	Chirla Reddy	39,576	40.5%	▼16
BSP	Bokka Verriyya	2,540	2.6%	
BJP	Satyavolu Srinivas	587	0.6%	
Majority		15,541	15.7%	▲3
Turnout		99,006	78.8	▼0.2
TDP gain from INC		Swing		

=== 1999 ===
1999 Andhra Pradesh Legislative Assembly election: Kothapeta
Party	Candidate	Votes	%	±%
TDP	Bandaru Satyananda Rao	42,620	41.8%	▼14.6
Independent	Chirla Reddy	26,507	26.0%	▼14.5
INC	Swaminaidu Saladi	21,574	21.2%	▼19.3
Ajeya Bharat Party	Srinuvasu Pithani	353	0.4%	
NTRTDP(LP)	Mushini Durga Ganesh	129	0.1%	
Majority		16,113	15.4%	▼0.3
Turnout		104,905	76.2	▼2.6
TDP hold		Swing		

=== 2004 ===
2004 Andhra Pradesh Legislative Assembly election: Kothapeta
Party	Candidate	Votes	%	±%
INC	Chirla Jaggireddy	54,264	51.07	+25.06
TDP	Bandaru Satyananda Rao	51,000	48.93	+7.10
Majority		2,271	2.14	
Turnout		106,259	79.63	+5.62
INC gain from TDP		Swing		

=== 2009 ===
2009 Andhra Pradesh Legislative Assembly election: Kothapeta
Party	Candidate	Votes	%	±%
PRP	Bandaru Satyananda Rao	62,453	37.13	
INC	Chirla Jaggireddy	59,983	35.66	−15.41
TDP	Reddy Subramanyam	37,250	22.15	−26.78
Majority		2,470	1.47	
Turnout		168,196	80.53	+0.90
PRP gain from INC		Swing		

=== 2014 ===
2014 Andhra Pradesh Legislative Assembly election: Kothapeta
Party	Candidate	Votes	%	±%
YSRCP	Chirla Jaggireddy	88,357	46.99	
TDP	Bandaru Satyananda Rao	87,644	46.61	+24.46
Majority		713	0.38	
Turnout		188,051	84.24	+3.71
YSRCP gain from TDP		Swing		

=== 2019 ===
2019 Andhra Pradesh Legislative Assembly election: Kothapeta
Party	Candidate	Votes	%	±%
YSRCP	Chirla Jaggireddy	82,645	40.52%	−6.47
TDP	Bandaru Satyananda Rao	78,607	38.54%	−8.07
JSP	Bandaru Srinivas Rao	35,833	17.57%	N.A
Majority		4,038	1.98%	
Turnout				
YSRCP hold		Swing		

=== 2024 ===
2024 Andhra Pradesh Legislative Assembly election: Kothapeta
Party	Candidate	Votes	%	±%
TDP	Bandaru Satyananda Rao	134,286	61.70%	
YSRCP	Chirla Jaggi Reddy	77,807	35.75%	
INC	Eswara Rao Routhu	1,169	0.54%	
None of the Above	Nota	1575	0.72%	
Majority		56,479	26%	
Turnout		217,629		
TDP gain from YSRCP		Swing	+56479	

== See also ==
- List of constituencies of the Andhra Pradesh Legislative Assembly
