= Chagallu, Palnadu district =

Chagallu
- Village
- Interactive map of Chagallu
- Location in Andhra Pradesh, India
- Coordinates: 16.3727°N 80.0345°E
- Country: India
- State: Andhra Pradesh
- District: Palnadu
- Mandal: Nekarikallu

Government
  - Type: Panchayati raj
  - Body: Chagallu gram panchayat

Area
  - Total: 2,234 ha (5,520 acres)

Population (2011)
  - Total: 6,648
  - Density: 297.6/km^{2} (770.7/sq mi)

Languages
  - Official: Telugu
- Time zone: UTC+5:30 (IST)
- PIN: 522603
- Area code: +91–8647
- Vehicle registration: AP

Chagallu is a village in Palnadu district of the Indian state of Andhra Pradesh. It is located in Nekarikallu mandal of Sattenapalle revenue division.

== Demographics ==
As of 2011 Census of India, the town had a population of 6,648. The total population constitute, 1,066 males and 1,236 females —a sex ratio of 1,156 females per 1000 males, higher than the national average of 995 per 1000. 705 children are in the age group of 0–6 years, of which 361 are boys and 344 are girls—a ratio of 953 per 1000. The average literacy rate stands at 56.86% with 3,379 literates, significantly lower than the national average of 73.00%.

== Governance ==
Chagallu gram panchayat is the local self-government of the village. It is divided into wards and each ward is represented by a ward member.

== Education ==
As per the school information report for the academic year 2018–19, the village has a total of 5 Zilla Parishad/MPP schools.
