= Yernagudem =

- Village
- Interactive map of Yernagudem
- Location in Andhra Pradesh, India Yernagudem (India)
- Coordinates: 16°59′56″N 81°30′22″E
- Country: India
- State: Andhra Pradesh
- District: East Godavari

Languages
  - Official: Telugu
- Time zone: UTC+5:30 (IST)
- Postal code: 534313

Yernagudem is a village located in the Devarapalle mandal, East Godavari district. It is a junction of 4 roads to cities Eluru, and Rajahmundry and towns Nidadavole, Jangareddygudem. Because of this, it's a popular village for commuting passengers. Yernagudem was once served as taluka.

It was the place where emerging writer and singer Andey Sai keerthana was born. Her mother's maiden name is Potula which is well known in the whole village.
