= Devarapalle mandal =

Coordinates: 17.03°N 81.56°E

Devarapalli దేవరపల్లి
- Town and Mandal
- Interactive map of Devarapalli
- Location in Andhra Pradesh, India
- Country: India
- State: Andhra Pradesh
- Region: Coastal Andhra
- District: East Godavari

Area
  - Total: 218 km^{2} (84 sq mi)

Population (2024)
  - Total: 79,345
  - Density: 364.4/km^{2} (944/sq mi)

Languages
  - Official: Telugu
- Time zone: UTC+5:30 (IST)
- PIN: 534313
- Vehicle registration: AP 39

Devarapalli mandal is one of the 19 mandals in the East Godavari district of the Indian state of Andhra Pradesh. It is administered under the Kovvur revenue division.

== Geography ==
Devarapalli mandal spans an area of 218 km² with a population of 79,345 as of 2024. The population density is 364.4 inhabitants per square kilometer. The mandal is part of the Coastal Andhra region and falls under the administration of the East Godavari district.

== Demographics ==
As of the 2024 update, Devarapalli mandal has a population of 79,345 people. The literacy rate stands at 60.63%, with 62.39% literacy among males and 58.87% among females.

== Villages in Devarapalli Mandal ==
SL.No	Village Name	Plain Population	SC Population	ST Population
1	Bandapuram	1,905	1,547	759
2	Chinnaigudem	4,417	3,240	52
3	Devarapalli	11,206	1,965	205
4	Dhumantunigudem	1,565	1,170	0
5	Duddukuru	3,488	3,154	29
6	Gowripatnam	4,982	2,261	119
7	Krishnampalem	1,762	3	36
8	Kurukuru	975	600	15
9	Lakshmipuram	903	1,253	34
10	Pallanta	2,272	2,353	81
11	Ramanapalam	696	724	0
12	Sangayagudem	1,375	739	16
13	Tyajampudi	3,936	1,431	42
14	Yadavolu	6,647	1,773	39
15	Yernagudem	4,454	3,814	78
Total	Devarapalli Mandal	50,583	26,027	1,505

== Administrative Division ==
Devarapalli mandal is part of the Gopalapuram Assembly Constituency and the Rajahmundry Lok Sabha Constituency. The headquarters of the mandal is located in the town of Devarapalli.

== Economy and Infrastructure ==
Devarapalli mandal is primarily agrarian, with agriculture being the main source of livelihood for the majority of the population. The mandal is well-connected by road and has access to basic amenities and services.
