= Nidadavolu mandal =

Coordinates: 16.911°N 81.662°E

- Mandal
- Interactive Map Outlining mandal
- Location in Andhra Pradesh, India
- Country: India
- State: Andhra Pradesh
- District: East Godavari
- Seat: Nidadavolu

Languages
  - Official: Telugu
- Time zone: UTC+5:30 (IST)

Nidadavolu mandal is one of the 19 mandals in the East Godavari district of the Indian state of Andhra Pradesh. It is administered under the Kovvur revenue division.
