= Kurukuru =

- Interactive map of Kurukuru
- Location in Andhra Pradesh, India Kurukuru (India)
- Coordinates: 16.98°N 81.54°E
- country: India
- State: Andhra Pradesh
- District: East Godavari
- Mandal: Devarapalle

Government
  - Type: Panchayat

Population (2011)
  - Total: 1,590

Languages
  - Official: Telugu
- Time zone: UTC+5:30 (IST)
- PIN: 534305
- Area code: 08813
- ISO 3166 code: IN-WB
- Vehicle registration: [AP37]
- Nearest city: Eluru
- Lok Sabha constituency: Rajahmundry
- Vidhan Sabha constituency: Gopalapuram
- Climate: hot (Köppen)

Kurukuru is a village located in Devarapalle, West Godavari district in the state of Andhra Pradesh, India. Nidadavole and Rajamundry railway station are the nearest railway stations.

== Etymology ==
In ancient times this village was named as "Kotthuru" (Kotthavuru people pronounce as kotthuru), later on renamed as Kurukuru.

== Urbanisation ==
When coming to

== Demographics ==
As of 2011 Census of India, Kurukuru had a population of 1590. The total population constitutes 794 males and 797 females with a sex ratio of 1003 females per 1000 males. 162 children are in the age group of 0–6 years, with sex ratio of 862. The average literacy rate stands at 69.33%.

== Temples ==
Few things about the village there are 7 temples most people are devotional

1. Sri Subrahmanya Swami Temple
2. Hanuman Temple
3. Vinayaka Swami Temple
4. Somalamma Temple
5. Polayramma Temple
6. Ramalayam Temple
7. Sri Venkateswara Swami (Balaji) Temple
