= Kovvur revenue division =

Coordinates: 17.017°N 81.731°E

- revenue division in East Godavari district
- Interactive map of Kovvur revenue division
- Country: India
- State: Andhra Pradesh
- District: East Godavari

Kovvur revenue division (or Kovvur division) is an administrative division in the East Godavari district of the Indian state of Andhra Pradesh. Development started in 2009 after Burugupalli Sesharao was elected as the Member of Legislative Assembly under the Telugu Desam Party (TDP). He was elected twice due to the developments made under his leadership. It is one of the two revenue divisions in the district, which consists of nine mandals under its administration. Kovvur is the divisional headquarters of the division.

== Administration ==
The mandals in the division are:

No.	Mandals
1	Kovvur mandal
2	Chagallu mandal
3	Tallapudi mandal
4	Nidadavole mandal
5	Undrajavaram mandal
6	Peravali mandal
7	Devarapalle mandal
8	Gopalapuram mandal
9	Nallajerla mandal

Municipalities	Kovvur, Nidadavolu, Tanuku

== See also ==
- List of revenue divisions in Andhra Pradesh
- List of mandals in Andhra Pradesh
