= Nidadavolu =

Nidadavolu Niravadyapuram
- Town
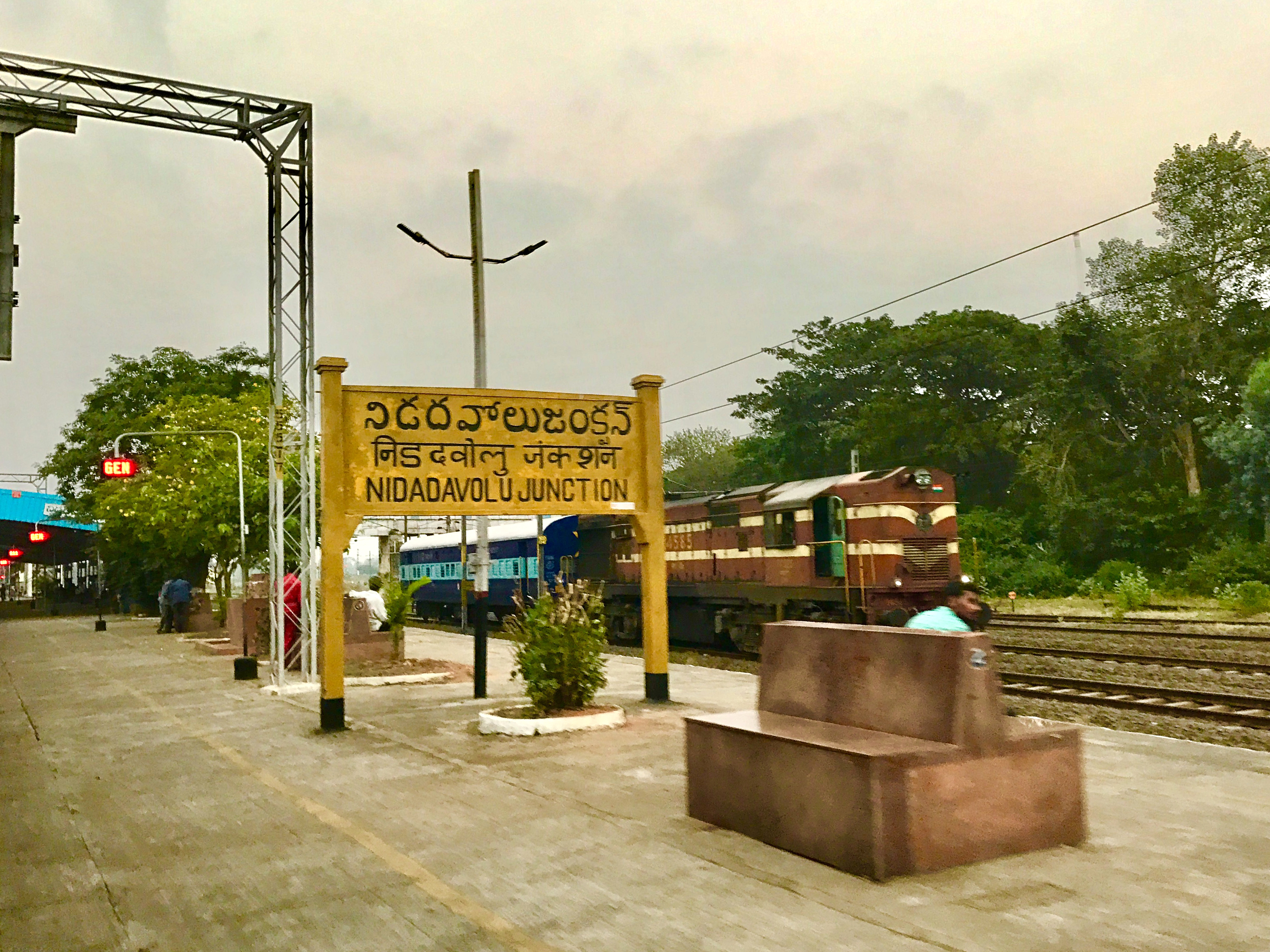
- Nidadavolu Junction Board
- Nickname: Jaladurgam
- Location in Andhra Pradesh, India
- Coordinates: 16.92°N 81.67°E
- Country: India
- State: Andhra Pradesh
- District: East Godavari

Government
  - Type: Municipal chairman & MLA
  - Body: State legislative assemblies of India
  - MLA: Kandula Durgesh

Area
  - Total: 20.36 km^{2} (7.86 sq mi)
- Elevation: 12 m (39 ft)

Population (2011)
  - Total: 43,809
  - Density: 2,152/km^{2} (5,573/sq mi)

Languages
  - Official: Telugu
- Time zone: UTC+5:30 (IST)
- PIN: 534301
- Telephone code: 918813
- Vehicle registration: AP-39

Nidadavolu is a town in East Godavari district of the Indian state of Andhra Pradesh. It is a Newly declared special grade municipality and the mandal headquarters of Nidadavolu mandal in Kovvur revenue division.

== History ==
The town was known as Niravadyaprolu or Niravadyapuram.

Nidadavolu was a fort surrounded by water bodies (Jaladurgam) constructed by Eastern Chalukyan kings. Chalukya Bhima, the builder of Draksharama Bhimeswara temple won this land from Rastrakutas, the then ruling dynasty. A prince of Nidadavolu, Veerabhadra Chalukya, married Rani Rudrama Devi, a prominent ruler and the warrior queen of the Kakatiya dynasty. He fought several wars along with his wife and is hailed as a brave prince. It had 108 Siva temples. A Nandi statue belonging to the 13th century placed in Sri Golingeswara temple was discovered recently.

The town was renamed to Nidadavolu following the annexation of the Northern Circars from the Nizam of Hyderabad, and remained that way since then. Many modern structures have popped up on the outskirts of the town, with the historic center near the Police Precinct.

== Geography ==
Nidadavolu is a mandal, assembly constituency and a main railway junction in East Godavari district of Andhra Pradesh, India. Borders consist of East Godavari district to the east, Devarapalli Mandal to the west, Tadepalligudem mandal and Peravali mandal to the south and Chagallu Mandal to the north.

== Climate ==
Nidadavolu town falls in the hot humid region of the country. The climate of the city is hot in the summers and it is pleasant during the winter. The hottest day falls in the month of May with shift to June during some years.

Climate data for Nidadavolu (1981–2010, extremes 1956–2001)
Month	Jan	Feb	Mar	Apr	May	Jun	Jul	Aug	Sep	Oct	Nov	Dec	Year
Record high °C (°F)	35.0 (95.0)	36.9 (98.4)	38.0 (100.4)	42.8 (109.0)	48.9 (120.0)	46.8 (116.2)	40.4 (104.7)	36.5 (97.7)	37.0 (98.6)	36.5 (97.7)	36.5 (97.7)	35.0 (95.0)	48.9 (120.0)
Mean daily maximum °C (°F)	29.3 (84.7)	30.7 (87.3)	33.3 (91.9)	35.7 (96.3)	37.7 (99.9)	35.4 (95.7)	32.2 (90.0)	31.5 (88.7)	32.2 (90.0)	31.8 (89.2)	30.8 (87.4)	29.2 (84.6)	32.5 (90.5)
Mean daily minimum °C (°F)	18.5 (65.3)	20.1 (68.2)	21.9 (71.4)	24.4 (75.9)	26.2 (79.2)	26.2 (79.2)	25.1 (77.2)	24.7 (76.5)	24.6 (76.3)	23.3 (73.9)	21.0 (69.8)	19.0 (66.2)	22.9 (73.2)
Record low °C (°F)	12.0 (53.6)	11.4 (52.5)	15.4 (59.7)	19.0 (66.2)	18.3 (64.9)	16.4 (61.5)	19.4 (66.9)	14.9 (58.8)	15.9 (60.6)	15.9 (60.6)	13.8 (56.8)	12.3 (54.1)	11.4 (52.5)
Average rainfall mm (inches)	7.1 (0.28)	8.7 (0.34)	15.4 (0.61)	16.0 (0.63)	60.2 (2.37)	131.2 (5.17)	219.1 (8.63)	231.4 (9.11)	168.7 (6.64)	180.5 (7.11)	53.2 (2.09)	8.9 (0.35)	1,100.3 (43.32)
Average rainy days	0.6	0.5	0.8	0.8	2.4	7.0	12.2	11.4	8.9	8.8	2.8	0.5	56.6
Average relative humidity (%) (at 17:30 IST)	67	66	63	58	58	63	75	78	80	77	69	65	68
Source: India Meteorological Department

== Economy ==
Agriculture is the major occupation with many paddy and sugarcane fields. Many crops and vegetables grow in these region and water resource for irrigation is abundant from the major canals of Godavari.

== Culture ==
Kotasattemma Temple is the major Hindu temple in the town.

Temples at the bank of river Godavari are the most attractive tourist area. This spot is also called Chinna Kaasi. The town has Hindu, Muslim and Christian population. There are also five mosques, Christian churches, and many small roadside Hindu temples.

== Transport ==
The town has a total road length of 98.21 km (61.02 mi). Srikakulam-chennai highway passes through the town. Nidadavolu Junction is one of the important railway junction for the town and East Godavari. It is the junction of Bhimavaram–Nidadavolu section and Vijayawada–Nidadavolu sections of Howrah–Chennai main line. The station is getting major restoration after the doubling of Bhimavaram-Nidadavolu section, New platforms 4 and 5 will be built soon. The station is administered under Vijayawada railway division of South Central Railway zone.

The town has an APSRTC bus depot which serves in routes Tadepalligudem, Rajahmundry, Eluru, Vijayawada, Polavaram, Jangareddygudem, Narsapuram, Bhimavaram, Kakinada, Hyderabad, Visakhapatnam, Aakiveedu, Devarapalli, Madhavaram.

The nearest airport to the town is Rajahmundry Airport located at a distance of 39 kilometres, currently serving as a domestic airport.

From the town center, there are 5 major routes that enter it. AP Highway 22 heads south from Chagallu and crosses into Nidadavolu, entering Samisragudem in the east, continuing to D. Muppavaram. AP Highway 194 from Yernagudem ends at the center. Highway 210 comes from Tadepalligudem and ends at the Nidadavole Police Precinct, and Highway 204 appears as a route to Vijjeswaram and nearby Madduru, an exit from Samisragudem.

== Education ==
The primary and secondary school education is imparted by government, aided and private schools, under the School Education Department of the state. The medium of instruction followed by different schools are English, Telugu.

A lot of private schools/colleges are being established in and around the town.

== See also ==
- List of municipalities in Andhra Pradesh
