= Transport in Eluru =

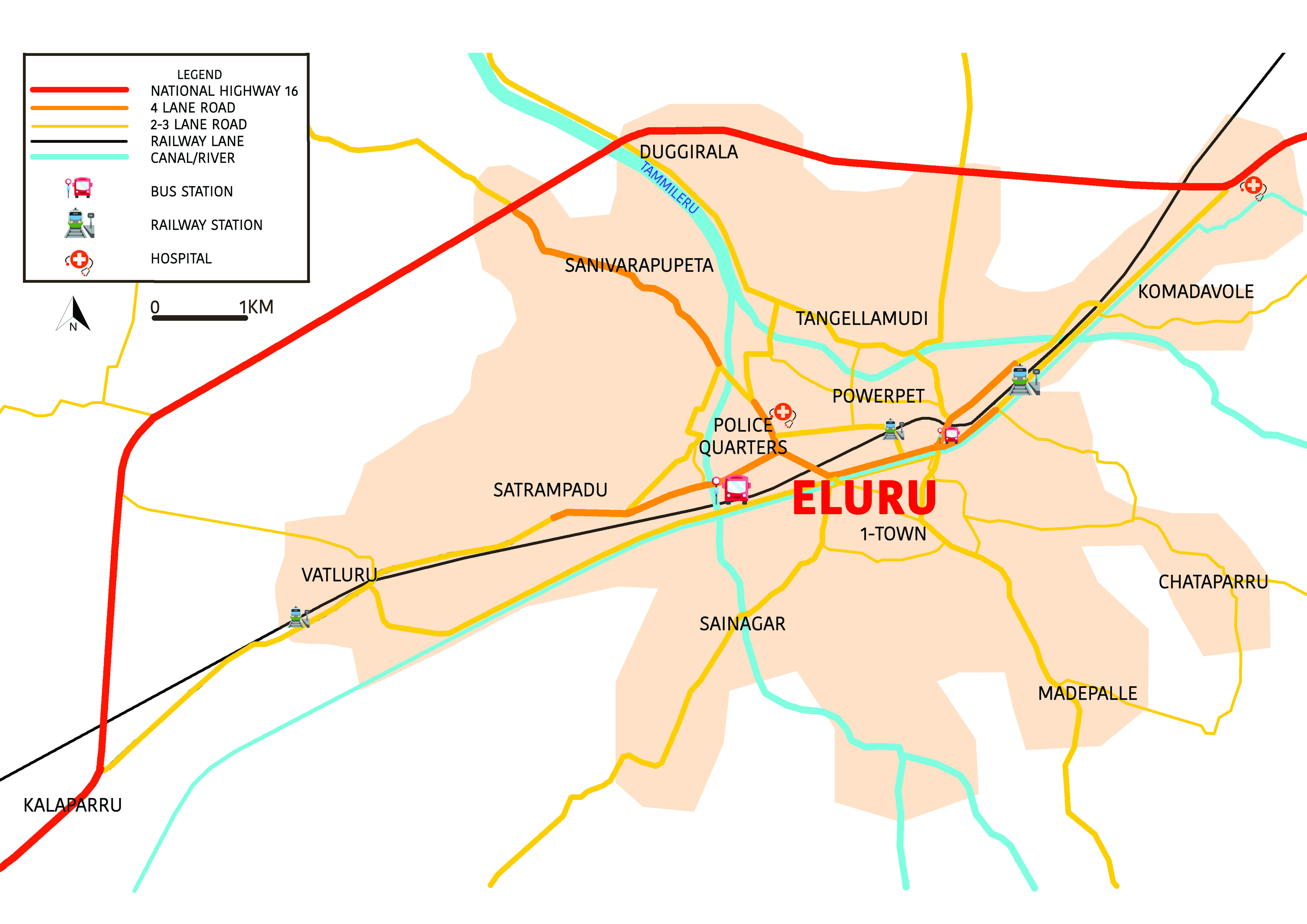
Transport map of Eluru

There are various modes of transportation available in Eluru, a city in the Indian state of Andhra Pradesh, and its region. It includes auto rickshaws, bicycles to mass transit systems – such as buses and trains. The city was once famed for its traffic problems with the railway gates at Vatluru, Venkatraopet, Powerpet, Old bus stand and Eastern Locks areas. When the National Highway passed through the city, the traffic hurried to pass over the railway gates in the city and outskirts, which makes traffic worse.

To avoid the traffic congestion, the government of India constructed a mini bypass road connecting Eastern locks and Vatluru on both ends of the city. Even then, the traffic problem was not resolved. The main bypass road (which was constructed under Golden Quadrilateral programme which was completed in the late 1990s) had only 10,000 vehicles pass through the bypass road; now it has almost doubled.

Traffic in the city of narrow lanes was growing by the day. Even though officials constructed an underbridge at Venkatraopet railway gate and a railway overbridge at old bus stand besides the foot bridge at Powerpet was replaced by another bridge, but the traffic has doubled, without giving any relief to citizens. There are 93 traffic centres identified in the city.

== Roadways ==
The city has a total road length of 227.09 km (141.11 mi). The traffic uses bypass National Highway 16, GNT road and mini-bypass roads. The expansion of mini-bypass road 10-kilometre (6.2 mi) into 4-Lanes is under planning, which once completed, would connect nearby suburbs. There are a couple of highways that pass through the city connecting Eluru to major cities in India. The GNT Road is a 15-kilometre (9.3 mi), six-lane road and Bypass road (NH-16) 20-kilometre (12 mi) serves major portion of traffic in Eluru, whereas Bypass road is going to be made into 10-lane (6+4) which makes traffic ease between Eluru and Vijayawada.

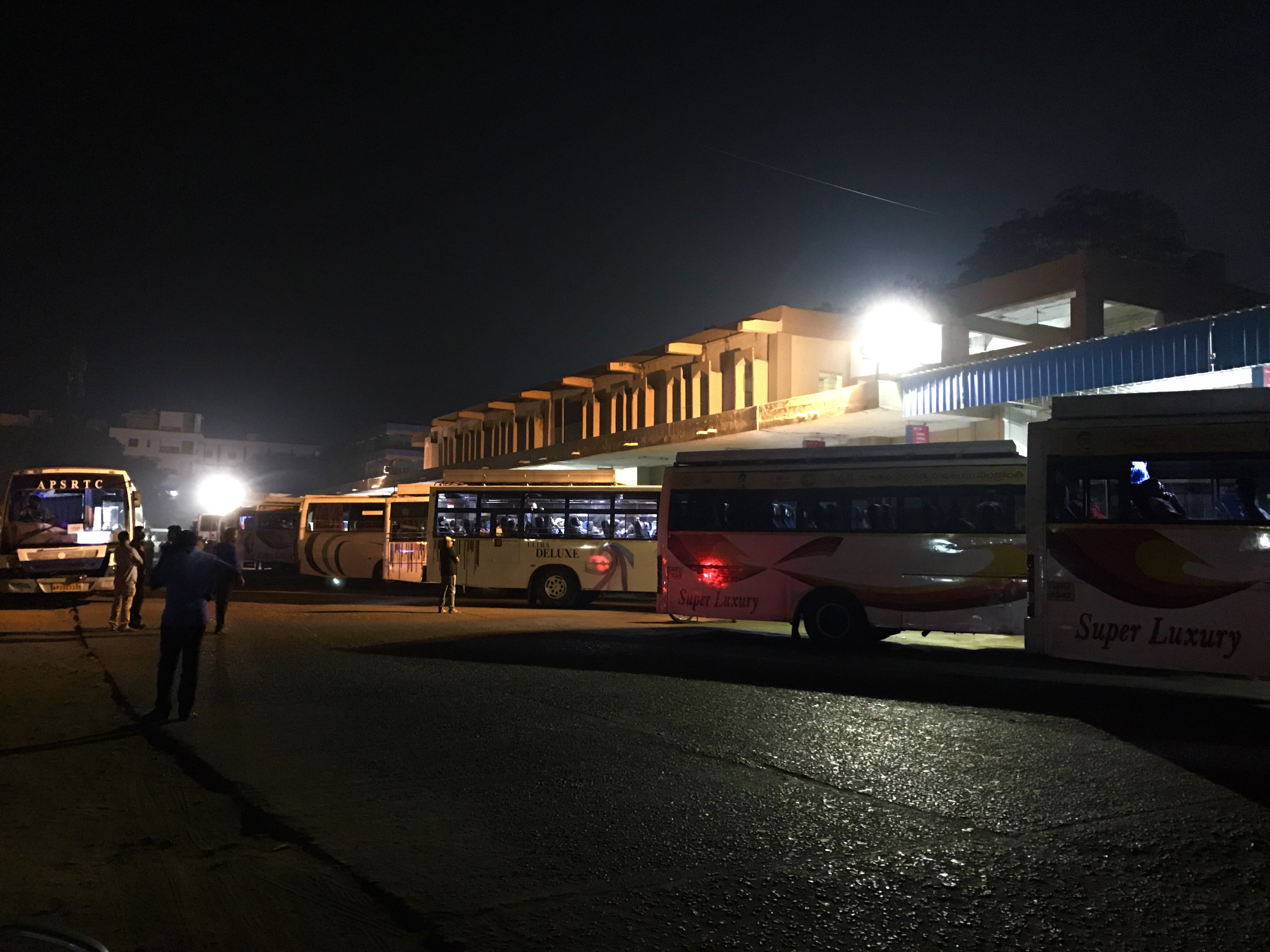
Departure Block of Eluru New Bus station

Sanivarapupeta road, Ramachandra Rao Pet main road, Powerpet Station road, Court Centre Road, Rama Mahal Centre Road, ASR Stadium road, Kannaya Park Road, Kotadibba Road are some of the arterial roads of the city.

== Public transport ==
Powerpet railway station Board

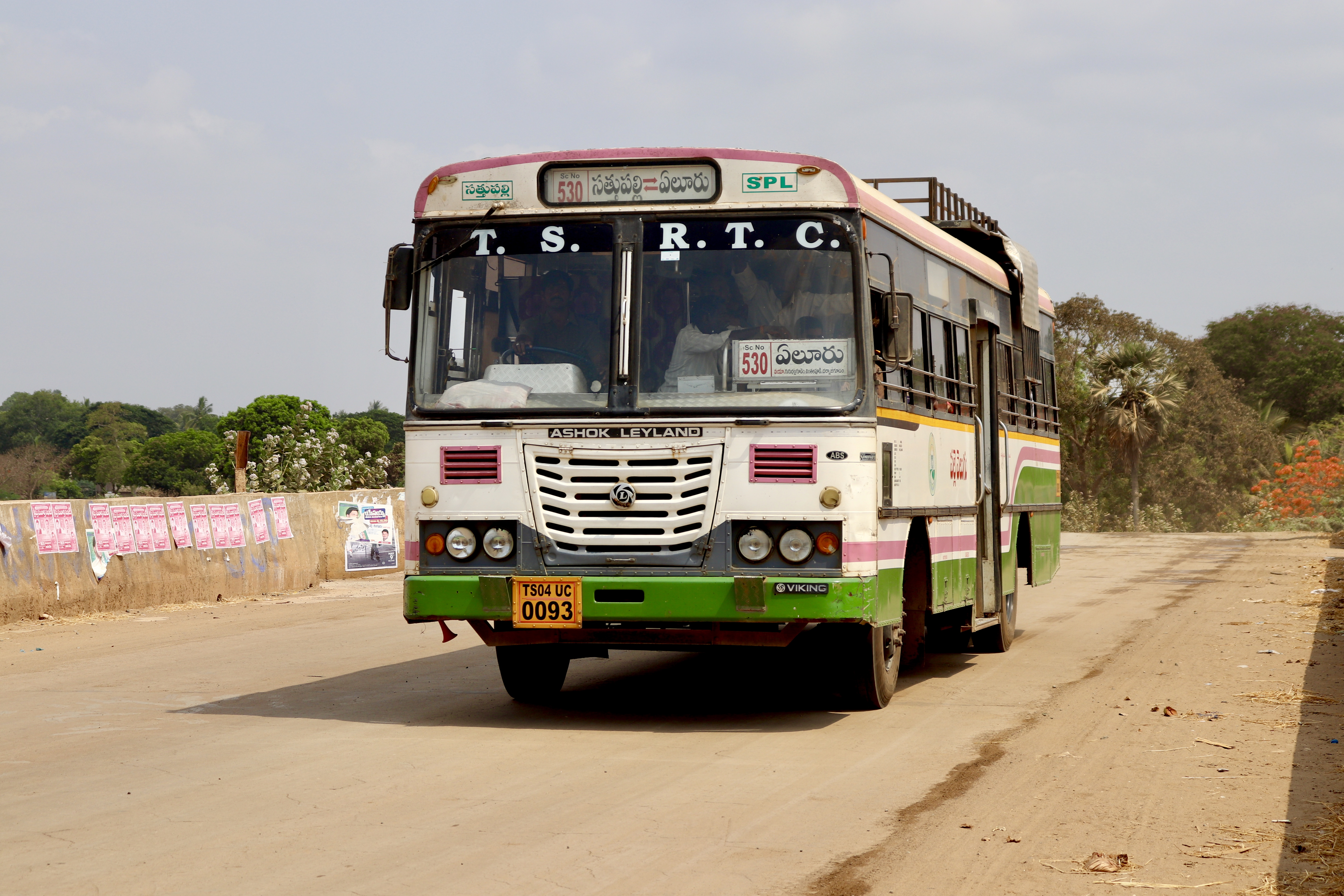
An APSRTC bus near Eluru

Auto rickshaws are also one of the important modes of public transport in the city. The main bus terminus is located in the south-western part of the city. Eluru is the regional headquarters of the state run bus services, APSRTC. It operates buses from Eluru Old and Eluru New bus stations. The services include, Palle Velugu for rural areas, CNG buses for long-distance services. Train Transit is another common mode of transport for long-distance travel. Eluru railway station is the main railway station in South Central Railway zone. Government is planning to run more suburban trains between Vijayawada–Eluru–Rajahmundry, apart from Vijayawada – Kakinada passenger and Vijayawada – Rajahmundry MEMU. Powerpet, Vatluru, Sitampet, Denduluru, Bhimadole railway stations are the other railway stations in the city.

Indian National Waterway 4 (NW-4) is under development. The (NW-4) (NW-4) runs along the Coromandal Coast through Kakinada, Eluru, Commanur, Buckingham Canal, and part of the Krishna and Godavari rivers in South India.
