= Eluru (disambiguation) =

Eluru is a city in Andhra Pradesh, India. Eluru may also refer to

== Places ==
- Eluru (rural), a partial outgrowth of Eluru
- Eluru (Assembly constituency)
- Eluru (Lok Sabha constituency)
- Eluru Road, Vijayawada in Andhra Pradesh

== See also ==
- Eluru Urban Development Authority
- Eluru railway station
- Eluru New bus station in Eluru
- Eluru Old bus station
- Eluru Municipal Corporation
- Eluru Buddha Park in Eluru
- Eluru mandal in Andhra Pradesh
- Eluru revenue division
