= Pedapadu =

Coordinates: 16°38′27″N 81°01′56″E

- village
- Interactive map of Pedapadu
- Country: India
- State: Andhra Pradesh
- District: Eluru

Languages
  - Official: Telugu
- Time zone: UTC+5:30 (IST)
- Vehicle registration: AP 37
- Website: http://pedapadu.com/

Pedapadu is a village located in the Eluru district (formerly part of West Godavari district) in the Indian state of Andhra Pradesh. It is located in Pedapadu mandal and serves as the headquarters of Pedapadu mandal, one of the administrative divisions in the Eluru revenue division. Pedapadu is primarily an agrarian settlement with historical significance, moderate literacy levels, and a notable contribution to regional political history.

== Geography ==
Pedapadu is situated in the central part of Eluru district of Andhra Pradesh. The village is approximately 12 kilometers southwest of Eluru city, which is the district headquarters. Pedapadu geographically belongs to the fertile Krishna-Godavari delta region, which consists of rich black cotton and alluvial soils, conducive to agriculture.

The village's geographical coordinates place it at a height of about 21 meters (69 feet) above sea level. The topography is primarily flat, with expansive fields and a network of irrigation canals resulting from nearby river systems and reservoirs. These irrigation systems are critical for sustaining year-round agricultural activity, especially during droughts.

Pedapadu has a tropical wet and dry climate with hot summers, a monsoon period from June to September, and cool winters. The average annual rainfall in Pedapadu, which is situated within West Godavari district, is approximately 1,000 millimeters, receiving about 68–70% of this precipitation during the southwest monsoon, with the remainder in the northeast monsoon season. Because Pedapadu is part of this broader West Godavari delta region, these figures are considered representative and reliable for estimating its annual rainfall.

== Demographics ==
According to the 2011 Census of India, Pedapadu is divided into two administrative divisions known as Pedapadu I and Pedapadu II, which both represent the village's socio-demographic core.

=== Pedapadu I ===
- Population: 7,754
- Males: 3,778
- Females: 3,976
- Households: 2,160
- Children (0–6 years): 701
- Schedule Castes: 1,820
- Scheduled Tribes':' 265
- Literacy Rate: 73.61%
- Males: 78.79%
- Females: 68.66%
- Total Workers: 4,053

=== Pedapadu II ===
- Population: 4,529
- Males: 2,253
- Females: 2,276
- Households: 1,367
- Children (0–6 years): 426
- Schedule Castes: 1,388
- Scheduled Tribes: 161
- Literacy Rate: 70.51%
- Males: 74.12%
- Females: 66.99%
- Total Workers: 2,789

Since this census was recorded nearly over a decade ago, these metrics could have likely changed due to various factors such as change in birth and death rates as well as migration factors.

Over the course of the century, there has a been a trend of a decline in percentage of the Indian rural population due to such factors. Many rural youth migrate to nearby cities like Eluru, Vijayawada, or even larger metros for education, jobs, or business, which can reduce the village population. Mechanization in agriculture or growth of non-farm employment (construction, small businesses) could change the workforce profile. Villages near towns or highways often see urban sprawl, where they become semi-urbanized due to infrastructure development. Pedapadu's proximity to Eluru implies potential population shifts due to housing and commercial expansion. Beyond population metrics, a trend in increased literacy rates throughout rural Indian villages, such as Pedapadu, is apparent through increased government emphasis on literacy programs, midday meal schemes, and school enrollment drives. These initiatives can especially be impactful among women. These discrepancies reflect broader national and regional patterns in gender-based educational access, especially in the rural areas, where social norms and historical inequalities have served to maintain a historical disparity between male and female literacy rates.

== Administration ==
Pedapadu has a Gram Panchayat administering it, which is the village self-governing system of the Panchayati Raj setup. Pedapadu village is under Pedapadu mandal that consists of a few neighboring villages.

Pedapadu is centered at the upper administrative level in the Eluru parliamentary constituency and is under the Eluru assembly segment. Government departments such as agriculture, revenue, and public health are organized from mandal headquarters in the village.

== Economy ==
No village‑specific economic survey is publicly available for Pedapadu. However, as an agrarian village within the Krishna–Godavari delta of West Godavari district, the local economy closely reflects that of the wider district. The economy of Pedapadu, much like many other villages in the West Godavari District, is predominantly agrarian with the majority of the population engaged in farming or cultivation. The fertile land and irrigation facilities available in the region are conducive to the growth of a variety of crops, including: rice (the most commonly grown crop), sugarcane, bananas, coconut and mango plantations, and various vegetables and legumes. Apart from direct agriculture, the majority of inhabitants work in dairy farming, poultry, and small family businesses. The proximity to the city of Eluru allows for periodic labour migration and the exchange of goods and services typically with surplus produce.

== Transportation and connectivity ==
Pedapadu has easy road connectivity with Eluru and other neighboring townships. Pedapadu and Eluru, as well as other villages of the mandal, are connected by regular buses through the Andhra Pradesh State Road Transport Corporation (APSRTC). The Tanuku, Tanku Bypass, and Peravali are the nearest APSRTC bus stations to Pedapadu. Auto-rickshaws, also known as "Tuk-Tuk", and shared forms of transportation are also available.

The Vatlur Railway Station is the nearest railway station to Pedapadu, which is located within the district of Eluru as it is 8.2 kilometers away from Pedapadu. The station is located near Sir CR Reddy College of Engineering. This station is connected to Eluru, which then connects to Vijaywada and the broader area of Andhra Pradesh and eventually past state borders to India.

The nearest airport is Vijayawada International Airport, located about 28.62 kilometers from Pedapadu, providing regional and national air connectivity.

== Education ==
Pedapadu has a number of government and private schools, offering mainly primary and secondary education. The village schools include:

- Government Zilla Parishad High School (ZPHS)
- Mandal Parishad Primary Schools (MPPS)
- Private English-medium schools

For higher education, students typically travel to Eluru, which hosts colleges, vocational institutes, and a medical college.

The level of literacy in men is higher compared to that of women, a scenario consistent with overall rural trends across India. However, through government intervention as mentioned in the Demographic section previously, there has been a greater initiative in increasing literacy rates among women. Educational outreach campaigns and school attendance incentives, such as free midday meals, scholarships, and provision of school uniforms, have also served to achieve increased enrollment rates, particularly for disadvantaged groups of scheduled castes and tribes.

== Culture and religion ==
The majority of Pedapadu residents practice Hinduism, much like that of the greater Indian population. The village is home to numerous temples serving as spiritual and cultural centers. Common religious practices occur around times of festivals and auspicious times. Such practices include Vinayaka Chavithi (also known as Ganesh Chaturthi), Sankranti, Dasara, Ugadi (Telugu New Year).

The village temples typically host yearly festivals, which include processions, dances, and village feasts (annadanam), often accompanied by traditional music, street plays, and communal rituals that reinforce local traditions and social cohesion. There are small Christian and Muslim minorities in the village, reflective of religious diversity in the greater Andhra Pradesh and South India.

Oral traditions and cultural events remain vibrant, especially during the festivals, and elderly villagers regularly pass on oral histories. This practice of preserving heritage through oral stories is common to all cultures and villages around the globe, where stories form part of the essential means of transmitting values, history, and social identity from one generation to the next. A general purpose of these stories is to retain and strengthen the sense of identity tied to the village.

== Nearby villages ==
As mentioned in the beginning, Pedapadu is a part of an administrative group of villages under the same district. Some of the villages within the mandal and nearby Pedapadu include Vatluru, Mupparru, Edulakunta, Chodimella, Mamidikuduru. These villages share economic, cultural, and political ties. For instance, these villages collaborate through shared panchayat meetings, school zonings, and agricultural collaboration.
