= Chodimella =

- Village
- Location in Andhra Pradesh, India
- Coordinates: 16.737257°N 81.090570°E
- Country: India
- State: Andhra Pradesh
- District: Eluru

Government
  - Body: village

Population (2011)
  - Total: 2,843

Languages
  - Official: Telugu
- Time zone: UTC+5:30 (IST)
- PIN: 534005
- Vehicle registration: AP-37

Chodimella is a village and census town in Eluru district of the Indian state of Andhra Pradesh. It is located in Eluru mandal of Eluru revenue division. The town is a constituent of Eluru urban agglomeration.

== Demographics ==
At the 2011 Census of India, Chodimella had a population of 2,843 (1,444 males and 1,399 females with a sex ratio of 969 females per 1,000 males). 289 children were in the age group of 0–6 years with child sex ratio of 889 girls per 1,000 boys. The average literacy rate was 71.53%

== Transport ==
Chodimella is well connected by road. APSRTC runs bus services from Eluru New bus station and Eluru Old bus station to Chodimella. Eluru railway station is the nearest railway station with Vatluru and Powerpet also nearby.
