= Jalipudi =

- Village
- Interactive map of Jalipudi
- Location in Andhra Pradesh, India
- Coordinates: 16.682717°N 81.139803°E
- Country: India
- State: Andhra Pradesh
- District: Eluru

Government
  - Body: village

Population (2011)
  - Total: 3,818

Languages
  - Official: Telugu
- Time zone: UTC+5:30 (IST)
- PIN: 534004
- Vehicle registration: AP-37

Jalipudi is a village in Eluru district of the Indian state of Andhra Pradesh. It is located in Eluru mandal of Eluru revenue division. The town is a constituent of Eluru urban agglomeration.

== Demographics ==
As of 2011 Census of India, Jalipudi had a population of 3818. The total population constitute, 1880 males and 1938 females with a sex ratio of 1031 females per 1000 males. 400 children are in the age group of 0–6 years with child sex ratio of 1062 girls per 1000 boys. The average literacy rate stands at 73.34 %

== Transport ==
Jalipudi is well connected by road. For this village till date there is no bus facility from APSRTC. Eluru railway station is the nearest railway station and Vatluru, Powerpet being the other.
