= Ipur =

Ipur may refer to:

- Ipur, Guntur district, a village in Guntur district, Andhra Pradesh, India
- Ipurupalem, a village in Prakasam district, Andhra Pradesh, India
- Epuru, West Godavari district, a village in West Godavari district, Andhra Pradesh, India
