= Pydichintapadu =

- Village
- Interactive map of Pydichintapadu
- Location in Andhra Pradesh, India
- Coordinates: 16.6041°N 81.1957°E
- Country: India
- State: Andhra Pradesh
- District: Eluru

Population (2011)
  - Total: 1,874

Languages
  - Official: Telugu
- Time zone: UTC+5:30 (IST)
- PIN: 534004
- Vehicle registration: AP-37

Pydichintapadu is a village in Eluru district of the Indian state of Andhra Pradesh. It is located in Eluru mandal of Eluru revenue division.

== Demographics ==
As of 2011 Census of India, Pydichintapadu had a population of 1874. The total population constitute, 971 males and 90e females with a sex ratio of 930 females per 1000 males. 218 children are in the age group of 0–6 years with child sex ratio of 703 girls per 1000 boys. The average literacy rate stands at 70.95 %.
