= Gudivakalanka =

- Village
- Interactive map of Gudivakalanka
- Location in Andhra Pradesh, India
- Coordinates: 16.6365°N 81.2126°E
- Country: India
- State: Andhra Pradesh
- District: Eluru

Area
  - Total: 18.52 km^{2} (7.15 sq mi)

Population (2011)
  - Total: 5,308
  - Density: 286.6/km^{2} (742.3/sq mi)

Languages
  - Official: Telugu
- Time zone: UTC+5:30 (IST)
- PIN: 534004
- Vehicle registration: AP-37

Gudivakalanka is a village in Eluru district of the Indian state of Andhra Pradesh. It is located in Eluru mandal of Eluru revenue division..The nearest train station is Kaikolur (KKLR) located at a distance of 8.9 km. This village is of Taluk Chataparru, Division Eluru, District West Godavari, Related Sub Office is Chataparru S.O, Related Head Office Eluru H.O. Pincode 534004

== Demographics ==
As of 2011 Census of India, Gudivakalanka had a population of 5308. The total population constitute, 2664 males and 2644 females with a sex ratio of 992 females per 1000 males. 648 children are in the age group of 0–6 years with child sex ratio of 1006 girls per 1000 boys. The average literacy rate stands at 66.55 %.
