= Amrutalingampeta =

- Village
- Interactive map of Amrutalingampeta
- Location in Andhra Pradesh, India Amrutalingampeta (India)
- Coordinates: 16.6196°N 81.0064°E
- Country: India
- State: Andhra Pradesh
- District: Eluru

Government
  - Body: Gram Panchayat

Population (2011)
  - Total: 1,096

Languages
  - Official: Telugu
- Time zone: UTC+5:30 (IST)
- PIN: 534 437

Amrutalingampeta is a village in Eluru district of the Indian state of Andhra Pradesh. It is located in Pedapadu mandal of Eluru revenue division. The nearest railway stations are Vatlur and Nuzvid.

== Demographics ==
At the 2011 Census of India, Amrutalingampeta had a population of 1,096 (535 males and 561 females with a sex ratio of 1049 females per 1000 males). 96 children are in the age group of 0–6 years with sex ratio of 600. The average literacy rate was 73.40%.
