= Manuru =

- Village
- Interactive map of Manuru
- Location in Andhra Pradesh, India
- Coordinates: 16.6163°N 81.1363°E
- Country: India
- State: Andhra Pradesh
- District: Eluru

Population (2011)
  - Total: 927

Languages
  - Official: Telugu
- Time zone: UTC+5:30 (IST)
- PIN: 534004
- Vehicle registration: AP-37

Manuru is a village in the Eluru district of the Indian state of Andhra Pradesh. It is located in the Eluru mandal of the Eluru revenue division.

== Demographics ==
As of 2011 Census of India, Manuru had a population of 927. The total population constitute, 462 males and 465 females with a sex ratio of 1006 females per 1000 males. 116 children are in the age group of 0–6 years with child sex ratio of 871 girls per 1000 boys. The average literacy rate stands at 58.57 %.
