= Malkapuram, Eluru district =

Malkapuram
- Village
- Interactive map of Malkapuram
- Location in Andhra Pradesh, India
- Coordinates: 16°43′26″N 81°08′26″E
- Country: India
- State: Andhra Pradesh
- District: Eluru

Government
  - Body: village

Population (2011)
  - Total: 3,461

Languages
  - Official: Telugu
- Time zone: UTC+5:30 (IST)
- PIN: 534 005
- Vehicle registration: AP 37

Malkapuram is a village in Eluru district of the Indian state of Andhra Pradesh. It is located in Eluru mandal of Eluru revenue division. The town is a constituent of Eluru urban agglomeration.

== Demographics ==
As of 2011 Census of India, Malkapuram had a population of 3461. The total population constitute, 1557 males and 1904 females with a sex ratio of 1223 females per 1000 males. 353 children are in the age group of 0–6 years with child sex ratio of 1089 girls per 1000 boys. The average literacy rate stands at 82.34 %
