= Satyavolu =

- Village
- Interactive map of Satyavolu
- Location in Andhra Pradesh, India Satyavolu (India)
- Coordinates: 16.5956°N 81.0589°E
- Country: India
- State: Andhra Pradesh
- District: Eluru

Government
  - Body: Gram Panchayat

Population (2011)
  - Total: 3,416

Languages
  - Official: Telugu
- Time zone: UTC+5:30 (IST)
- PIN: 534 437

Satyavolu is a village in Eluru district of the Indian state of Andhra Pradesh. It is located in Pedapadu mandal of Eluru revenue division.

== Demographics ==
As of 2011 Census of India, Satyavolu had a population of 3416. The total population constitute, 1737 males and 1679 females with a sex ratio of 967 females per 1000 males. 332 children are in the age group of 0–6 years with sex ratio of 1012. The average literacy rate stands at 69.97%.
