= Eluru (rural) =

- Out growth
- Location in Andhra Pradesh, India
- Coordinates: 16.720620°N 81.108480°E
- Country: India
- State: Andhra Pradesh
- District: Eluru

Government
  - Body: Out growth

Area
  - Total: 29.7 km^{2} (11.5 sq mi)

Population (2011)
  - Total: 22,457
  - Density: 756/km^{2} (1,960/sq mi)

Languages
  - Official: Telugu
- Time zone: UTC+5:30 (IST)
- PIN: 534 004

Eluru Rural is a partial out growth of Eluru in Eluru district of the Indian state of Andhra Pradesh. It is located in Eluru mandal of Eluru revenue division. It is also a constituent of Eluru urban agglomeration.

== Geography ==
It is located on the north side of Kolleru lake.

== Transportation ==
APSRTC runs buses from Eluru and Bhimavaram to this region. Eluru is the nearby railway station.
