= Vempadu, Eluru district =

Vempadu
- Village
- Interactive map of Vempadu
- Location in Andhra Pradesh, India Vempadu (India)
- Coordinates: 16.5323°N 81.4821°E
- Country: India
- State: Andhra Pradesh
- District: Eluru

Government
  - Body: Gram Panchayat

Population (2011)
  - Total: 2,277

Languages
  - Official: Telugu
- Time zone: UTC+5:30 (IST)
- PIN: 534004

Vempadu is a village in Pedapadu mandal, Eluru district of the Indian state of Andhra Pradesh.
