= Eluru mandal =

- Mandal
- Interactive map of Eluru mandal
- Location in Andhra Pradesh, India
- Coordinates: 16.7°N 81.1°E
- Country: India
- State: Andhra Pradesh
- District: Eluru
- Headquarters: Eluru

Population (2011)
  - Total: 319,405

Languages
  - Official: Telugu
- Time zone: UTC+5:30 (IST)

Eluru mandal is one of the 28 mandals in Eluru district of the Indian state of Andhra Pradesh. It is administered under Eluru revenue division and its headquarters are located at Eluru city. The mandal is bounded by Pedapadu mandal, Pedavegi mandal, Denduluru mandal, Bhimadole mandal and it also borders Krishna district.

== Demographics ==
As of 2011 census, the Mandal had a population of 319,405. The total population constitute, 157,783 males and 161,622 females —a sex ratio of 1024 females per 1000 males. 29,992 children are in the age group of 0–6 years, of which 15,295 are boys and 14,697 are girls. The average literacy rate stands at 81.60% with 236,156 literates.

== Towns and villages ==
As of 2011 census, the Mandal has 22 settlements. It includes 1 city, 4 census towns, 2 out growths and 15 villages. Eluru (rural) is the most populated and Manuru is the least populated village in the mandal.

The settlements in the mandal are listed below:

1. Chataparru [R]
2. Chodimella [U]
3. Eluru (M.Corp) [U]
4. Eluru (rural) (part) (OG)
5. Gavaravaram (CT) [U]
6. Gudivakalanka [R]
7. Jalipudi [R]
8. Kalakurru [R]
9. Katlampudi [R]
10. Kokkirailanka [R]
11. Komadavole (part) (OG) [U]
12. Komatilanka [R]
13. Madepalle [R]
14. Malkapuram [R]
15. Manuru [R]
16. Ponangi [U]
17. Prathikollanka [R]
18. Pydichintapadu [R]
19. Sanivarapupeta (CT) [U]
20. Satrampadu (CT) [U]
21. Sreeparru [R]
22. Tangellamudi (CT) [U]

Note: M.Corp-Municipal Corporation, CT-Census town, OG-Out Growth

== See also ==
- Eluru district
