= Rajupeta, Eluru district =

Rajupeta
- Village
- Interactive map of Rajupeta
- Location in Andhra Pradesh, India Rajupeta (India)
- Coordinates: 16.6249°N 81.0271°E
- Country: India
- State: Andhra Pradesh
- District: Eluru

Government
  - Body: Gram Panchayat

Population (2011)
  - Total: 622

Languages
  - Official: Telugu
- Time zone: UTC+5:30 (IST)
- PIN: 534 437

Rajupeta is a village in Eluru district of the Indian state of Andhra Pradesh. It is located in Pedapadu mandal of Eluru revenue division. The nearest train station is Vinnamangalam (VGM) located at a distance of 20.21 km.

== Demographics ==
As of 2011 Census of India, Nandikeswarapuram had a population of 622. The total population constitute, 323 males and 299 females with a sex ratio of 926 females per 1000 males. 58 children are in the age group of 0–6 years with sex ratio of 611. The average literacy rate stands at 72.34%.
