= Nandikeswarapuram =

- Village
- Interactive map of Nandikeswarapuram
- Location in Andhra Pradesh, India Nandikeswarapuram (India)
- Coordinates: 16.6379°N 81.0230°E
- Country: India
- State: Andhra Pradesh
- District: Eluru

Government
  - Body: Gram Panchayat

Population (2011)
  - Total: 212

Languages
  - Official: Telugu
- Time zone: UTC+5:30 (IST)
- PIN: 534 437

Nandikeswarapuram is a village in Eluru district of the Indian state of Andhra Pradesh. It is located in Pedapadu mandal of Eluru revenue division.

== Demographics ==
As of 2011 Census of India, Nandikeswarapuram had a population of 212. The total population constitute, 104 males and 108 females with a sex ratio of 1328 females per 1000 males. 28 children are in the age group of 0–6 years with sex ratio of 1000. The average literacy rate stands at 67.93%.
