= Kokkirailanka =

- Village
- Interactive map of Kokkirailanka
- Location in Andhra Pradesh, India
- Coordinates: 16.6381°N 81.2353°E
- Country: India
- State: Andhra Pradesh
- District: Eluru

Area
  - Total: 6.86 km^{2} (2.65 sq mi)

Population (2011)
  - Total: 505
  - Density: 73.6/km^{2} (191/sq mi)

Languages
  - Official: Telugu
- Time zone: UTC+5:30 (IST)
- PIN: 534004
- Vehicle registration: AP-37

Kokkirailanka is a village in Eluru district of the Indian state of Andhra Pradesh. It is located in Eluru mandal of Eluru revenue division.

== Demographics ==
As of 2011 Census of India, Kokkirailanka had a population of 505. The total population constitute, 247 males and 258 females with a sex ratio of 1045 females per 1000 males. 59 children are in the age group of 0–6 years with child sex ratio of 1185 girls per 1000 boys. The average literacy rate stands at 64.13 %.
