= Sakalakothapalle =

- Village
- Interactive map of Sakalakothapalle
- Location in Andhra Pradesh, India Sakalakothapalle (India)
- Coordinates: 16.5966°N 81.0385°E
- Country: India
- State: Andhra Pradesh
- District: Eluru

Government
  - Body: Gram Panchayat

Population (2011)
  - Total: 772

Languages
  - Official: Telugu
- Time zone: UTC+5:30 (IST)
- PIN: 534 437

Sakalakothapalle is a village in Eluru district of the Indian state of Andhra Pradesh. It is located in Pedapadu mandal of Eluru revenue division.

== Demographics ==
As of 2011 Census of India, Sakalakothapalle had a population of 772. The total population constitute, 402 males and 370 females with a sex ratio of 920 females per 1000 males. 65 children are in the age group of 0–6 years with sex ratio of 970. The average literacy rate stands at 70.30%.
