= Komadavole =

- Out Growth
- Location in Andhra Pradesh, India
- Coordinates: 16.7118°N 81.0735°E
- Country: India
- State: Andhra Pradesh
- District: Eluru

Government
  - Body: Out Growth

Population (2011)
  - Total: 2,052

Languages
  - Official: Telugu
- Time zone: UTC+5:30 (IST)
- PIN: 534 001

Komadavole is an out growth of Eluru city in Eluru district of the Indian state of Andhra Pradesh. It is located in Eluru mandal of Eluru revenue division. It is also a constituent of Eluru Urban Agglomeration.

== Geography ==
It is located on the north side of Kolleru lake.

== Demographics ==
As of 2011 Census of India, the village had a population of 2,052. Of the total population, males constitute 1,033 and females are 1,019 with a sex ratio of 986 females per 220 males. The population under 6 years of age are 260 with sex ratio of 1095. The average literacy rate stands at 69.60 percent.

== Transportation ==
APSRTC runs buses from Eluru and Rajahmundry to this region.
