= Komatilanka =

- village
- Interactive map of Komatilanka
- Location of Komatilanka in Andhra Pradesh, India Komatilanka (India)
- Coordinates: 16.3450°N 81.3411°E
- Country: India
- State: Andhra Pradesh
- District: Eluru
- Mandal: Mandal

Population (2011)
  - Total: 1,123

Languages
  - Official: Telugu
- Time zone: UTC+5:30 (IST)
- PIN: 534 004
- Telephone code: 08812

Komatilanka is a village in Eluru district in the state of Andhra Pradesh in India. The nearest railway station is Kaikolur (KKLR) located at a distance of 4.57 km.

== Demographics ==
As per census 2011 Komatilanka has a population of 1123 of which 582 are males while 541 are females. Average Sex Ratio of Komatilanka village is 930. Child population is 131 which makes up 11.67% of total population of village with sex ratio 899. In 2011, literacy rate of Komatilanka village was 70.26% when compared to 67.02% of Andhra Pradesh. LOCATION = the village komatilanka located in west godavari eluru mandal but it is very nearer to krishna district kaikaluru.

Occupations= The main occupation of the people in the village fishing, some people are doing agricultural labour works.

== See also ==
- Eluru
