= Sreeparru =

- village
- Interactive map of Sreeparru
- Location of Sreeparru in Andhra Pradesh, India Sreeparru (India)
- Coordinates: 16°38′28″N 81°08′21″E
- Country: India
- State: Andhra Pradesh
- District: Eluru
- Mandal: Eluru

Population (2011)
  - Total: 2,534

Languages
  - Official: Telugu
- Time zone: UTC+5:30 (IST)
- PIN: 534 004
- Telephone code: 08812
- Vehicle registration: AP

Sreeparru is a village in Eluru district in the state of Andhra Pradesh in India. It is 22 km from the city of Eluru, the headquarters of Eluru district.

== Demographics ==
As of 2011 Sreeparru has a population of 2534 of which 1274 are males while 1260 are females. Average Sex Ratio of Sreeparru village is 989. Child population is 219 which makes up 8.64% of total population of village with sex ratio 840. In 2011, literacy rate of Sreeparru village was 66.74% when compared to 67.02% of Andhra Pradesh.

== See also ==
- Eluru
