= Pedapadu mandal =

- Mandal
- Interactive Map Outlining mandal
- Location in Andhra Pradesh, India
- Coordinates: 16.60°N 81.02°E
- Country: India
- State: Andhra Pradesh
- District: Eluru

Population (2011)
  - Total: 76,793

Languages
  - Official: Telugu
- Time zone: UTC+5:30 (IST)

Pedapadu mandal is one of the 28 mandals in Eluru district of the Indian state of Andhra Pradesh having population of 76,793 as of 2011 census. It is administered under Eluru revenue division and its headquarters are located at Pedapadu.

== Towns and villages ==
As of 2011 census, the mandal has 23 settlements. Vatluru is the most populated and Edulakunta is the least populated village in the mandal.

The settlements in the mandal are listed below:

1. Amrutalingampeta
2. Burugagudem
3. Edulakunta
4. Epuru
5. Gogunta
6. Gudipadu
7. Kalaparru
8. Kokkirapadu
9. Koniki
10. Kothuru
11. Mupparru
12. Nandikeswarapuram
13. Pedapadu I
14. Pedapadu II
15. Punukollu I
16. Rajupeta
17. Sakalakothapalle
18. Satyavolu
19. Tallagudem
20. Tallamudi
21. Vasantawada-I
22. Vasantawada-II
23. Vatluru
24. Vempadu

== See also ==
- List of mandals in Andhra Pradesh
