= Tallagudem =

- Village
- Interactive map of Tallagudem
- Location in Andhra Pradesh, India Tallagudem (India)
- Coordinates: 16°40′07″N 81°05′05″E
- Country: India
- State: Andhra Pradesh
- District: Eluru

Government
  - Body: Gram Panchayat

Population (2011)
  - Total: 568

Languages
  - Official: Telugu
- Time zone: UTC+5:30 (IST)
- PIN: 534002

Tallagudem is a village in Eluru district of the Indian state of Andhra Pradesh. It is located in Pedapadu mandal of Eluru revenue division.

== Demographics ==
As of 2011 Census of India, Tallagudem had a population of 568. The total population constitute, 285 males and 283 females with a sex ratio of 993 females per 1000 males. 60 children are in the age group of 0–6 years with sex ratio of 1400. The average literacy rate stands at 67.91%.
