= Madepalle =

- Village
- Interactive map of Madepalle
- Location in Andhra Pradesh, India
- Coordinates: 16°41′08″N 81°07′33″E
- Country: India
- State: Andhra Pradesh
- District: Eluru

Government
  - Body: village

Population (2011)
  - Total: 5,132

Languages
  - Official: Telugu
- Time zone: UTC+5:30 (IST)
- PIN: 534004
- Vehicle registration: AP-37

Madepalle is a village in Eluru district of the Indian state of Andhra Pradesh. It is located in Eluru mandal of Eluru revenue division. The town is a constituent of Eluru urban agglomeration.

== Demographics ==
As of 2011 Census of India, Madepalle had a population of 5132. The total population constitute, 2528 males and 2604 females with a sex ratio of 1030 females per 1000 males. 524 children are in the age group of 0–6 years with child sex ratio of 1130 girls per 1000 boys. The average literacy rate stands at 77.04 %
