= Satrampadu =

- Census Town
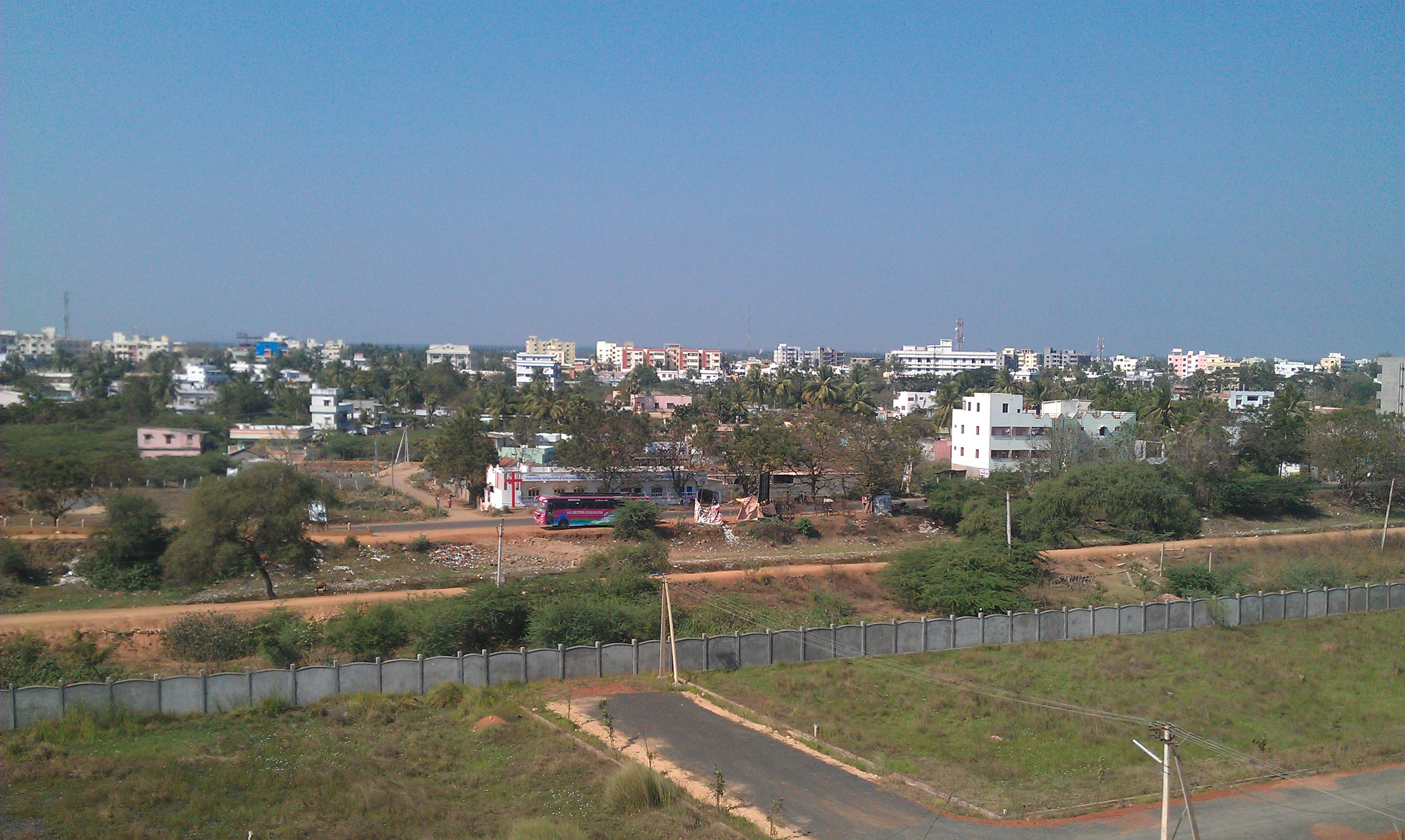
- A view of Satramapdu from Mini-Bypass

- Location in Andhra Pradesh, India
- Coordinates: 16.42174°N 81.04238°E
- Country: India
- State: Andhra Pradesh
- District: Eluru

Area
  - Total: 1.40 km^{2} (0.54 sq mi)

Population (2011)
  - Total: 6,393
  - Density: 4,570/km^{2} (11,800/sq mi)

Languages
  - Official: Telugu
- Time zone: UTC+5:30 (IST)
- PIN: 534 007
- Vehicle registration: AP-37

Satrampadu is a census town in Eluru district of the Indian state of Andhra Pradesh. It is located in Eluru mandal of Eluru revenue division. The town is a constituent of Eluru urban agglomeration.

== Demographics ==
As of 2011 census of India, Satrampadu had a population of 6393. The total population constitute, 3,153 males and 3,240 females —a sex ratio of 1023 females per 1000 males. 533 children are in the age group of 0–6 years with child sex ratio of 1090 girls per 1000 boys. The average literacy rate stands at 88.45% with 5654 literates.

== Education ==
The primary and secondary school education is imparted by government, aided and private schools, under the School Education Department of the state. The medium of instruction followed by different schools are English, Telugu.
