= Kalakurru =

- Village
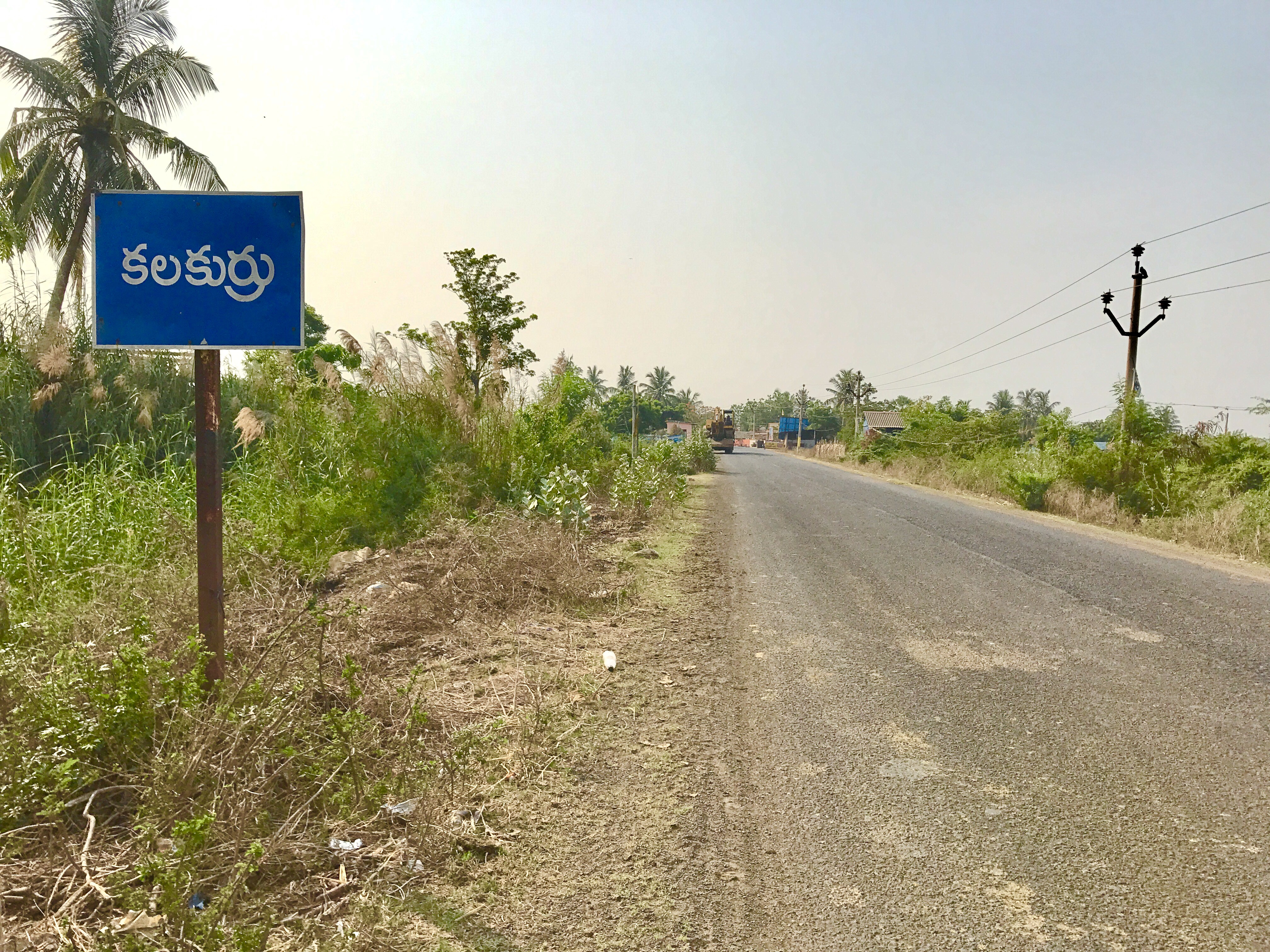
- Kalakurru Village board
- Interactive map of Kalakurru
- Location in Andhra Pradesh, India
- Coordinates: 16.6321°N 81.1610°E
- Country: India
- State: Andhra Pradesh
- District: Eluru

Area
  - Total: 11.72 km^{2} (4.53 sq mi)

Population (2011)
  - Total: 1,445
  - Density: 123.3/km^{2} (319.3/sq mi)

Languages
  - Official: Telugu
- Time zone: UTC+5:30 (IST)
- PIN: 534004
- Vehicle registration: AP-37

Kalakurru is a village in Eluru district of the Indian state of Andhra Pradesh. It is located in Eluru mandal of Eluru revenue division. The nearest train station is located in Eluru.

== Demographics ==
As of 2011 Census of India, Jalipudi had a population of 1445. The total population constitutes 732 males and 713 females with a sex ratio of 974 females per 1000 males. 196 children are in the age group of 0–6 years with child sex ratio of 782 girls per 1000 boys. The average literacy rate stands at 67.49 %.
