= Gogunta =

- Village
- Interactive map of Gogunta
- Location in Andhra Pradesh, India Gogunta (India)
- Coordinates: 16.580°N 81.017°E
- Country: India
- State: Andhra Pradesh
- District: Eluru

Government
  - Body: Gram Panchayat

Population (2011)
  - Total: 708

Languages
  - Official: Telugu
- Time zone: UTC+5:30 (IST)
- PIN: 534 437

Gogunta is a village in Eluru district of the Indian state of Andhra Pradesh. It is located in Pedapadu mandal of Eluru revenue division. Nuzvid railway station is the nearest railway station.

== Demographics ==
As of 2011 Census of India, Gogunta had a population of 708. The total population constitute, 348 males and 360 females with a sex ratio of 1034 females per 1000 males. 62 children are in the age group of 0–6 years with sex ratio of 1214. The average literacy rate stands at 67.80%.
