= Ponangi =

- Village
- Interactive map of Ponangi
- Location in Andhra Pradesh, India
- Coordinates: 16.6634°N 81.1072°E
- Country: India
- State: Andhra Pradesh
- District: Eluru

Population (2011)
  - Total: 3,494

Languages
  - Official: Telugu
- Time zone: UTC+5:30 (IST)
- PIN: 534004
- Vehicle registration: AP-39

Ponangi is a village in Eluru district of the Indian state of Andhra Pradesh. It is located in Eluru mandal of Eluru revenue division. The nearest railway station is located at Eluru.

== Demographics ==
As of 2011 Census of India, Ponangi had a population of 3494. The total population constitute, 1729 males and 1765 females with a sex ratio of 1021 females per 1000 males. 375 children are in the age group of 0–6 years with child sex ratio of 1206 girls per 1000 boys. The average literacy rate stands at 72.14 %.
