= Kalaparru =

- Village
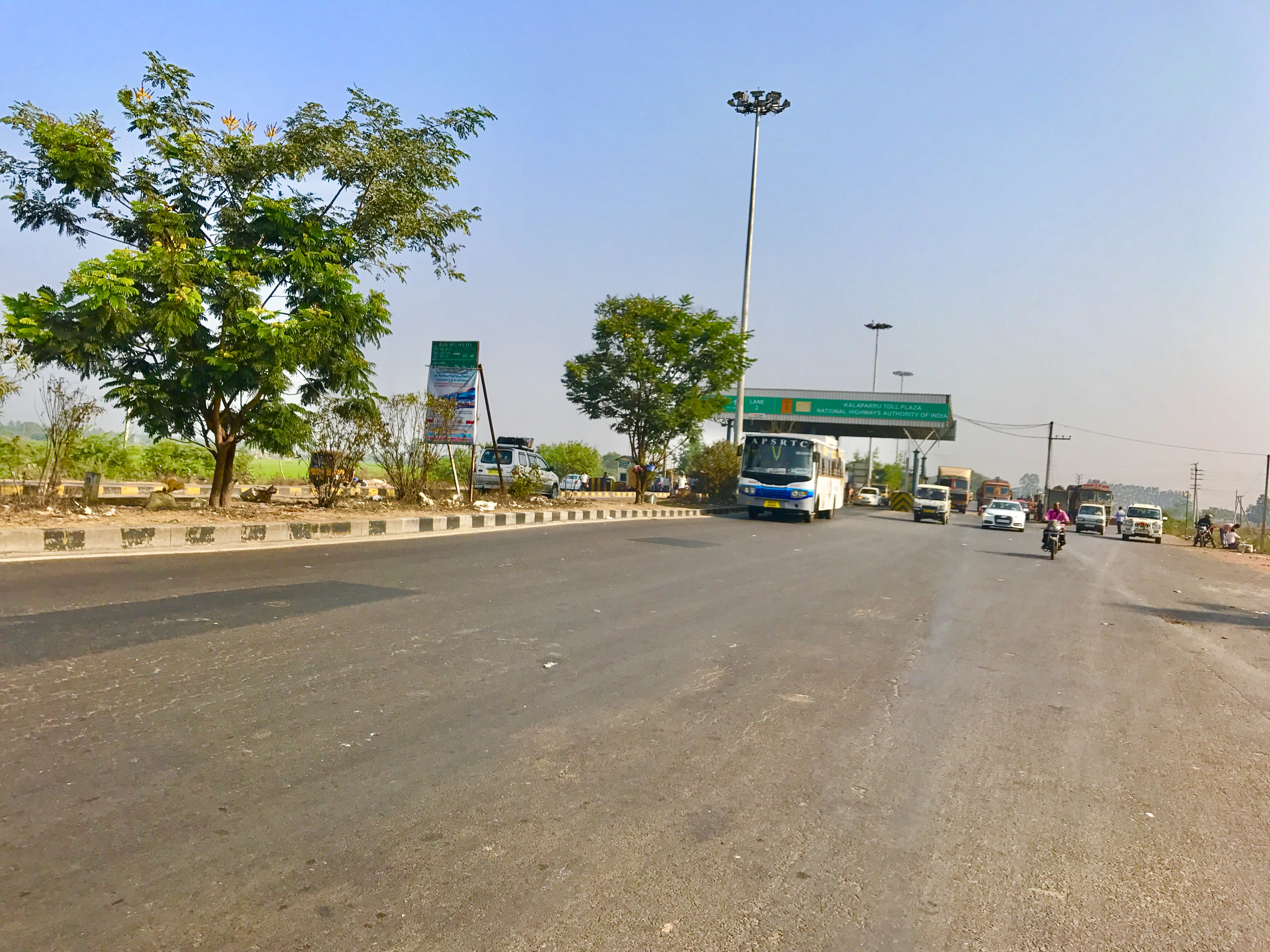
- Kalaparru Toll Plaza on AH-45
- Interactive map of Kalaparru
- Location in Andhra Pradesh, India Kalaparru (India)
- Coordinates: 16.6709°N 81.0105°E
- Country: India
- State: Andhra Pradesh
- District: Eluru
- Mandal: Pedapadu mandal
- Elevation: 22 m (72 ft)

Population (2011)
  - Total: 2,987

Languages
  - Official: Telugu
- Time zone: UTC+05:30 (IST)
- Postal code: 534 007

Kalaparru is a village in Eluru district of the Indian state of Andhra Pradesh. It is located in Pedapadu mandal of Eluru revenue division. It is located at a distance of 10 km from district headquarters Eluru city. The nearest train station is Vatlur railway station located at a distance of 3.89 km.

== Demographics ==
As of 2011 Census of India, Kalaparru had a population of 2987. The total population constitutes 1505 males and 1482 females: a sex ratio of 985 females per 1000 males. 274 children are in the age group of 0–6 years, with a child sex ratio of 1015 girls per 1000 boys. The average literacy rate stands at 77.63%. Kalaparru has two entrances. The main entrance is (west) opposite of NH-5 and another entrance is at the back side of the village.
