= Kothuru, Eluru district =

Kothuru
- Village
- Interactive map of Kothuru
- Location in Andhra Pradesh, India Kothuru (India)
- Coordinates: 16.6836°N 81.0844°E
- Country: India
- State: Andhra Pradesh
- District: Eluru

Government
  - Body: Gram Panchayat

Population (2011)
  - Total: 3,082

Languages
  - Official: Telugu
- Time zone: UTC+5:30 (IST)
- PIN: 534 437

Kothuru is a village in Eluru district of the Indian state of Andhra Pradesh. It is located in Pedapadu mandal of Eluru revenue division.

== Demographics ==
As of 2011 Census of India, Kothuru had a population of 3082. The total population constitutes 1521 males and 1561 females with a sex ratio of 1026 females per 1000 males. 312 children are in the age group of 0–6 years with sex ratio of 1094. The average literacy rate stands at 73.47%.
