= Katlampudi =

- Village
- Interactive map of Katlampudi
- Location in Andhra Pradesh, India
- Coordinates: 16.6547°N 81.1444°E
- Country: India
- State: Andhra Pradesh
- District: Eluru

Government
  - Body: village

Population (2011)
  - Total: 846

Languages
  - Official: Telugu
- Time zone: UTC+5:30 (IST)
- PIN: 534004
- Vehicle registration: AP-37

Katlampudi is a village in Eluru district of the Indian state of Andhra Pradesh. It is located in Eluru mandal of Eluru revenue division.

== Demographics ==
As of 2011 Census of India, Jalipudi had a population of 846. The total population constitute, 413 males and 433 females with a sex ratio of 1048 females per 1000 males. 75 children are in the age group of 0–6 years with child sex ratio of 1500 girls per 1000 boys. The average literacy rate stands at 85.99 %.
