= Tallamudi =

- Village
- Interactive map of Tallamudi
- Location in Andhra Pradesh, India Tallamudi (India)
- Coordinates: 16°38′13″N 80°58′51″E
- Country: India
- State: Andhra Pradesh
- District: Eluru

Government
  - Body: Gram Panchayat

Population (2011)
  - Total: 7,084

Languages
  - Official: Telugu
- Time zone: UTC+5:30 (IST)
- PIN: 534437

Tallamudi is a village in Eluru district of the Indian state of Andhra Pradesh. It is located in Pedapadu mandal.

== Demographics ==
As of 2011 Census of India, Vatluru had a population of 14,368. The total population constitute, 3305 males and 3775 females —a sex ratio of 1143 females per 1000 males. 1,077 children are in the age group of 0–6 years with sex ratio of 944. The average literacy rate stands at 81.73% .
