= Gavaravaram =

- Census Town
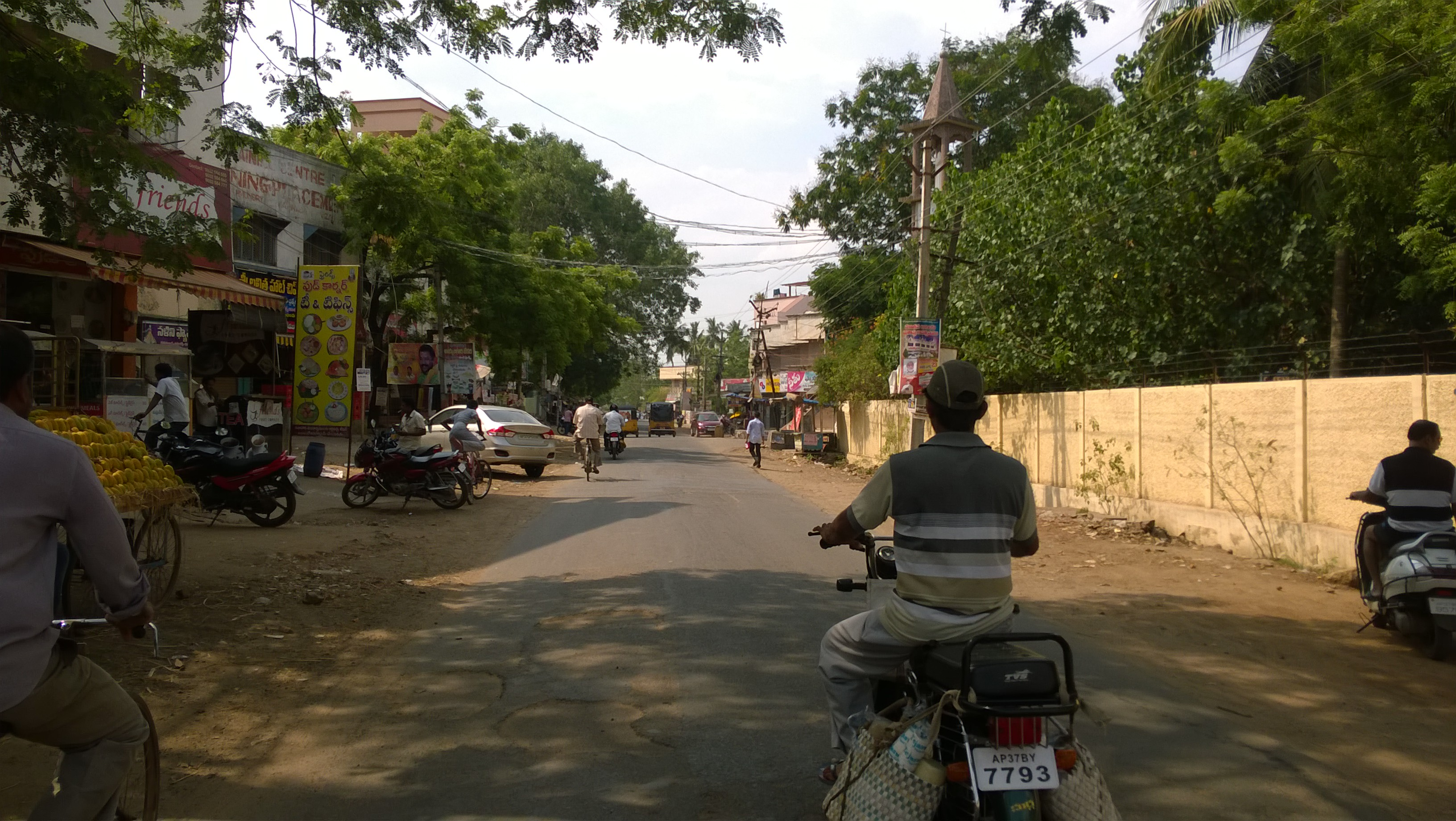
- Nuzividu road in Gavaravaram

- Location in Andhra Pradesh, India
- Coordinates: 16.43137°N 80.05154°E
- Country: India
- State: Andhra Pradesh
- District: Eluru
- Mandal: Eluru

Area
  - Total: 1.40 km^{2} (0.54 sq mi)
- Elevation: 22 m (72 ft)

Population (2011)
  - Total: 10,029
  - Density: 7,160/km^{2} (18,600/sq mi)

Languages
  - Official: Telugu
- Time zone: UTC+05:30 (IST)
- Postal code: 534 004
- Vehicle registration: AP–37

Gavaravaram is a census town in Eluru district of the Indian state of Andhra Pradesh. Gavaravaram is also known as Venkayapalam because of Gopina Venkana Garu (1914-1991) who once owned most areas of the village. It is located in Eluru mandal of Eluru revenue division. The town is a constituent of Eluru urban agglomeration.

== Demographics ==
As of 2011 Census of India, Gavaravaram had a population of 10,029. The total population constitute, 4,927 males and 5,102 females —a sex ratio of 1036 females per 1000 males. 761 children are in the age group of 0–6 years, with child sex ratio of 816 girls per 1000 boys. The average literacy rate stands at 94.18% with 8,729 literates.

== Education ==
The primary and secondary school education is imparted by government, aided and private schools, under the School Education Department of the state. The medium of instruction followed by different schools are English, Telugu.
