= Prathikollanka =

- village
- Interactive map of Prathikollanka
- Location of Prathikollanka in Andhra Pradesh, India Prathikollanka (India)
- Coordinates: 16.623306°N 81.250377°E
- Country: India
- State: Andhra Pradesh
- District: Eluru
- Mandal: Mandal

Population (2011)
  - Total: 3,479

Languages
  - Official: Telugu
- Time zone: UTC+5:30 (IST)
- PIN: 534 004
- Telephone code: 08812

Prathikollanka is a village in Eluru district in the state of Andhra Pradesh in India. It is 22 km from the city of Eluru, the headquarters of West Godavari Dist.

== Demographics ==
As of 2011 census, Prathikollanka had a population of 3,479 of which 1,762 were males and 1,717 females. The average sex ratio was 974. The child population was 340 (9.77 % of the total) with a sex ratio 771. In 2011, the literacy rate of Prathikollanka was 64.35%, compared to 67.02% in Andhra Pradesh as a whole.
