= Burugagudem =

- Village
- Interactive map of Burugagudem
- Location in Andhra Pradesh, India Burugagudem (India)
- Coordinates: 16.6826°N 81.1113°E
- Country: India
- State: Andhra Pradesh
- District: Eluru

Government
  - Body: Gram Panchayat

Population (2011)
  - Total: 144

Languages
  - Official: Telugu
- Time zone: UTC+5:30 (IST)
- PIN: 534 437

Borugagudem also spelled Burugu Gudem is a village in Eluru district of the Indian state of Andhra Pradesh. It is located in Pedapadu mandal of Eluru revenue division. The nearest train station is Bhadrachalam (BDCR) located at a distance of 31.2 KM.

== Demographics ==
As of 2011 Census of India, Burugagudem had a population of 114. The total population constitute, 67 males and 77 females with a sex ratio of 1149 females per 1000 males. 15 children are in the age group of 0–6 years with sex ratio of 667. The average literacy rate stands at 80.62%.
