= Kokkirapadu =

- Village
- Interactive map of Kokkirapadu
- Location in Andhra Pradesh, India Kokkirapadu (India)
- Coordinates: 16.6875°N 81.0058°E
- Country: India
- State: Andhra Pradesh
- District: Eluru

Government
  - Body: Gram Panchayat

Population (2011)
  - Total: 2,177

Languages
  - Official: Telugu
- Time zone: UTC+5:30 (IST)
- PIN: 534 007

Kokkirapadu is a village in Eluru district of the Indian state of Andhra Pradesh. It is located in Pedapadu mandal of Eluru revenue division. The nearest railway station is at Vatlur (VAT) located at a distance of 4.4 km.

== Demographics ==
As of 2011 Census of India, Kokkirapadu had a population of 2177. The total population constitutes 1129 males and 1048 females with a sex ratio of 928 females per 1000 males. 227 children are in the age group of 0–6 years with sex ratio of 802. The average literacy rate stands at 66.56%.
