= Powerpet =

- Neighbourhood
- పవర్ పేట
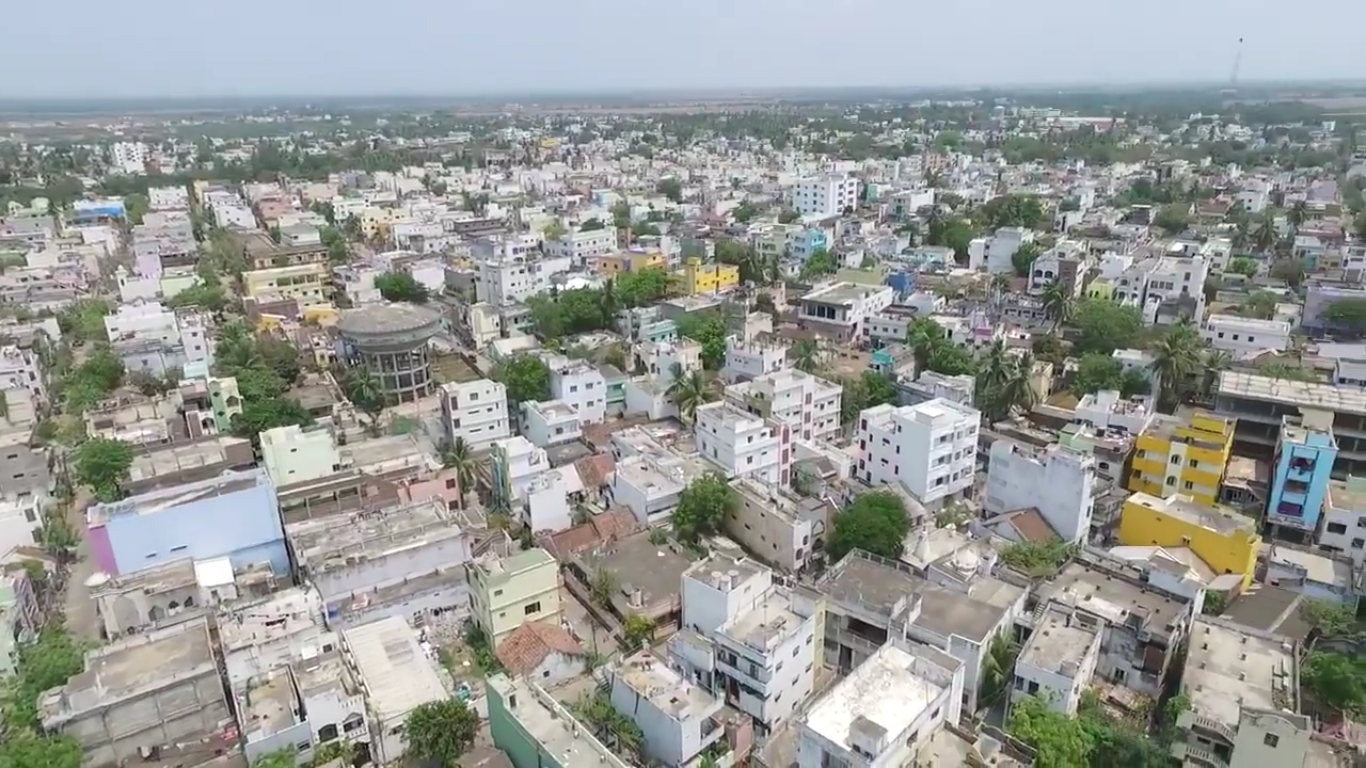

- Location within Andhra Pradesh
- Coordinates: 16.4245°N 81.0601°E
- Country: India
- State: Andhra Pradesh
- District: Eluru
- City: Eluru

Languages
  - Official: Telugu
- PIN: 534002
- Vehicle registration: AP-39

Powerpet [ పవర్ పేట ] is a suburb of Eluru city. It is located in the II-town area Police Jurisdiction of the city. An underpass is constructed below the railway line to connect Powerpet with RR Peta Area.

== History ==
Between 1893 and 1896, 1,288 km (800 mi) of the East Coast State Railway, between Vijayawada and Cuttack, was opened for Freight & Civilian traffic and Halt Station was Constructed. It is named after British railway engineer Sir Power in memory of his contribution to the locality's development of suburb.

== Demographics ==
There are a total population of 10,000 people living in 2,000 houses in Powerpet.

== Transport ==
Many Arterial roads passes through Powerpet. Eluru Old bus station is situated in this locality. Chennai-Kolkata National railway line divides Powerpet from 1-Town. Powerpet railway station provides railway connectivity to this region.

== Places of worship ==
- Sri Kashi Annapurna Sametha Visweshwara Swamy Vari Temple
- Sri Vasudevalayam

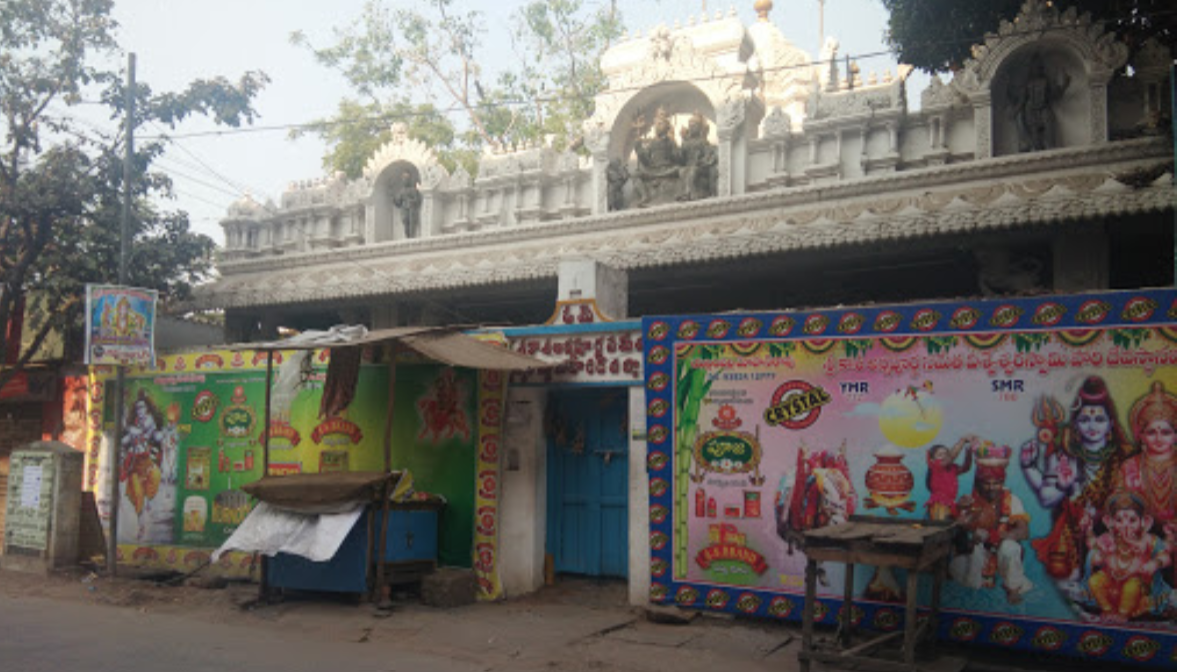
A Picture of Sri Kashi Annapurna Sametha Vishweshwara Swamy Temple

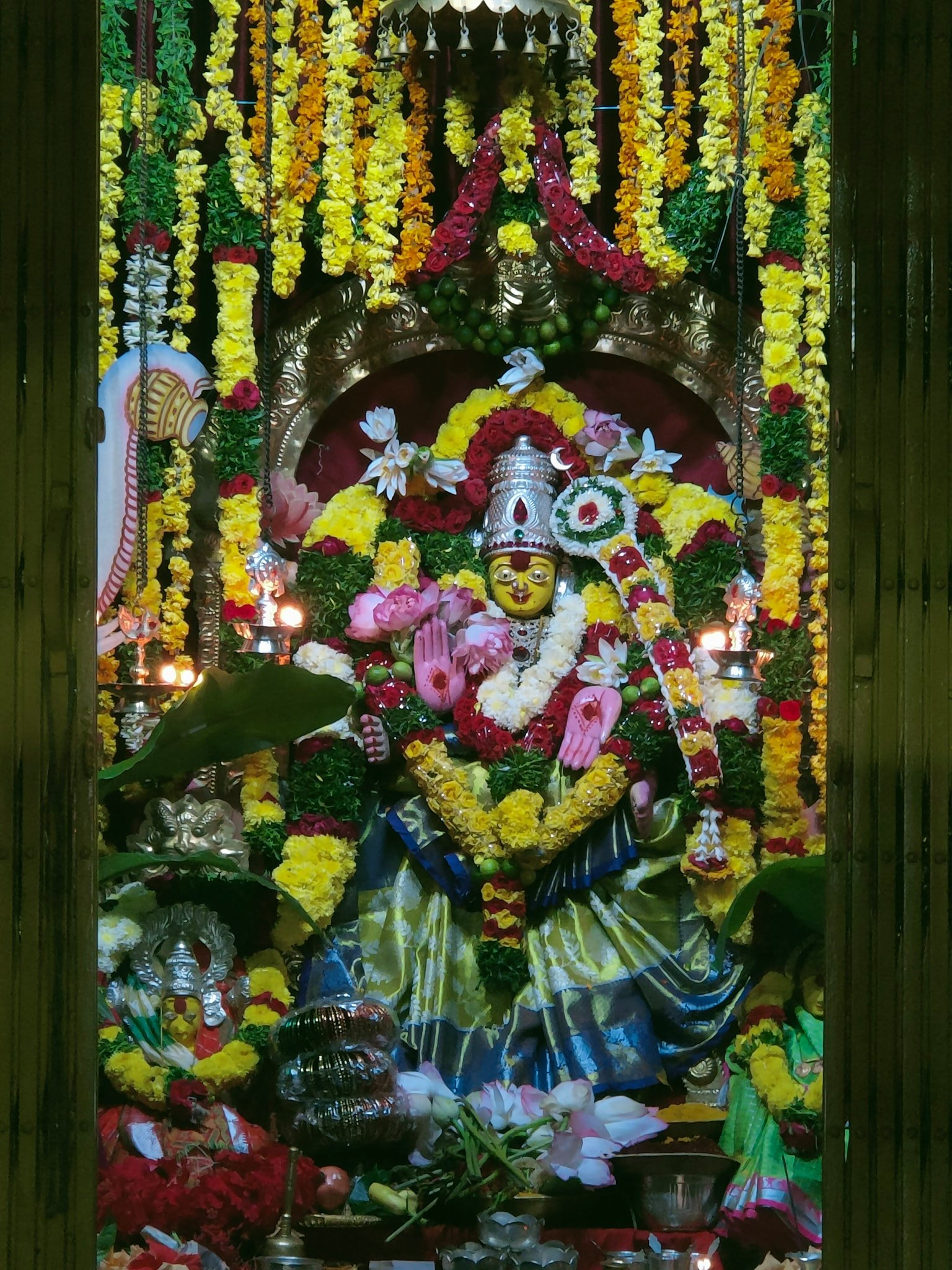
Saraswathi Devi Picture at Sri Kashi Annapurna Sametha Vishweshwara Swamy Temple
