= Mupparru =

- Village
- Interactive map of Mupparru
- Location in Andhra Pradesh, India Mupparru (India)
- Coordinates: 16.4154°N 81.313°E
- Country: India
- State: Andhra Pradesh
- District: Eluru

Government
  - Body: Gram Panchayat

Population (2011)
  - Total: 4,062

Languages
  - Official: Telugu
- Time zone: UTC+5:30 (IST)
- PIN: 534002

Mupparru is a village in Pedapadu mandal of Eluru district of the Indian state of Andhra Pradesh. It is located at a distance of 5 km from Eluru New bus station.

== Demographics ==
As of 2011 Census of India, Vatluru had a population of 4062. The total population constitute, 2037 males and 2025 females —a sex ratio of 994 females per 1000 males. 455 children are in the age group of 0–6 years with sex ratio 1156. The average literacy rate stands at 72.30% with 11,403 literates.
