= Bhimadolu railway station =

Railway station in Andhra Pradesh, India

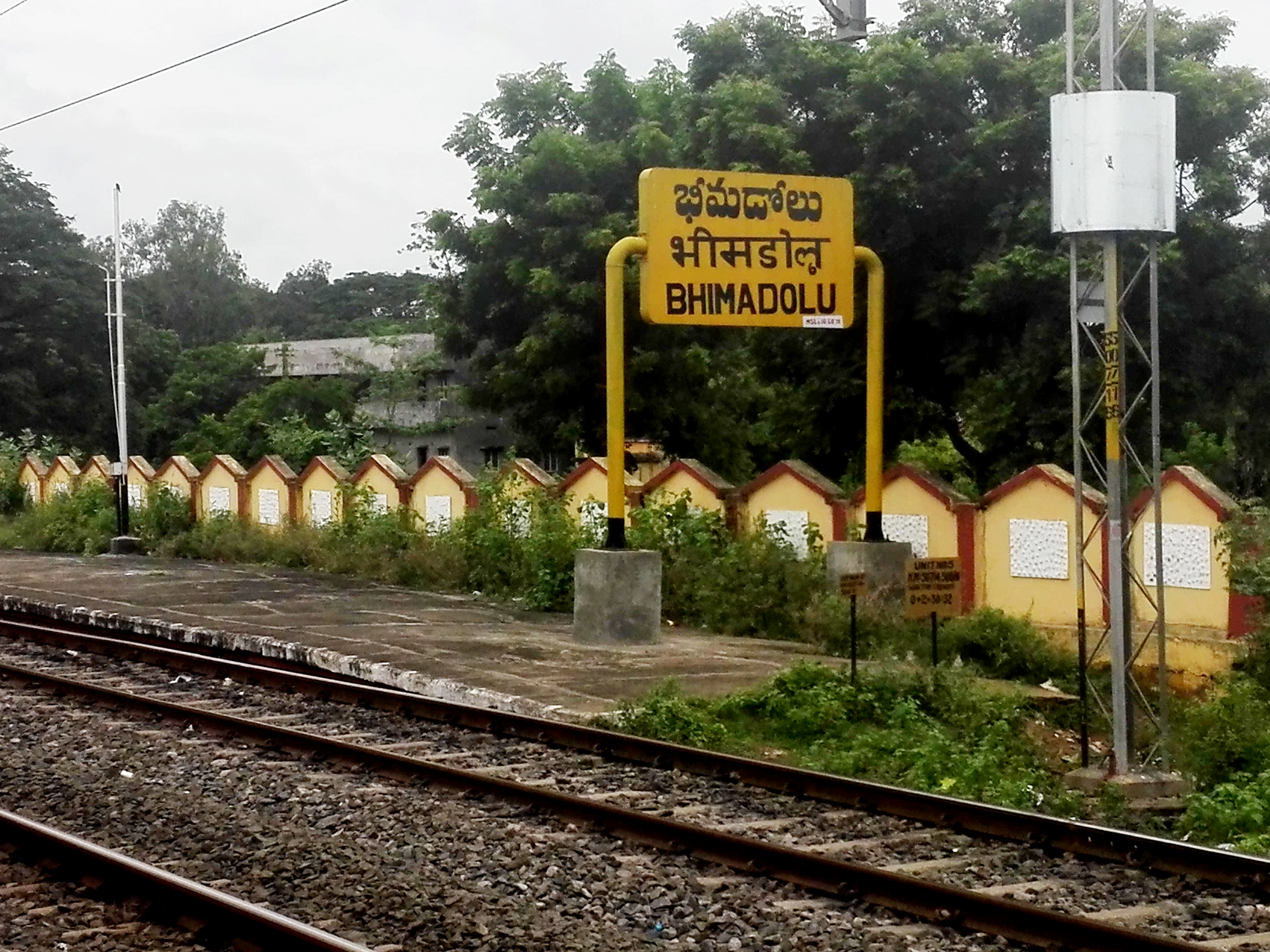
- Bhimadole railway station name board

General information
- Location: Bhimadole, West Godavari district, Andhra Pradesh; India
- Coordinates: 16.8083°N 81.2607°E
- Elevation: 22 m (72 ft)
- System: Indian Railways station
- Owner: Indian Railways
- Operator: South Coast Railway
- Line: Visakhapatnam–Vijayawada section of Howrah–Chennai main line
- Platforms: 3
- Tracks: 5 5 ft 6 in (1,676 mm) broad gauge

Construction
- Structure type: Standard (on-ground station)
- Parking: Not available

Other information
- Station code: BMD
- Zone(s): South Coast Railway
- Division(s): Vijayawada

History
- Opened: 1893–96
- Electrified: 1995–96
Location
- Location within Andhra Pradesh Location within India
- Interactive map

Bhimadolu railway station (station code:BMD), is an Indian Railways station located in Bhimadolu, Andhra Pradesh. It lies on the Vijayawada–Nidadavolu loop line of Howrah–Chennai main line and is administered under Vijayawada railway division of South Coast Railway zone. It serves as a halt for sixteen trains every day.

== History ==
Between 1893 and 1896, 1,288 km (800 mi) of the East Coast State Railway, between Vijayawada and Cuttack, was opened for traffic. The southern part of the East Coast State Railway (from Waltair to Vijayawada) was taken over by Madras Railway in 1901.

== Electrification ==
The Mustabad–Gannavaram–Nuzvid–Bhimadolu sector was electrified in 1995–96.

== Classification ==
Bhimadole railway station is categorized as a Non-Suburban Grade-6 (NSG-6) station in the Vijayawada railway division.

Preceding station	Indian Railways	Following station
Tadepalligudem towards ?	South Coast Railway zone Visakhapatnam–Vijayawada section of Howrah–Chennai main line	Sitampet towards ?
