= Vatluru =

- village
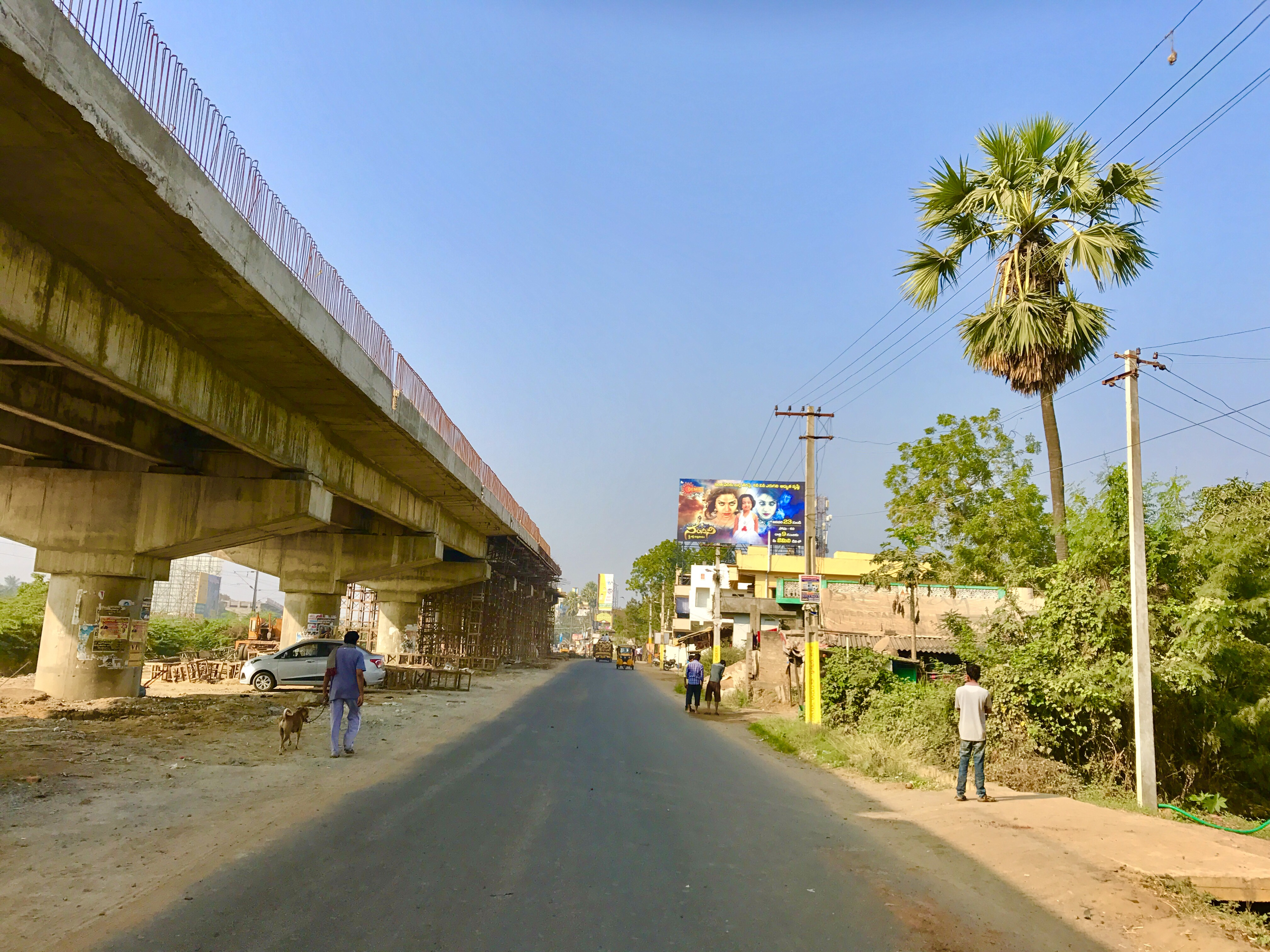
- Vatluru Flyover Under Construction
- Interactive map of Vatluru
- Location in Andhra Pradesh, India Vatluru (India)
- Coordinates: 16.4954°N 81.3112°E
- Country: India
- State: Andhra Pradesh
- District: Eluru

Government
  - Body: Gram Panchayat

Population (2011)
  - Total: 14,368

Languages
  - Official: Telugu
- Time zone: UTC+5:30 (IST)
- PIN: 534007

Vatluru is a village in Eluru district of the Indian state of Andhra Pradesh. It is located in Pedapadu mandal.

== Demographics ==
As of 2011 Census of India, Vatluru had a population of 14,368. The total population constitute, 6,780 males and 7,588 females —a sex ratio of 1119 females per 1000 males. 1,077 children are in the age group of 0–6 years, of which 528 are boys and 549 are girls. The average literacy rate stands at 85.80% with 11,403 literates.

== Transport ==
Vatluru is well connected by road. APS RTC busses from Eluru, Vijayawada, Machilipatnam and Hanuman Junction stops here. Vatluru railway station serves Vatluru. It has halt to passenger services. Eluru railway station is the nearest major railway station. Vatluru Railgate is well known for traffic.
