= Denduluru railway station =

Railway station in Andhra Pradesh, India

Denduluru
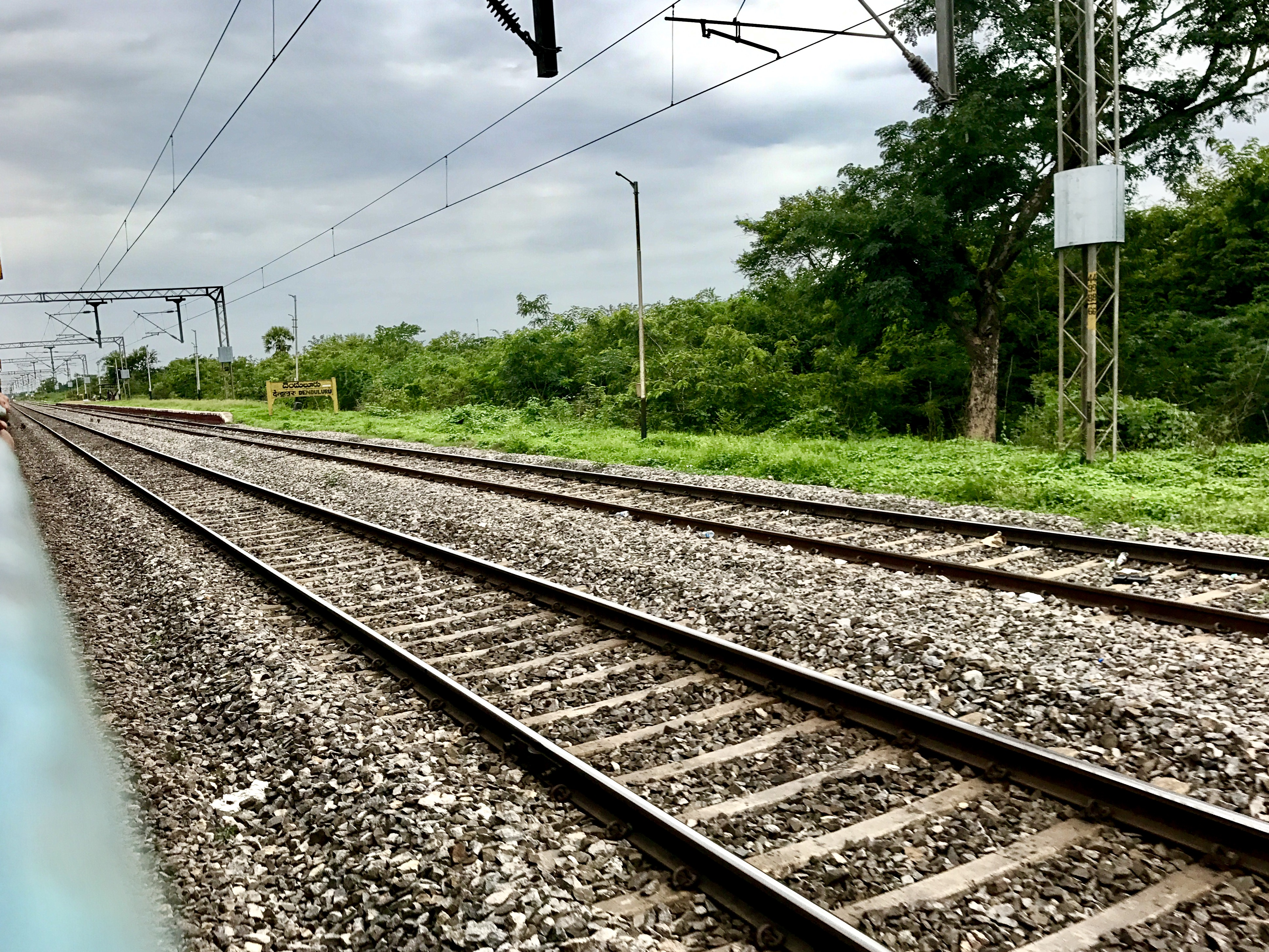

General information
- Location: Denduluru, Eluru, Andhra Pradesh; India
- Coordinates: 16°46′54″N 81°10′50″E
- Elevation: 22 m (72 ft)
- System: Indian Railways station
- Owner: Indian Railways
- Operator: South Coast Railway
- Line: Visakhapatnam–Vijayawada section of Howrah–Chennai main line
- Platforms: 2, 1 side platform is cement and another gravel
- Tracks: 2 broad gauge 1,676 mm (5 ft 6 in)

Construction
- Structure type: Standard (on-ground station)
- Parking: Not available

Other information
- Status: Active
- Station code: DEL
- Division(s): Vijayawada

History
- Opened: 1893–96
- Electrified: 1995–96
Location
- Location within Andhra Pradesh Location within India
- Interactive map

Denduluru railway station (station code:DEL) is an Indian Railways station nearby Eluru city of Andhra Pradesh. It lies on the Vijayawada–Nidadavolu loop line of Howrah–Chennai main line and is administered under Vijayawada railway division of South Coast Railway zone. It halts for nine trains every day.

== History ==
Between 1893 and 1896, 1,288 km (800 mi) of the East Coast State Railway, between Vijayawada and Cuttack, was opened for traffic. The southern part of the East Coast State Railway (from Waltair to Vijayawada) was taken over by Madras Railway in 1901.

== Electrification ==
The Mustabad–Gannavaram–Nuzvid–Bhimadolu sector was electrified in 1995–96.

== Classification ==
In terms of earnings and outward passengers handled, Denduluru is categorized as a Non-Suburban Grade-6 (NSG-6) railway station. Based on the re–categorization of Indian Railway stations for the period of 2017–18 and 2022–23, an NSG–6 category station earns nearly ₹1 crore and handles close to 1 million passengers.

Preceding station	Indian Railways	Following station
Sitampet towards Visakhapatnam	South Coast Railway zone Visakhapatnam–Vijayawada section of Howrah–Chennai main line	Eluru towards Vijayawada
