= Epuru, Eluru district =

Epuru Apuru
- Village
- Interactive map of Epuru
- Location in Andhra Pradesh, India Epuru (India)
- Coordinates: 16.38294°N 80.58299°E
- Country: India
- State: Andhra Pradesh
- District: Eluru

Government
  - Body: Gram Panchayat

Area
  - Total: 6.29 km^{2} (2.43 sq mi)

Population (2011)
  - Total: 6,849
  - Density: 1,090/km^{2} (2,820/sq mi)

Languages
  - Official: Telugu
- Time zone: UTC+5:30 (IST)
- PIN: 521 105

Epuru is a village in Eluru district of the Indian state of Andhra Pradesh. It is located in Pedapadu mandal of Eluru revenue division.

== Demographics ==
As of 2011 Census of India, Epuru had a population of 6849. The total population constitute, 3413 males and 3436 females —a sex ratio of 1007 females per 1000 males. 746 children are in the age group of 0–6 years with sex ratio of 943. The average literacy rate stands at 65.71%.
