= Edulakunta =

- Village
- Interactive map of Edulakunta
- Location in Andhra Pradesh, India Edulakunta (India)
- Coordinates: 16.6448°N 81.0823°E
- Country: India
- State: Andhra Pradesh
- District: Eluru

Government
  - Body: Gram Panchayat

Population (2011)
  - Total: 66

Languages
  - Official: Telugu
- Time zone: UTC+5:30 (IST)
- PIN: 534 002

Edulakunta is a village in Eluru district of the Indian state of Andhra Pradesh. It is located in Pedapadu mandal of Eluru revenue division. Kamareddi railway Station is the nearest train station located at a distance of more than 10Km.

== Demographics ==
As of 2011 Census of India, Edulakunta had a population of 66. With a sex ratio of 1276 females to every 1000 men, there are 29 males and 37 females in the whole population. 3 children are in the age group of 0–6 years with sex ratio of 0. The average literacy rate stands at 65.08%.
