= Powerpet railway station =

Indian railway station

Power Pet
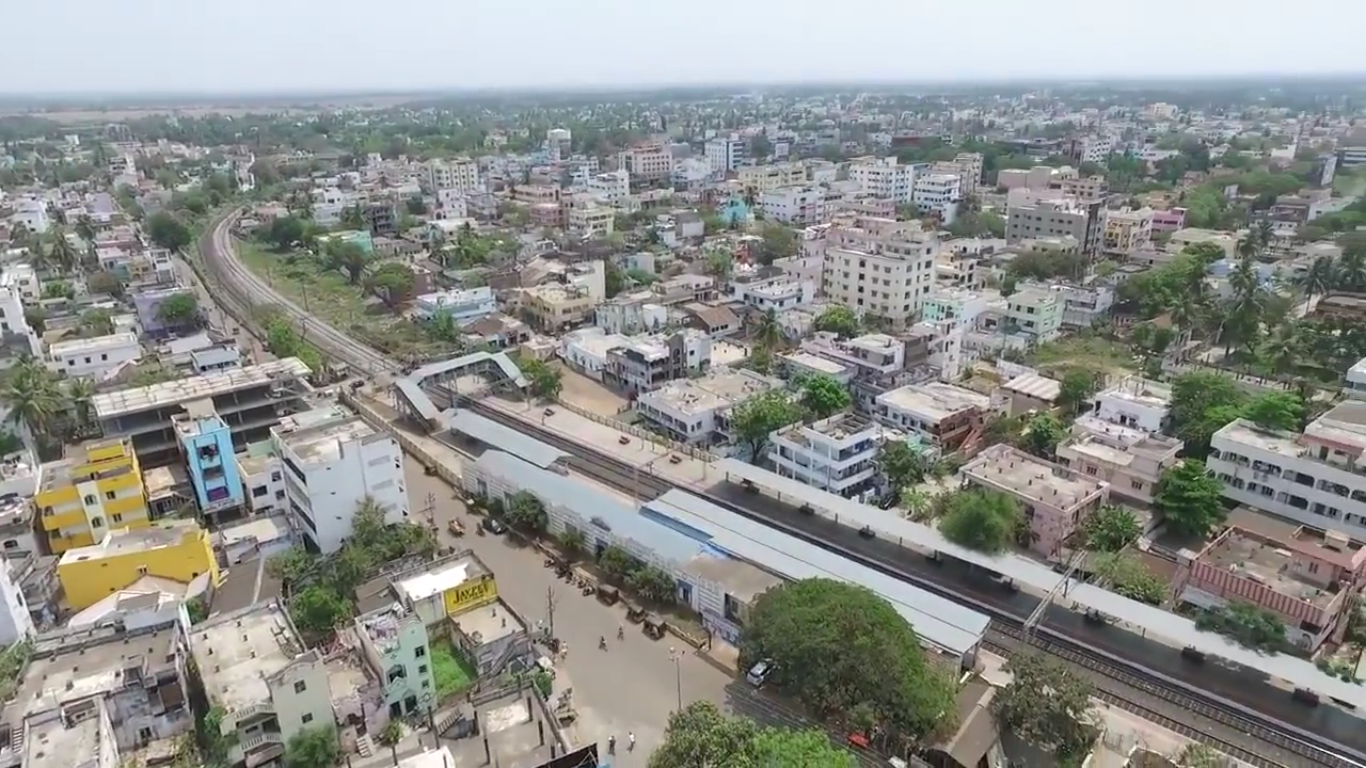
- Aerial view of Powerpet railway station

General information
- Location: Powerpet, Eluru, Eluru district, Andhra Pradesh; India
- Coordinates: 16°42′47″N 81°06′24″E
- Elevation: 22 m (72 ft)
- System: Express train and Passenger train station
- Owner: Indian Railways
- Operator: South Central Railway
- Line: Visakhapatnam–Vijayawada section of Howrah–Chennai main line
- Platforms: 2 side platforms
- Tracks: 2, 1,676 mm (5 ft 6 in) broad gauge

Construction
- Structure type: Standard (on-ground station)
- Parking: Available

Other information
- Status: Active
- Station code: PRH
- Division(s): Vijayawada

History
- Opened: 1893–96
- Electrified: 1995–96
Location
- Location within Andhra Pradesh Location within India
- Interactive map

Powerpet railway station (station code: PRH), is an Indian Railways station in Eluru city of Andhra Pradesh. It lies on the Vijayawada–Nidadavolu loop line of Howrah–Chennai main line and is administered under Vijayawada railway division of South Central Railway zone.

== History ==
Between 1893 and 1896, 1,288 km (800 mi) of the East Coast State Railway, between Vijayawada and Cuttack, was opened for traffic. The southern part of the East Coast State Railway (from Waltair to Vijayawada) was taken over by Madras Railway in 1901.

== Electrification ==
The Mustabad–Gannavaram–Nuzvid–Bhimadolu sector was electrified in 1995–96.

== Classification ==
In terms of earnings and outward passengers handled, Powerpet is categorized as a Non-Suburban Grade-5 (NSG-5) railway station. Based on the re–categorization of Indian Railway stations for the period of 2017–18 and 2022–23, an NSG–5 category station earns between ₹1–₹10 crore and handles 1–2 million passengers.

== Station amenities ==
It is one of the 38 stations in the division to be equipped with Automatic Ticket Vending Machines (ATVMs).

Preceding station	Indian Railways	Following station
Eluru towards ?	South Coast Railway zone Visakhapatnam–Vijayawada of Howrah–Chennai main line	Vatluru towards ?
