= Vatlur railway station =

Railway station in Andhra Pradesh, India

Vatlur
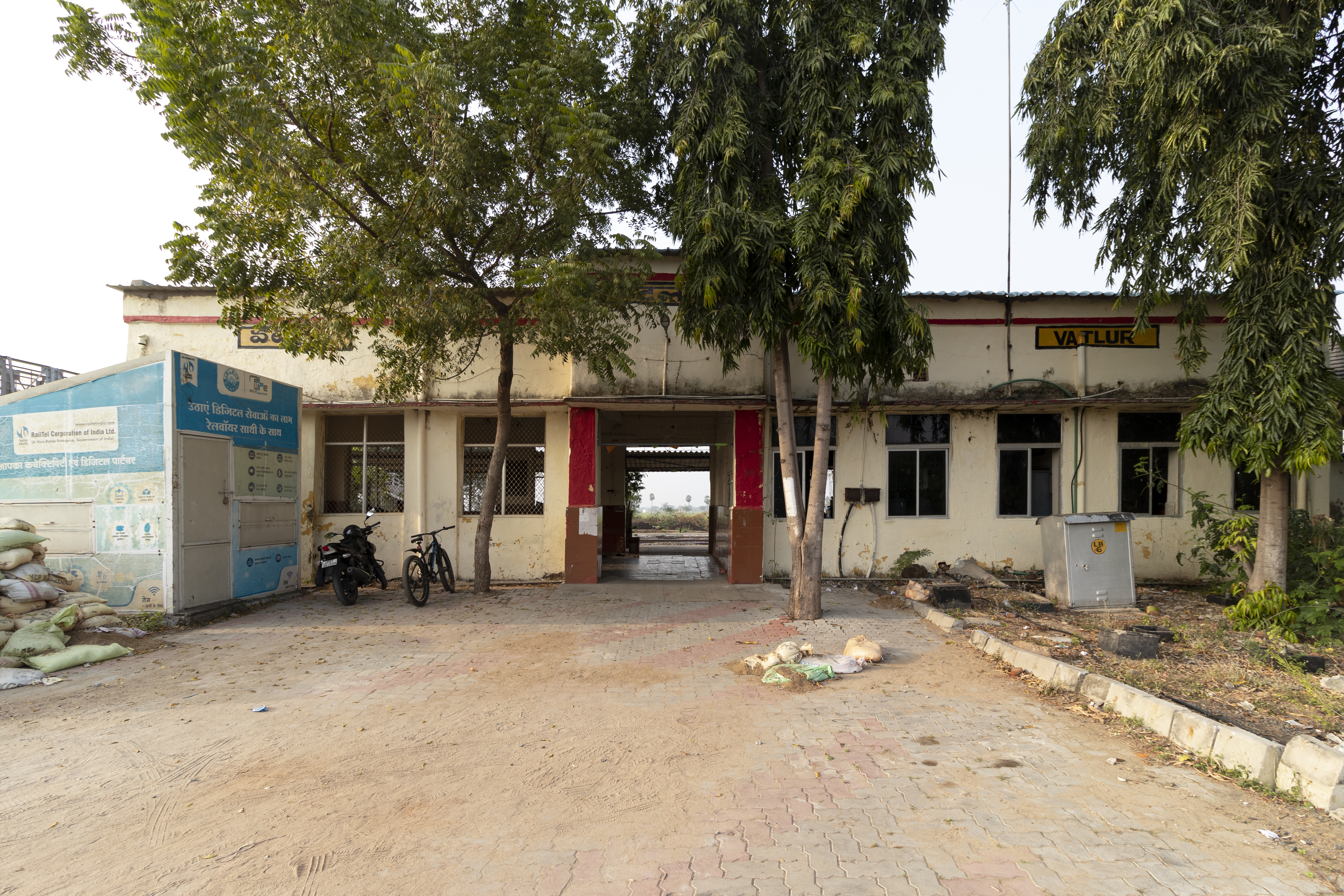
- Vatlur railway station building

General information
- Location: Vijayawada Road, Vatluru, Eluru, Andhra Pradesh; India
- Coordinates: 16°24′50″N 81°14′31″E
- Elevation: 16 metres (52 ft)
- System: Indian Railways station
- Owner: Indian Railways
- Operator: South Central Railway
- Line: Howrah–Chennai main line
- Platforms: 2
- Tracks: 4

Other information
- Status: Functioning
- Station code: VAT
- Zone(s): South Central Railway
- Division(s): Vijayawada

History
- Former names: Madras and Southern Mahratta Railway
Location
- Location within Andhra Pradesh Location within India
- Interactive map

Vatlur railway station (station code:VAT) serves the village of Vatluru in Andhra Pradesh, India. It is on the Howrah–Chennai main line around 8 km from Eluru railway station. It is under Vijayawada division of South Central Railway.

== Passenger amenities ==
It has two platforms, serving up and down trains. It has a general ticket booking counter. First platform has cement seatings for passengers. It also has a general waiting hall on first platform. Local passenger trains stop at this station.

== Electrification ==
The Visakhapatnam–Vijayawada section was completely electrified by 1997. The Howrah–Chennai route was completely electrified by 2005. A SSP is built beside Vatlur railway station.

== Classification ==
In terms of earnings and outward passengers handled, Vatlur is categorized as a Non-Suburban Grade-6 (NSG-6) railway station. Based on the re–categorization of Indian Railway stations for the period of 2017–18 and 2022–23, an NSG–6 category station earns nearly ₹1 crore and handles close to 1 million passengers.

Preceding station	Indian Railways	Following station
Powerpet towards ?	South Central Railway zone Visakhapatnam–Vijayawada section of Howrah–Chennai main line	Nuzividu towards ?
