= Eluru New bus station =

Bus station in Eluru, India

Eluru New bus station Eluru NBS
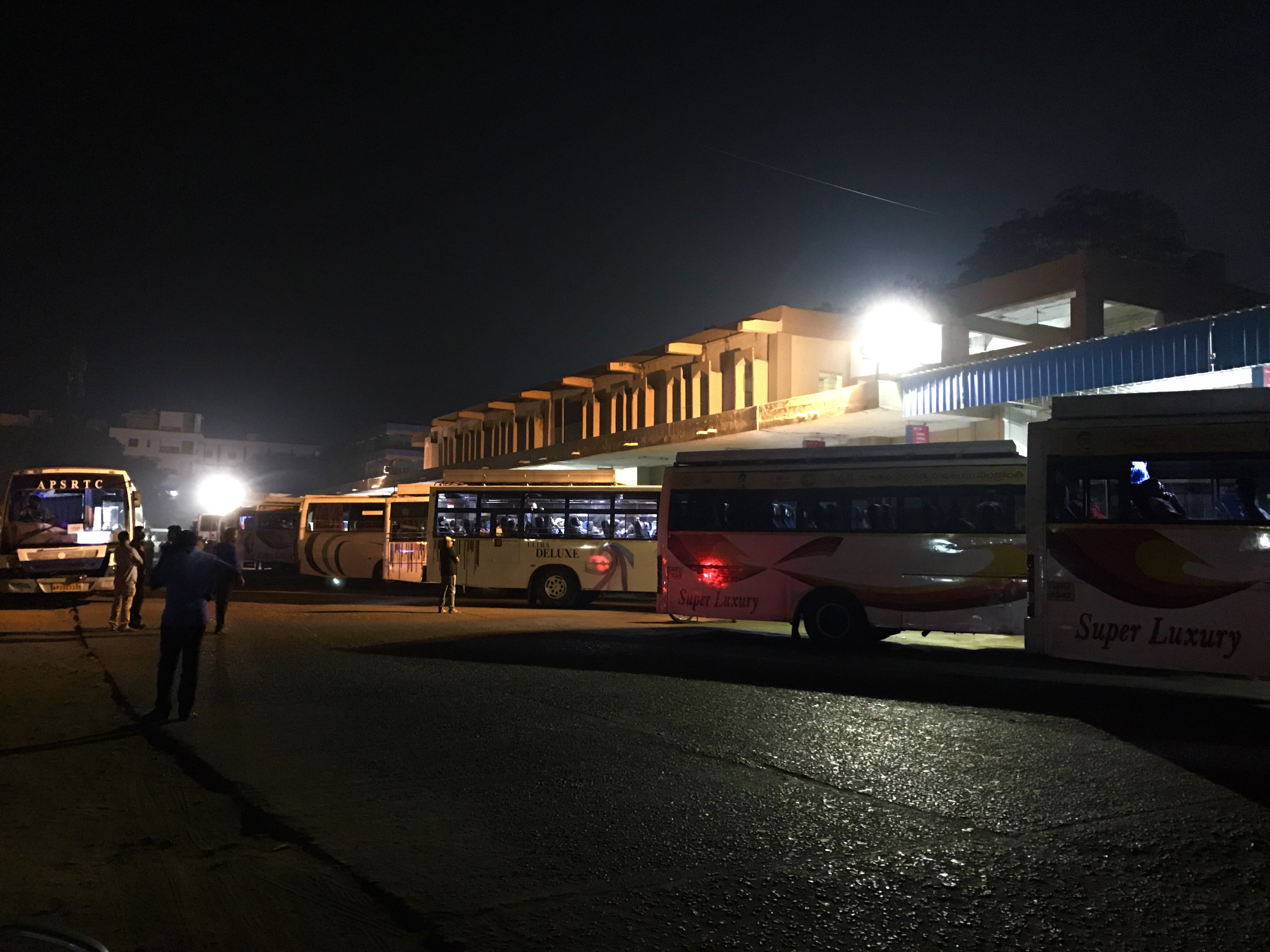
- Departure Block of Eluru New Bus station

General information
- Location: Eluru, Andhra Pradesh; India
- Coordinates: 16°42′27″N 81°05′23″E
- Owner: APSRTC
- Platforms: 22

Construction
- Structure type: standard (On ground)
- Parking: Yes

Other information
- Station code: ELR
Location
- Location within Andhra Pradesh Location within India

Eluru New bus station (or Eluru NBS) is a bus station located in Eluru city of the Indian state of Andhra Pradesh. It is owned by Andhra Pradesh State Road Transport Corporation. This is one of the major bus stations in the state, with services to all the cities and towns and to other states like Karnataka, Tamil Nadu and Telangana. It is one of the few stations equipped with 5G Internet service. The station is also equipped with a bus depot for storage and maintenance of buses.

== Expansion works ==
Now bus station expansion works are going under process while the city is said to run city buses from 2017 as the second phase of launching city buses in Andhra Pradesh cities.. Bus station developments works are under progress. CMR Group of companies s going to construct a Multiplex Theater with Shopping Complex in RTC Bus station.

== Gallery ==
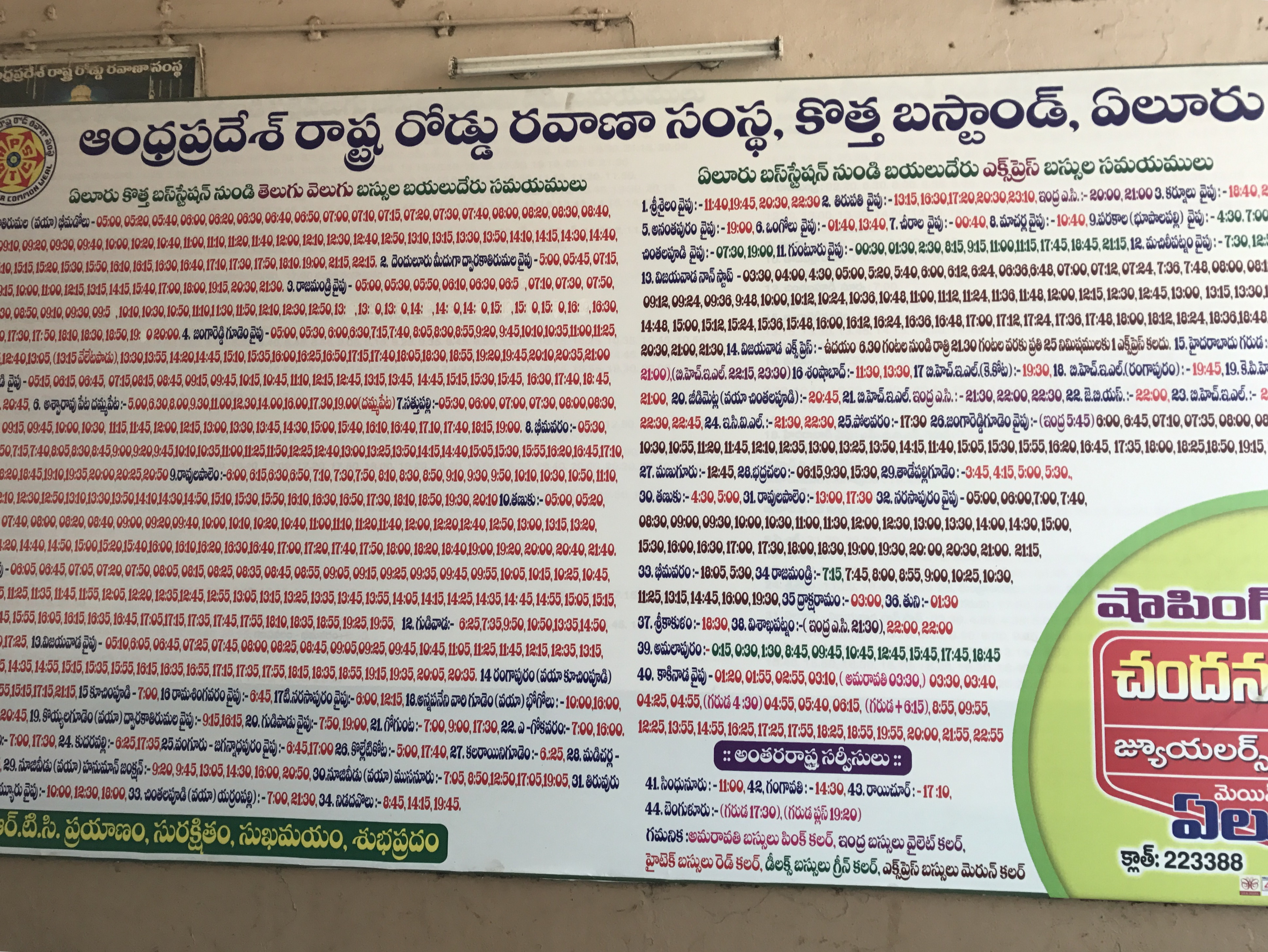
Scheduled bus service timings in Bus Station
