= Eluru Old bus station =

Bus station in Eluru, India

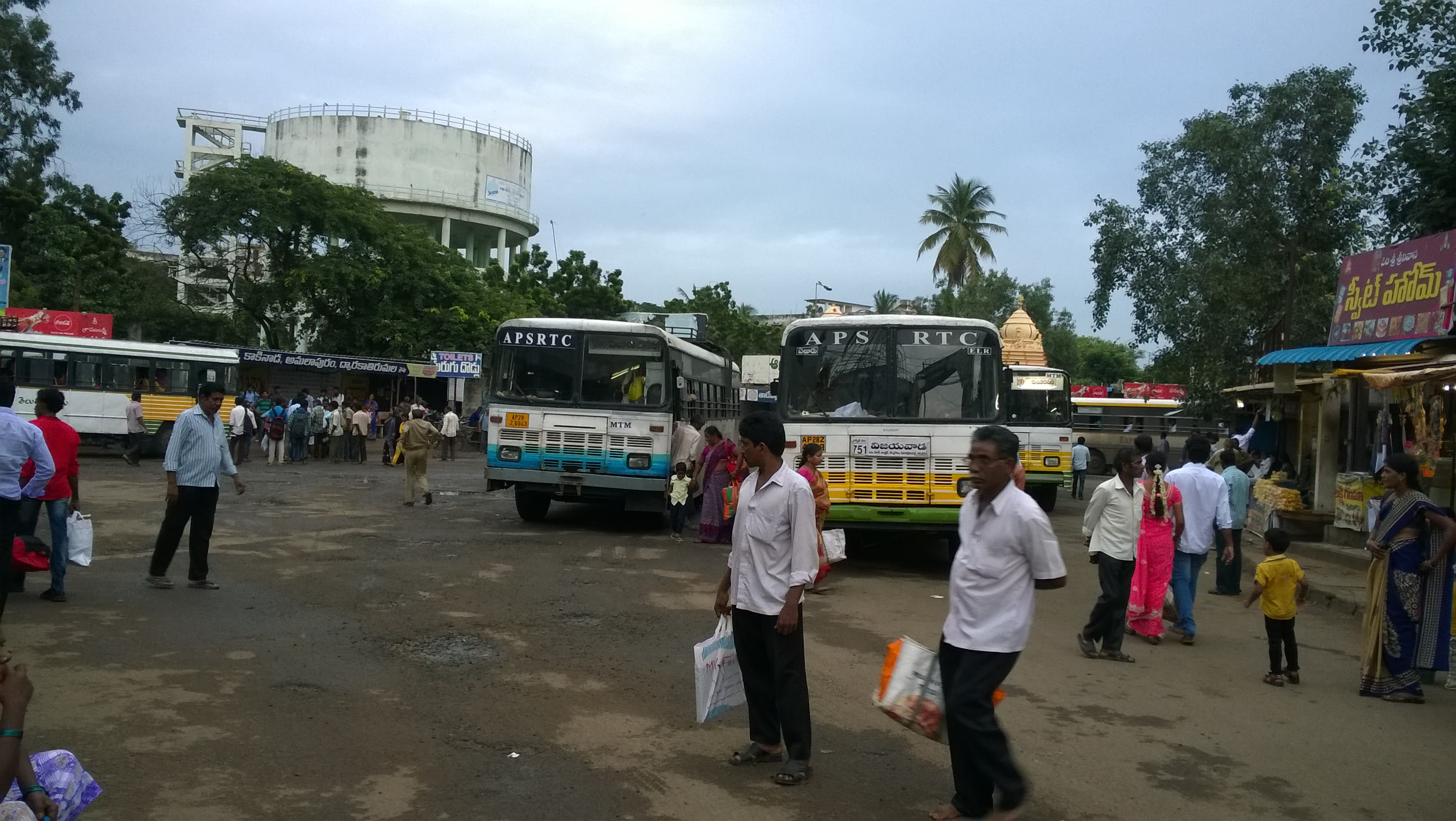
- A view Eluru Old Bus Station on a rainy day

General information
- Location: Eluru, Eluru district, Andhra Pradesh; India
- Coordinates: 16°42′24″N 81°05′58″E
- Owner: APSRTC
- Platforms: 05

Construction
- Parking: Yes

Other information
- Station code: EOBS
Location
- Location within Andhra Pradesh Location within India

Eluru Old bus station is a bus station located in Eluru city of the Indian state of Andhra Pradesh. It is owned by Andhra Pradesh State Road Transport Corporation. It operates buses to all parts of the District and to nearby cities.
