= Eluru railway station =

Railway station in Eluru (Andhra Pradesh), India

Eluru
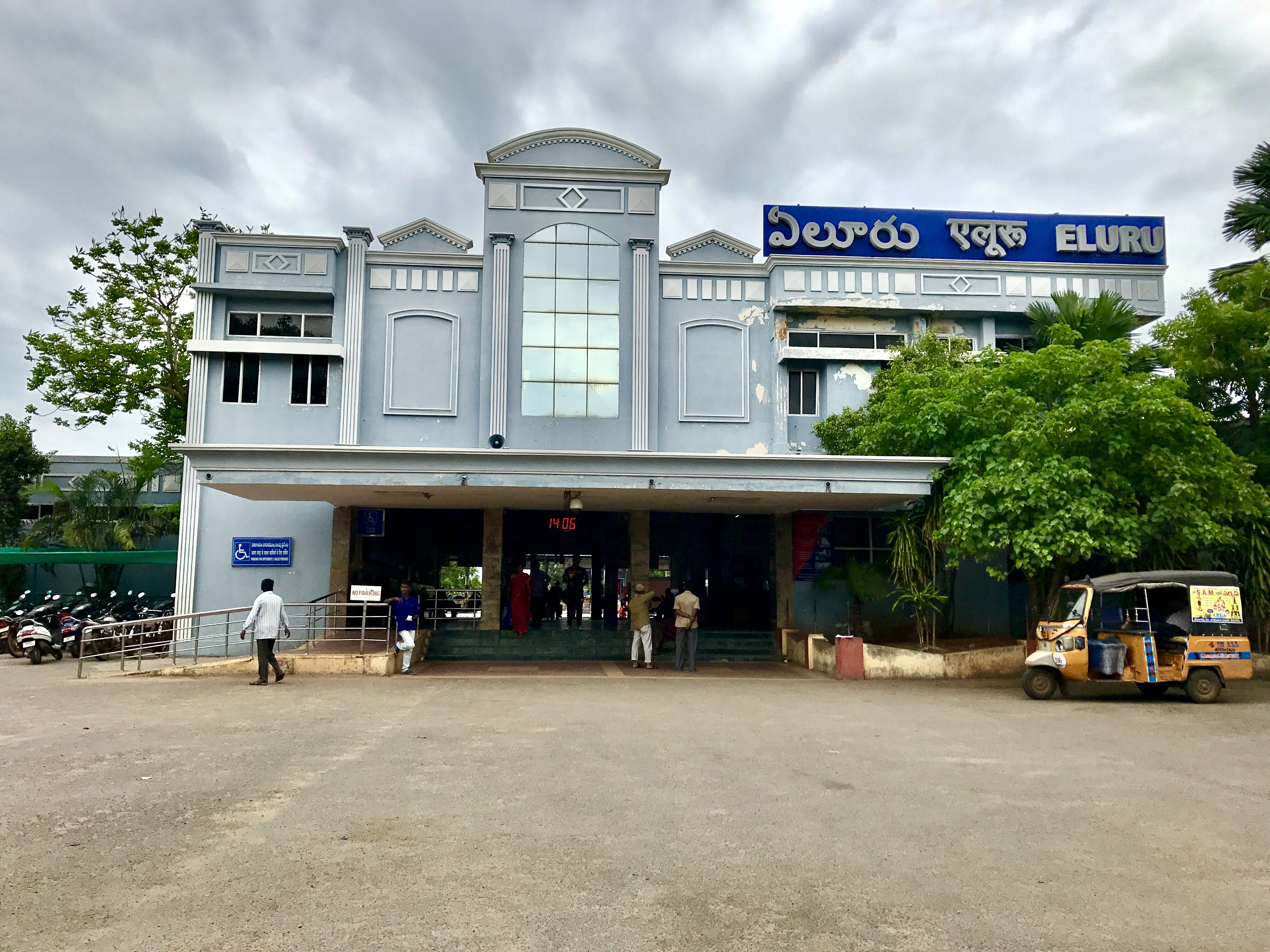
- Eluru Railway Station Main Entrance

General information
- Location: ASR Stadium Road, Eluru, Eluru district, Andhra Pradesh; India
- Coordinates: 16.7179°N 81.1198°E
- System: Commuter, Inter-city and Regional rail station
- Owner: Indian Railways
- Operator: Indian Railways
- Lines: Howrah–Chennai main line; Visakhapatnam–Vijayawada section
- Tracks: 2 5 ft 6 in (1,676 mm) broad gauge

Construction
- Structure type: Standard (on ground)
- Parking: Available
- Accessible: Disabled access

Other information
- Status: Active
- Station code: EE
- Zone(s): SCoR
- Division(s): Vijayawada
- Classification: Non-Suburban Grade-3 (NSG-3)

History
- Opened: 1893

Passengers
- 28.5 million

Services
Preceding station	Indian Railways	Following station
Denduluru towards ?	Howrah–Chennai main line	Powerpet towards ?
Route map
Location
- Location within Andhra Pradesh Location within India
- Interactive map

Eluru railway station (station code:EE) is an Indian Railways station in Eluru city of Andhra Pradesh. It lies on the Howrah–Chennai main line and is administered under Vijayawada railway division of South Coast Railway zone (formerly South Central Railway zone).

== History ==
Between 1893 and 1896, 1,288 km (800 mi) of the East Coast State Railway, between Vijayawada and Cuttack, was opened for traffic. The southern part of the East Coast State Railway (from Waltair to Vijayawada) was taken over by Madras Railway in 1901.

=== Electrification ===
The Mustabad–Gannavaram–Nuzvid–Bhimadolu sector was electrified in 1995–96.

== Classification ==
In terms of earnings and outward passengers handled, Eluru is categorized as a Non-Suburban Grade-3 (NSG-3) railway station. Based on the re–categorization of Indian Railway stations for the period of 2017–18 and 2022–23, an NSG–3 category station earns between ₹20–₹100 crore and handles 5–10 million passengers.

== Structure and amenities ==
The station is spread over an area of 31,782 m^{2} (342,100 sq ft), maintained by 17 employees. The station has 03 platforms and all the tracks are broad gauge and electrified. Almost all platforms are in same size. The station has East and West terminals equipped with reservation counters. It was 37th cleanest station in 'A'-Category, as of 2018. It is one of the 38 stations in the division to be equipped with Automatic Ticket Vending Machines (ATVMs).

== Satellite stations ==
Eluru city consists of four other railway stations. These are:

Station Name	Station Code	Railway Division
Vatluru	VAT	Vijayawada Division
Powerpet	PRH	Vijayawada Division
Denduluru	DEL	Vijayawada Division
Sitampet	STPT	Vijayawada Division
