= List of neighbourhoods in Visakhapatnam =

Visakhapatnam City

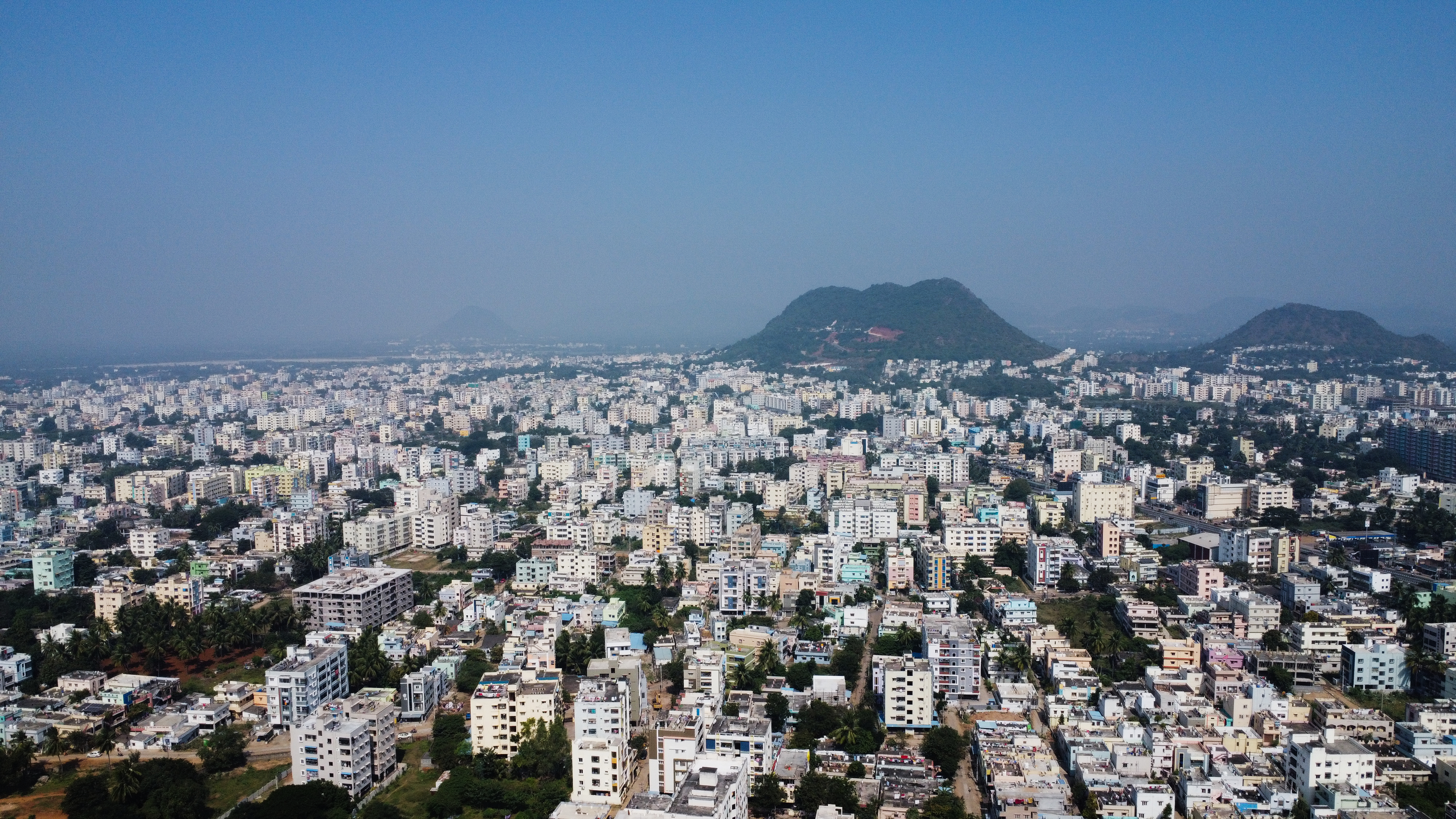
Cityscape of Sujatha Nagar and Pendurthi

Visakhapatnam is a city of South Indian State of Andhra Pradesh. old MCV is considered as the central part of city, East and Some Western Parts of city. Visakhapatnam city divided as North, South, central, East, West and suburbs of Northern, Southern and Western.

== Central Visakhapatnam ==
Central Visakhapatnam is mainly commercial and residential neighbourhood's major commercial areas are Dwaraka Nagar, Asilmetta, Daba Gardens and Siripuram

- Dwaraka Nagar
- Daba Gardens
- Asilmetta
- Siripuram
- Pithapuram Colony
- CBM Compound
- Maddilapalem
- Narasimha Nagar
- Balayya Sastri Layout
- Kailasapuram
- Seethammadhara
- Resapuvanipalem
- HB Colony
- Ramnagar
- Santhipuram
- Suryabagh
- Railway New Colony
- Venkojipalem
- Seethammapeta
- Waltair Uplands
- Dondaparthy
- Gnanapuram
- Akkayyapalem
- Shivaji Palem
- Thatichetlapalem
- Kancharapalem
- Isukathota

== North Visakhapatnam ==
North Visakhapatnam is Residential and IT hub this areas developed so rapidly in past years important areas are Rushikonda, Yendada, PM Palem and Madhurawada

- Vizianagaram
- Kommadi
- Rushikonda
- Sagar Nagar
- Yendada
- Madhurawada
- PM Palem
- Thimmapuram
- Jodugullapalem
- Kapuluppada
- Gambhiram
- Anandapuram
- Mangamaripeta

== South Visakhapatnam ==
South Visakhapatnam is mainly residential, commercial and developed industrial Neighborhoods, important localities are Gajuwaka, Kurmannapalem, Duvvada and Sheela Nagar

- Gajuwaka
- Pedagantyada
- Kurmannapalem
- Akkireddypalem
- Nathayyapalem
- Yarada
- Aganampudi
- Chinagantyada
- Nadupuru
- Duvvada
- Desapatrunipalem
- Sheela Nagar
- Sriharipuram
- Tunglam
- Mulagada
- Vadlapudi
- Ukkunagaram (Steel Plant Township)
- Gandhigram
- Gangavaram
- BHPV
- Mindi
- Scindia
- Malkapuram

== West Visakhapatnam ==
West Visakhapatnam is completely residential areas important areas are Pendurthi, Muralinagar, Sujatha Nagar and Gopalapatnam

- Gopalapatnam
- Naidu Thota
- Vepagunta
- Marripalem
- Simhachalam
- Prahaladapuram
- Pendurthi
- Chintalagraharam
- NAD
- Madhavadhara
- Sujatha Nagar
- Adavivaram
- Muralinagar
- Chinnamushidiwada
- Kakani Nagar
- Narava
- Pineapple Colony

== East Visakhapatnam ==
East Visakhapatnam is residential and commercial areas and important neighborhoods are Maharanipeta, Jagadamba Centre, MVP Colony and Pandurangapuram.

- Jagadamba Centre
- Soldierpet
- MVP Colony
- Velampeta
- Chinna Waltair
- Kirlampudi Layout
- Pandurangapuram
- Daspalla Hills
- Town Kotha Road
- Peda Waltair
- Lawsons Bay Colony
- Prakashraopeta
- Burujupeta
- Jalari Peta
- One Town
- Poorna Market
- Allipuram
- Salipeta
- Relli Veedhi
- Maharanipeta
- Chengal Rao Peta

== North West Visakhapatnam ==
mainly developed residential and health city important areas are Arilova, Chinna Gadhili and Hanumanthavaka

- Chinna Gadhili
- Visalakshi Nagar
- Arilova
- Ravindra Nagar
- Hanumanthavaka
- Adarsh Nagar

== Northern Suburbs ==
newly developing areas and mostly residential areas

- Padmanabham
- Gidijala
- Gudilova
- Tagarapuvalasa
- Bheemunipatnam
- Nidigattu
- Vellanki
- Sontyam

== Southern Suburbs ==
this southern suburbs are consist major industrial areas

- Anakapalli
- Pedamadaka
- Ravada
- Devada
- Lankelapalem
- Parawada
- Appikonda
- Atchutapuram

== Western Suburbs ==
western suburb is newly developing residential areas and educational hub

- Sabbavaram
- Devipuram
- Kothavalasa
