= Sabbavaram mandal =

Sabbavaram
- Mandal
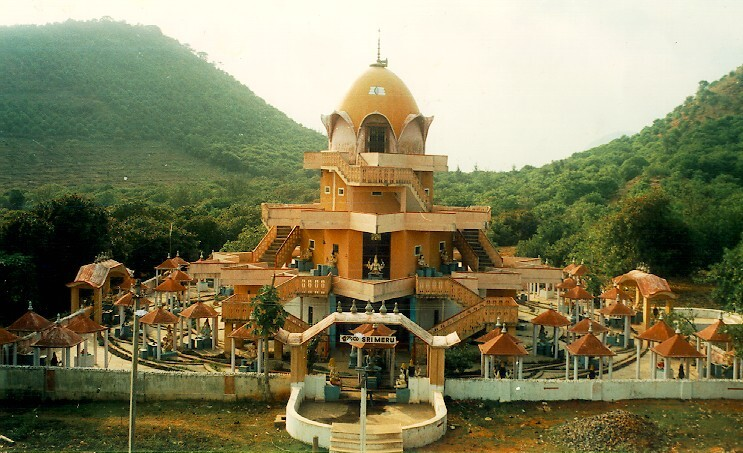
- Devipuram temple near Sabbavaram
- Interactive map of Sabbavaram
- Location in Andhra Pradesh
- Coordinates: 17.790°N 83.123°E
- Country: India
- State: Andhra Pradesh
- District: Anakapalli

Area
  - Total: 186.02 km^{2} (71.82 sq mi)
- Elevation: 20 m (66 ft)

Languages
- Time zone: UTC+5:30 (IST)
- Postal code: 531035
- Vehicle Registration: AP31 (Former); AP39 (from 30 January 2019)

Sabbavaram mandal is a mandal in Anakapalli district in the state of Andhra Pradesh in India. Its headquarter is at Sabbavaram

There are three universities in the mandal

- Damodaram Sanjivayya National Law University
- Indian Institute of Petroleum and Energy
- Indian Maritime University, Visakhapatnam

Sabbavaram has an average elevation of 20 metres (66 ft).

== List of villages in sabbavaram mandal ==
- Amruthapuram
- Antakapalle
- Aripaka
- Asakapalle
- Ayyannapalem
- Bangarammapalem
- Batajangalapalem
- Boduvalasa
- Chintala agraharam
- Dongala marri sitarampuram
- Elluppi
- Erukunaidupalem
- Gali Bhimavaram
- Gangavaram
- Gotiwada
- Gullepalle
- Iruvada
- Lagisettipalem
- Mogalipuram
- Nallaregupalem
- Narapadu
- Pydivada
- Pydivada Agraharam
- Rayapura Agraharam
- Sabbavaram-Gollalapalem
- Sabbavaram Agraharam-Sabbavaram
- Tekkalipalem
- Vangali
- Vedullanarava
- Vippaka Agaraharam
