= Lawsons Bay Colony =

- Neighbourhood
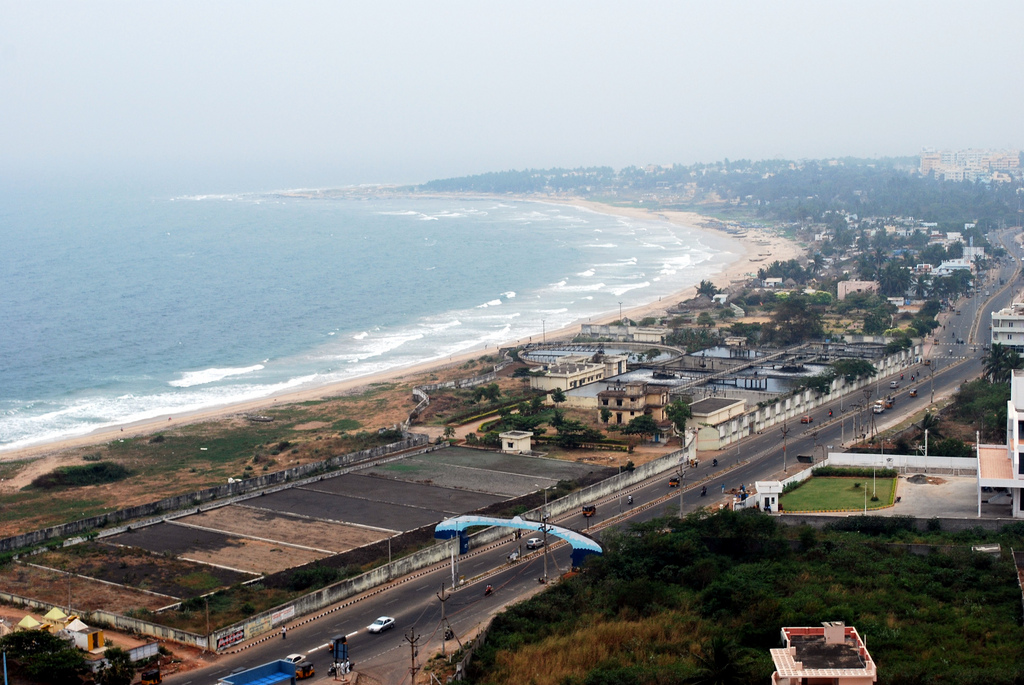
- Lawsons bay beach

- Location in Visakhapatnam
- Coordinates: 17°44′02″N 83°20′13″E
- Country: India
- State: Andhra Pradesh
- District: Visakhapatnam

Government
  - Body: Greater Visakhapatnam Municipal Corporation

Languages
  - Official: Telugu
- Time zone: UTC+5:30 (IST)
- PIN: 530017
- Vehicle registration: AP-31

Lawsons Bay Colony is a neighbourhood located in the city of Visakhapatnam in Andhra Pradesh, India.

== About ==
It is located beside MVP Colony. It has a popular temple, Gundicha temple.

== Transport ==
Lawsons Bay Colony is well connected with Sagar Nagar, Dwaraka Nagar, Daba Gardens and Jagadamba Centre.

APSRTC routes

Route number	Start	End	Via
900	Maddilapalem	Railway Station	Venkojipalem, MVP Colony, Pedawaltair, Siripuram, RTC Complex
14	Venkojipalem	Old Head Post Office	Appughar, Chinnawaltair, Siripuram, Jagadamba Centre, Town Kotharoad
17K	Bhimunipatnam	Old Head Post Office	INS Kalinga, Thimmapuram, Rushikonda, Sagarnagar, Appughar, MVP Colony, Pedawaltair, Siripuram, RTC Complex, Jagadamba Centre, Town Kotharoad
900K	Bhimunipatnam	RTC Complex	INS Kalinga, Thimmapuram, Rushikonda, Sagarnagar, Appughar, MVP Colony, Pedawaltair, Siripuram
210	Ravindra Nagar	Gantyada HB Colony	Hanumanthuwaka, Appughar, MVP Colony, Pedawaltair, Siripuram, RK Beach, Jagadamba Centre, Town Kotharoad, Convent, Scindia, Malkapuram, New Gajuwaka, Pedagantyada
