= TU 142 Aircraft Museum =

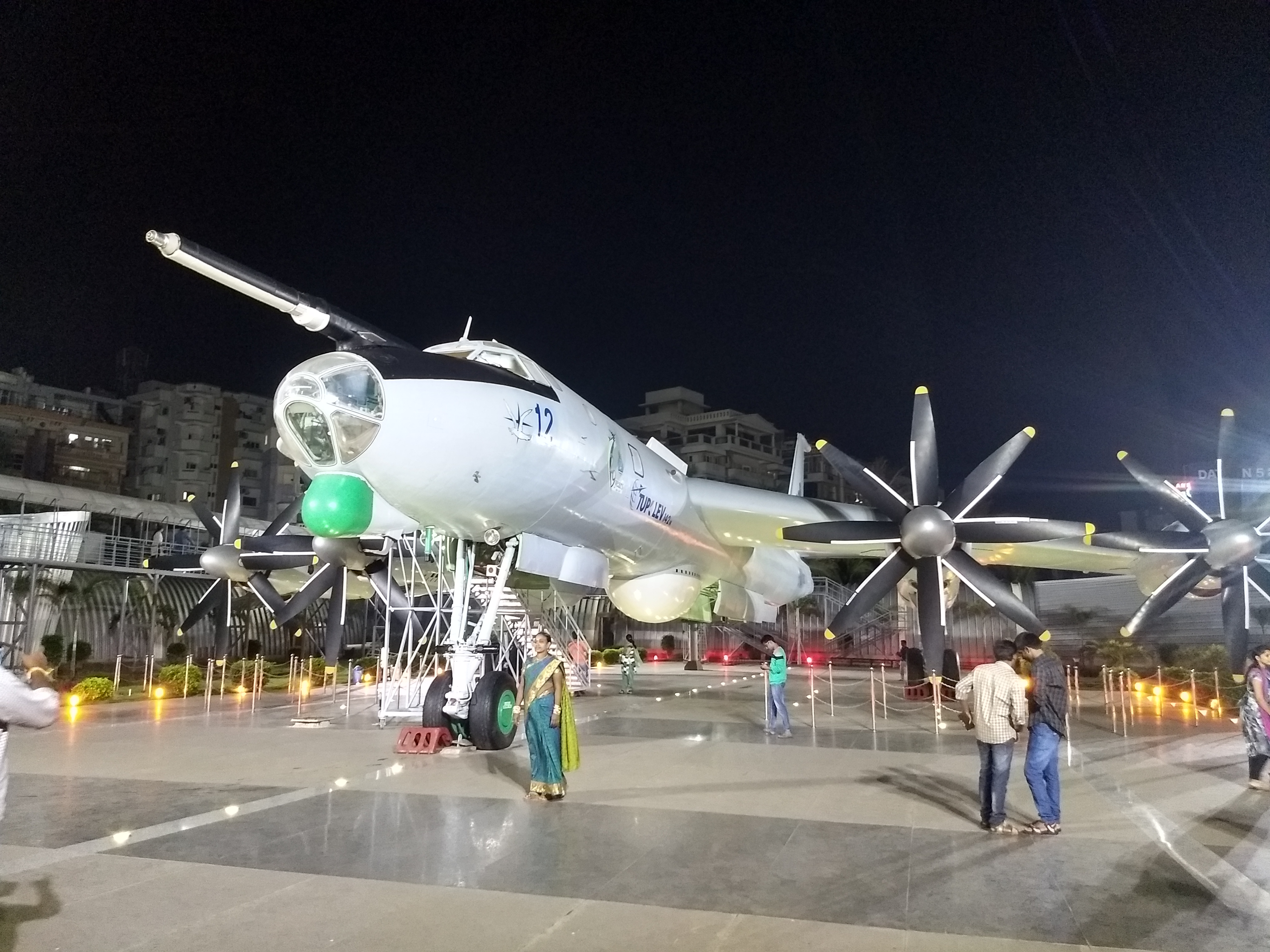
- Established: 8 December 2017
- Location: Pandurangapuram, Visakhapatnam
- Coordinates: 17.718002°N 83.329812°E
- Type: Aviation museum, Transport museum
- Owner: Visakhapatnam Metropolitan Region Development Authority

The TU 142 Aircraft Museum is a preserved Tupolev Tu-142MK-E located in Visakhapatnam, in the Indian state of Andhra Pradesh. Built as part of Vizag city tourism promotion, it was formally inaugurated by President of India Ram Nath Kovind in December 2017

== Service ==
This aircraft served 29 years with the Indian Navy and had 30,000 hours of accident-free flying by the time of its retirement on 29 March 2017 at INS Rajali, Arakkonam.

== Aircraft Museum ==
The Government of Andhra Pradesh decided to preserve the aircraft in a museum. The project development cost was around ₹ 14 crores, which was funded by Andhra Pradesh Tourism Development Corporation.
