= Jodugullapalem =

- Neighbourhood
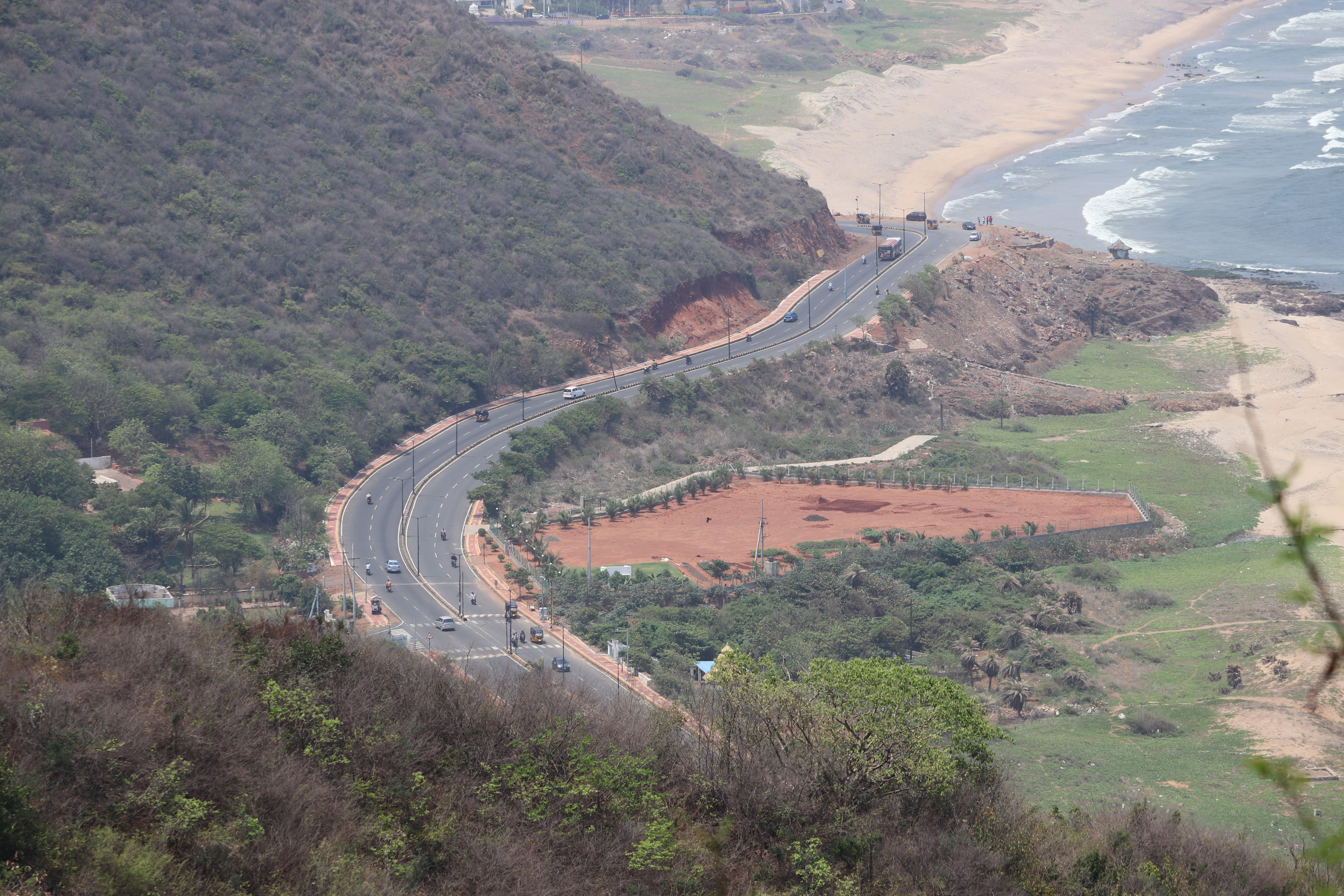
- Visakhapatnam - Bheemili Beach road near jodugullapalem

- Location in Visakhapatnam
- Coordinates: 17.752198°N 83.349217°E
- Country: India
- State: Andhra Pradesh
- District: Visakhapatnam

Government
  - Body: Greater Visakhapatnam Municipal Corporation

Languages
  - Official: Telugu
- Time zone: UTC+5:30 (IST)
- PIN: 530043
- Vehicle registration: AP 31, AP 32 and AP 33

Jodugullapalem is a neighbourhood of Visakhapatnam, India. It is situated between Sagar Nagar and Kailasagiri.

Jodugullapalem's name is derived from twin temples, and it is one of the old settlements in Visakhapatnam.
