= Scindia, Visakhapatnam =

Scindia సింధియా
- Neighbourhood
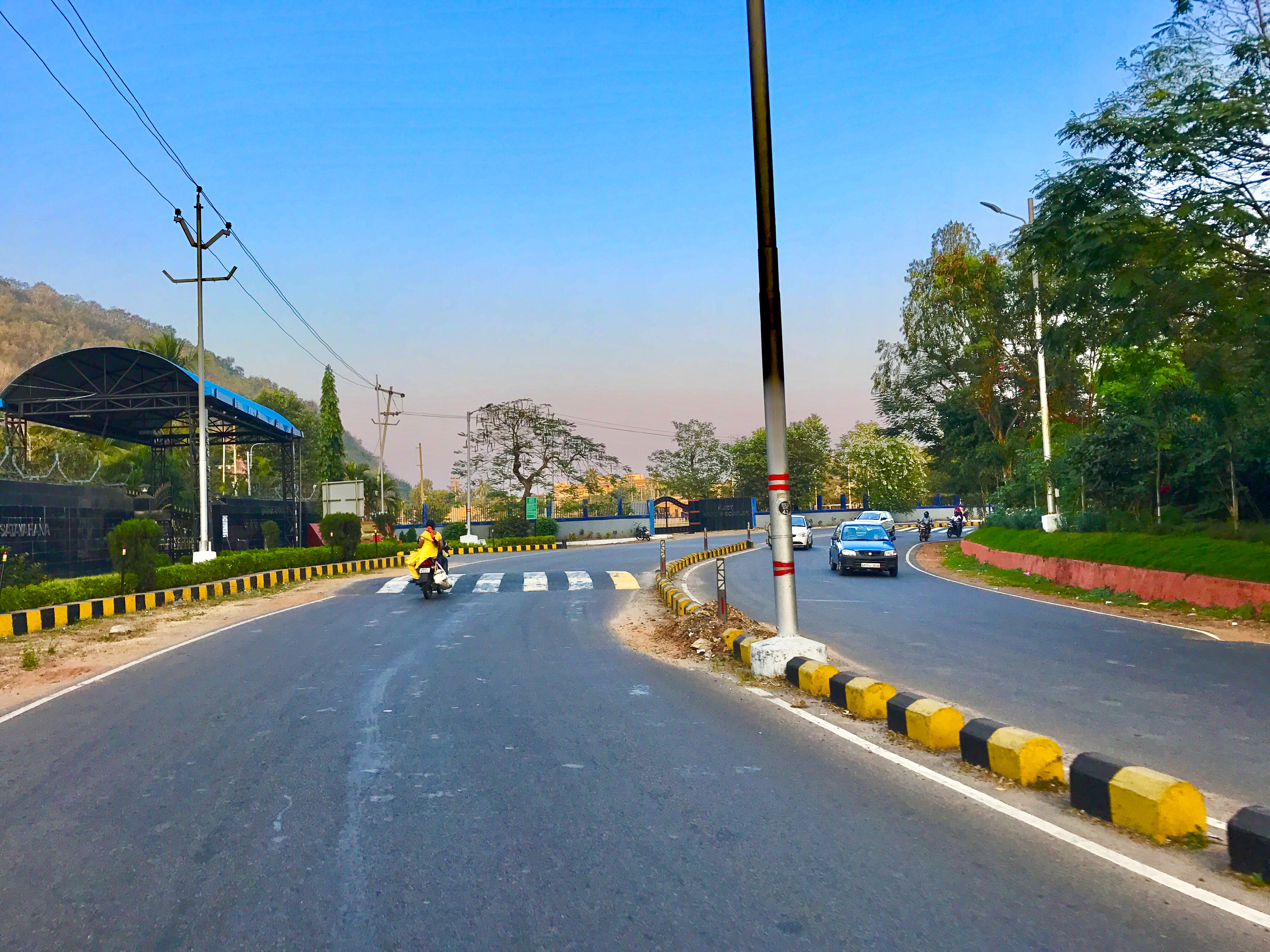
- Scindia road near HPCL

- Location in Visakhapatnam
- Coordinates: 17.688806°N 83.268494°E
- Country: India
- State: Andhra Pradesh
- District: Visakhapatnam

Government
  - Body: Greater Visakhapatnam Municipal Corporation

Languages
  - Official: Telugu
- Time zone: UTC+5:30 (IST)
- PIN: 530014
- Vehicle registration: AP-31

Scindia is an important neighborhood situated on the coastal part of Visakhapatnam City, India. The area, which falls under the local administrative limits of Greater Visakhapatnam Municipal Corporation, it is one of the main industrial area in the city.

== History ==
The name of this area came from Scindia Steam Navigation Company Ltd. which was established as shipyard in the year 1941 by Seth Walchand Hirachand. which changed the history of Visakhapatnam city industrial sector.

== Transport ==
Scindia is well connected with Gajuwaka, Gopalapatnam, Pendurthi, Kurmannapalem and Kothavalasa. 55, 55K and 600 city bus routes are running from here.

APSRTC routes

Route number	Start	End	Via
400	Gajuwaka/Kurmannapalem	RTC Complex	New Gajuwaka, Sriharipuram, Malkapuram, Scindia, Naval Dockyard, Railway Station
400K	Duvvada Railway Station	Maddilapalem	New Gajuwaka, Sriharipuram, Malkapuram, Scindia, Naval Dockyard, Railway Station, RTC Complex
400T	Steelplant	Maddilapalem	New Gajuwaka, Sriharipuram, Malkapuram, Scindia, Naval Dockyard, Railway Station, RTC Complex
400H	Gantyada HB Colony	Maddilapalem	New Gajuwaka, Sriharipuram, Malkapuram, Scindia, Naval Dockyard, Railway Station, RTC Complex
404	Steelplant Gate	PM Palem	New Gajuwaka, Sriharipuram, Malkapuram, Scindia, Naval Dockyard, Railway Station, RTC Complex, Maddilapalem, Hanumanthuwaka, Yendada
99	Gajuwaka	R.K.Beach	New Gajuwaka, Sriharipuram, Malkapuram, Scindia, Naval Dockyard, Town Kotharoad, Jagadamba,
600	Anakapalle	Scindia	Lankelapalem, Kurmannapalem, Old Gajuwaka, New Gajuwaka, Malkapuram
55	Scindia	Simhachalam	Malkapuram, New Gajuwaka, Old Gajuwaka, BHPV, Airport, NAD Kotharoad, Gopalapatnam
55K	Scindia	Kothavalasa	Malkapuram, New Gajuwaka, Old Gajuwaka, BHPV, Airport, NAD Kotharoad, Gopalapatnam, Vepagunta, Pendurthi
16	Yarada	Poorna Market	Naval Base, Scindia, Naval Dockyard, Convent Junction
311	Scindia	Chodavaram	Malkapuram, New Gajuwaka, Old Gajuwaka, Duvvada railway station, Sabbavaram, Venkannapalem
