= Pandurangapuram, Visakhapatnam =

Pandurangapuram పాండురంగాపురం
- Neighbourhood
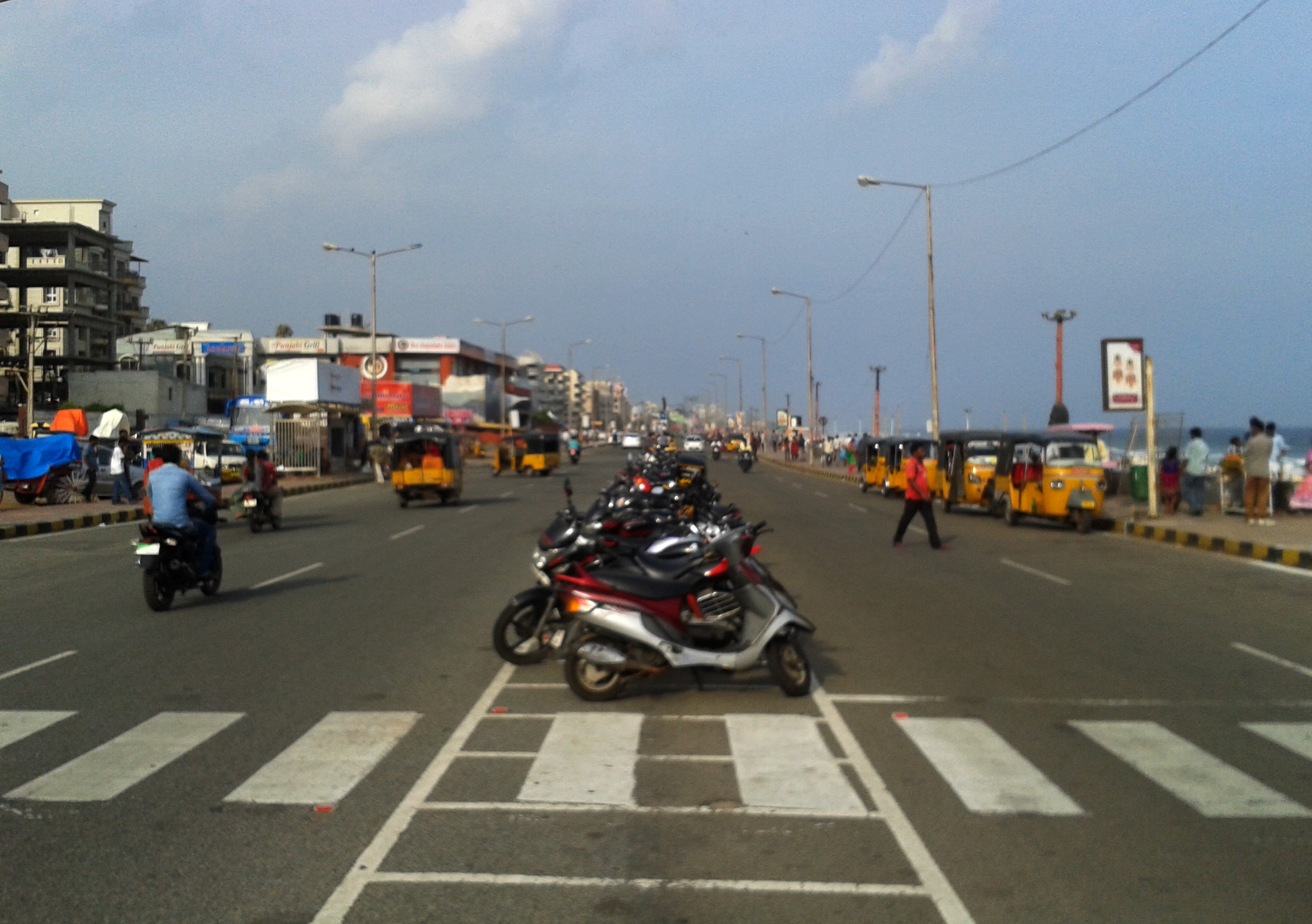
- Beach road at Pandurangapuram

- Location in Visakhapatnam
- Coordinates: 17.715738°N 83.322434°E
- Country: India
- State: Andhra Pradesh
- District: Visakhapatnam

Government
  - Body: Greater Visakhapatnam Municipal Corporation

Languages
  - Official: Telugu
- Time zone: UTC+5:30 (IST)
- PIN: 530003
- Vehicle registration: AP-31

Pandurangapuram is a neighborhood situated on the coastal part of Visakhapatnam City, India. The area, which falls under the local administrative limits of Greater Visakhapatnam Municipal Corporation, is about 4 km from the Dwaraka Nagar which is city centre. Pandurangapuram is located at the besides of Bay of Bengal and its totally surrounded by Maharanipeta, Kirlampudi Layout and Daspalla Hills.

== Overview ==
This area is one of the more affluent residential areas in city.

== Transport ==
APSRTC routes

Route number	Start	End	Via
210	Ravindra Nagar	Gantyada HB Colony	Hanumanthuwaka, Appughar, MVP Colony, Pedawaltair, Siripuram, RK Beach, Jagadamba Centre, Town Kotharoad, Convent, Scindia, Malkapuram, New Gajuwaka, Pedagantyada
