= Narasimha Nagar =

- Neighbourhood
- Location in Visakhapatnam
- Coordinates: 17.738561°N 83.295845°E
- Country: India
- State: Andhra Pradesh
- District: Visakhapatnam

Government
  - Body: Greater Visakhapatnam Municipal Corporation

Languages
  - Official: Telugu
- Time zone: UTC+5:30 (IST)
- PIN: 530024
- Vehicle registration: AP-31,32

Narasimha Nagar is a neighbourhood of Visakhapatnam City, India. It borders the Simhachalam hill range and Akkayyapalem. It falls under the local administrative limits of the Greater Visakhapatnam Municipal Corporation.
