= Thimmapuram, Visakhapatnam =

Thimmapuram తిమ్మాపురం విశాఖపట్నం
- Neighbourhood
- Location in Visakhapatnam
- Coordinates: 17.811001°N 83.404997°E
- Country: India
- State: Andhra Pradesh
- District: Visakhapatnam
- Elevation: 11 m (36 ft)

Population (2011)
  - Total: 6,057

Languages
  - Official: Telugu
- Time zone: UTC+5:30 (IST)
- PIN: 530048
- Vehicle registration: AP-31

Thimmapuram is a suburb in the city of Visakhapatnam, state of Andhra Pradesh, India. It's in the northern part of the city.

== About ==
Thimmapuram is between Kapuluppada and Rushikonda. In recent times this area is developing rapidly because it's in the beach corridor and the area is developing as an educational and hospitality hub.
