= Jalari Peta =

- Neighbourhood
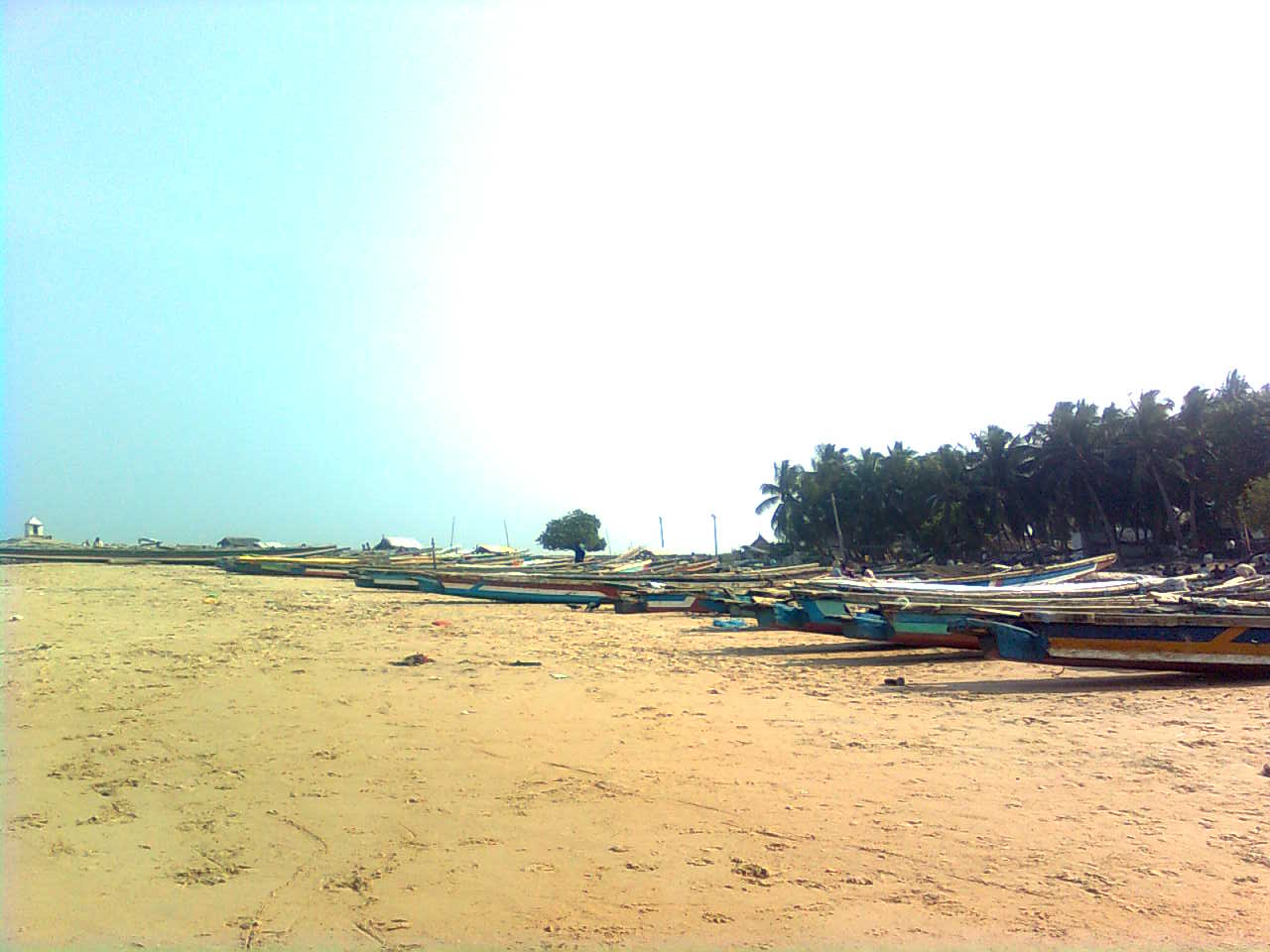
- Fishing boats at jalaripeta

- Location in Visakhapatnam
- Coordinates: 17.727598°N 83.342670°E
- Country: India
- State: Andhra Pradesh
- District: Visakhapatnam

Government
  - Body: Greater Visakhapatnam Municipal Corporation

Languages
  - Official: Telugu
- Time zone: UTC+5:30 (IST)
- PIN: 530017
- Vehicle registration: AP-31

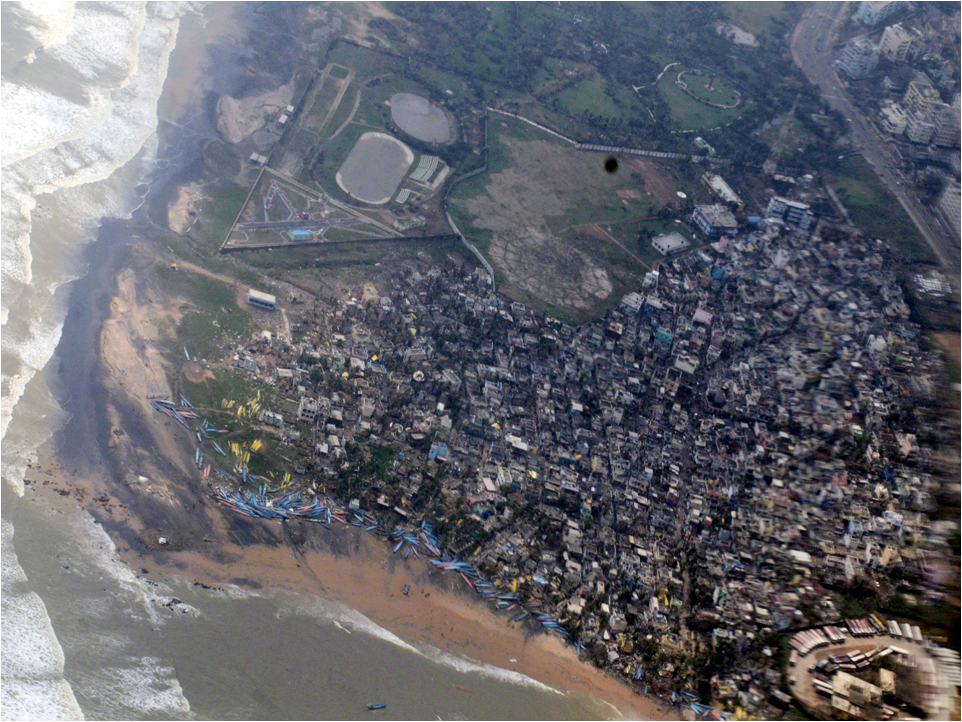
Aerial view of Jalari Peta in the aftermath of Cyclone Hudhud.

Peda Jalari Peta or Jalaripeta is a popular residential area in the city of Visakhapatnam. People residing here are majorly involved in fishing and related activities. VUDA Park is beside this area.

== Transport ==
APSRTC routes

Book on the Jalari Community:

The cultural dialectics of knowledge and desire by Charles William Nuckolls

Route number	Start	End	Via
14	Venkojipalem	Old Head Post Office	Appughar, Chinnawaltair, Siripuram, Jagadamba Centre, Town Kotharoad
210	Ravindra Nagar	Gantyada HB Colony	Hanumanthuwaka, Appughar, MVP Colony, Pedawaltair, Siripuram, RK Beach, Jagadamba Centre, Town Kotharoad, Convent, Scindia, Malkapuram, New Gajuwaka, Pedagantyada
