= Salipeta =

- Neighbourhood
- Location in Visakhapatnam
- Coordinates: 17.707859°N 83.300555°E
- Country: India
- State: Andhra Pradesh
- District: Visakhapatnam

Government
  - Body: Greater Visakhapatnam Municipal Corporation

Languages
  - Official: Telugu
- Time zone: UTC+5:30 (IST)
- PIN: 530001
- Vehicle registration: AP 31, AP 32 and AP 33

Salipeta is a neighbourhood of Visakhapatnam, India.

The locality Salipeta falls under the Greater Visakhapatnam Municipal Corporation, and it is one of the oldest localities in One Town (Visakhapatnam).
