= Santhipuram, Visakhapatnam =

Santhipuram
- Neighbourhood
- Location in Visakhapatnam
- Coordinates: 17.736804°N 83.305483°E
- Country: India
- State: Andhra Pradesh
- District: Visakhapatnam

Government
  - Body: Greater Visakhapatnam Municipal Corporation

Languages
  - Official: Telugu
- Time zone: UTC+5:30 (IST)
- Vehicle registration: AP 31, AP 32 and AP 33

Santhipuram is a locality in Visakhapatnam of Andhra Pradesh, India. It is in the Central part of the city.

== About ==
This area is beside Dwaraka Nagar and it is mostly a commercial and residential area. It is well connected with all the major parts of the city.
