= BHPV Township =

BHPV
- Neighbourhood
- Location in Visakhapatnam
- Coordinates: 17.703251°N 83.200258°E
- Country: India
- State: Andhra Pradesh
- District: Visakhapatnam

Languages
  - Official: Telugu
- Time zone: UTC+5:30 (IST)
- PIN: 530012

BHPV is a neighbourhood situated on Visakhapatnam. Its full form is Bharat Heavy Plate & Vessels Ltd township. It was established in the 1960s for BHPV employees.

== About ==
BHPV is a planned township, with school, ATMs, banks and super markets.
