= Isukathota =

- Neighbourhood
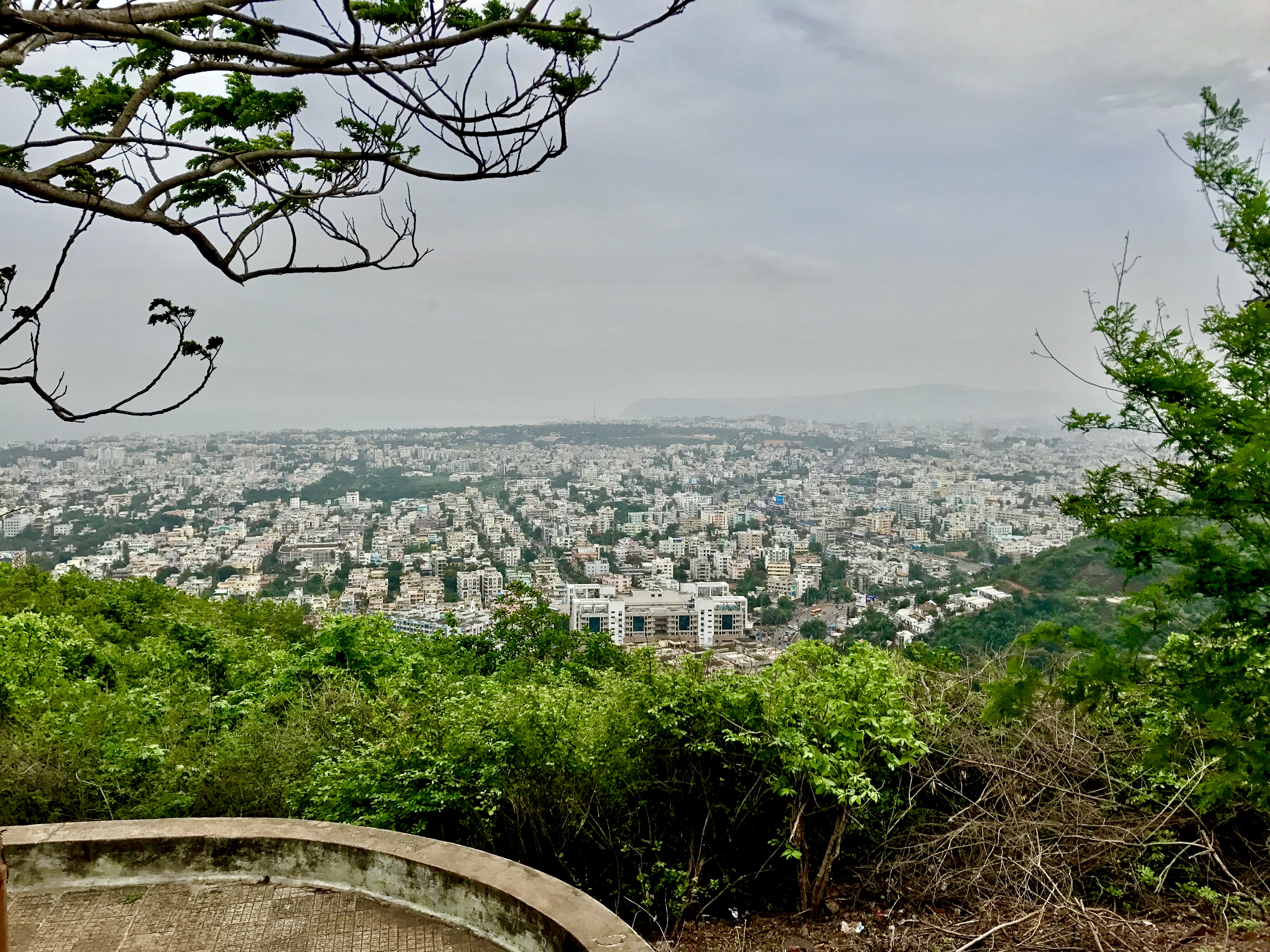
- A view of Isukthota from Kailasagiri

- Location in Visakhapatnam
- Coordinates: 17.740442°N 83.326749°E
- Country: India
- State: Andhra Pradesh
- District: Visakhapatnam

Government
  - Body: Greater Visakhapatnam Municipal Corporation

Languages
  - Official: Telugu
- Time zone: UTC+5:30 (IST)
- PIN: 530022
- Vehicle registration: AP 31, AP 32 and AP 33

Isukathota is a locality in the Maddilapalem neighbourhood of Visakhapatnam, India. It is situated between Sivajipalem and Venkojipalem.

Isukathota contains many large residential complexes. Isukathota has the scope for very high development as it is surrounded by major areas like MVP Colony, Venkojipalem, Sivajipalem and Seethammadhara. The basic infrastructure like the roads, sewage and drinking water are better comparative to most other parts of the Visakhapatnam City. Greater Visakhapatnam Municipal Corporation has taken over the Isukathota area and bringing in the amenities needed like road, sewage and drinking water.

It is well connected by APSRTC buses, all over the city.

There are lot of shops for shopping like Supermarkets, and shops are located here.
