= Gidijala =

- Neighbourhood
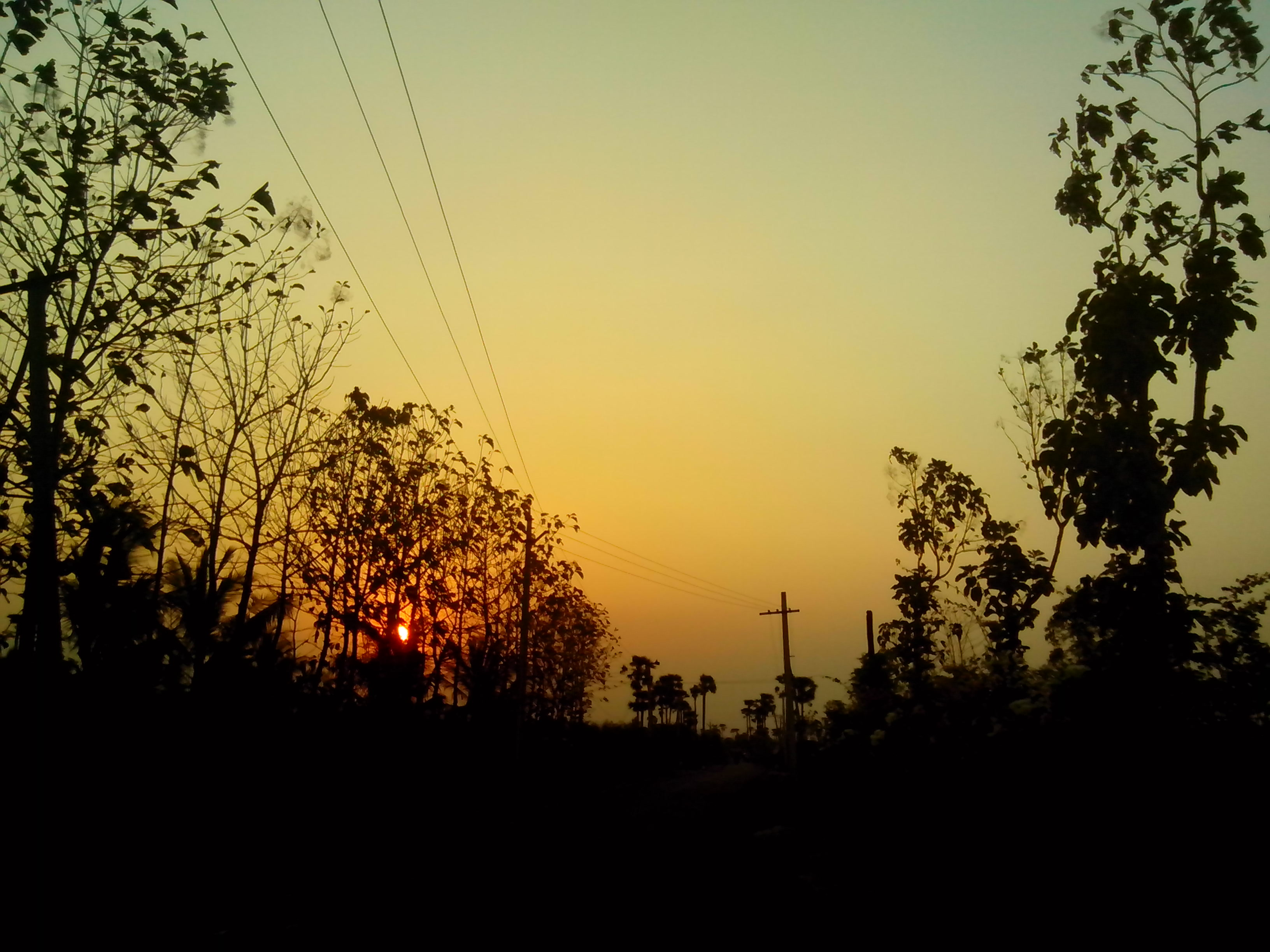
- Sunset near Gidijala

- Location in Visakhapatnam
- Coordinates: 17.89°N 83.29°E
- Country: India
- State: Andhra Pradesh
- District: Visakhapatanam

Government
  - Type: panchayat
  - Body: Gram panchayat

Population (2001)
  - Total: 3,670

Languages
  - Official: Telugu
- Time zone: UTC+5:30 (IST)
- PIN: 531173
- Vehicle registration: ap 31

Gidijala is a neighbourhood in Anandapuram Mandal, Visakhapatanam District of Andhra Pradesh, India.

== Transport ==
APSRTC routes

Route number	Start	End	Via
700	Vizianagaram	Simhachalam	Padbanabham, Boni, Gidijala, Shontyam, SR Puram, Adavivaram
28A/G	Gidijala	RK Beach	Shontyam, Pendurthi, Vepagunta, Gopalapatnam, NAD Kotharoad, Kancharapalem, RTC Complex, Jagadamba Centre
222P	RTC Complex/Railway Station	Padbanabham	Maddilapalem, Hanumantuwaka, Yendada, Madhurawada, Anandapuram, Gidijala, Boni
