= Velampeta =

Velampeta వెలంపేట
- Neighbourhood
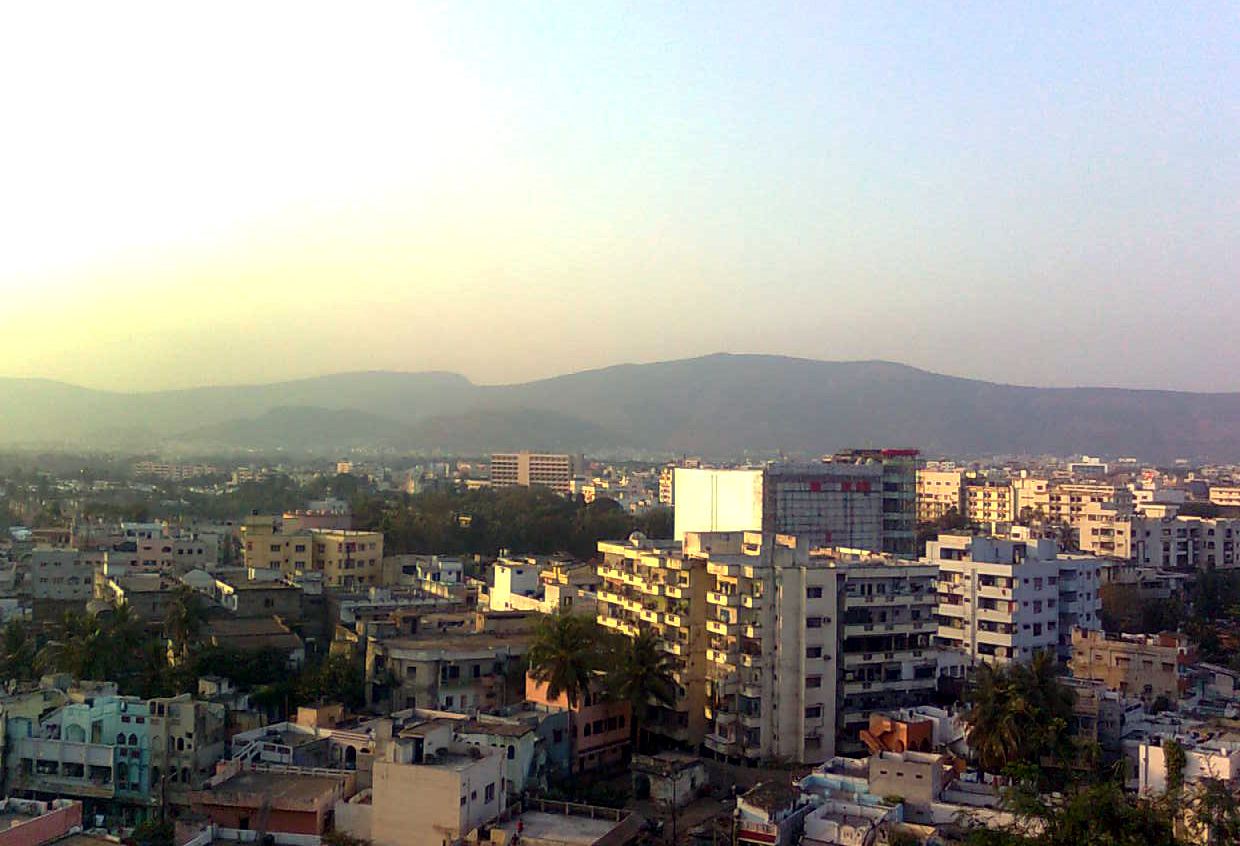

- Location in Visakhapatnam
- Coordinates: 17.704597°N 83.296238°E
- Country: India
- State: Andhra Pradesh
- District: Visakhapatnam

Government
  - Body: Greater Visakhapatnam Municipal Corporation

Languages
  - Official: Telugu
- Time zone: UTC+5:30 (IST)
- PIN: 530001
- Vehicle registration: AP-31

Velmpeta is a popular commercial area in the city of Visakhapatnam in the Indian state of Andhra Pradesh.The area, which falls under the local administrative limits of Greater Visakhapatnam Municipal Corporation, is about 4 km from the Dwaraka bus station.

Velampeta is one of the old settlements in Visakhapatnam city. In the early 1970s it was a central hub of commercial activity for the city. This district has a BSNL telephone exchange.

== Transport ==
APSRTC routes

Route number	Start	End	Via
25K	Bakkannapalem	Old Head Post Office	Madhurawada, Yendada, Hanumanthuwaka, Maddilapalem, RTC Complex, Jagadamba Centre, Town Kotharoad
25M	Marikavalasa	Old Head Post Office	Madhurawada, Yendada, Hanumanthuwaka, Maddilapalem, RTC Complex, Jagadamba Centre, Town Kotharoad
25G	Ganeshnagar	Old Head Post Office	Madhurawada, Yendada, Hanumanthuwaka, Maddilapalem, RTC Complex, Jagadamba Centre, Town Kotharoad
25S	YSR Nagar	Old Head Post Office	Madhurawada, Yendada, Hanumanthuwaka, Maddilapalem, RTC Complex, Jagadamba Centre, Town Kotharoad
25E	Kommadi	Old Head Post Office	Madhurawada, Yendada, Hanumanthuwaka, Maddilapalem, RTC Complex, Jagadamba Centre, Town Kotharoad
52D	Ravindra Nagar	Old Head Post Office	Town Kotharoad, Jagadamba Centre, RTC Complex, Maddilapalem, Hanumanthuwaka
52S	Sagarnagar	Old Head Post Office	Town Kotharoad, Jagadamba Centre, RTC Complex, Maddilapalem, Hanumanthuwaka, Visalakshinagar
52E	Peda Rushikonda	Old Head Post Office	Town Kotharoad, Jagadamba Centre, RTC Complex, Maddilapalem, Hanumanthuwaka, Yendada, Rushikonda
20A	HB Colony	Old Head Post Office	Town Kotharoad, Jagadamba Centre, RTC Complex, Gurudwar, Satyam Junction, Seethammadhara
17K	Bhimili	Old Head Post Office	Town Kotharoad, Jagadamba Centre, RTC Complex, Siripuram, Pedawaltair, Appughar, Sagarnagar, Rushikonda, Thimmapuram, INS Kalinga
60	Simhachalam	Old Head Post Office	Town Kotharoad, Jagadamba Centre, RTC Complex, Maddilapalem, Hanumanthuwaka, Arilova, Adavivaram
60C	Arilova Colony	Old Head Post Office	Town Kotharoad, Jagadamba Centre, RTC Complex, Maddilapalem, Hanumanthuwaka
6	Old Head Post Office	Simhachalam	Town Kotharoad, Convent, Kancharapalem, NAD Kotharoad, Gopalapatnam
6K	Old Head Post Office	Kothavalasa	Town Kotharoad, Convent, Kancharapalem, NAD Kotharoad, Gopalapatnam, Vepagunta, Pendurthi
12D	RTC Complex	Devarapalle	Railway New Colony, Kancharapalem, NAD Kotharoad, Gopalapatnam, Vepagunta, Pendurthi, Kothavalasa
300c	RTC Complex	Chodavaram	Railway New Colony, Kancharapalem, NAD Kotharoad, Gopalapatnam, Vepagunta, Pinagadi, Sabbavaram
333K	Town Kotharoad	K.Kotapadu	Railway New Colony, Kancharapalem, NAD Kotharoad, Gopalapatnam, Vepagunta, Pinagadi
