= Muralinagar =

- Neighbourhood
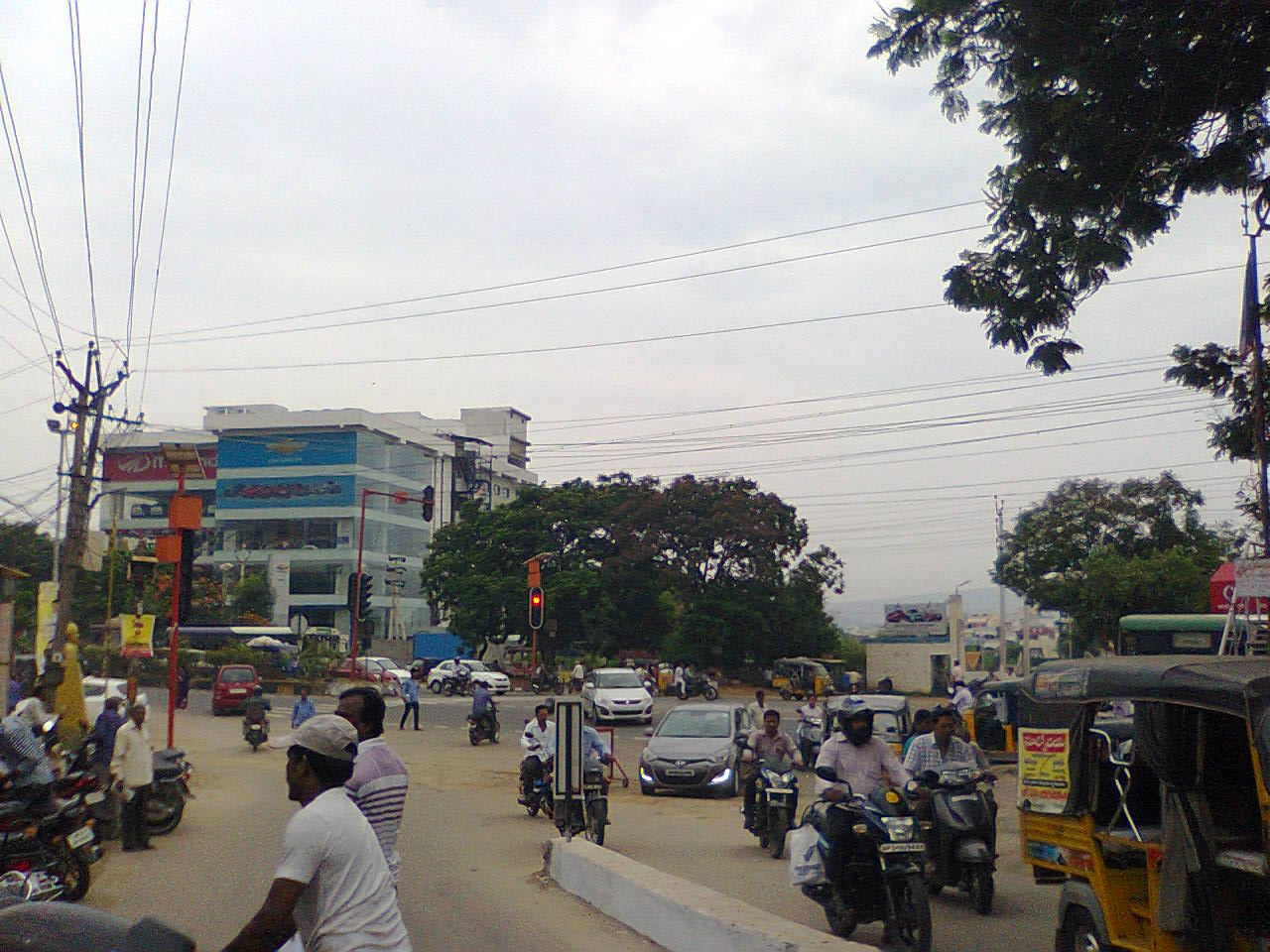
- Birla Junction at National Highway

- Location in Visakhapatnam
- Coordinates: 17.745220°N 83.261311°E
- Country: India
- State: Andhra Pradesh
- District: Visakhapatnam

Government
  - Body: Greater Visakhapatnam Municipal Corporation

Languages
  - Official: Telugu
- Time zone: UTC+5:30 (IST)
- PIN: 530007
- Vehicle registration: AP 32 and AP 33

Muralinagar is a neighbourhood of Visakhapatnam, Andhra Pradesh, India. It has a residential growth of many buildings. Passport seva kendram is situated on the national highway passes through this area called birla junction. It is a hub for automobile show rooms.

== Transport ==
This area connected with all parts of the city.
