= Soldierpet =

- Neighbourhood
- Location in Visakhapatnam
- Coordinates: 17.694074°N 83.293540°E
- Country: India
- State: Andhra Pradesh
- District: Visakhapatnam

Government
  - Body: Greater Visakhapatnam Municipal Corporation

Languages
  - Official: Telugu
- Time zone: UTC+5:30 (IST)
- PIN: 530001
- Vehicle registration: AP 31, AP 32 and AP 33

Soldierpet is one of the oldest neighbourhoods in Visakhapatnam, Andhra Pradesh, India. In the 18th century the area was a residential colony for the British Army.

== History ==
Soldierpet was formerly home to an Anglo-Indian community and resembles the backyards of Great Britain. The locality has several educational institutions.

The city is now expanding northward and has had problems with pollution.
