= Kailasapuram, Visakhapatnam =

Kailasapuram
- Neighbourhood
- Location in Visakhapatnam
- Coordinates: 17.741728°N 83.297345°E
- Country: India
- State: Andhra Pradesh
- District: Visakhapatnam

Government
  - Body: Greater Visakhapatnam Municipal Corporation

Languages
  - Official: Telugu
- Time zone: UTC+5:30 (IST)
- PIN: 530024
- Vehicle registration: AP-31,32,33,39

Kailasapuram is a residential area of the city of Visakhapatnam state of Andhra Pradesh, India.

== About ==
Visakhapatnam Port was settled in the early 1990s. Employees have resided here from that period to the present day. Some consider it one of the best residential areas in the city.

== Transport ==
APSRTC buses are 48,48A available from old city.

APSRTC routes

Route number	Start	End	Via
48	Madhavadhara	MN Club	Muralinagar, Kailasapuram, Akkayyapalem, RTC Complex, Jagadamba Centre, Town Kotharoad
48A	Madhavadhara	Old Head Post Office	Muralinagar, Kailasapuram, Akkayyapalem, RTC Complex, Dabagardens, Town Kotharoad
