= Pedamadaka =

- Neighbourhood
- Location in Visakhapatnam
- Coordinates: 17.641847°N 83.113512°E
- Country: India
- State: Andhra Pradesh
- District: Anakapalli

Languages
  - Official: Telugu
- Time zone: UTC+5:30 (IST)
- PIN: 530053
- Vehicle registration: AP-31

Pedamadaka is a neighbourhood in the city of Visakhapatnam, state of Andhra Pradesh, India.

Administratively, it is in Parawada mandal, Anakapalli district.
