= Prakashraopeta =

- Neighbourhood
- Location in Visakhapatnam
- Coordinates: 17.716895°N 83.303593°E
- Country: India
- State: Andhra Pradesh
- District: Visakhapatnam
- Founder: Government of Andhra Pradesh

Government
  - Type: Mayor-council
  - Body: GVMC

Languages
  - Official: Telugu
- Time zone: UTC+5:30 (IST)
- PIN: 530020
- Lok Sabha constituency: Visakhapatnam

Prakashraopeta is a neighborhood in the city of Visakhapatnam, India. It is one of the important neighborhood in Visakhapatnam city. It is under the administration of Greater Visakhapatnam Municipal Corporation and have so many commercial shops including District Court of Visakhapatnam.
