= Sabbavaram =

Village in Andhra Pradesh, India

- Village
- Location in Andhra Pradesh, India Sabbavaram (India)
- Coordinates: 17°47′25″N 83°07′28″E
- Country: India
- State: Andhra Pradesh
- District: Anakapalli
- Elevation: 27 m (89 ft)

Languages
  - Official: Telugu
- Time zone: UTC+5:30 (IST)
- PIN: 531035
- Vehicle registration: AP

Sabbavaram (Telugu: సబ్బవరం) is a village and headquarters of Sabbavaram mandal in Anakapalli district in the state of Andhra Pradesh in India.
