= Ravada =

Village in Andhra Pradesh, India

- Suburb
- Location in Andhra Pradesh
- Coordinates: 17.574354°N 83.054680°E
- Country: India
- State: Andhra Pradesh
- District: Anakapalli

Languages
  - Official: Telugu
- Time zone: UTC+5:30 (IST)
- PIN: 531020
- Vehicle registration: AP-31,32

Ravada is a village in Paravada mandal, Anakapalli district. It is also a suburb of Visakhapatnam City, India. The area, which falls within the local administrative limits of Panchayati, is quite close to the Simhadri Super Thermal Power Station site. Ravada is a well connected with Paravada, and Atchutapuram.
