= Seethammapeta =

Seethammpeta
- Neighbourhood
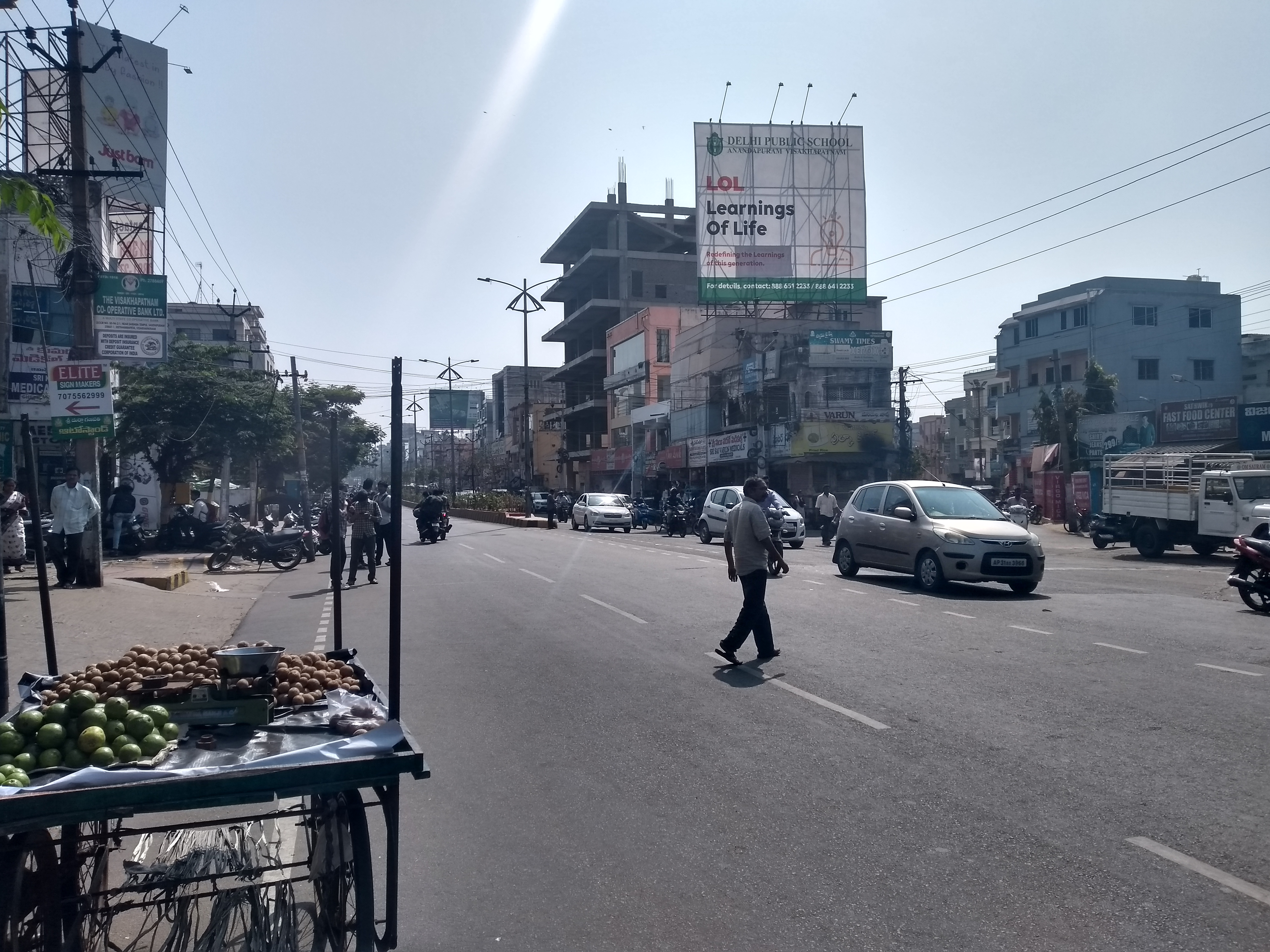
- Seethammpeta Road

- Location in Visakhapatnam
- Coordinates: 17.732700°N 83.309167°E
- Country: India
- State: Andhra Pradesh
- District: Visakhapatnam

Government
  - Body: Greater Visakhapatnam Municipal Corporation

Languages
  - Official: Telugu
- Time zone: UTC+5:30 (IST)
- PIN: 530016
- Vehicle registration: AP 31, AP 32 and AP 33

Seethammpeta is an urban neighborhood in the Indian city of Visakhapatnam. It is one of the middle-income areas of the city. Seethampeta is famous for Dasara and vinyaka chaviti festivals in city.

== Transport ==
Seethammpeta is well connected with all parts in the city because its very near to Dwaraka Bus station as Seethammpeta road connects it to NH16 which is used by all the APSRTC buses.

Akkayyapalem is well connected to Gajuwaka, NAD X Road, Maddilapalem and Pendurthi. APSRTC has buses with route numbers 48, 48A, 38 through the area's bus stop. Local auto rickshaws are also available.
