= Vellanki, Visakhapatnam =

Vellanki
- Neighbourhood
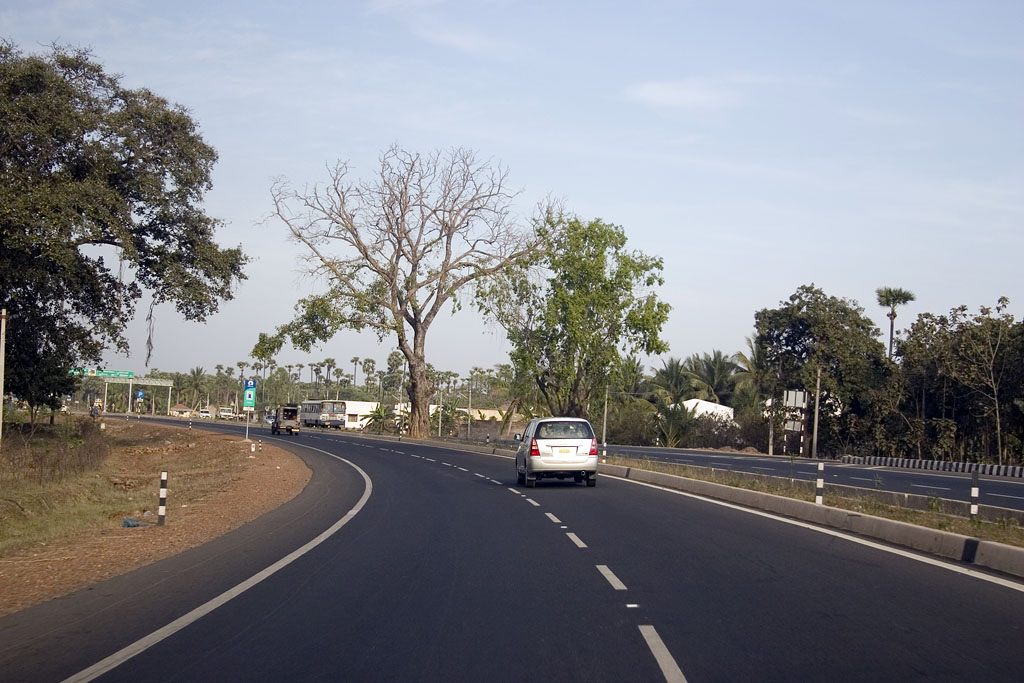
- National Highway near Vellanki

- Location in Visakhapatnam
- Coordinates: 17.881691°N 83.391384°E
- Country: India
- State: Andhra Pradesh
- District: Visakhapatnam

Government
  - Body: Visakhapatnam Metropolitan Region Development Authority

Languages
  - Official: Telugu
- Time zone: UTC+5:30 (IST)
- PIN: 531163

Vellanki is a suburb of the city of Visakhapatnam state of Andhra Pradesh, India. It is in Anandapuram Mandal.

== about ==
Vellanki is 2 km (1.2 mi) from Anandapuram and is well connected with national highway. recently this area is changing from village to urban and presently so many international schools are situated here.
