= Desapatrunipalem =

- Suburb
- Location in Visakhapatnam
- Coordinates: 17.638844°N 83.124271°E
- Country: India
- State: Andhra Pradesh
- District: Anakapalli

Government
  - Body: Greater Visakhapatnam Municipal Corporation

Languages
  - Official: Telugu
- Time zone: UTC+5:30 (IST)
- PIN: 531021
- Vehicle registration: AP-31,32

Desapatrunipalem is a suburb situated in Visakhapatnam City, India. The area, which falls within the local administrative limits of Greater Visakhapatnam Municipal Corporation, is quite close to the Visakhapatnam Steel Plant site. Desapatrunipalem is a pleasant residential colony, well connected with Gajuwaka, and has experienced a real estate boom.
