= Relli Veedhi =

Relli Veedhi రెల్లి వీధి
- Neighborhood
- Location in Visakhapatnam
- Coordinates: 17.703684°N 83.300163°E
- Country: India
- State: Andhra Pradesh
- District: Visakhapatnam

Government
  - Body: Greater Visakhapatnam Municipal Corporation

Languages
  - Official: Telugu
- Time zone: UTC+5:30 (IST)
- PIN: 530002
- Vehicle registration: AP-31

Relli Veedhi is a neighborhood situated on the central part of Visakhapatnam City, India. The area, which falls under the local administrative limits of Greater Visakhapatnam Municipal Corporation, is about 4 km from the Dwaraka Nagar which is city centre. Relli veedhi is located very near to Jagadamba Centre which is primary shopping area to city and this area popularly known for smuggled goods in the city. and Relli Veedhi comes under 23 Ward in Greater Visakhapatnam Municipal Corporation.
