= CBM Compound =

CBM Compound సీబమ్ కాంపౌండ్
- Neighbourhood
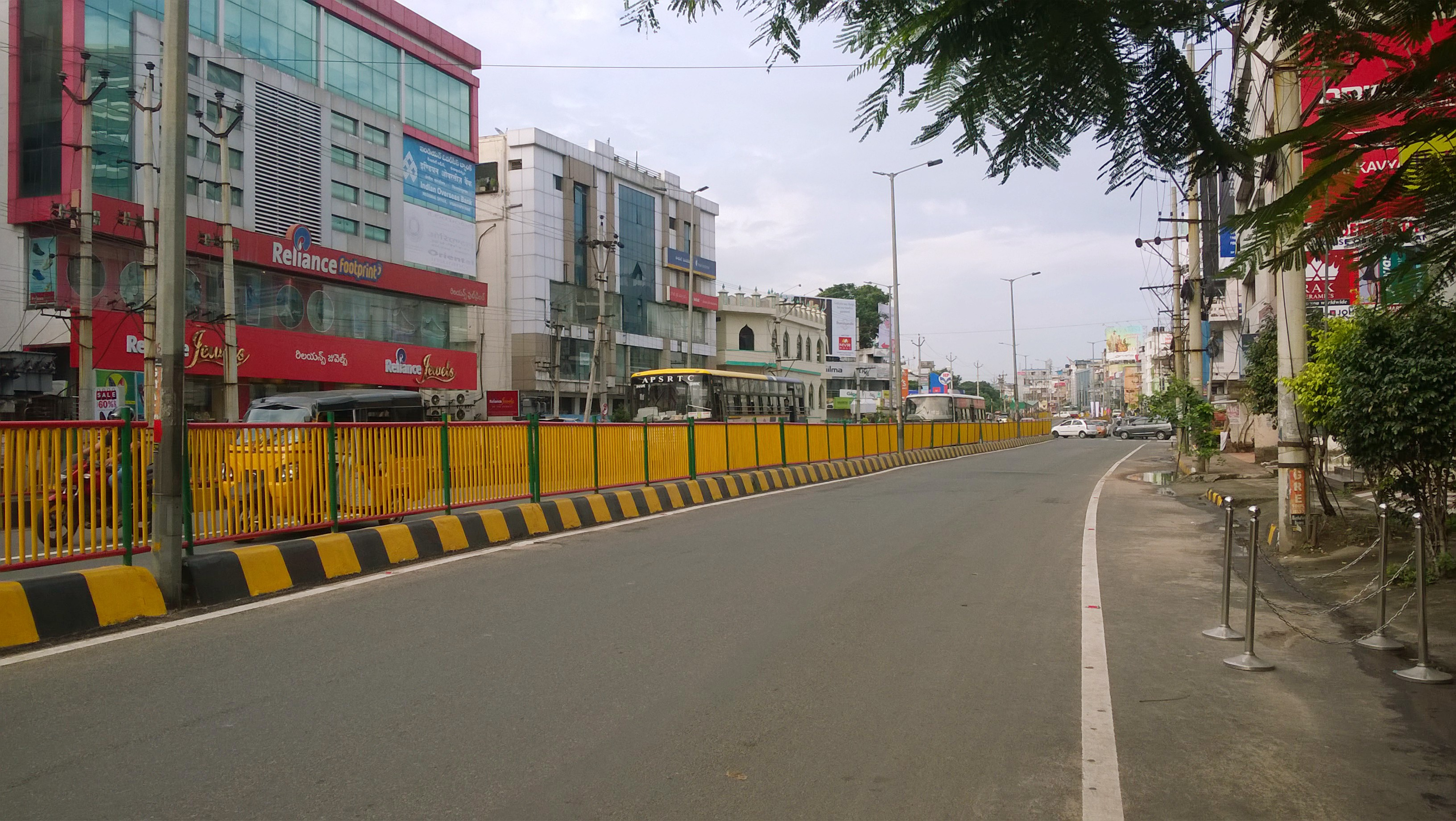
- Rama talkies road at CBM compound

- Location Visakhapatnam
- Coordinates: 17.726647°N 83.312948°E
- Country: India
- State: Andhra Pradesh
- District: Visakhapatnam

Government
  - Body: Greater Visakhapatnam Municipal Corporation

Languages
  - Official: Telugu
- Time zone: UTC+5:30 (IST)
- PIN: 530003
- Vehicle registration: AP-40

The CBM Compound, also called the Canadian Baptist Mission Compound (CBM), is a neighborhood situated in the central part of Visakhapatnam City, India. The area, which falls under the local administrative limits of Greater Visakhapatnam Municipal Corporation, is one of the up-market localities. It is a commercial center of the old residential area in the Visakhapatnam City.

CBM Compound is located between Asilmetta and Dwaraka Nagar and this area is served by the Visakhapatnam Bus Rapid Transit System. The CBM Compound area has many shopping malls, restaurants and prestigious schools like Timpany School which was established in 1931. In this area, properties are very expensive.
