= Sontyam =

Sontyam (శొంఠ్యాం)
- Neighbourhood
- Location in Visakhapatnam
- Coordinates: 17.867198°N 83.298126°E
- Country: India
- State: Andhra Pradesh
- District: Visakhapatnam

Languages
  - Official: Telugu
- Time zone: UTC+5:30 (IST)
- PIN: 530059
- Vehicle registration: AP-31

Sontyam is a neighbourhood in the city of Visakhapatnam, state of Andhra Pradesh, India. It is a suburb of the city.

== About ==
It is on the North side of city and it is famous for chicken which is called for Sontyam Chicken.

== Transport ==
Sontyam is well connected with Madhurawada, Maddilapalem.

APSRTC routes

Route number	Start	End	Via
700	Vizianagaram	Simhachalam	Padbanabham, Boni, Gidijala, Shontyam, SR Puram, Adavivaram
28A/G	Gidijala	RK Beach	Shontyam, Pendurthi, Vepagunta, Gopalapatnam, NAD Kotharoad, Kancharapalem, RTC Complex, Jagadamba Centre
222P	RTC Complex/Railway Station	Padbanabham	Maddilapalem, Hanumantuwaka, Yendada, Madhurawada, Anandapuram, Gidijala, Boni
888	Anakapalle	Tagarapuvalasa	Sankaram, Sabbavaram, Pendurthi, Sontyam, Anandapuram
55T	Tagarapuvalasa/Chittivalasa Jn.	Scindia	Anandapuram, Gudilova, Shontyam, Pendurthi, Vepagunta, Gopalapatnam, NAD Kotharoad, Airport, BHPV, Gajuwaka, Malkapuram
