= Lankelapalem =

Lankelapalem లంకెలపాలెం
- Neighbourhood
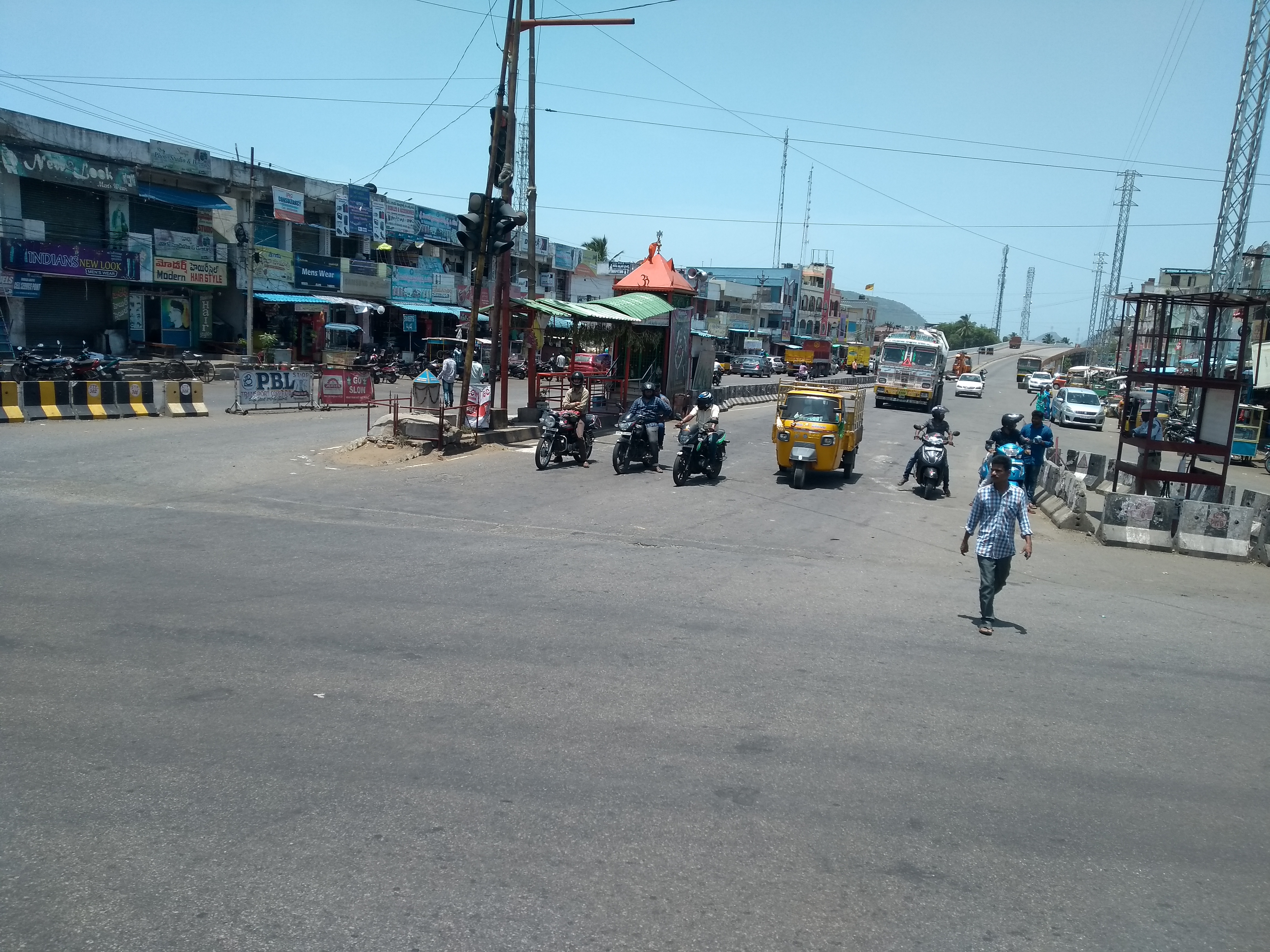
- Road junction at Lankelapalem

- Location in Visakhapatnam
- Coordinates: 17.660405°N 83.086088°E
- Country: India
- State: Andhra Pradesh
- District: Anakapalli

Government
  - Body: Greater Visakhapatnam Municipal Corporation

Languages
  - Official: Telugu
- Time zone: UTC+5:30 (IST)
- PIN: 531019
- Vehicle registration: AP-31

Lankelapalem is a neighbourhood in the city of Visakhapatnam, state of Andhra Pradesh, India. It is a suburb of the city.

== About ==
It is on the south side of the city with many small scale industries situated here including pharma city, employing many locals, and it is one of the transport hubs.

== Transport ==
Lankelapalem is well connected with Gajuwaka, NAD X Road, Malkapuram and Dwaraka Nagar.

APSRTC routes

Route number	Start	End	Via
500	Anakapalle	RTC Complex	Lankelapalem, Kurmannaplem, Old Gajuwaka, BHPV, Airport, NAD Kotharoad, Birla Junction, Gurudwar
500Y	Yalamanchili	RTC Complex	Anakapalle, Lankelapalem, Kurmannaplem, Old Gajuwaka, BHPV, Airport, NAD Kotharoad, Birla Junction, Gurudwar
500A	Achutapuram	RTC Complex	Anakapalle, Lankelapalem, Kurmannaplem, Old Gajuwaka, BHPV, Airport, NAD Kotharoad, Birla Junction, Gurudwar
777	Achutapuram	RTC Complex	Anakapalle, Lankelapalem, Kurmannaplem, Old Gajuwaka, BHPV, Airport, NAD Kotharoad, Birla Junction, Gurudwar
99A/C	Chodavaram	RK Beach	Anakapalle, Lankelapalem, Kurmannaplem, Old Gajuwaka, New Gajuwaka, Malkapuram, Scindia, Town Kotharoad, Jagadamba
400N	Vada Chipurupalle	Maddilapalem	Parawada, Lankelapalem, Kurmannaplem, Old Gajuwaka, New Gajuwaka, Malkapuram, Scindia, Railway Station, RTC Complex
64A	Swayambhuvaram	Collector Office	Lankelapalem, Kurmannaplem, Old Gajuwaka, New Gajuwaka, Malkapuram, Scindia, Town Kotharoad, Jagadamba
77	Thanam	Collector Office	Lankelapalem, Kurmannaplem, Old Gajuwaka, New Gajuwaka, Malkapuram, Scindia, Town Kotharoad, Jagadamba
77T	Thadi	Collector Office	Lankelapalem, Kurmannaplem, Old Gajuwaka, New Gajuwaka, Malkapuram, Scindia, Town Kotharoad, Jagadamba

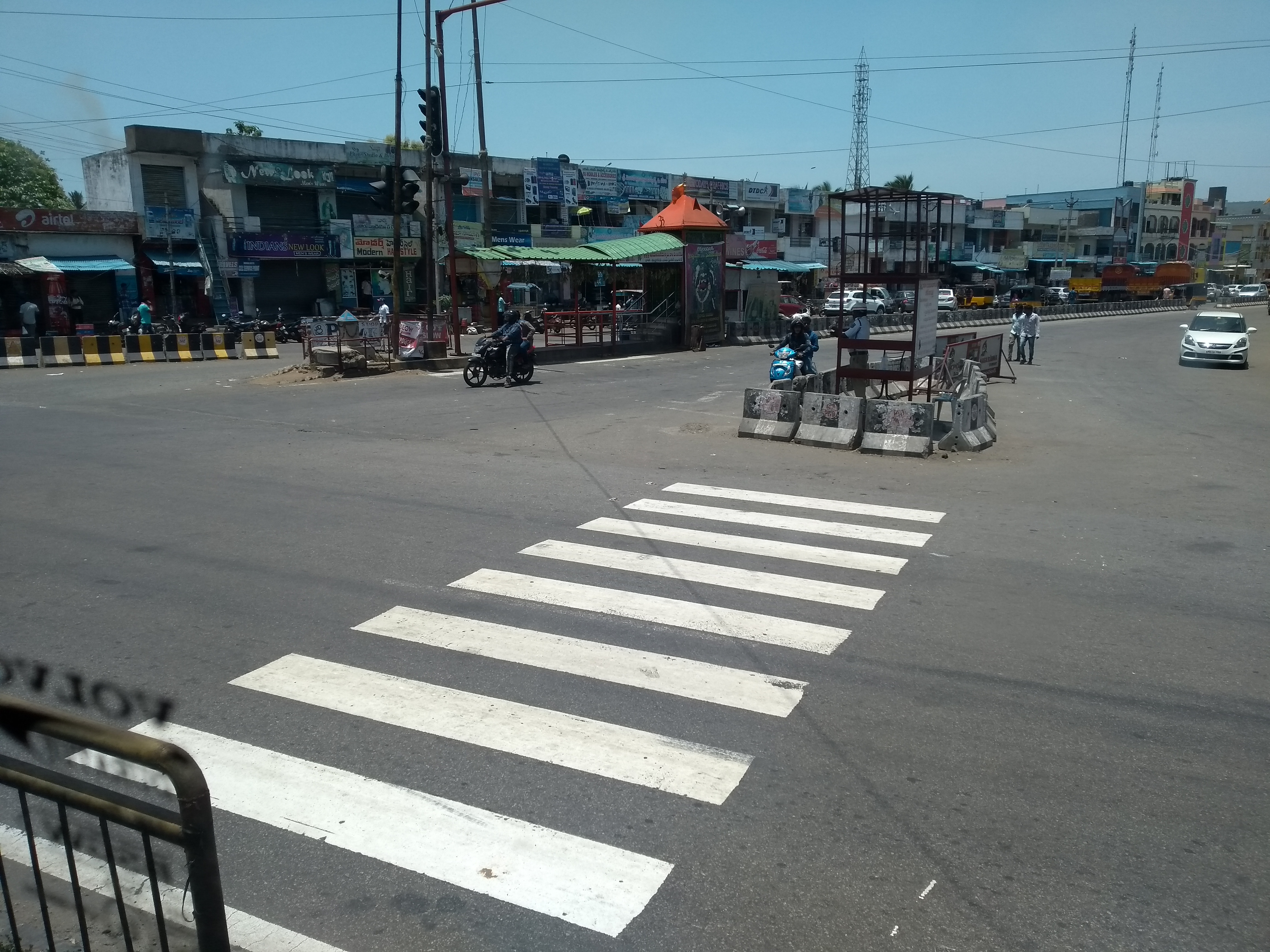
NH Road at Lankelapalem
