= Kakani Nagar =

- Neighbourhood
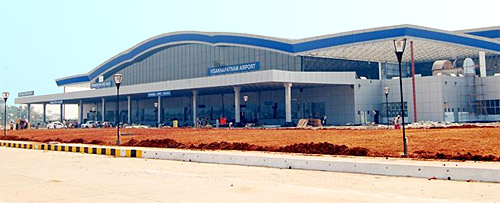
- Former Civil terminal, INS Dega

- Location in Visakhapatnam
- Coordinates: 17.739739°N 83.227117°E
- Country: India
- State: Andhra Pradesh
- District: Visakhapatnam

Government
  - Body: Greater Visakhapatnam Municipal Corporation

Languages
  - Official: Telugu
- Time zone: UTC+5:30 (IST)
- PIN: 530009
- Vehicle registration: AP-31,32

Kakani Nagar is a neighborhood situated on the Visakhapatnam City, India. The area, which falls under the local administrative limits of Greater Visakhapatnam Municipal Corporation, is about 3 km from the INS Dega. Kakani Nagar is a well residential colony its well connected with Gajuwaka and Maddilapalem

== Transport ==
APSRTC routes:

Route number	Start	End	Via
38	Gajuwaka	RTC Complex	BHPV, Airport, NAD Kotharoad, Birla Junction, Gurudwar
38K	Kurmannapalem	RTC Complex	Old Gajuwaka, BHPV, Airport, NAD Kotharoad, Birla Junction, Gurudwar
38H	Gantyada HB Colony	RTC Complex	Pedagantyada, New Gajuwaka, Old Gajuwaka, BHPV, Airport, NAD Kotharoad, Birla Junction, Gurudwar
38T	Steel Plant	RTC Complex	Kurmannapalem, Old Gajuwaka, BHPV, Airport, NAD Kotharoad, Birla Junction, Gurudwar
38D	Nadupuru	RTC Complex	Pedagantyada, New Gajuwaka, Old Gajuwaka, BHPV, Airport, NAD Kotharoad, Birla Junction, Gurudwar
38J	Janata Colony	RTC Complex	Sriharipuram, New Gajuwaka, Old Gajuwaka, BHPV, Airport, NAD Kotharoad, Birla Junction, Gurudwar
38Y	Duvvada Railway Station	RTC Complex	Kurmannaplem, Old Gajuwaka, BHPV, Airport, NAD Kotharoad, Birla Junction, Gurudwar
55	Scindia	Simhachalam	Malkapuram, New Gajuwaka, Old Gajuwaka, BHPV, Airport, NAD Kotharoad, Gopalapatnam
55K	Scindia	Kothavalasa	Malkapuram, New Gajuwaka, Old Gajuwaka, BHPV, Airport, NAD Kotharoad, Gopalapatnam, Vepagunta, Pendurthi
