= Naidu Thota =

Naidu Thota నాయుడు తోట
- Neighbourhood
- Location in Visakhapatnam
- Coordinates: 17.763476°N 83.212255°E
- Country: India
- State: Andhra Pradesh
- District: Visakhapatnam

Government
  - Body: Greater Visakhapatnam Municipal Corporation

Languages
  - Official: Telugu
- Time zone: UTC+5:30 (IST)
- PIN: 530029
- Vehicle registration: AP-31

Naidu Thota is a suburb of the city of Visakhapatnam state of Andhra Pradesh, India.

== About ==
It is a residential area, with a college, schools, and Shankar Foundation Eye Hospital nearby.

== Transport ==
It is well connected with Gajuwaka, NAD X Road, Malkapuram, Dwaraka Nagar and Visakhapatnam Steel Plant.

Andhra Pradesh State Road Transport Corporation routes:

| Route number | Start | End | Via |
|---|---|---|---|
| 28K/28A/12D | RK Beach | Kothavalasa/Pendurthi | Jagadamba Centre, RTC Complex, Kancharapalem, NAD Kotharoad, Gopalapatnam, Vepagunta |
| 6K | Old Head Post Office | Kothavalasa | Jagadamba Centre, RTC Complex, Kancharapalem, NAD Kotharoad, Gopalapatnam, Vepagunta, Pendurthi |
| 300C/300M | RTC Complex | Chodavaram/Madugula | Railway Newcolony, Kancharapalem, NAD Kotharoad, Gopalapatnam, Vepagunta, Sabbavaram |
| 555 | RTC Complex | Chodavaram | Gurudwara, NAD Kotharoad, Gopalapatnam, Vepagunta, Sabbavaram |
| 55K | Scindia | Kothavalasa | Malkapuram, Sriharipuram, New Gajuwaka, Old Gajuwaka, BHPV, NAD Kotharoad, Gopalapatnam, Vepagunta |
| 541 | Maddilapalem | Kothavalasa | Gurudwara, NAD Kotharoad, Gopalapatnam, Vepagunta, Pendurthi |
| 333K | Town Kotharoad | K.Kotapadu | Railway Station, Kancharapalem, NAD Kotharoad, Gopalapatnam, Vepagunta, Pinagadi |
