= Pineapple Colony =

- Neighbourhood
- Location in Visakhapatnam
- Coordinates: 17.780100°N 83.271356°E
- Country: India
- State: Andhra Pradesh
- District: Visakhapatnam

Government
  - Body: Greater Visakhapatnam Municipal Corporation

Languages
  - Official: Telugu
- Time zone: UTC+5:30 (IST)
- PIN: 530040
- Vehicle registration: AP-31

Pineapple Colony is a neighborhood situated on the western part of Visakhapatnam City, India. The area, which falls under the local administrative limits of Greater Visakhapatnam Municipal Corporation, is lay down Simhachalam Hill Range . the originate of this colony people are pineapple farmers and government allotted lands to these farmers in 1970.
