= Sujatha Nagar =

- Neighbourhood
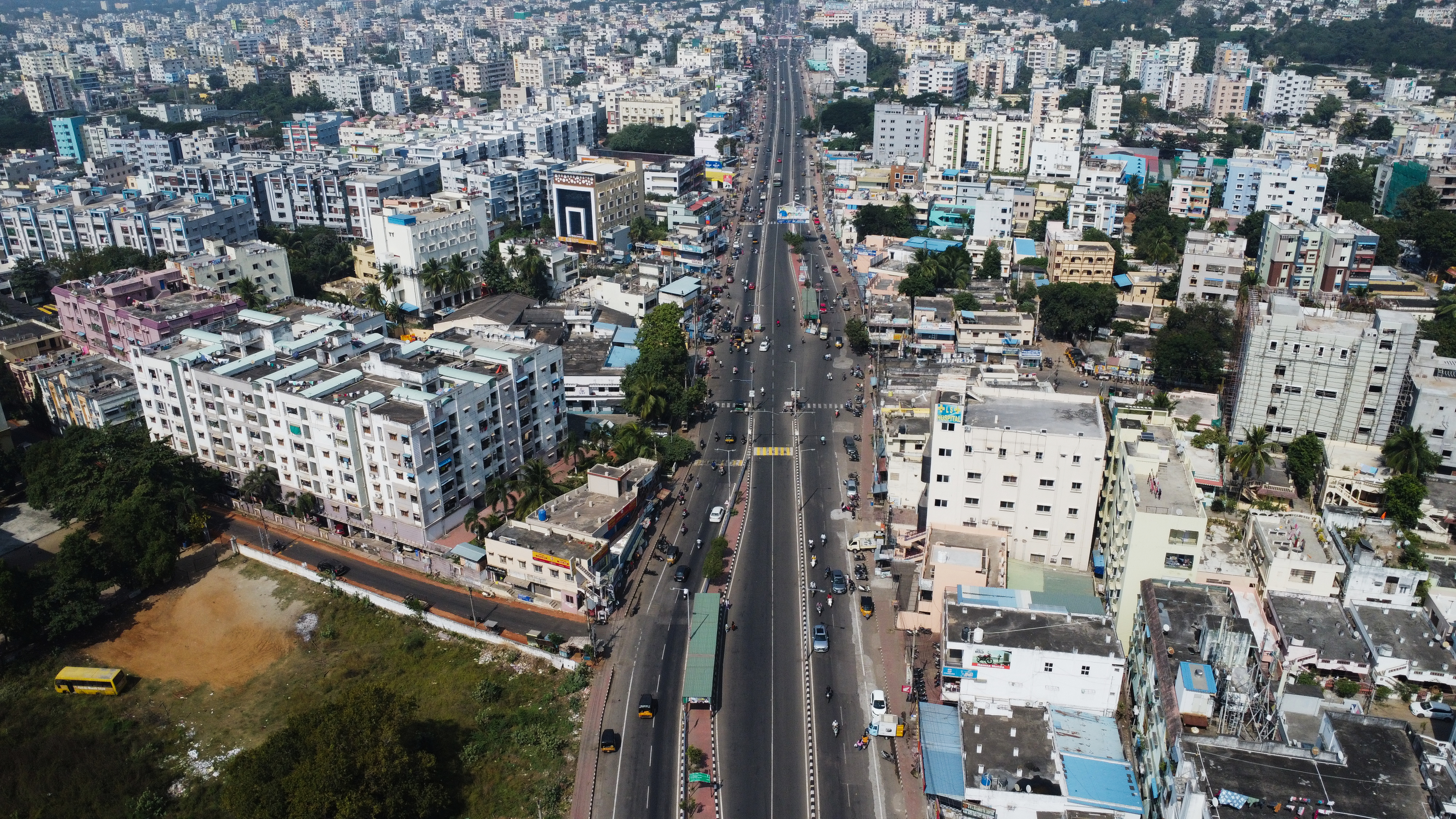
- Sujatha Nagar junction aerial view

- Location in Visakhapatnam
- Coordinates: 17.799927°N 83.214641°E
- Country: India
- State: Andhra Pradesh
- District: Visakhapatnam

Government
  - Body: Greater Visakhapatnam Municipal Corporation

Languages
  - Official: Telugu
- Time zone: UTC+5:30 (IST)
- PIN: 530051
- Vehicle registration: AP-31,32

Sujatha Nagar is a neighborhood situated in Visakhapatnam City, Andhra Pradesh, India. The area, which falls with the Greater Visakhapatnam Municipal Corporation, is about 2 kilometres (1.2 mi) from Pendurthi junction. Sujatha Nagar is home to many residential colonies, and it is well connected with NAD X Road, Gajuwaka, Simhachalam, Gopalapatnam, Jagadamba, and Maddilapalem. Nearest Railway stations are Pendurthi railway station and Simhachalam railway stations.

== Amenities ==
Amenities include psu/private banks, schools, colleges, clinics, sports designations, a mini theatre, branded cloth stores, parks, tuition centres, eateries, temples, and grocery stores.

== Transport ==
Nearest railway stations is Pendurthi, although auto rickshaws are frequently available. The following are the routes operated by the Andhra Pradesh State Road Transport Corporation (APSRTC) city service.

Route number	Start	End	Via
28J	Sujathanagar	RK Beach	Vepagunta, Gopalapatnam, NAD Kotharoad, Kancharapalem, Railway New Colony, RTC Complex, Jagadamba Centre
28A/28K	Pendurthi/Kothavalasa	RK Beach	Vepagunta, Gopalapatnam, NAD Kotharoad, Kancharapalem, Railway New Colony, RTC Complex, Jagadamba Centre
5J	Sujathanagar	Old Post Office	Vepagunta, Gopalapatnam, NAD Kotharoad, Kancharapalem, Convent, Town Kotharoad
68/68K	Pendurthi/Kothavalasa	RK Beach	Vepagunta, Simhachalam, Arilova, Hanumantuwaka, Maddilapalem, RTC Complex, Jagadamba Centre
6K	Kothavalasa	Old Head Post Office	Pendurthi, Vepagunta, Gopalapatnam, NAD Kotharoad, Kancharapalem, Convent, Town Kotharoad
541	Kothavalasa	Maddilapalem	Pendurthi, Vepagunta, Gopalapatnam, NAD Kotharoad, Birla Junction, Gurudwar
55K	Kothavalasa	Scindia	Pendurthi, Vepagunta, Gopalapatnam, NAD Kotharoad, Airport, BHPV, Gajuwaka, Malkapuram
12D	Devarapalle	RTC Complex	Kothavalasa, Pendurthi, Vepagunta, Gopalapatnam, NAD Kotharoad, Kancharapalem, Railway New Colony
300C	Chodavaram	RTC Complex	Sabbavaram, Pendurthi, Vepagunta, Gopalapatnam, NAD Kotharoad, Kancharapalem, Railway New Colony
