= Chinna Gadhili =

- Neighbourhood
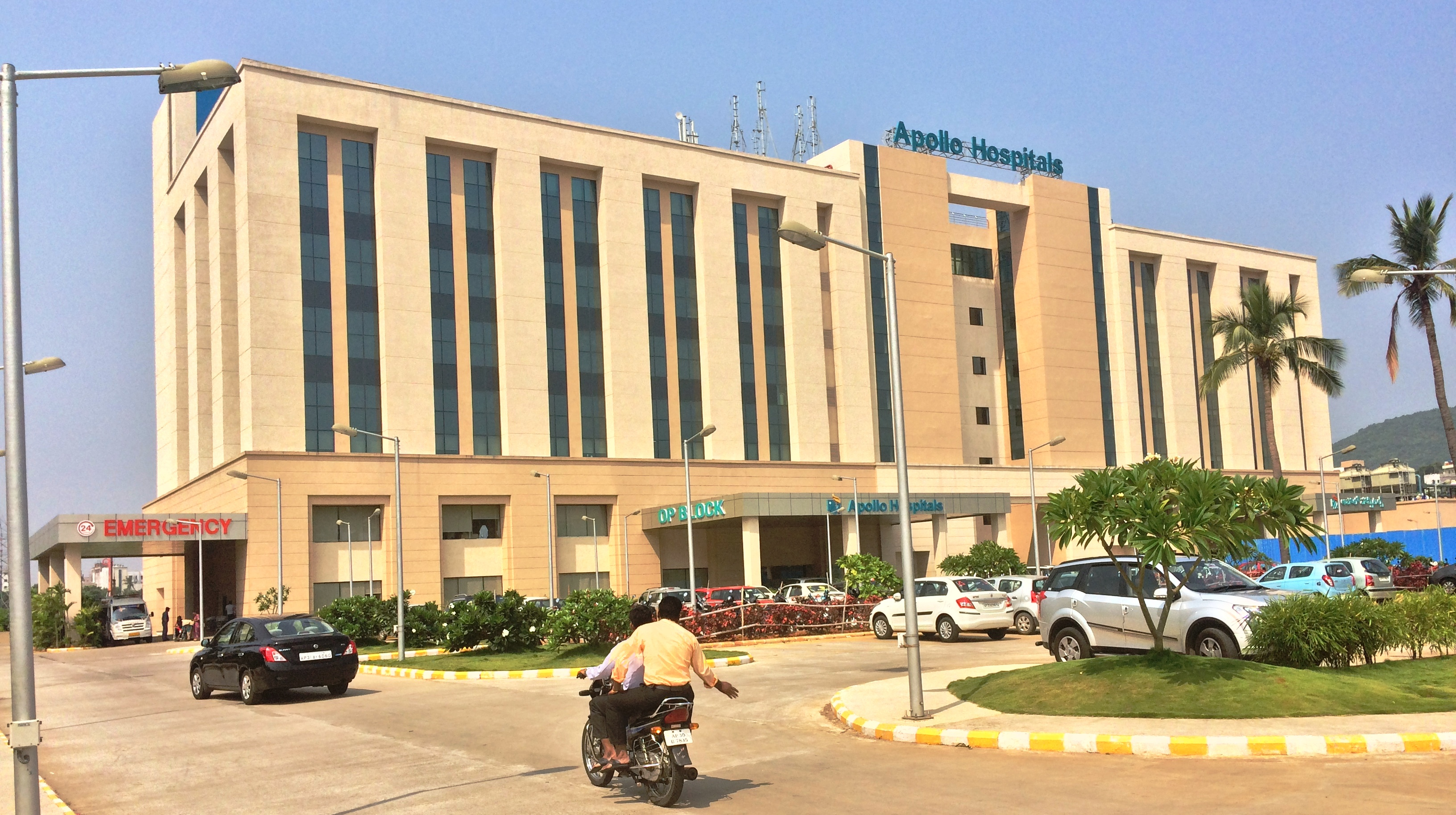
- Apollo Hospital at Health City

- Location in Visakhapatnam
- Coordinates: 17.762755°N 83.309622°E
- Country: India
- State: Andhra Pradesh
- District: Visakhapatnam

Government
  - Body: Greater Visakhapatnam Municipal Corporation

Languages
  - Official: Telugu
- Time zone: UTC+5:30 (IST)
- PIN: 530040
- Vehicle registration: AP 32 and AP 33

Chinna Gadhili is a neighbourhood in Visakhapatnam, Andhra Pradesh, India. It borders the neighbourhoods of Hanumanthavaka and Arilova. In 2016, the government of Andhra Pradesh named the area "Health City" with many corporate hospitals, including Apollo Hospitals, Q1 Hospitals, Navya Green Hills Hospitals and Pinnacle Hospitals.

The hilltop park Kailasagiri can be found close to this neighbourhood.
