= Sriharipuram =

- Neighbourhood
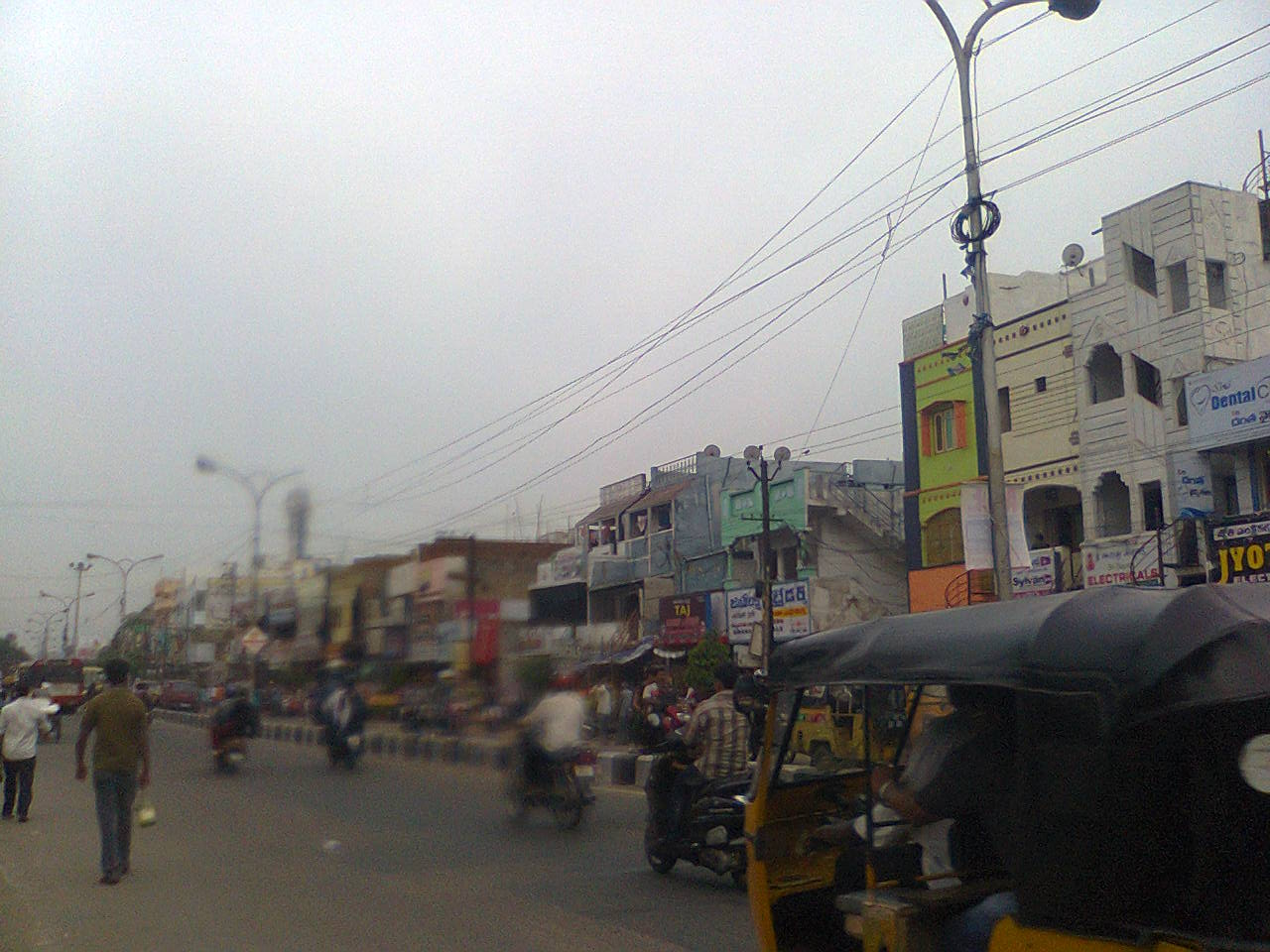
- Sriharipuram Main Road

- Location in Visakhapatnam
- Coordinates: 17.688546°N 83.236599°E
- Country: India
- State: Andhra Pradesh
- District: Visakhapatnam

Government
  - Type: Mayor-council
  - Body: Greater Visakhapatnam Municipal Corporation

Languages
  - Official: Telugu
- Time zone: UTC+5:30 (IST)
- PIN: 530011
- Vidhan Sabha constituency: Visakhapatnam West
- Lok Sabha constituency: Visakhapatnam

Sriharipuram is a neighbourhood in the city of Visakhapatnam, India. The neighbourhood is considered as the major residential area in the district. It is located within the jurisdiction of the Greater Visakhapatnam Municipal Corporation, which is responsible for the civic amenities in Sriharipuram . It is located on the south fringe of Visakhapatnam city.

== Location and Geography ==
Sriharipuram is located about 11 km from Visakhapatnam Airport and about 12 km from Visakhapatnam railway station. It lies to the south fringe of Visakhapatnam City and is loosely bordered by Gajuwaka to the west and Malkapuram to the east, Marripalem to the north, Gopalapatnam to the north-west and Pedagantyada to the south-west.

== Residential Areas ==
Jawahar Nagar, Ex-Service men Colony, Pavanaputra Nagar, Ajanta Colony, Ram Nagar, Burma Colony, Indira colony, Coromandel, Bala Ganapathi Street and Gullelapalem VUDA Colony are the local residential areas in Sriharipuram.

Hindustan Petroleum Corporation Ltd., Coromandel, Zinc Smelter, Hindustan Shipyard Ltd. are the major industries here.

== Transport ==
Sriharipuram is well connected by road. It also has major District roads connecting it to nearby mandals and Visakhapatnam. APSRTC runs bus services from Gajuwaka bus station to major parts of the state and Visakhapatnam city.

APSRTC routes

Route number	Start	End	Via
400	Gajuwaka	RTC Complex	New Gajuwaka, Sriharipuram, Malkapuram, Scindia, Naval Dockyard, Railway Station
99	Gajuwaka	R.K.Beach	New Gajuwaka, Sriharipuram, Malkapuram, Scindia, Naval Dockyard, Town Kotharoad, Jagadamba
600	Scindia	Anakapalli	Malkapuram, Sriharipuram, New Gajuwaka, Old Gajuwaka, Kurmannapalem and Lankelapalem
55	Scindia	Simhachalam	Malkapuram, Sriharipuram, New Gajuwaka, Old Gajuwaka, BHPV, Airport, NAD Junction, Gopalapatnam
