= Narava =

Narava నరవ
- Neighbourhood
- Location in Visakhapatnam
- Coordinates: 17.746048°N 83.181802°E
- Country: India
- State: Andhra Pradesh
- District: Visakhapatnam

Government
  - Body: Greater Visakhapatnam Municipal Corporation

Languages
  - Official: Telugu
- Time zone: UTC+5:30 (IST)
- PIN: 530027
- Vehicle registration: AP-31

Narava is a neighborhood situated on the western part of Visakhapatnam City, India. The area, which falls under the local administrative limits of Greater Visakhapatnam Municipal Corporation, is about 11 km from the Gajuwaka which is industrial area in the city. there are so many engineering and polytechnic colleges are located hear. APSRTC is providing 400S & 6B city bus routes to this area .

== Transport ==
APSRTC buses are available here.

APSRTC routes

Route number	Start	End	Via
6B	Chintagatla	Old Head Post Office	Narava, Kothapalem, NAD Kotharoad, Kancharapalem, Railway Station, Town Kotharoad
400S	Sabbavaram	Maddilapalem	Narava, VSEZ, Duvvada Railway Station, Kurmannapalem, Old Gajuwaka, New Gajuwaka, Malkapuram, Scindia, Railway Station, RTC Complex
