= Chintalagraharam =

- Neighbourhood
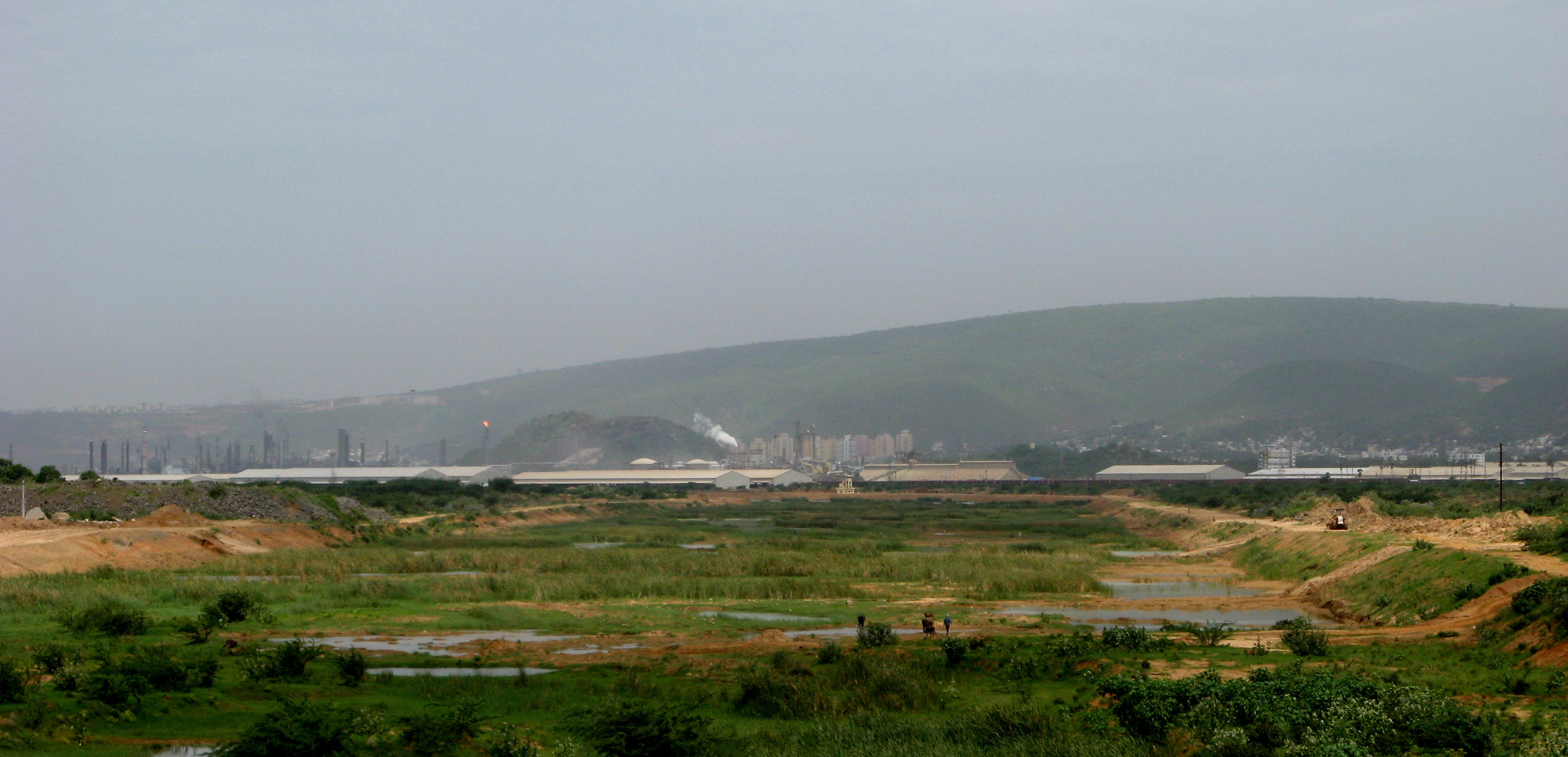
- Meghadri gedda river

- Location in Visakhapatnam
- Coordinates: 17.7848326°N 83.1997296°E
- Country: India
- State: Andhra Pradesh
- District: Visakhapatnam

Languages
  - Official: Telugu
- Time zone: UTC+5:30 (IST)

Chintalagraharam is a neighborhood in Visakhapatnam of the Indian state of Andhra Pradesh.

== Transport ==
APSRTC routes

| Route number | Start | End | Via |
|---|---|---|---|
| 28C | Chintalagraharam | RK Beach | Vepagunta, Gopalapatnam, NAD Kotharoad, Kancharapalem, Railway New Colony, RTC Complex, Jagadamba Centre |
