= Daspalla Hills =

Daspalla Hills దసపల్లా హిల్స్
- Neighbourhood
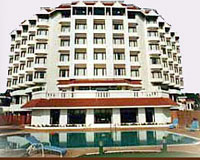
- Grand Bay Hotel at Daspalla Hills

- Location in Visakhapatnam
- Coordinates: 17.714007°N 83.315113°E
- Country: India
- State: Andhra Pradesh
- District: Visakhapatnam

Government
  - Body: Greater Visakhapatnam Municipal Corporation

Languages
  - Official: Telugu
- Time zone: UTC+5:30 (IST)
- PIN: 530002
- Vehicle registration: AP-31

Daspalla Hills is an important neighborhood situated on the coastal part of Visakhapatnam City, India. The area, which falls under the local administrative limits of Greater Visakhapatnam Municipal Corporation, is about 3 km from the Dwaraka Nagar which is city centre. Daspalla Hills is one of the more affluent residential areas of the city.
