= Kurmannapalem =

- Neighbourhood
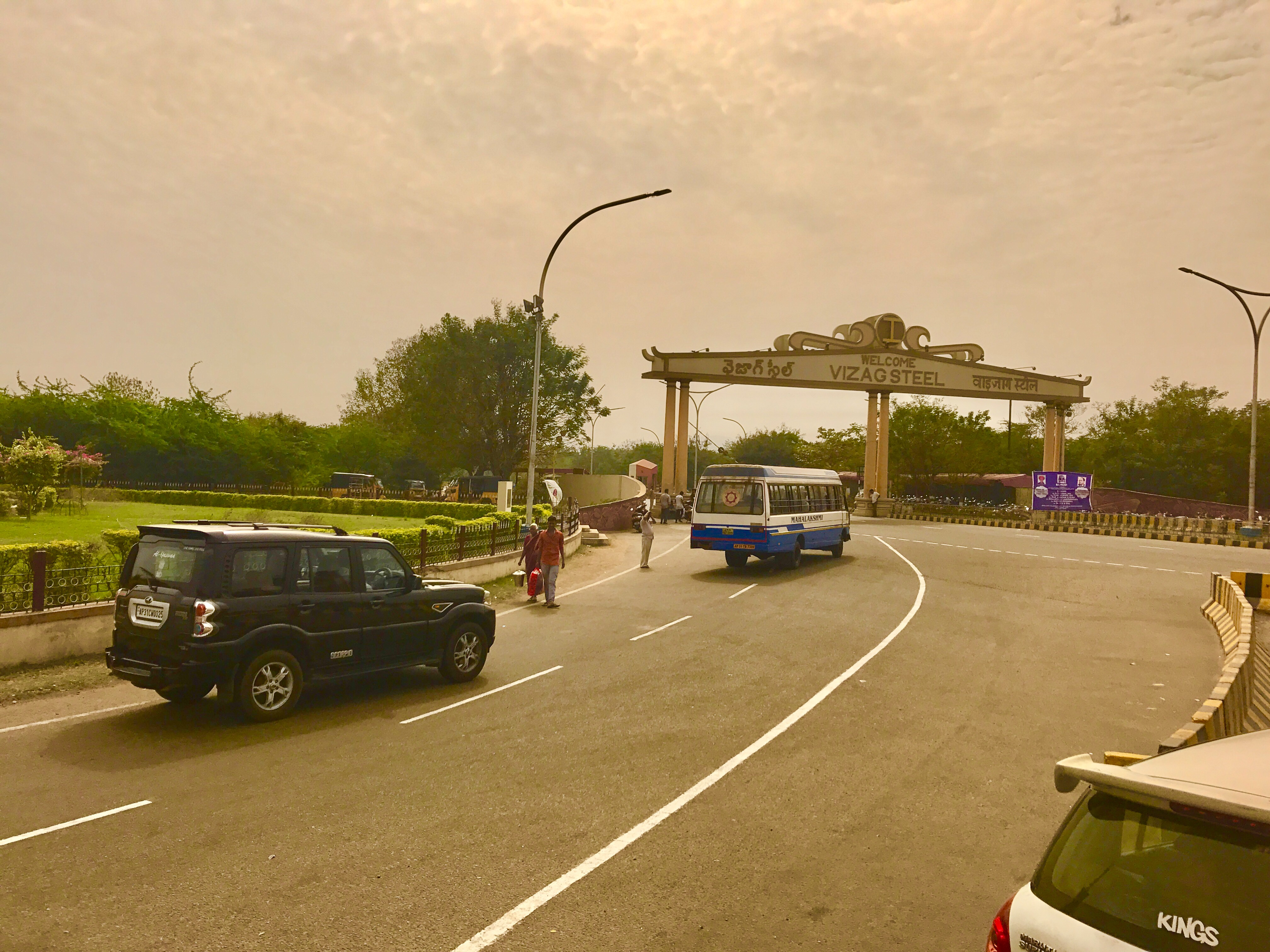
- Vizag steel plant entrance at Kurmannapalem

- Location in Visakhapatnam
- Coordinates: 17°41′06″N 83°10′03″E
- Country: India
- State: Andhra Pradesh
- District: Visakhapatnam

Government
  - Body: Greater Visakhapatnam Municipal Corporation

Languages
  - Official: Telugu
- Time zone: UTC+5:30 (IST)
- PIN: 530046
- Vehicle Registration: AP31, AP32 (Former); AP39 (from 30 January 2019)

Kurmannapalem is an Urban neighbourhood area of the city of Visakhapatnam, India and belongs to the Greater Visakhapatnam Municipal Corporation. It has a population of 60,588 (2001 census) and forms part of the Visakhapatnam city under Gajuwaka Revenue Mandal.

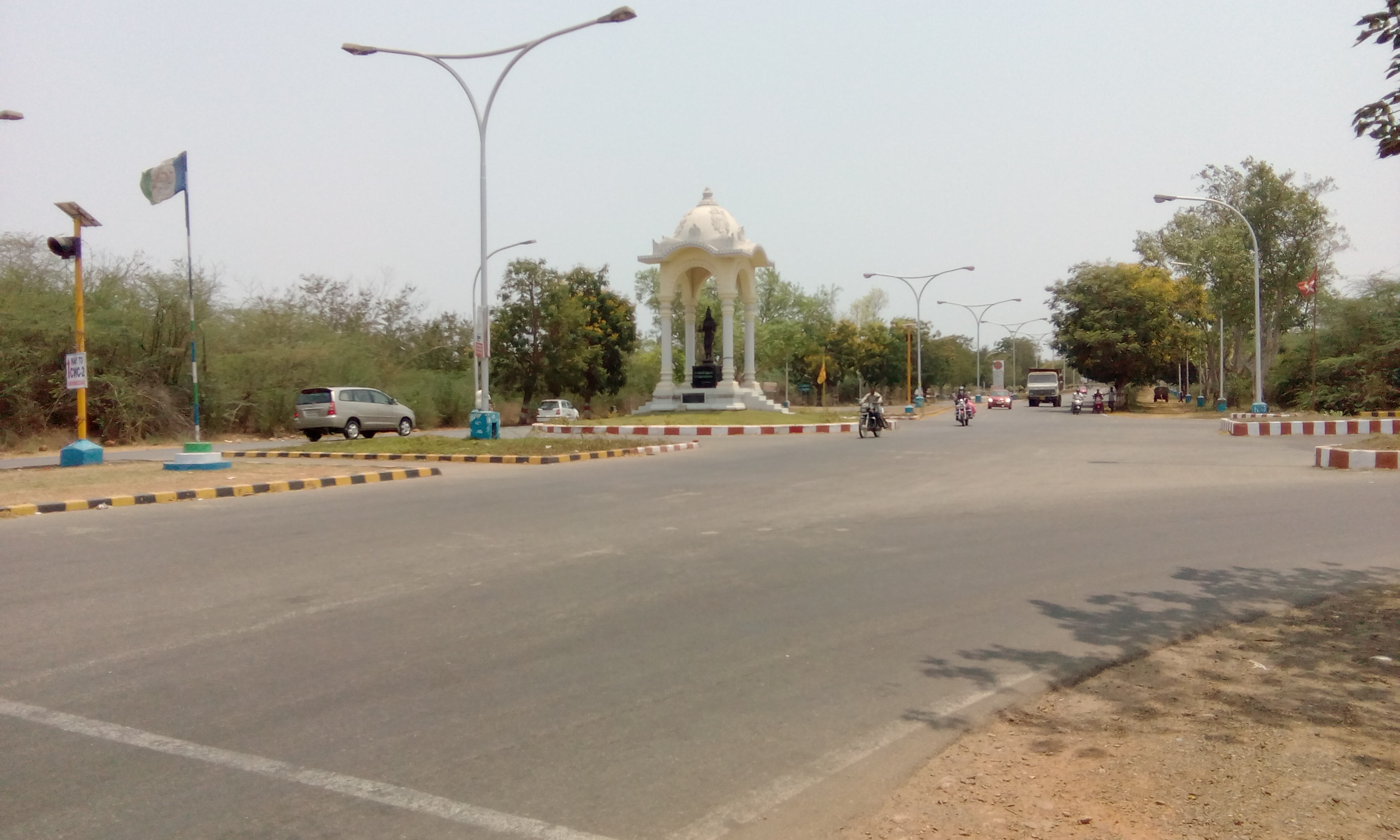
Ukkunagaram main road

== Features ==
- Kurmannapalem is a residential area in proximity to the international airport and a major railway station at Duvvada. It is also very well connected to Vishakhapatnam's main employment hubs.
- Yadava Jaggaraju Peta, Prasanthinagar, Gajuwaka, Auto Nagar, and Duvvada are the surrounding areas of Kurmannapalem.
- It is one of the most busy and growing regions of Visakhapatnam in terms of real estate, due to the presence of Vizag steelplant, Pharma city, Apparel city and SEZ regions nearby.
- The steel city bus depot is run by APSRTC; buses access all parts of the city.

== Locality ==
Chennai-Kolkata Highway (NH 16) is the major roadway of the locality connecting the other parts of Vishakhapatnam to the neighborhood.

Vishakhapatnam International Airport is 15 km from the locality and can be reached via NH16. Duvvada Railway station (2 km) is the nearest available train facility. Kurmanipalem is the local bus stand aiding the daily commute of the residents. A metro facility is planned in the future from the steel plant gate situated in Kurmannapalem, to Kommadi.

== Education and healthcare ==
Some reputable educational institutions in and around Kurmannapalem are Dr. K.K.R's Gowtham Concept, Sri Ramakrishna English Medium School, Gloria English Medium School, Bharat ITI College, and Sri Gayatri Junior College.

The locality is close to some renowned multi-specialty hospitals like Sree Vaishnavi Health Care and Dental, Esi Dispensary Hospital, and Sree Venkata Padmavathi Healthcare.

== Employment hubs ==
The Visakhapatnam Steel Plant is only 10 km from the locality. The locality also houses many small-scale engineering work companies such as Sri Lakshmi Sai Engg, Works, Beekay Structural Steels, Vesuvius India Limited, and Jami Hydraulics Pvt. Ltd.

The Visakhapatnam Special Economic Zone can be reached within 3 km.

The Shipyard of Vishakhapatnam is only 12 km from Kurmannapalem

== Transport ==
APSRTC routes

Route number	Start	End	Via
400N	Vaada Cheepurapalli	RTC Complex	Paravada, Steel Plant, Kurmannapalem, Old Gajuwaka, New Gajuwaka, Sriharipuram, Malkapuram, Scindia, Naval Dockyard, Visakhapatnam Railway Station
400Y	Yelamanchili	RTC Complex	Atchuthapuram, Paravada, Steel Plant, Kurmannapalem, Old Gajuwaka, New Gajuwaka, Sriharipuram, Malkapuram, Scindia, Naval Dockyard, Visakhapatnam Railway Station
99K	Kurmannapalem	R.K.Beach	Old Gajuwaka, New Gajuwaka, Sriharipuram, Malkapuram, Scindia, Naval Dockyard, Old Post Office, Jagadamba, Maharanipeta
38K	Steel Plant Sector 5	RTC Complex	BHPV, Airport, NAD Kotharoad, Birla Junction, Gurudwar
111	Kurmannapalem	Tagarapuvalasa	Old Gajuwaka, BHPV, Airport, NAD Kotharoad, Birla Junction, Gurudwar, Maddilapalem, Hanumanthuwaka, Yendada, Madhurawada, Anandapuram
600	Scindia	Anakapalle	Lankelapalem, Kurmannapalem, Old Gajuwaka, New Gajuwaka, Sriharipuram, Malkapuram
38Y	Duvvada Railway Station	RTC Complex	Kurmannaplem, Old Gajuwaka, BHPV, Airport, NAD Kotharoad, Birla Junction, Gurudwar
404	Steelplant Main Gate	PM Palem	Old Gajuwaka, BHPV, Airport, NAD Kotharoad, Birla Junction, Gurudwar, Maddilapalem, Hanumanthuwaka, Yendada
500	Anakapalle	RTC Complex	Lankelapalem, Kurmannaplem, Old Gajuwaka, BHPV, Airport, NAD Kotharoad, Birla Junction, Gurudwar
