= Daba Gardens =

- Neighbourhood
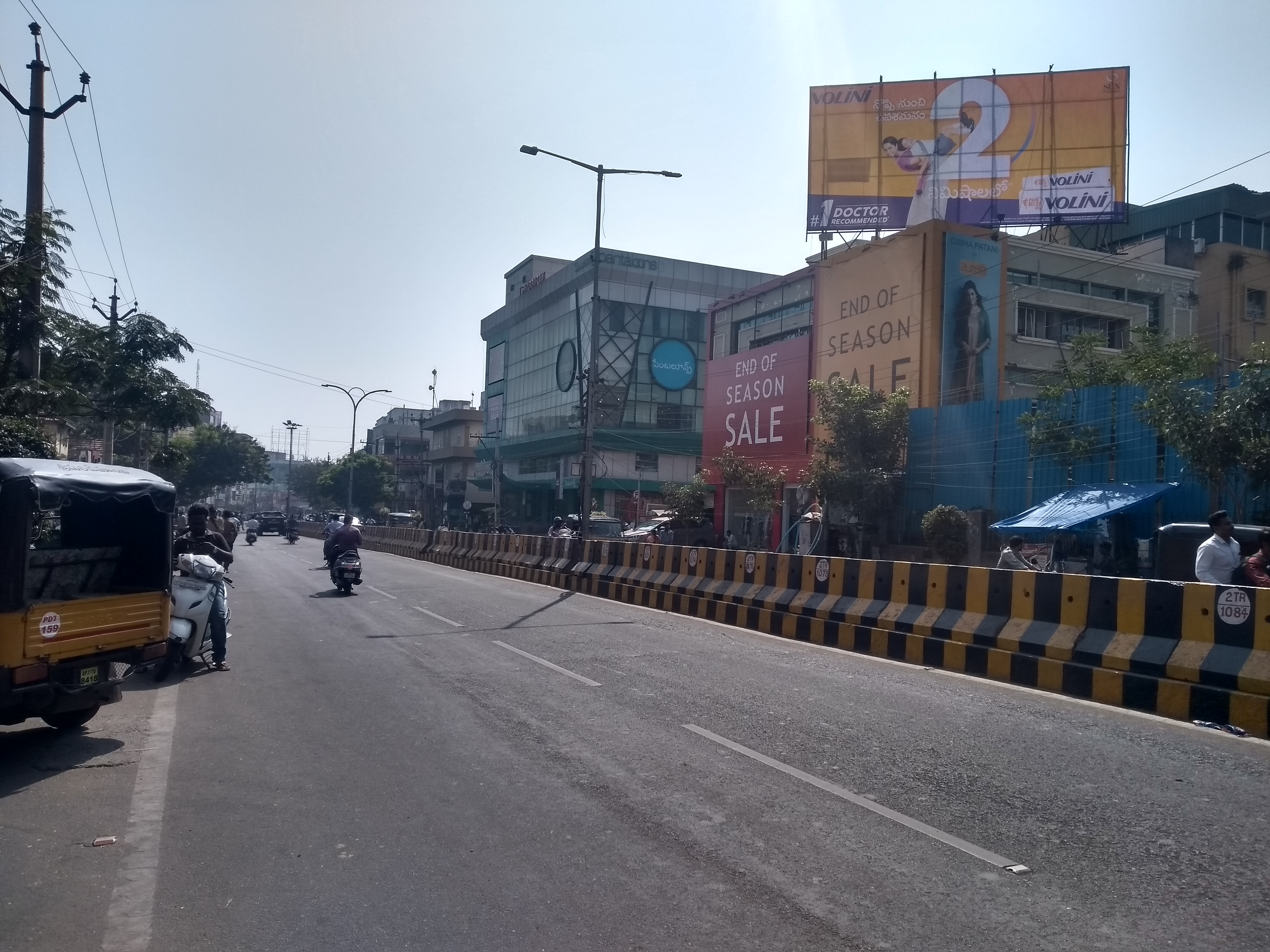
- Daba Gardens Road

- Location in Visakhapatnam
- Coordinates: 17°42′55″N 83°17′47″E
- Country: India
- State: Andhra Pradesh
- District: Visakhapatnam

Government
  - Body: Greater Visakhapatnam Municipal Corporation

Languages
  - Official: Telugu
- Time zone: UTC+5:30 (IST)
- Postal code: 530020
- Vehicle registration: AP

Daba Gardens ("Daba Vari Thota") is a neighbourhood in Visakhapatnam, Andhra Pradesh, India. It is hub for shopping malls, electronic shopping especially, shopping for cell phones, restaurants, educational institutes etc. LIC building is the main landmark in this area. BSNL office is also situated here.

== Commerce ==
It is a major commercial area in Visakhapatnam. It is oldest suburb in the city. There is a lot of shopping malls like Pantaloons, MF Khan, Hirawats etc.
