= Kirlampudi Layout =

- Neighbourhood
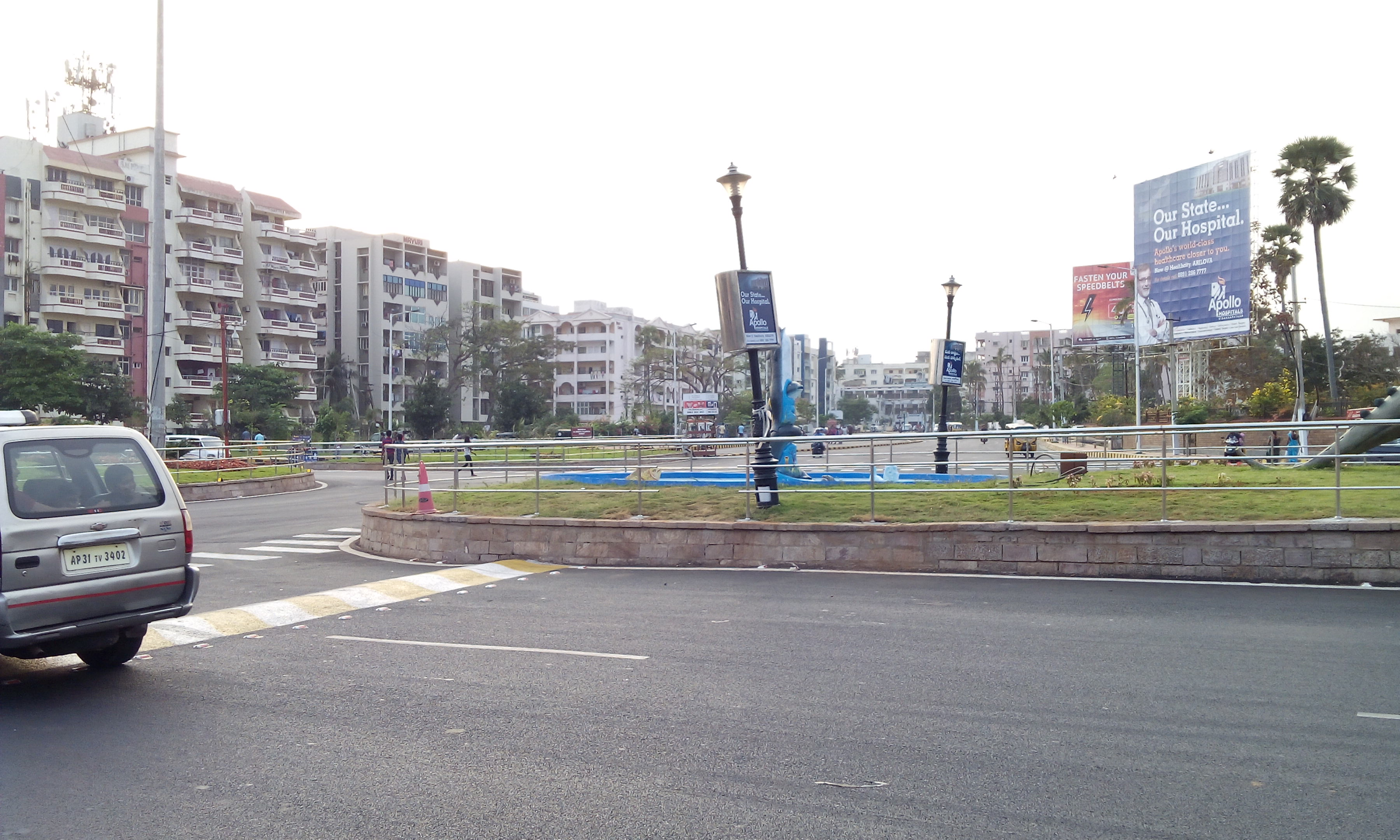
- Road at Kirlampudi Layout

- Location in Visakhapatnam
- Coordinates: 17.720423°N 83.329709°E
- Country: India
- State: Andhra Pradesh
- District: Visakhapatnam

Government
  - Body: Greater Visakhapatnam Municipal Corporation

Languages
  - Official: Telugu
- Time zone: UTC+5:30 (IST)
- PIN: 530017
- Vehicle registration: AP-31

Kirlampudi Layout is a neighbourhood of the city of Visakhapatnam, state of Andhra Pradesh, India.

== About ==
It is one of the important neighbourhoods in Visakhapatnam and is one of the more affluent areas in the city.

== Transport ==
It is well connected with Gajuwaka, NAD X Road, Malkapuram, Dwaraka Nagar and Visakhapatnam Steel Plant.

APSRTC routes

Route number	Start	End	Via
14	Venkojipalem	Old Head Post Office	Appughar, Chinnawaltair, Siripuram, Jagadamba Centre, Town Kotharoad
210	Ravindra Nagar	Gantyada HB Colony	Hanumanthuwaka, Appughar, MVP Colony, Pedawaltair, Siripuram, RK Beach, Jagadamba Centre, Town Kotharoad, Convent, Scindia, Malkapuram, New Gajuwaka, Pedagantyada
