= Sagar Nagar =

- Neighbourhood
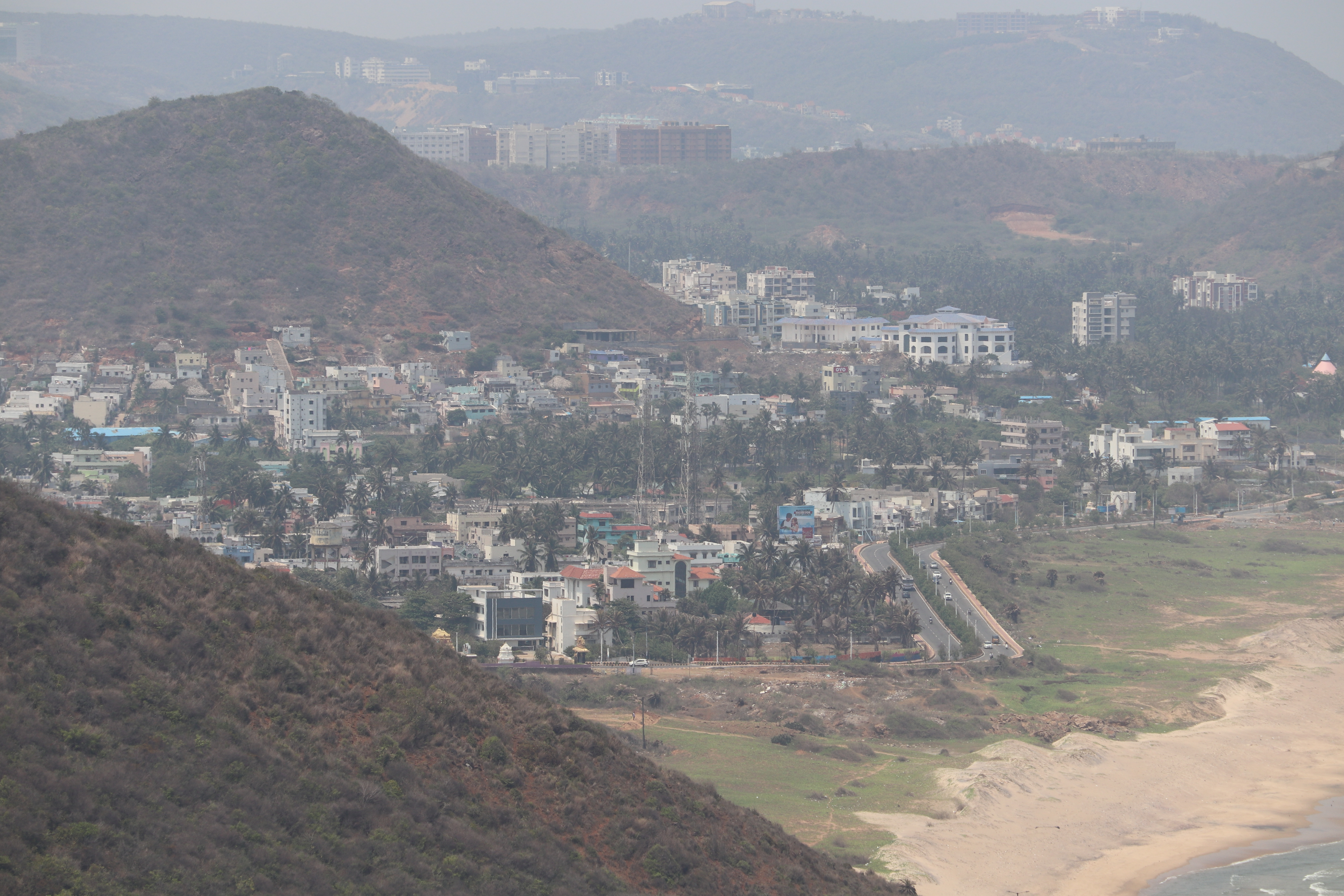
- Sagar Nagar View From Kailasagiri

- Location in Visakhapatnam
- Coordinates: 17.764513°N 83.357335°E
- Country: India
- State: Andhra Pradesh
- District: Visakhapatnam

Government
  - Body: Greater Visakhapatnam Municipal Corporation

Languages
  - Official: Telugu
- Time zone: UTC+5:30 (IST)
- PIN: 530045
- Vehicle registration: AP-31

Sagar Nagar is a neighborhood of the city of Visakhapatnam, Andhra Pradesh, India, on the coast of the Bay of Bengal. In 2025, there were plans to develop Sagar Nagar beach. It is located in Ward 8 (Rushikonda) of Zone 2 under GVMC.

== About ==
Sagar Nagar is located between Bheemunipatnam and Visakhapatnam beach road.

== Transport ==
This residential area is well connected with Dwaraka Nagar and Dwaraka bus station. The bus route 900K connects Sagar Nagar with Railway Station and Bhemili.
