= Allipuram =

- Neighbourhood
- Location in Visakhapatnam
- Coordinates: 17.719273°N 83.297143°E
- Country: India
- State: Andhra Pradesh
- District: Visakhapatnam

Government
  - Body: Greater Visakhapatnam Municipal Corporation
  - Member of Legislative Assembly: Vamsi Krishna Yadav

Languages
  - Official: Telugu
- Time zone: UTC+5:30 (IST)
- PIN: 530004
- Vehicle registration: AP 31, AP 32 and AP 33

Allipuram is one of the oldest suburbs in Visakhapatnam, Andhra Pradesh, India, close to Visakhapatnam Railway Station. It is near shore to Bay of Bengal. In 1753, Nizam Fauzdar Zafar Ali Khan ruled Visakhapatnam as the center of Chicaco. Allipuram was once a prosperous village, which was frequented by traders who picked up the produce of smiths and weavers. More importantly, the village was once known as Alivelu Manga Puram. Over time it became Allipuram in popular usage. As part of the Salt Satyagraha, Mahatma Gandhi walked along the Allipuram main road to the coast. Because of this, the locals set up a statue of Gandhi on the main road.

== Neighborhood areas ==
Railway Quarters, Daba Gardens, Dondaparthy, Jagadamba Centre, Railway New Colony are the nearby Localities to Allipuram. Also, Vizag 2 town police station is located here.

== Temples ==
One of the famous temples of Vizag Sri Balligiri Venkateswara Swamy Temple is located here.

== Transport ==
Allipuram is well connected to Visakhapatnam APSRTC bus station. The nearest Railway Station is Visakhapatnam Railway Station .

APSRTC routes

Route Number	Start	End	Via
900	Railway Station	Maddilapalem	Allipuram, RTC Complex, Siripuram, Pedawaltair, MVP Colony, Venkojipalem
69	Railway Station	Arilova Colony	Allipuram, RTC Complex, Gurudwar, Seethammadhara, HB Colony, Hanumanthuwaka
12D	Devarapalle	RTC Complex	Kothavalasa, Pendurthi, Vepagunta, Gopalapatnam, NAD Kotharoad, Kancharapalem, Railway New Colony
300C	Chodavaram	RTC Complex	Sabbavaram, Pinagadi, Vepagunta, Gopalapatnam, NAD Kotharoad, Kancharapalem, Railway New Colony
222	Railway Station	Tagarapuvalasa	RTC Complex, Gurudwar, Maddilapalem, Hanumanthuwaka, Yendada, Madhurawada, Anandapuram
999	Railway Station	Bhimili	RTC Complex, Maddilapalem, Hanumanthuwaka, Yendada, Madhurawada, Anandapuram
