= Arilova =

- Neighborhood
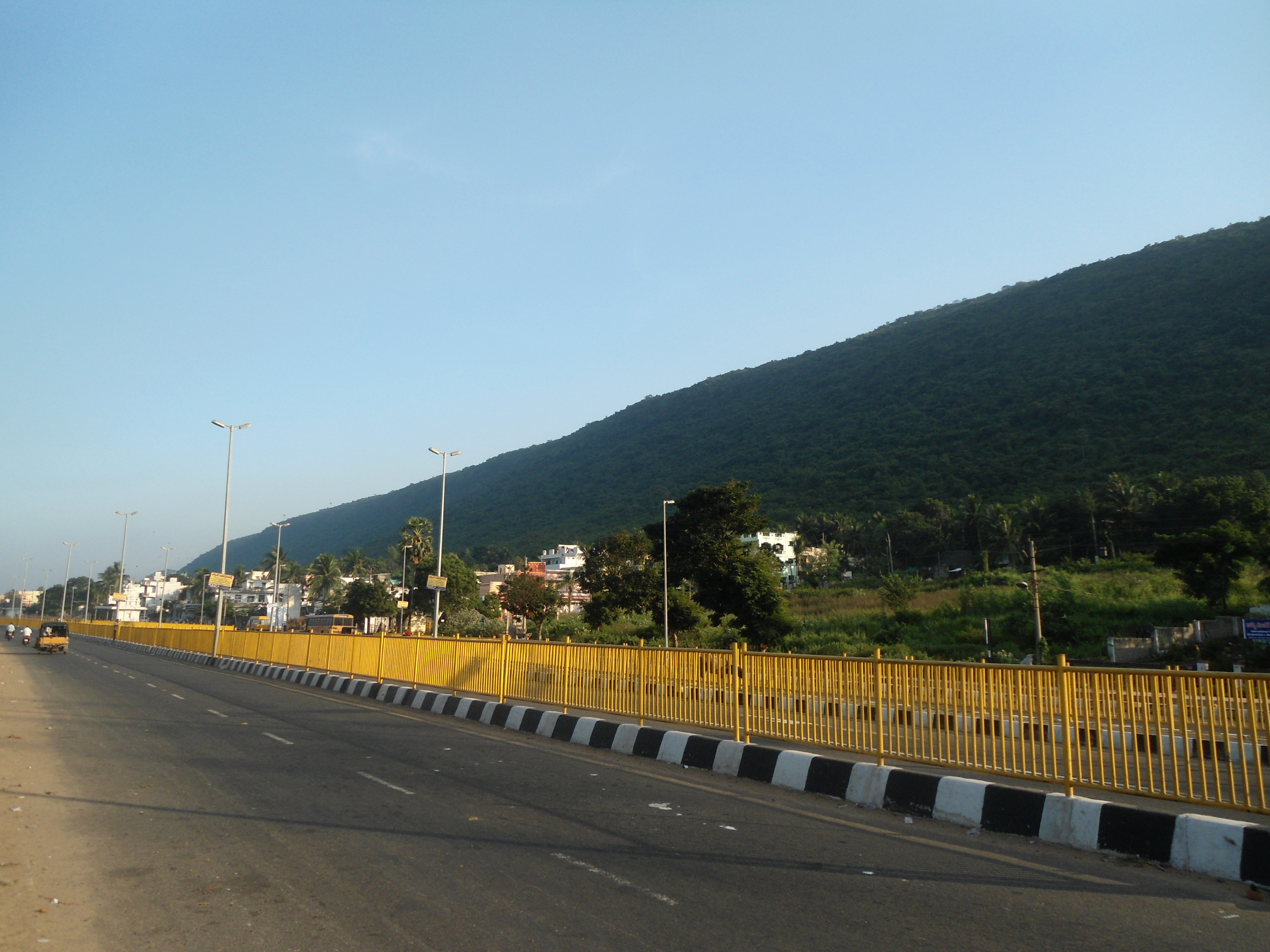
- BRTS road at Arilova

- Location in Visakhapatnam
- Coordinates: 17.767921°N 83.310008°E
- Country: India
- State: Andhra Pradesh
- District: Visakhapatnam

Government
  - Body: Greater Visakhapatnam Municipal Corporation

Languages
  - Official: Telugu
- Time zone: UTC+5:30 (IST)
- Postal code: 530057
- Vehicle registration: AP 31, AP 32 and AP 33

Arilova is a residential area of Visakhapatnam, Andhra Pradesh, India. It is located on the north fringe of Visakhapatnam city with hills surrounding on opposite sides. It is located beside Kailasagiri. Arilova is a Part of GVMC Greater Visakhapatnam Municipal Corporation, which is responsible for the civic amenities in Arilova.

Arilova is mainly a middle-class hub. Arilova comes under Visakhapatnam- East Constituency. Arilova plays an important role in every aspect of Visakhapatnam. It is also known as the Health City of Visakhapatnam as many hospitals are being built in and around Arilova.

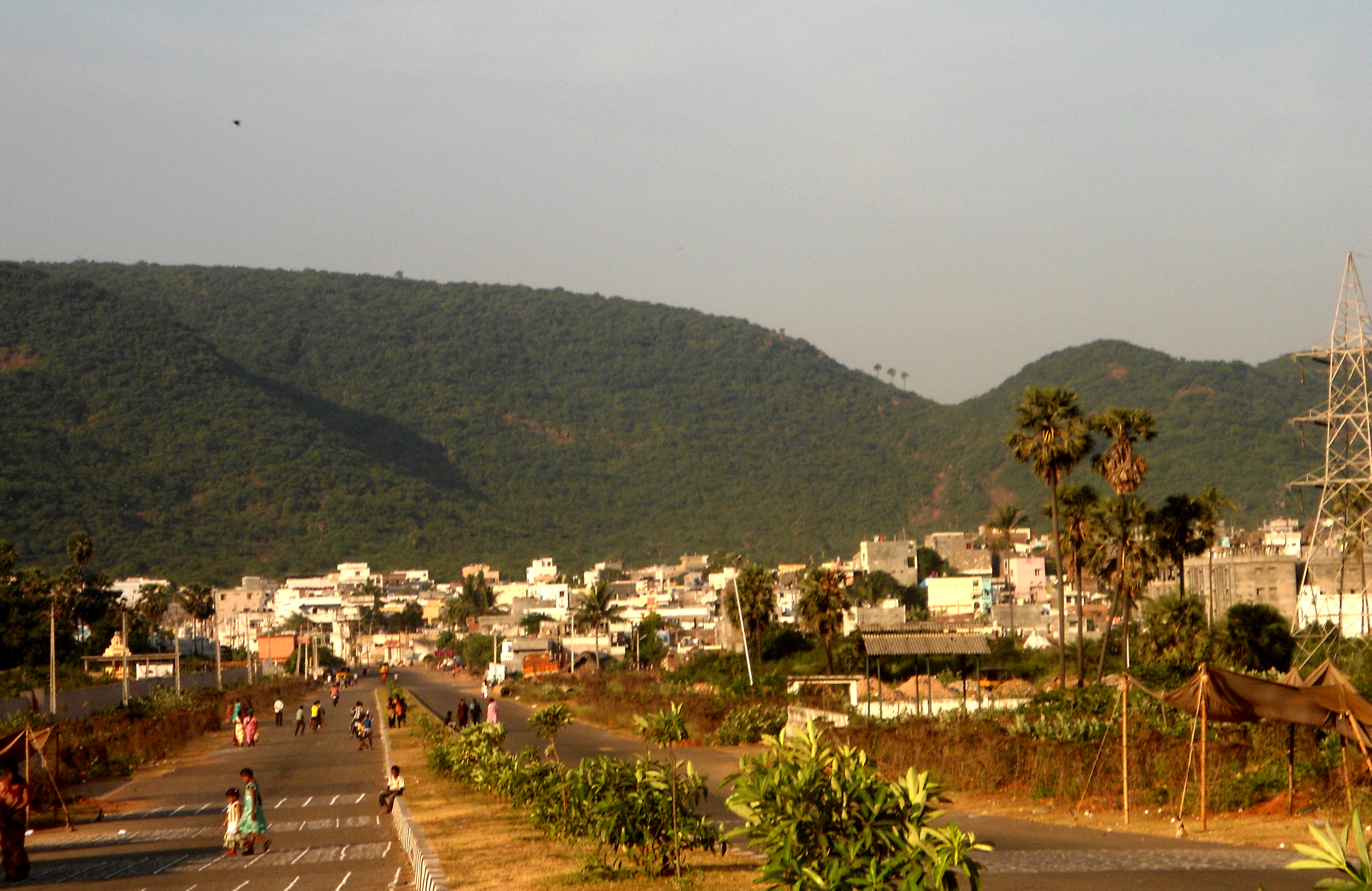
A view of Arilova

== Localities ==
Kailasnagar and Sri Hari Nagar, Arilova Colony, Durganagar, TIC Point, Ambedkar Nagar, Parvathi Nagar, Apsara Colony, Mustafa Colony, Balaji Nagar, and Thotagaruvu are important residential areas in Arilova. The East Point golf club was also located in Arilova. Mudasarlova Reservoir is Located near this place. Hanumanthuwaka, Kailasagiri, M.V.P, Venkojipalem are places located around Visakhapatnam.

== Hospitals ==
The nearest major hospitals are the Visakha Institute of Medical Science, L.V. Prasad Eye Hospital, Apollo hospital, Narayana Medciti, Care Hospital, Gims Hospital, Pinnacle hospitals, M.B Hospital, and diabetics hospitals. Arilova is also known as the Health City of Visakhapatnam.

== Transport ==
Arilova is well connected to most locations of the city by the state-owned bus service, APSRTC. Arilova as Bus Rapid Transit System Roads. Any part of Vizag can be reached in just a few minutes. Arilova is directly connected to Visakhapatnam Railway Station, Dwaraka Nagar, Jagadamba Centre, MVP Colony, Asilmetta and Simhachalam. Arilova BRTS is a crucial part of the circuit in the city. Bus routes from Arilova: 69-Railway station, 60c-Jagadamba, 60b-RK Beach, 400-Gajuwaka & 500-Anakapalli.

APSRTC routes

Route number	Start	End	Via
60C	Arilova Colony	Old Head Post Office	Pedagadili, Hanumanthuwaka, Maddilapalem, RTC Complex, Jagadamba Centre, Town Kotharoad
60R	Arilova Colony	RK Beach	Pedagadili, Hanumanthuwaka, Maddilapalem, RTC Complex, Jagadamba Centre
69	Arilova Colony	Railway Station	Pedagadili, Hanumanthuwaka, Venkojipalem, Seethammadhara, Satyam Junction, Gurudwar, RTC Complex
68K/68	Kothavalasa/Pendurthi	RK Beach	Vepagunta, Simhachalam, Adavivaram, Pedagadili, Hanumanthuwaka, Maddilapalem, RTC Complex, Jagadamba Centre
60	Simhachalam	Old Head Post Office	Adavivaram, Pedagadili, Hanumanthuwaka, Maddilapalem, RTC Complex, Jagadamba Centre, Town Kotharoad
