= Dondaparthy =

- Neighbourhood
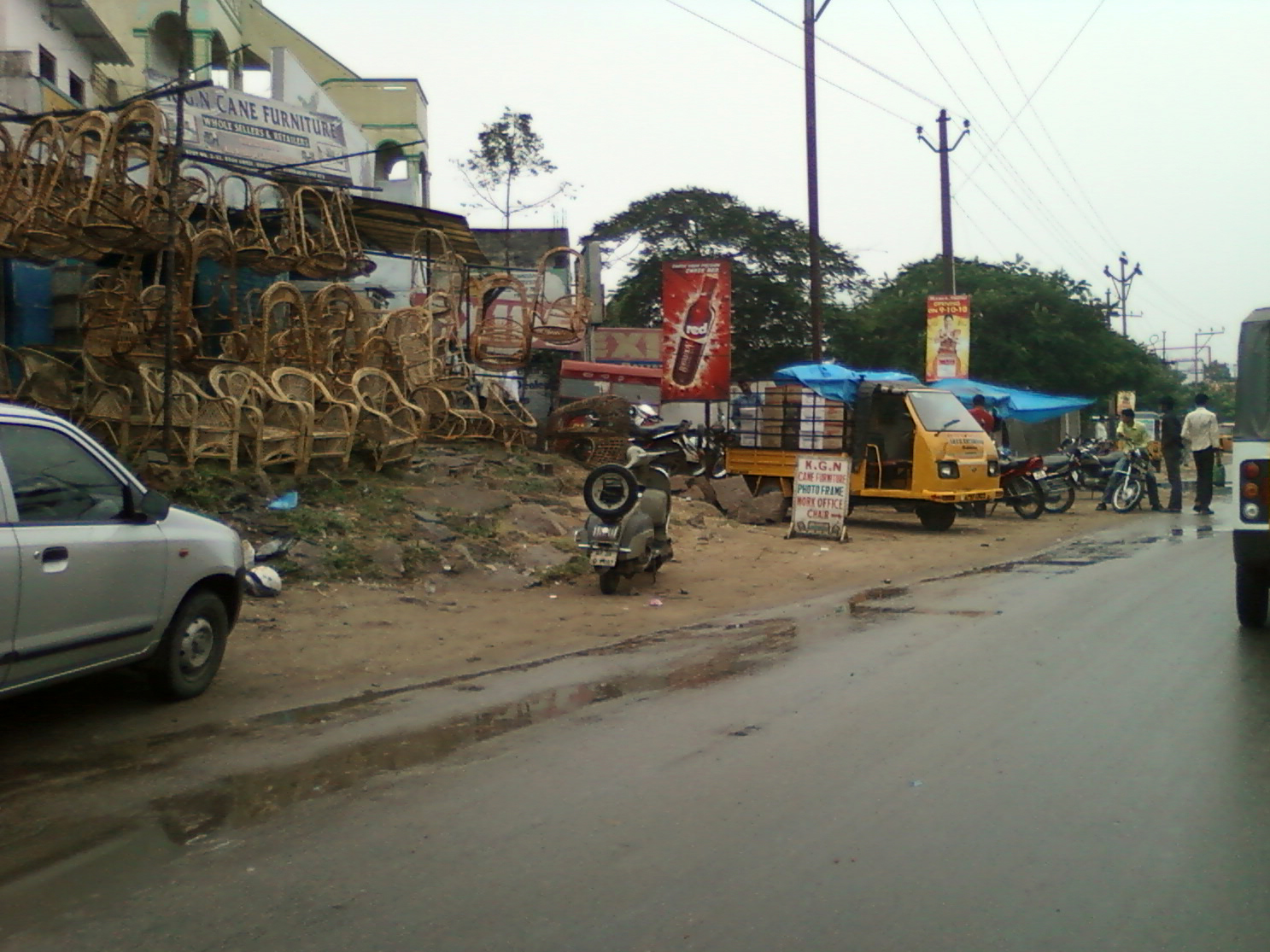
- Road at Srikanya Theater in Dondaparthy

- Location in Visakhapatnam
- Coordinates: 17.728272°N 83.301650°E
- Country: India
- State: Andhra Pradesh
- District: Visakhapatnam

Government
  - Body: Greater Visakhapatnam Municipal Corporation

Languages
  - Official: Telugu
- Time zone: UTC+5:30 (IST)
- PIN: 530016

Dondaparthy is a mixed residential zone and commercial area in central Visakhapatnam. It is an important neighborhood in Visakhapatnam.

== Accessibility ==
- Dondaparthy is located close to the famous locality of Dwaraka Nagar.
- Dondaparthy is situated towards the south of the Visakhapatnam city center. The distance between Dondaparthi and city center is a little more than 1.8 km.
- Visakhapatnam Railway Station, the premium railway station in Vizag, is less than 1 km from Dondaparthi.
- Dondaparthi is surrounded by Railway New Colony Road, Thatichetlapalem Road, Akkayyapalem Road and Railway Station Road.
- Telugu Talli Flyover is connecting from Asilmetta to Dondaparthi is 1.8 km.

== Transportation ==
Dondaparthy is well connected to Gajuwaka, Gopalapatnam, NAD X Road, Arilova and Maddilapalem

APSRTC routes

Route number	Start	End	Via
400	Gajuwaka/Kurmannapalem	RTC Complex	New Gajuwaka, Sriharipuram, Malkapuram, Scindia, Naval Dockyard, Railway Station
400K	Duvvada Railway Station	Maddilapalem	New Gajuwaka, Sriharipuram, Malkapuram, Scindia, Naval Dockyard, Railway Station, RTC Complex
400T	Steelplant	Maddilapalem	New Gajuwaka, Sriharipuram, Malkapuram, Scindia, Naval Dockyard, Railway Station, RTC Complex
400H	Gantyada HB Colony	Maddilapalem	New Gajuwaka, Sriharipuram, Malkapuram, Scindia, Naval Dockyard, Railway Station, RTC Complex
404	Steelplant Gate	PM Palem	New Gajuwaka, Sriharipuram, Malkapuram, Scindia, Naval Dockyard, Railway Station, RTC Complex, Maddilapalem, Hanumanthuwaka, Yendada
28	Simhachalam	R.K.Beach	Gopalapatnam, NAD Kotharoad, Kancharapalem, RTC Complex, Jagadamba Centre
28K/28A	Kothavalasa/Pendurthi	RTC Complex	Gopalapatnam, NAD Kotharoad, Kancharapalem, RTC Complex, Jagadamba Centre
48	Madhavadhara	MN Club	Muralinagar, Kailasapuram, Akkayyapalem, RTC Complex, Jagadamba Centre, Town Kotharoad
48A	Madhavadhara	Old Head Post Office	Muralinagar, Kailasapuram, Akkayyapalem, RTC Complex, Dabagardens, Town Kotharoad
