= Railway New Colony =

- Neighbourhood
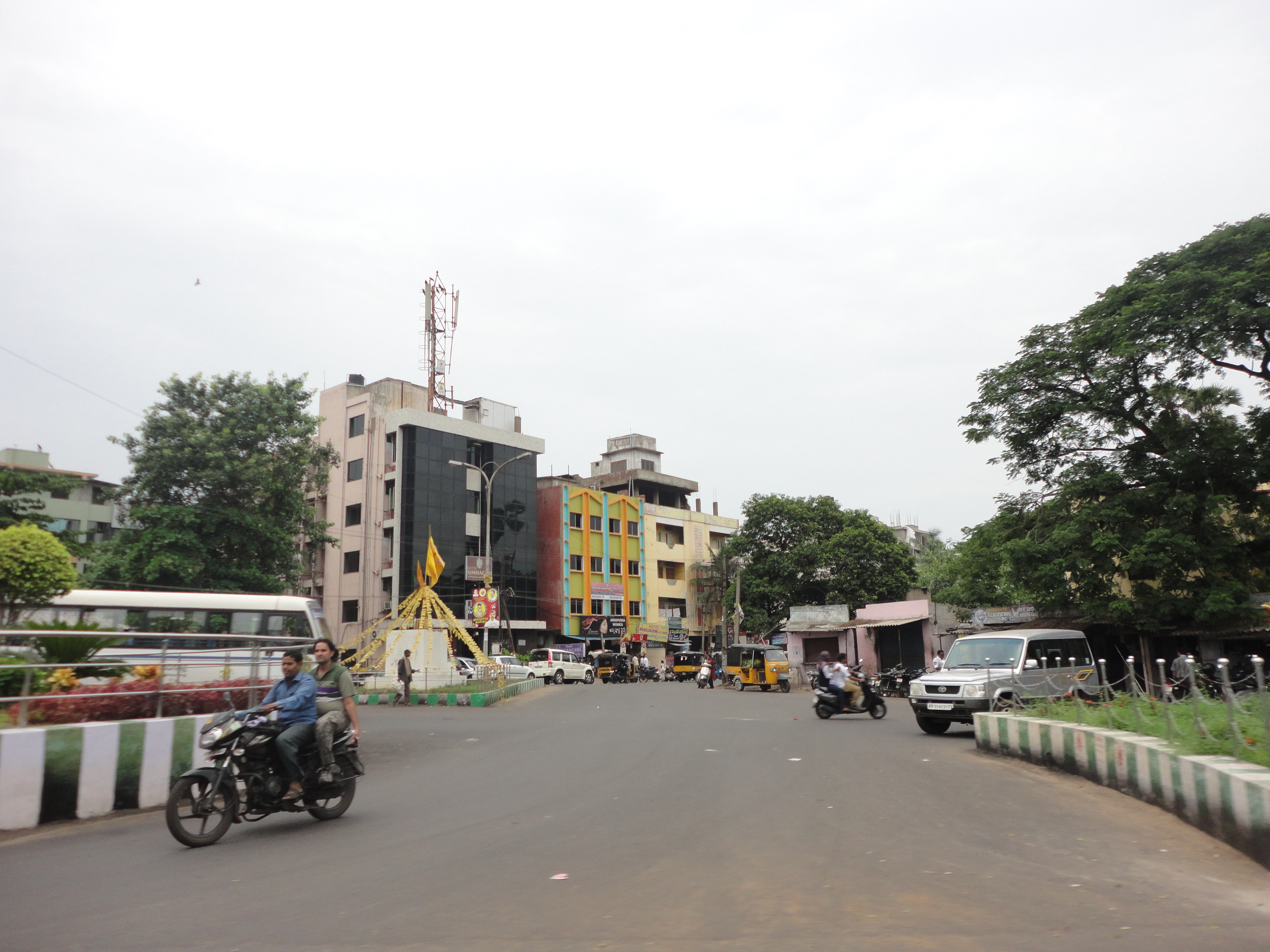
- Railway New Colony Road

- Location in Visakhapatnam
- Coordinates: 17°44′33″N 83°19′1″E
- Country: India
- State: Andhra Pradesh
- District: Visakhapatnam

Government
  - Body: Greater Visakhapatnam Municipal Corporation

Languages
  - Official: Telugu
- Time zone: UTC+5:30 (IST)
- PIN: 530016

Railway New Colony is one of the commercial and residential centers in Visakhapatnam, India. Railway New Colony name coming from Railway colony. Indian Railways Residential area is located here.

== Localities ==
Neighbouring localities include Kancharapalem, Akkayyapalem, Thatichetlapalem and Dondaparthi.

== Transport ==
Railway New colony is well connected to Gajuwaka, NAD X Road, Gopalapatnam, Dwaraka Nagar, and Asilmetta.

== Education ==
There are many schools and colleges located close to this suburb at Akkayyapalem and Kancharapalem.

== Businesses ==
Sri Kanya Movie Theater and Sri Kanya Hotel are located in this community.
