= HB Colony =

- Neighbourhood
- Location in Visakhapatnam
- Coordinates: 17.745048°N 83.324062°E
- Country: India
- State: Andhra Pradesh
- District: Visakhapatnam

Government
  - Body: Greater Visakhapatnam Municipal Corporation

Languages
  - Official: Telugu
- Time zone: UTC+5:30 (IST)
- PIN: 530022
- Vehicle registration: AP-31

HB Colony is a neighborhood situated on the northern part of Visakhapatnam City, India. The area, which falls under the local administrative limits of Greater Visakhapatnam Municipal Corporation, is one of the residential area in the city.

== History ==
The name of this area came from the Housing Board which established the Residential Colony in this area by Government of Andhra Pradesh in the mid 80's.

== About ==
HB Colony is surrounded by Seethammadhara and Venkojipalem. It is connected with Maddilapalem, Dwaraka Nagar, Jagadamba Centre and One Town (Visakhapatnam).

== Transport ==
APSRTC routes

Route number	Start	End	Via
20A	HB Colony	Old Head Post Office	Seethammadhara, Satyam Junction, Gurudwara, RTC Complex, Jagadamaba Centre, Town Kotharoad
69	Arilova Colony	Railway Station	Pedagadili, Hanumanthuwaka, Venkojipalem, HB Colony, Seethammadhara, Satyam Junction, Gurudwara, RTC Complex
