= Turner's Choultry =

General information
- Type: Bungalow
- Location: Jagadamba Centre, Visakhapatnam; Andhra Pradesh
- Coordinates: 17.708726°N 83.301116°E
- Construction started: 1893
- Completed: 1898
- Cost: ₹ 43,000
- Owner: Andhra Pradesh Endowments Department

Turner's Choultry is a Bungalow located in Jagadamba Centre, Visakhapatnam, India.

== about ==
in the year 1893 Construction of Turner's Choultry started and the total cost of ₹ 43,000 of which ₹ 10,000 paid by Maharaja of Vizianagram, Pusapati Ananda Gajapati Raju, ₹ 10,000 paid by King Goday Narayana Gajapathi Rao and raised by public.

The 19th century sudden growth of Visakhapatnam City because construction of Railway Station and King George Hospital brought to the large number of people to the city so the Rajah of Bobbili made a propose to construct a building for people need as a memorial to late H G Turner former district collector Vizagapatam.
