= LIC Building, Visakhapatnam =

LIC Building
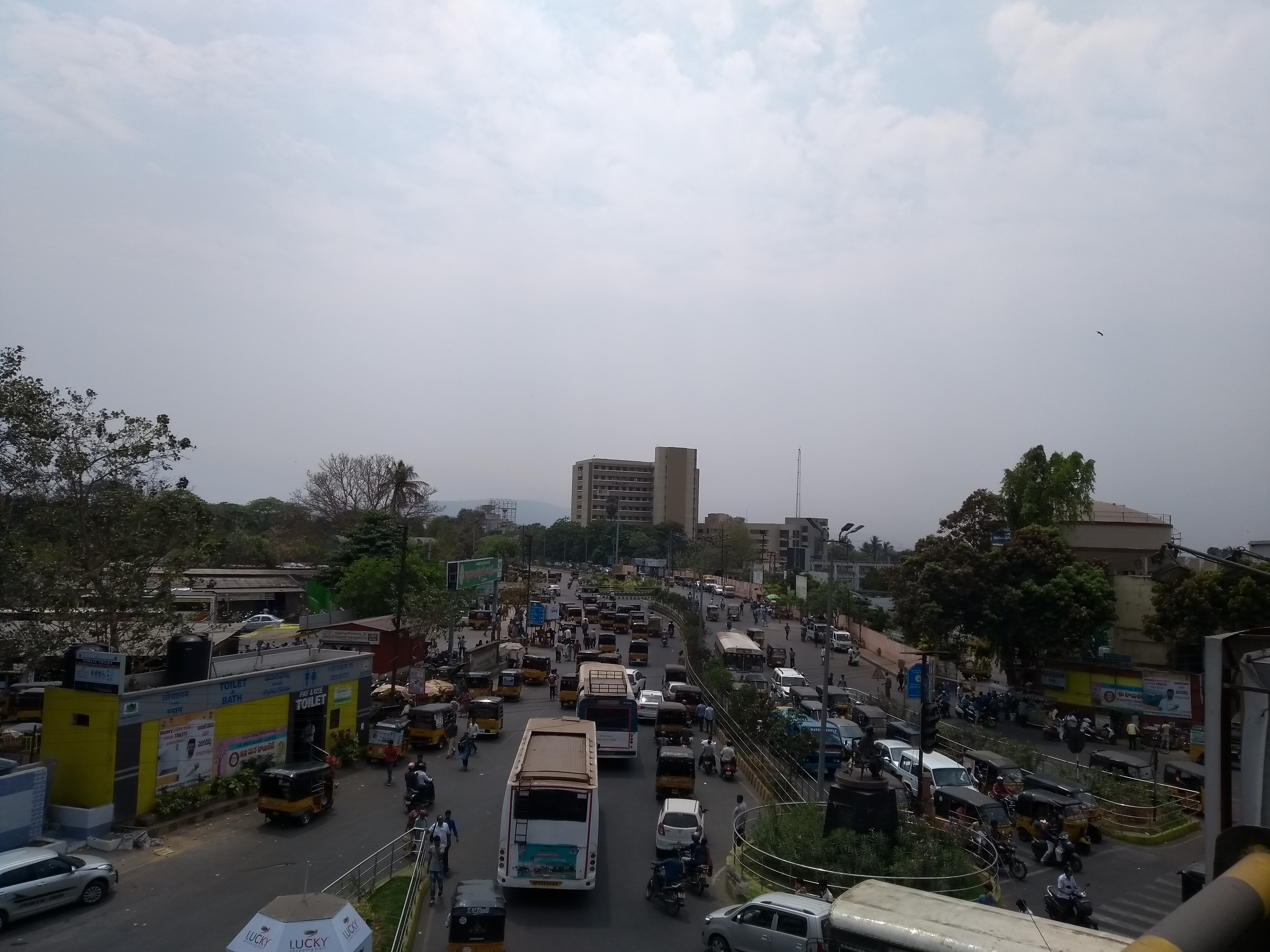
- The LIC building view from Telugu Thalli Flyover
- Interactive map of the LIC Building area

General information
- Type: Commercial offices
- Architectural style: Modernism (RCC-framed construction)
- Location: Dwaraka Nagar, Visakhapatnam, India, PB No.411, Jeevitha Bima Road, Visakhapatnam, Andhra Pradesh 530 004, India
- Coordinates: 17.722624°N 83.303545°E
- Completed: 1970; 56 years ago
- Inaugurated: 1970; 56 years ago
- Owner: Life Insurance Corporation of India

Technical details
- Floor count: 11

LIC Building, Visakhapatnam is an 11-storied commercial building in Visakhapatnam, India. It is located on the Jeevitha Bima Road, opposite to the City Central Park. It was one of the tallest buildings in the city.

== About ==
The LIC Building was one of the first tall structures in Visakhapatnam in the 1970s. At that time, it resembled a light house which was visible from the four corners of the city. Back then, it was a wonder of the city. Many central government offices are located near this building.
