= Ramnagar, Visakhapatnam =

Ramnagar రామ్ నగర్
- Neighbourhood
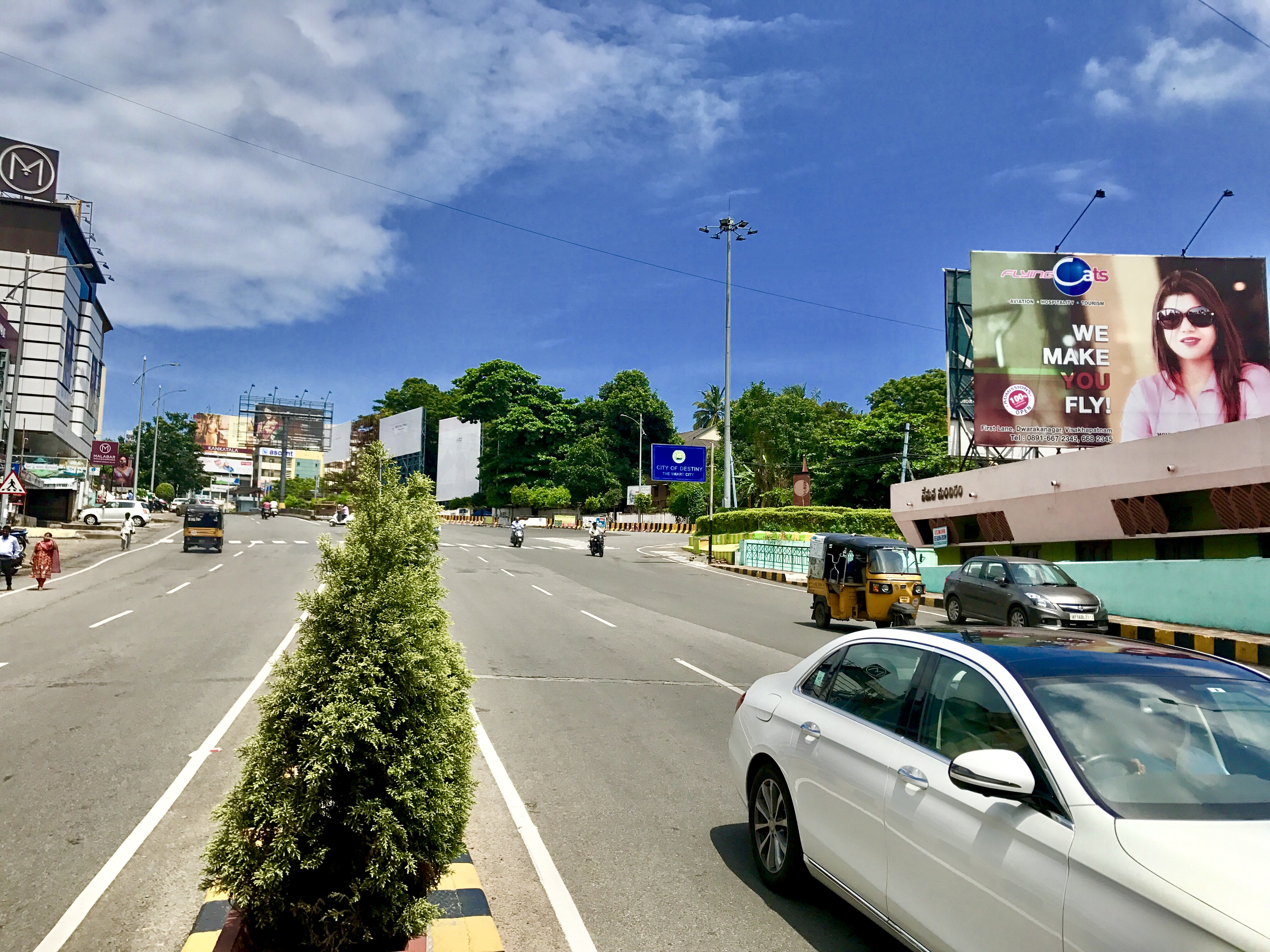
- Ramnagar Road

- Location in Visakhapatnam
- Coordinates: 17.721742°N 83.311652°E
- Country: India
- State: Andhra Pradesh
- District: Visakhapatnam

Government
  - Body: Greater Visakhapatnam Municipal Corporation

Languages
  - Official: Telugu
- Time zone: UTC+5:30 (IST)
- PIN: 530002
- Vehicle registration: AP-31

Ramnagar is a neighborhood situated on the central part of Visakhapatnam City, India. The area, which falls under the local administrative limits of Greater Visakhapatnam Municipal Corporation. Ramnagar is located near Dwaraka Nagar, Asilmetta and Daba Gardens.

== About ==
Ramnagar is one of the more important commercial areas in the city and includes all Greater Visakhapatnam Municipal Corporation Administrative buildings. The waltair main road near Ramnagar has many businesses for clothing, kitchen appliances and utensils, shoes, toys, gifts and merchandise. There are also a few restaurants, hotels, as well as bakeries.

== Hospitals ==
There are many corporate hospitals available here. They are Seven Hills Hospitals, Apollo Heart Centre, Lazarus Hospitals and OMNI RK hospitals.

== Transport ==
Ramnagar is connected with MVP and the old town.

APSRTC routes

Route number	Start	End	Via
14	Venkojipalem	Old Head Post Office	Appughar, Lawsonsbay colony, Pedda waltair Jn, Govt Mental hospital, Chinnawaltair, Vuda park, AU outgate, AU ingate, Siripuram, Governor's bungalow, Ramnagar, Green park, Jagadamba Centre, Turner choultry, Poorna market, Kurpam market, Town Kotharoad
