= Sankara Matam Road =

Road in Visakhapatnam, India

Coordinates: 17.732521°N 83.304122°E

Sankara Matam Road is a major road in the Indian city of Visakhapatnam. The name of the road is derived from a famous Hindu Matam that is located nearby. It is one of the busiest roads that connects to Dwaraka Nagar to Akkayyapalem. this road is commercially well developed.
