= 2026 Greater Visakhapatnam Municipal Corporation election =

Local election in India

- October 2026

All 120 elected seats in the Greater Visakhapatnam Municipal Corporation 61 seats needed for a majority
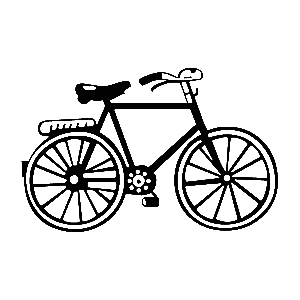

	First party	Second party	Third party
Candidate	Mokka Shravani	Varudu Kalyani
Party	TDP	YSRCP	JSP
	Fourth party	Fifth party	Sixth party
Party	BJP	CPI	CPI(M)
Elected Mayor
TBD

The 2026 Greater Visakhapatnam Municipal Corporation election is scheduled to be held on 28 October 2026 to elect members to all 120 wards of the Greater Visakhapatnam Municipal Corporation.

== Parties and alliances ==
Party/Alliance		Flag	Symbol	Leader	Seats contested
NDA	Telugu Desam Party			N. Chandrababu Naidu	77
NDA	Jana Sena Party			Pawan Kalyan	32
NDA	Bharatiya Janata Party				11
YSR Congress Party				YSR Jagamohan Reddy	
LF	Communist Party of India (Marxist)			V. Srinivasa Rao	14
LF	Communist Party of India			Gujjula Eshwarayya	6
LF	Aam Aadmi Party				4
LF	Independent			B. Ramani	1
