= Visakha Institute of Medical Sciences =

Coordinates: 17.759413°N 83.329723°E

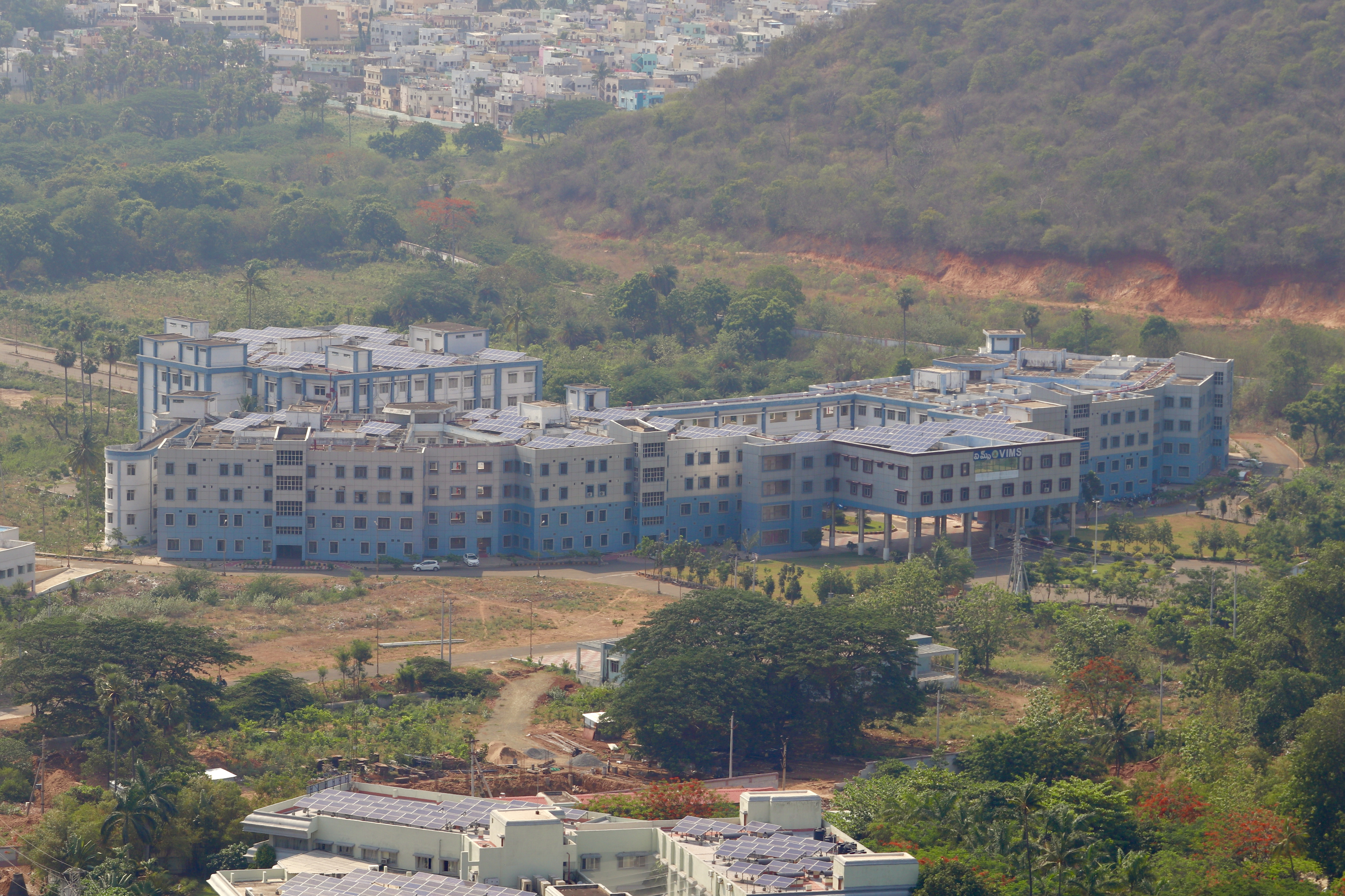
- VIMS as seen from Kailasagiri
- Other name: VIMS Visakhapatnam
- Type: Government
- Established: 2016; 10 years ago
- Affiliations: National Medical Commission
- Academic affiliations: NTR University of Health Sciences
- Director: Dr. V. Manmadharao
- Location: Visakhapatnam, Andhra Pradesh, India
- Campus: Urban
- Website: http://www.vimsvskp.com/

Visakha Institute of Medical Sciences shortly VIMS is a hospital in Visakhapatnam, Andhra Pradesh, India.

== Overview ==
The institute is located in Hanumanthavaka area at the Entrance of the Main City and spread over an area of about 100 acres (400,000 m^{2}).

== See also ==
- King George Hospital, Visakhapatnam
