= Thatichetlapalem =

- Neighbourhood
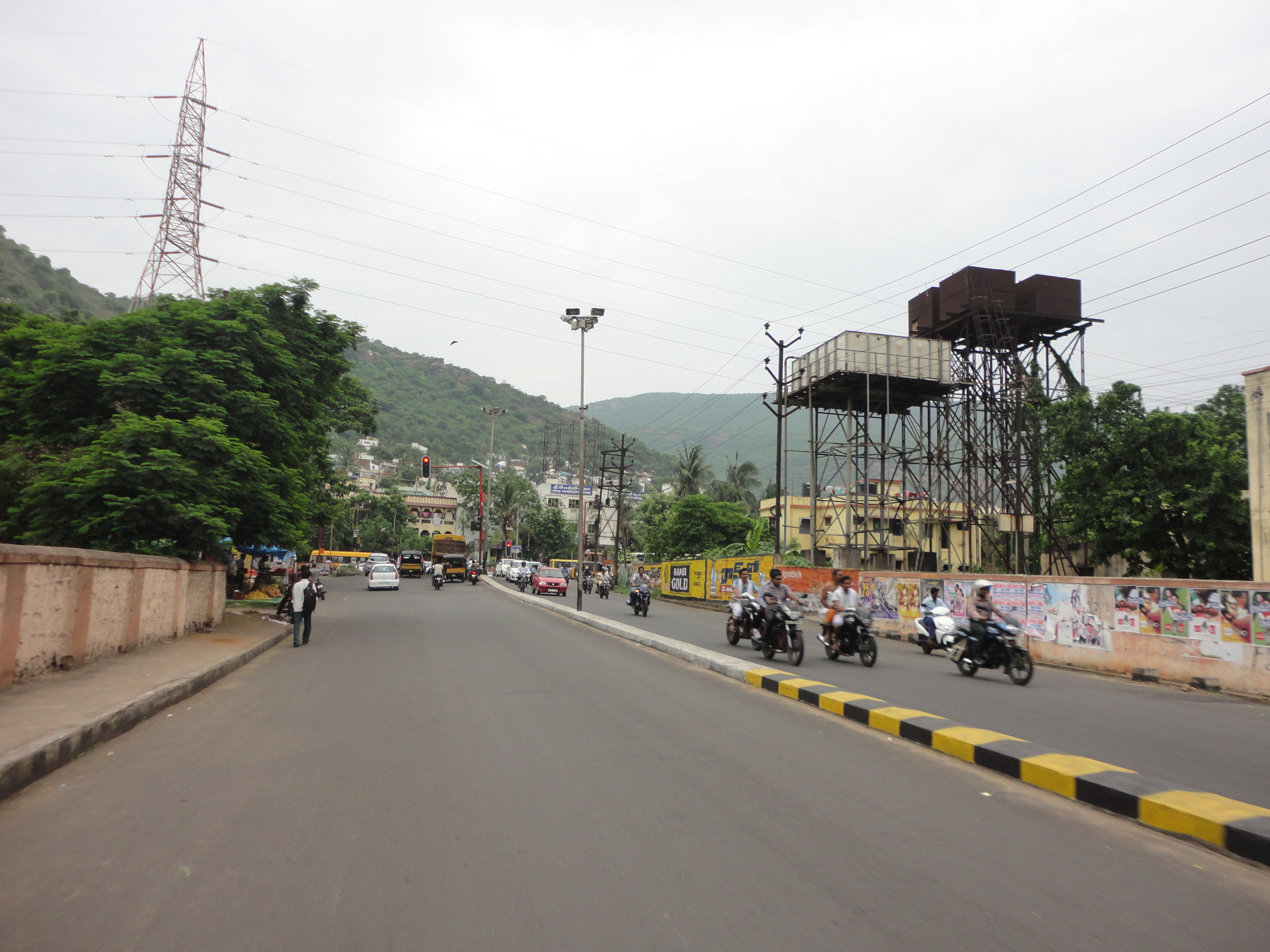
- Tatichatlapalem Railway Road

- Location in Visakhapatnam
- Coordinates: 17.733860°N 83.291153°E
- Country: India
- State: Andhra Pradesh
- District: Visakhapatnam

Government
  - Body: Greater Visakhapatnam Municipal Corporation

Languages
  - Official: Telugu
- Time zone: UTC+5:30 (IST)
- PIN: 530024

Thatichetlapalem is a suburb in Visakhapatnam, India. It is located close to other bigger suburbs such as Akkayyapalem and Kancharapalem.
