= Venkojipalem =

- Neighbourhood
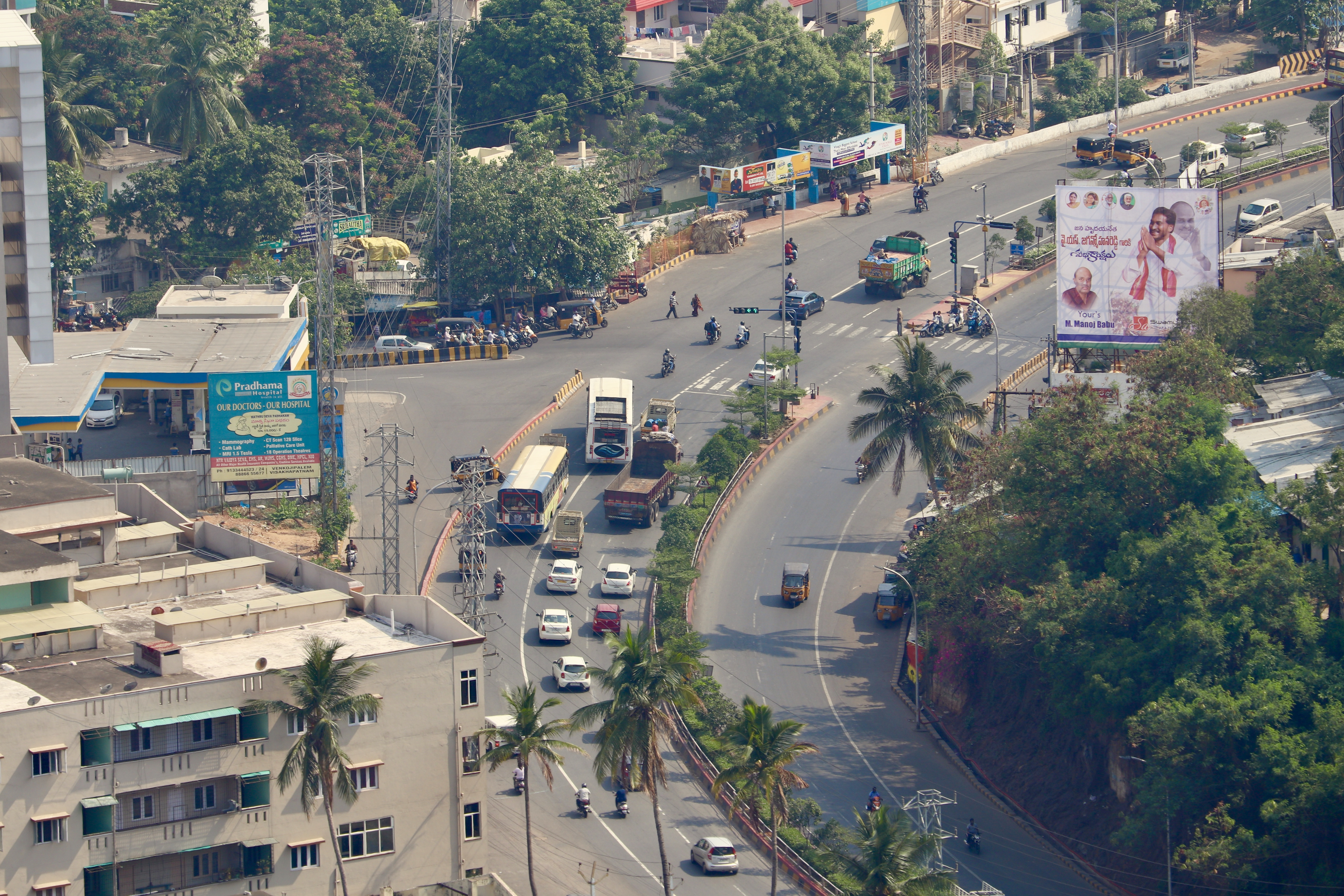
- Venkojipalem junction from Kailasagiri.

- Location in Visakhapatnam
- Coordinates: 17.745550°N 83.328927°E
- Country: India
- State: Andhra Pradesh
- District: Visakhapatnam

Government
  - Body: Greater Visakhapatnam Municipal Corporation

Languages
  - Official: Telugu
- Time zone: UTC+5:30 (IST)
- PIN: 530022
- Vehicle Registration: AP31, AP32, AP33 (Former); AP39 (from 30 January 2019)

Venkojipalem is a locality in Visakhapatanam City in Andhra Pradesh State, India. It belongs to Andhra region. Venkojipalem is divided into New Venkojipalem and Old Venkojipalem.

== Features ==
Durga Nagar (1 km), HB Colony (1 km), Maddilapalem (1 km), Appughar (1 km), and Hanumanthawaka (1 km) are the nearby localities to Venkojipalem.

== Commerce ==
The shopping area is quite old and new can usually fulfill the need of its nearby residents. Shops in the form of free standing rental areas still exist here.

== Transport ==
APSRTC runs the buses to this suburb, connecting it to all parts of the city.

== Education ==
There are a good number of schools and colleges for all budgets.
