= Telugu Thalli Flyover =

Coordinates: 17.725004°N 83.303063°E

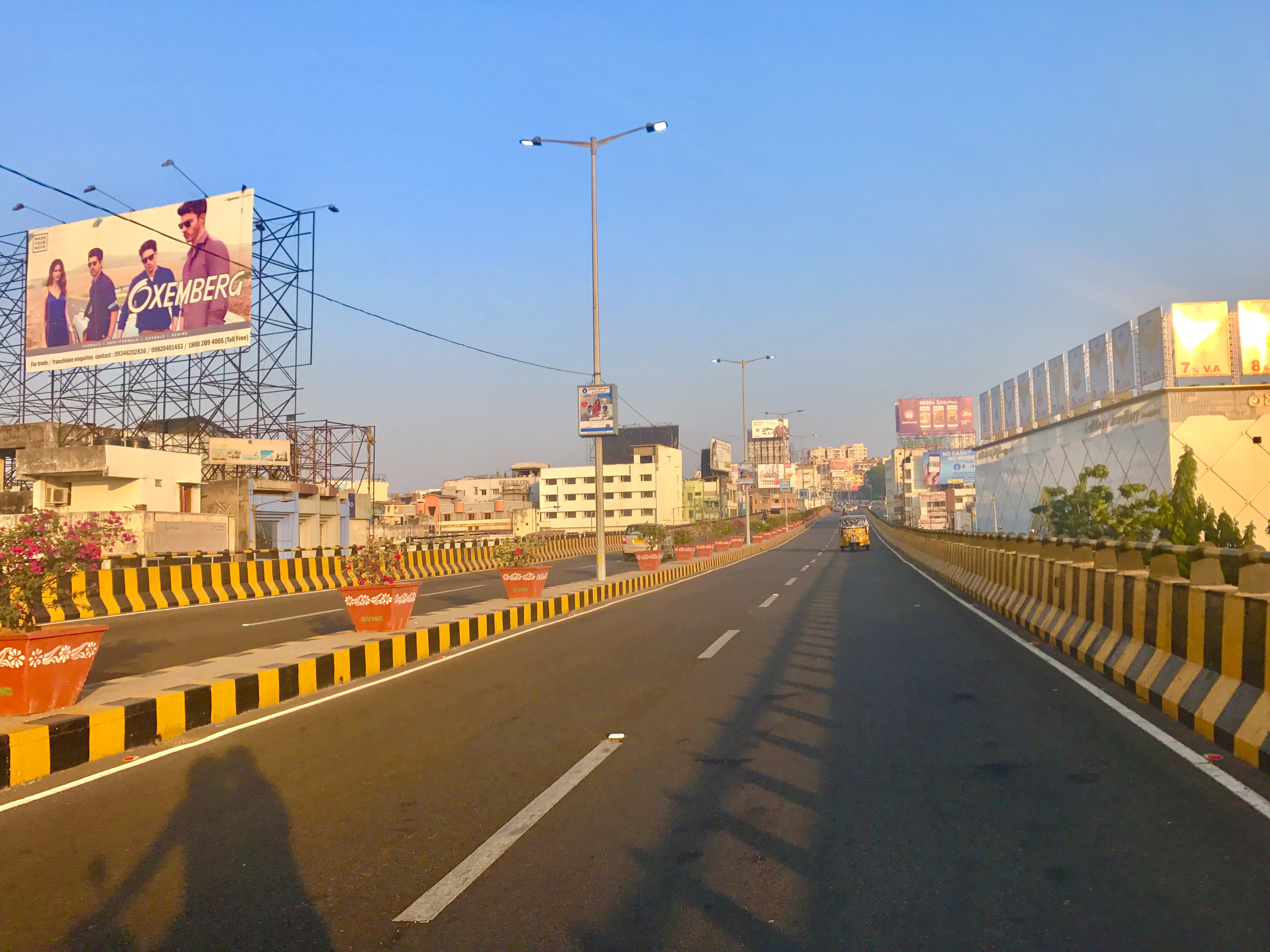
- Telugu Thalli Flyover near Asilmetta
- Interactive map of Telugu Thalli Flyover

Location
- Visakhapatnam, India
- Roads at junction: Dondaparthi Road; Asilmetta Road

Construction
- Type: Flyover
- Lanes: 4
- Opened: 2013

Telugu Thalli Flyover (Asilmetta Flyover) is a flyover in the Indian city of Visakhapatnam. It was opened in the year 2013.
