= N. S. N. Reddy =

Indian politician (died 1991)

- In office 1981

Mayor of Visakhapatnam

Member of the Andhra Pradesh Legislative Assembly
- In office 1978–1983
- Constituency: Visakhapatnam-II

Personal details
- Died: 1991
- Party: Bharatiya Janata Party
- Other political affiliations: Janata Party

N. S. N. Reddy (died 1991) was an Indian politician who was elected mayor of Visakhapatnam in 1981, the first time the Bharatiya Janata Party held a mayoral post in undivided Andhra Pradesh. He had earlier served as a member of the Andhra Pradesh Legislative Assembly from the Visakhapatnam-II constituency from 1978 to 1983, representing the Janata Party.

== Career ==
He contested the 1978 Andhra Pradesh Legislative Assembly election from the Visakhapatnam-II Assembly constituency as a Janata Party candidate and was elected. He later contested the Visakhapatnam municipal election as a Bharatiya Janata Party candidate and became mayor in 1981.

As mayor, he secured funds from the state government for civic works and worked on widening roads and improving drinking-water facilities in the city. The Greater Visakhapatnam Municipal Corporation installed a statue of Reddy in his honour.

Reddy died in 1991.
