= Dr. Y. S. Rajasekhara Reddy Central Park =

Park in Visakhapatnam, India

VUDA City Central Park
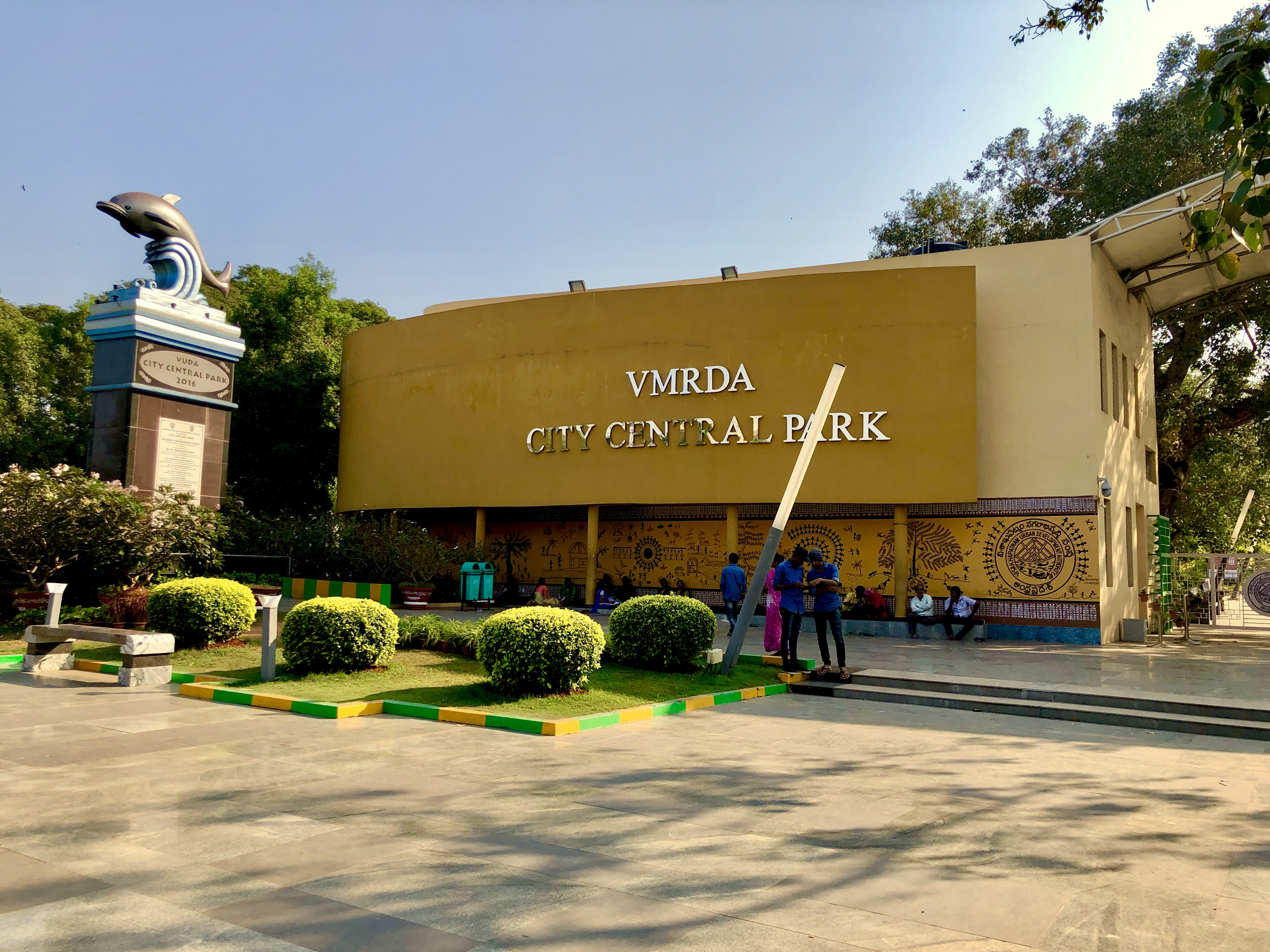
- Main Entrance of The Park
- Interactive map of VUDA City Central Park
- Type: Urban park
- Location: Dwaraka Nagar, Visakhapatnam, India
- Coordinates: 17.721753°N 83.305728°E
- Area: 22 acres (8.9 ha)
- Created: 14 September 2016; 10 years ago
- Operator: Visakhapatnam Metropolitan Region Development Authority
- Open: 6AM-9PM
- Status: Open all year

City Central Park (also known as VMRDA City Central Park) is an urban park located in the heart of Visakhapatnam, Andhra Pradesh, India. Covering an area of 22 acres (8.9 ha), the park was inaugurated by the Chief Minister of Andhra Pradesh, Nara Chandrababu Naidu, on 15 September 2016.

The park features the first musical fountain in the state and serves as a major recreational space for the city's residents and visitors. It is operated and maintained by the Visakhapatnam Metropolitan Region Development Authority (VMRDA).

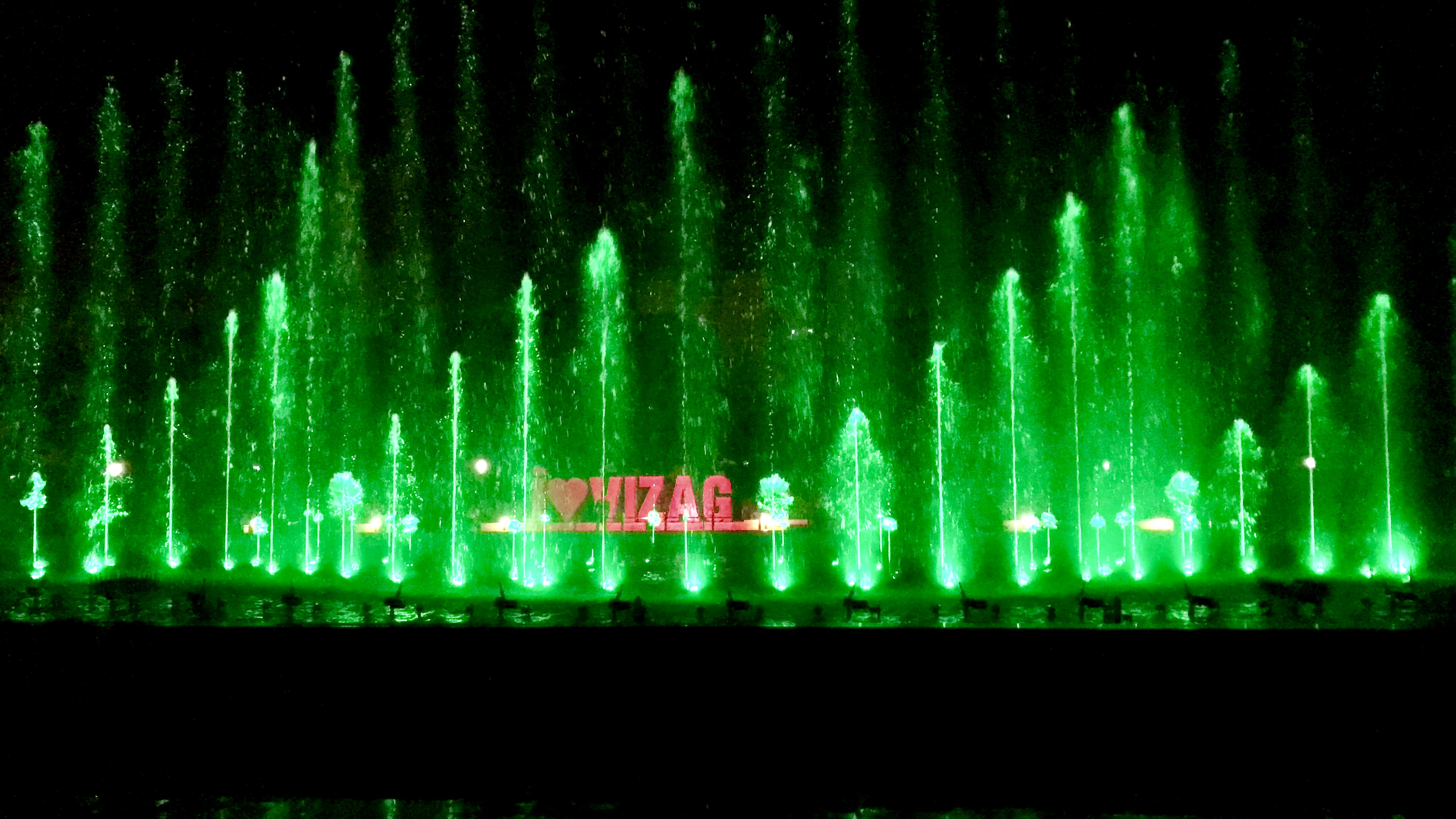
Musical Fountain

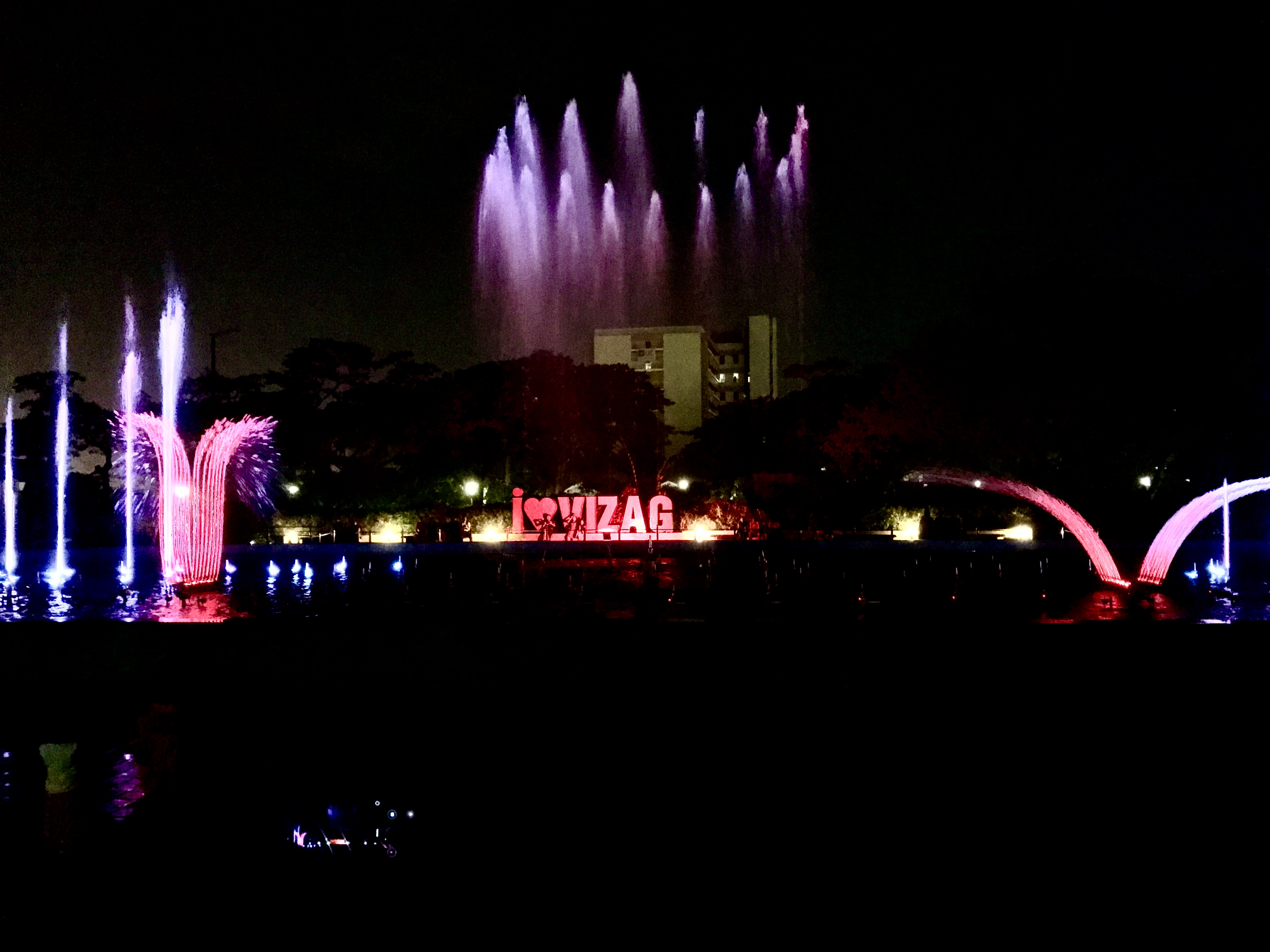
Musical fountain, with the LIC Building in the background.

== See also ==
- Dwaraka Nagar
