= Hanumanthavaka =

Hanumanthawaka
- Neighbourhood
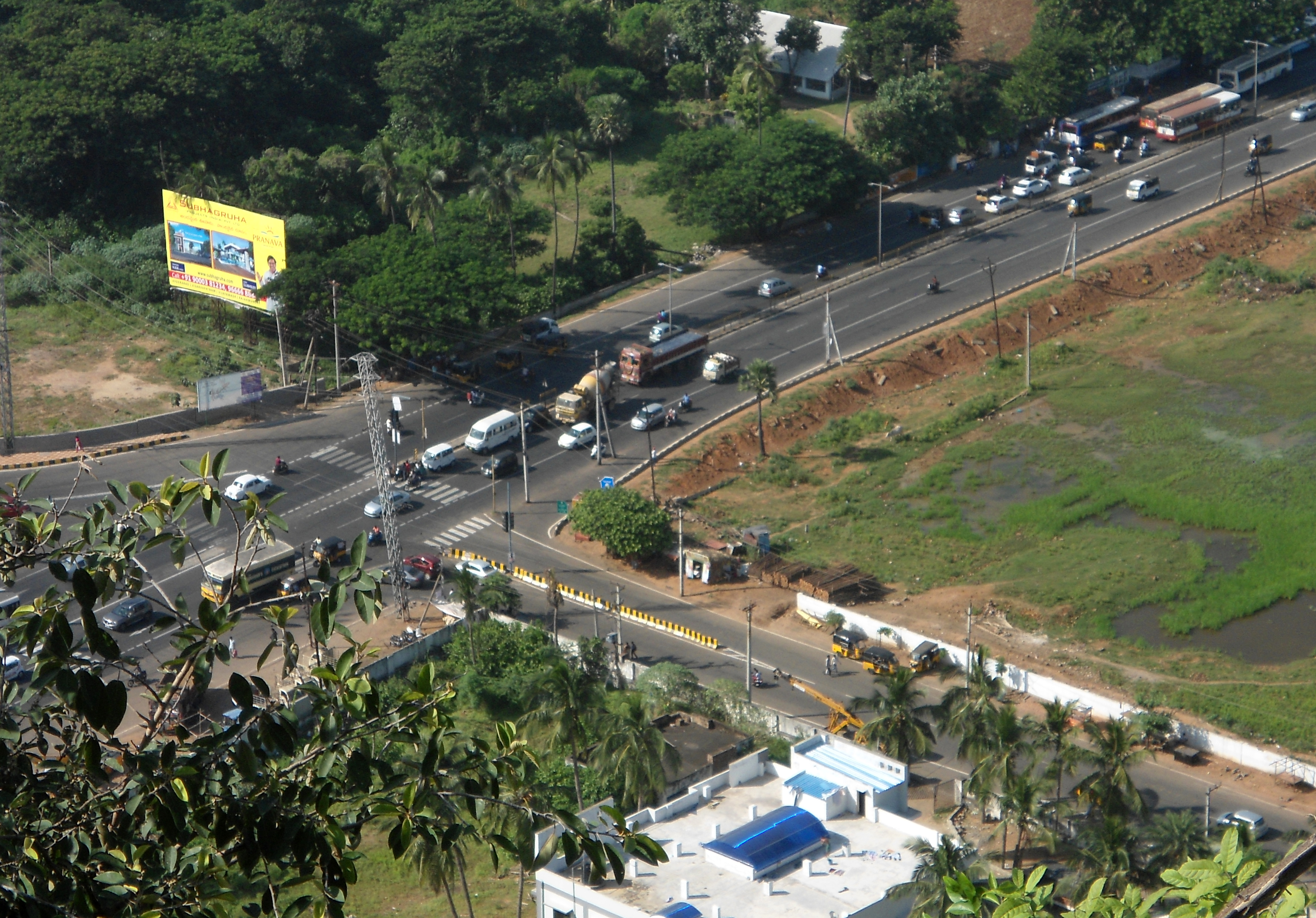
- Hanumanthawaka Junction at noon time

- Location in Visakhapatnam
- Coordinates: 17.760167°N 83.325831°E
- Country: India
- State: Andhra Pradesh
- District: Visakhapatnam

Government
  - Body: Greater Visakhapatnam Municipal Corporation

Languages
  - Official: Telugu
- Time zone: UTC+5:30 (IST)
- PIN: 530040
- Vehicle registration: AP

Hanumanthuwaka is an area of Visakhapatnam, Andhra Pradesh, India. The Visakhapatnam BRTS connects Hanumanthuwaka to Simhachalam. Hanumanthuwaka was an initially a small suburb outside Visakhapatnam.

== Landmark ==
The area is home to the famous tourist spot, Kailasagiri.

== Hospitals ==
Hanumanthuwaka is home to the Visakha Institute of Medical Sciences (VIMS) and a branch of the L.V. Prasad Eye Hospital.

== Transport ==
Hanumanthuwaka is connected by the National Highway. It is one of the busiest junctions in the city as NH 16 passes through here. Buses are run by the state-owned APSRTC, and is well connected to all parts of Visakhapatnam. All buses going to Arilova, Thagarapuvalasa, Bheemili pass through here.
