= Jagadamba Centre =

- Neighbourhood
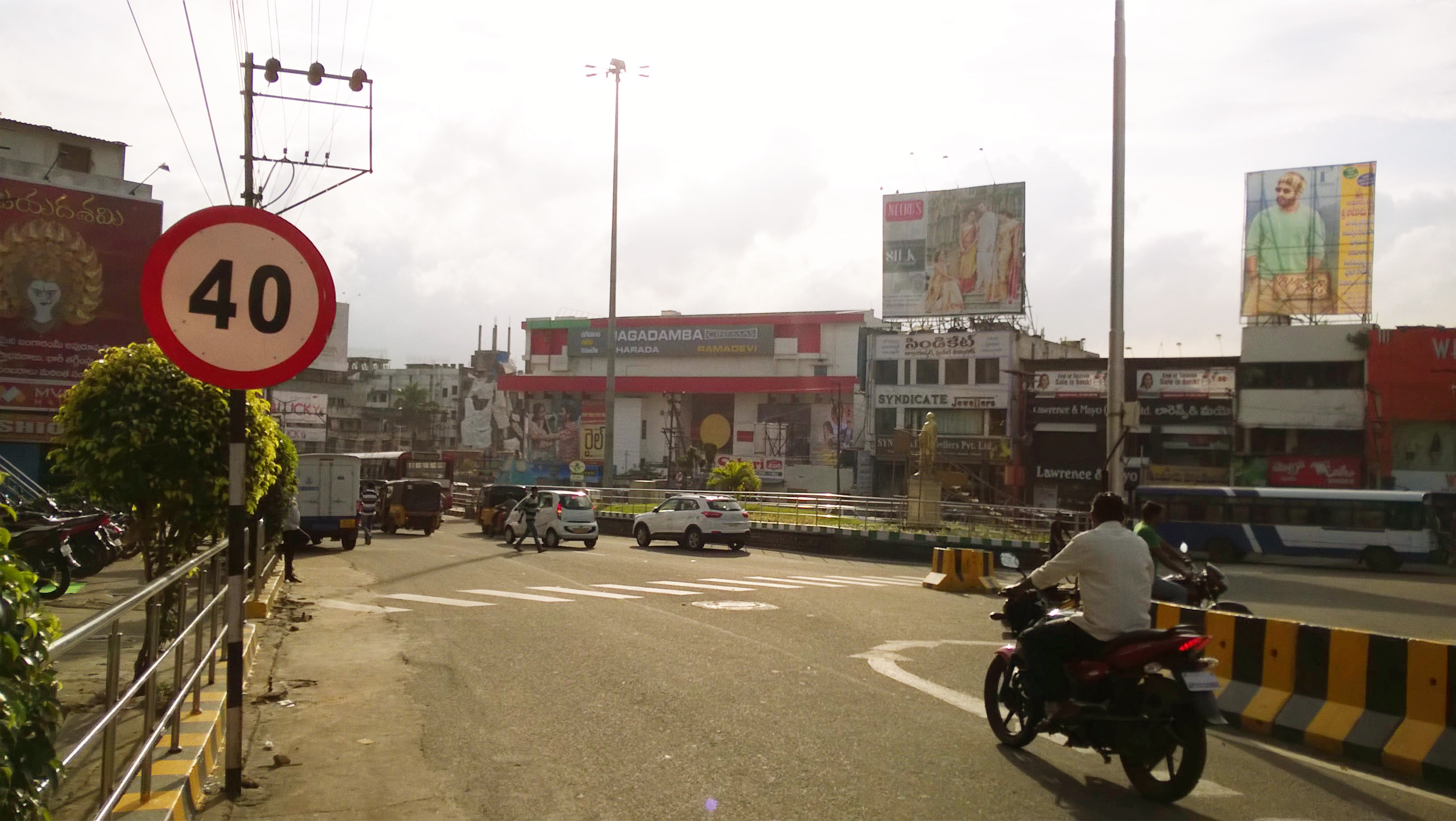
- Jagadamba Junction and Theatre

- Location in Visakhapatnam
- Coordinates: 17.712392°N 83.302987°E
- Country: India
- State: Andhra Pradesh
- District: Visakhapatnam

Government
  - Body: Greater Visakhapatnam Municipal Corporation

Languages
  - Official: Telugu
- Time zone: UTC+5:30 (IST)
- PIN: 530002

Jagadamba Centre gets its name after the Jagadamba Theatre at the central junction of the city of Visakhapatnam. This is the central shopping and entertainment hub of the port city.

== Commerce ==
Tourists can visit this site for exploring various shopping malls and restaurants located in close vicinity.

== Gallery ==
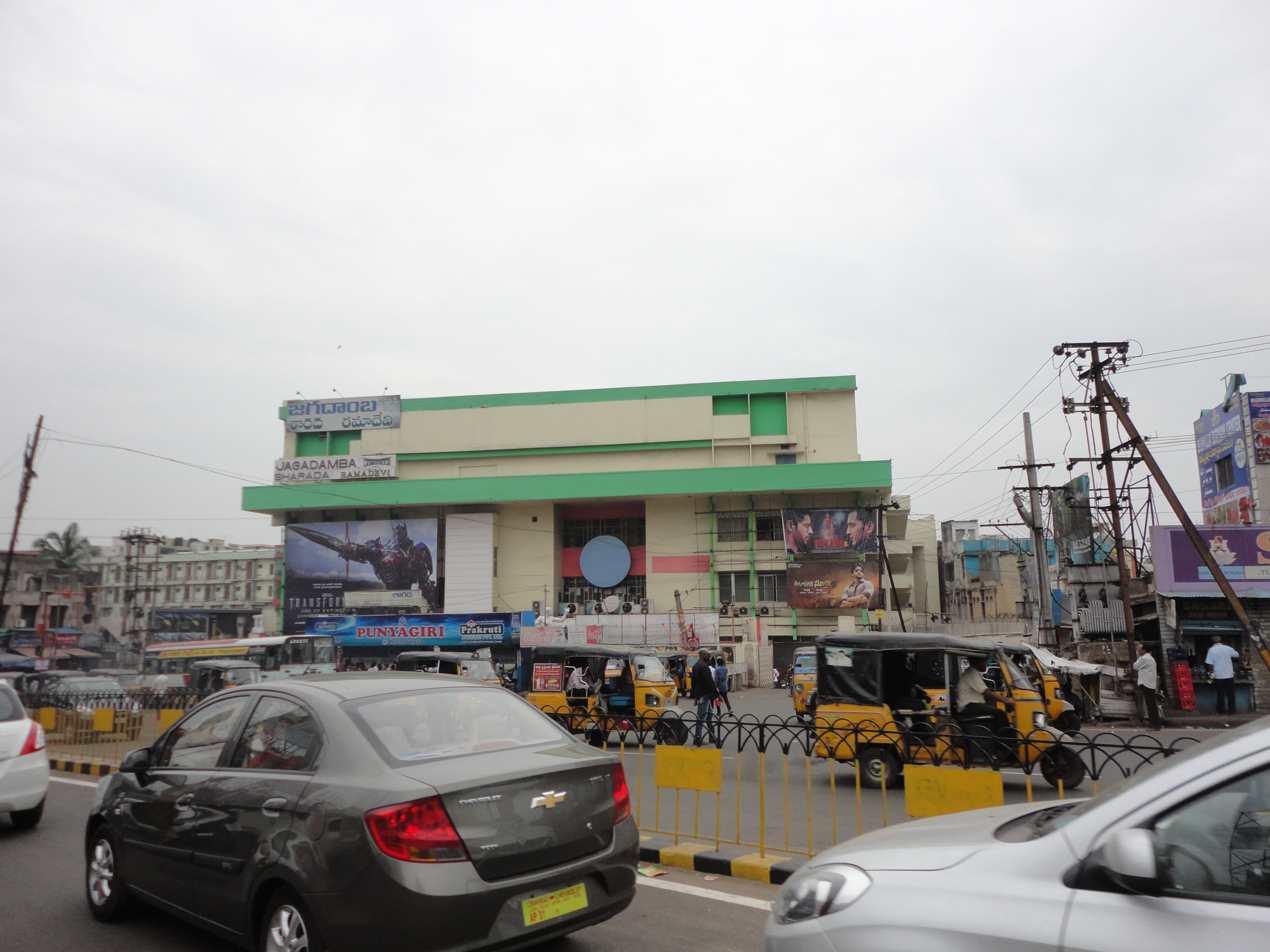
Jagadamba Theatre

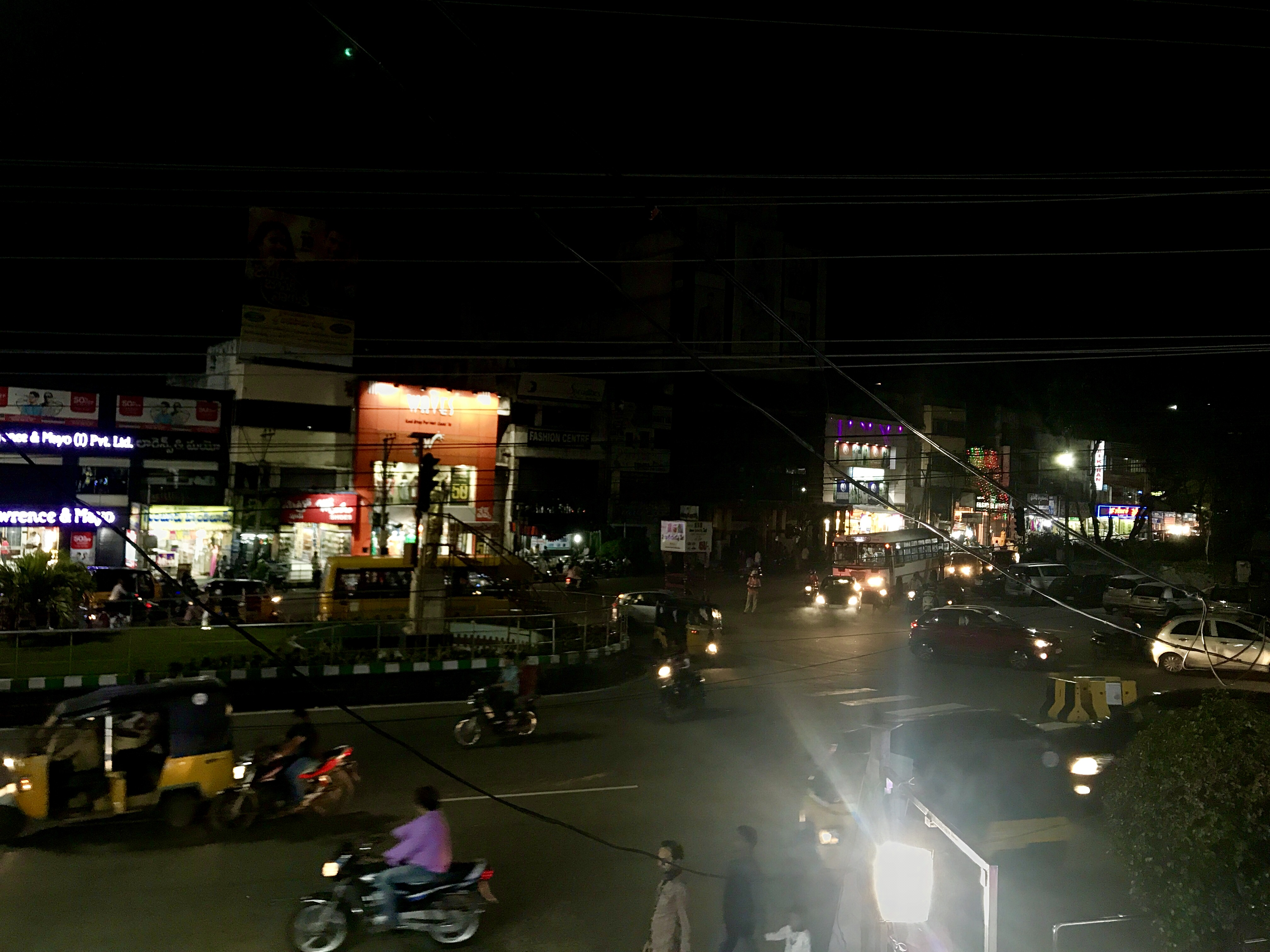
Jagadamba junction at night time.

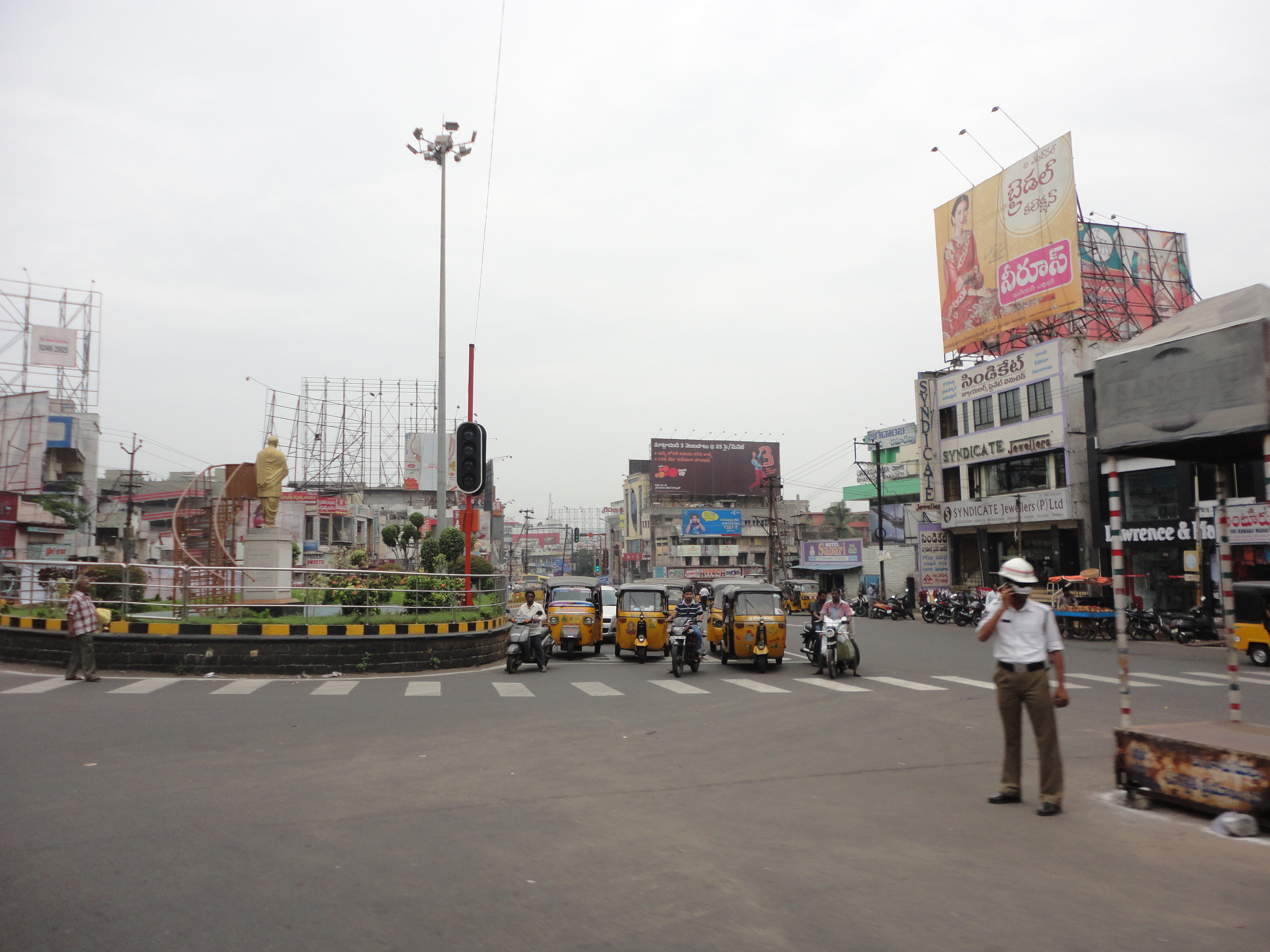
Jagadamba junction
