= Akkayyapalem =

- Neighbourhood
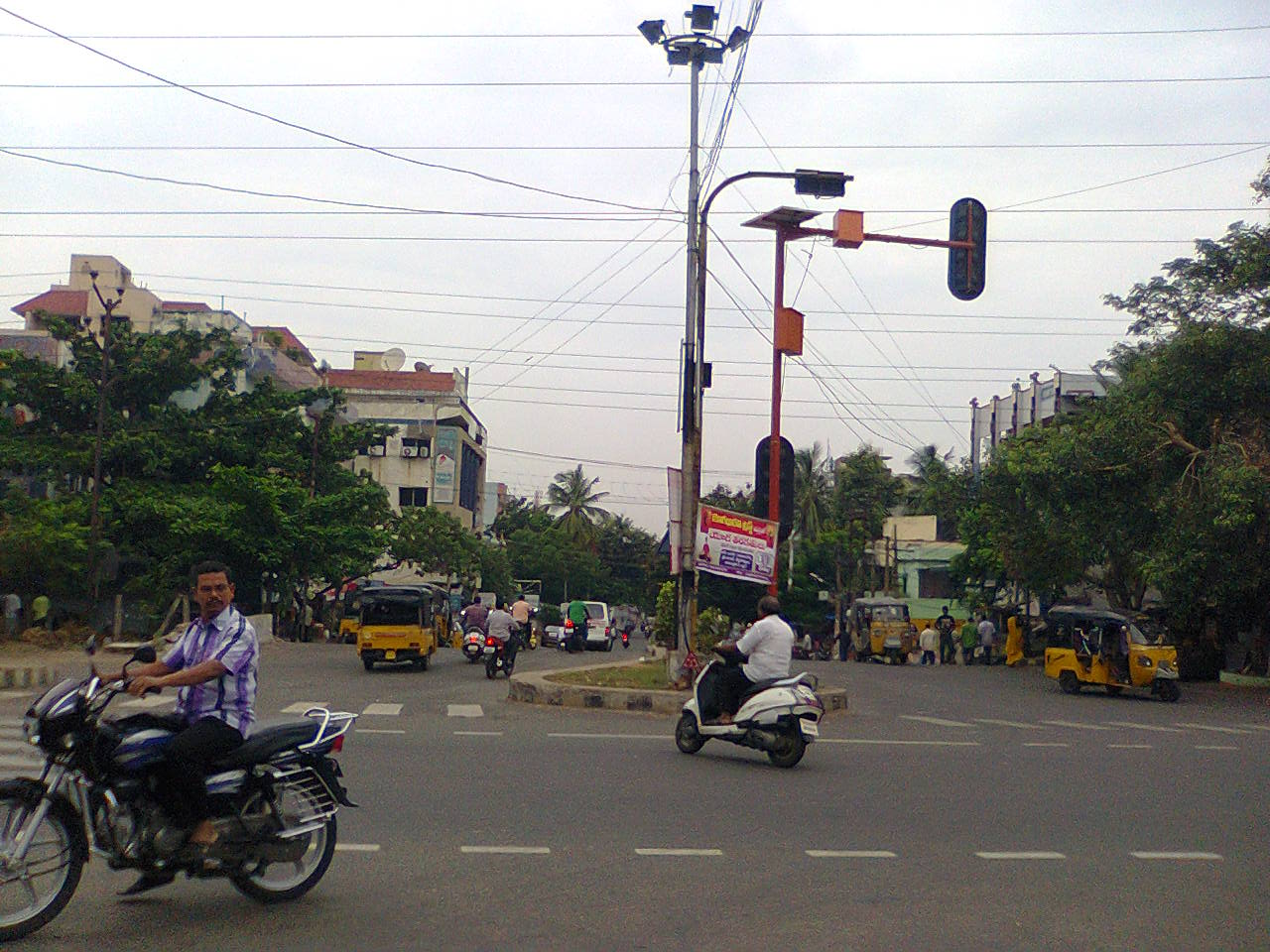
- Akkayyapalem Road

- Location in Visakhapatnam
- Coordinates: 17.739336°N 83.301138°E
- Country: India
- State: Andhra Pradesh
- District: Visakhapatnam

Government
  - Type: Corporation
  - Body: Greater Visakhapatnam Municipal Corporation
- Elevation: 17 m (56 ft)

Languages
  - Official: Telugu
- Time zone: UTC+5:30 (IST)
- PIN: 530016

Akkayyapalem is one of the busiest localities in the city of Visakhapatnam, India. It is a part of Visakhapatnam North Constituency.

== Etymology ==
Akkayyapalem is along Dwaraka Nagar, the arterial road of Visakhapatnam.

== Localities ==
Neighbouring localities include Dwaraka Nagar, Railway New Colony, Dondaparthy, Santhi puram and Tatichetlapalem. Lalithanagar, Nandagiri Nagar, Jagannadhapuram Abidnagar, Kailasapuram and Saligramapuram are important residential areas in Akkayyapalem.

== Transport ==
Akkayyapalem is well connected to Gajuwaka, NAD X Road, Maddilapalem and Pendurthi. APSRTC has buses with route numbers 48, 48A, 38 through the area's bus stop. Local auto rickshaws are also available.

APSRTC routes

Route number	Start	End	Via
48	Madhavadhara	MN Club	Muralinagar, Kailasapuram, Akkayyapalem, RTC Complex, Jagadamba Centre, Town Kotharoad
48A	Madhavadhara	Old Head Post Office	Muralinagar, Kailasapuram, Akkayyapalem, RTC Complex, Dabagardens, Town Kotharoad
38	Gajuwaka	RTC Complex	BHPV, Airport, NAD Kotharoad, Birla Junction, Gurudwar
38K	Kurmannapalem	RTC Complex	Old Gajuwaka, BHPV, Airport, NAD Kotharoad, Birla Junction, Gurudwar
38H	Gantyada HB Colony	RTC Complex	Pedagantyada, New Gajuwaka, Old Gajuwaka, BHPV, Airport, NAD Kotharoad, Birla Junction, Gurudwar
38T	Steel Plant	RTC Complex	Kurmannapalem, Old Gajuwaka, BHPV, Airport, NAD Kotharoad, Birla Junction, Gurudwar
38D	Nadupuru	RTC Complex	Pedagantyada, New Gajuwaka, Old Gajuwaka, BHPV, Airport, NAD Kotharoad, Birla Junction, Gurudwar
38J	Janata Colony	RTC Complex	Sriharipuram, New Gajuwaka, Old Gajuwaka, BHPV, Airport, NAD Kotharoad, Birla Junction, Gurudwar
38Y	Duvvada Railway Station	RTC Complex	Kurmannaplem, Old Gajuwaka, BHPV, Airport, NAD Kotharoad, Birla Junction, Gurudwar
540	Simhachalam	MVP Colony	Gopalapatnam, NAD Kotharoad, Birla Junction, Gurudwar, RTC Complex
541	Kothavalasa	Maddilapalem	Gopalapatnam, NAD Kotharoad, Birla Junction, Gurudwar, RTC Complex
28Z/H	Simhachalam Hills	Zilla Parishad	Gopalapatnam, NAD Kotharoad, Birla Junction, Gurudwar, RTC Complex, Jagadamba
