= Asilmetta =

Neighbourhood in Andhra Pradesh, India

- Neighbourhood
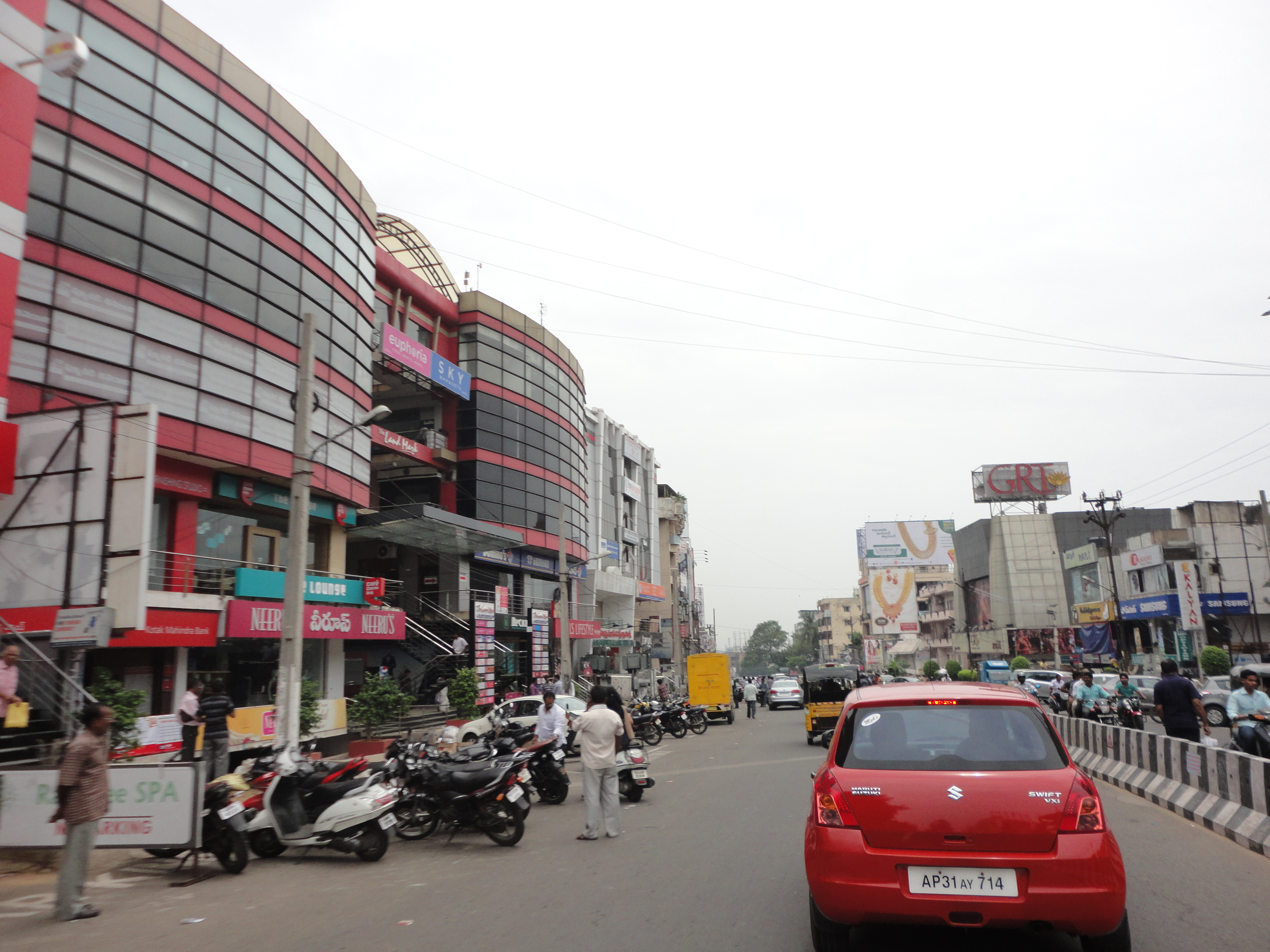
- Commercial Road of Asilmetta

- Location Visakhapatnam
- Coordinates: 17.727738°N 83.312366°E
- Country: India
- State: Andhra Pradesh
- District: Visakhapatnam

Government
  - Body: Greater Visakhapatnam Municipal Corporation

Languages
  - Official: Telugu
- Time zone: UTC+5:30 (IST)
- PIN: 530003

Asilmetta ("Asella Metta") is a neighborhood in Visakhapatnam, Andhra Pradesh, India. In the olden days, the government collected taxes (''Asellu'' in Telugu) in this area, hence the name.

== Commerce ==
Pictured is one of the busiest commercial areas in Visakhapatnam City. It is a hub for many shopping malls, food courts, and restaurants, as well as educational institutes. The Sampath Vinayagar Temple is also located here.area.

== Transport ==
APSRTC bus network provides ready access to any part of the city; the Dwaraka Bus Station is very close to this area.

== Gallery ==
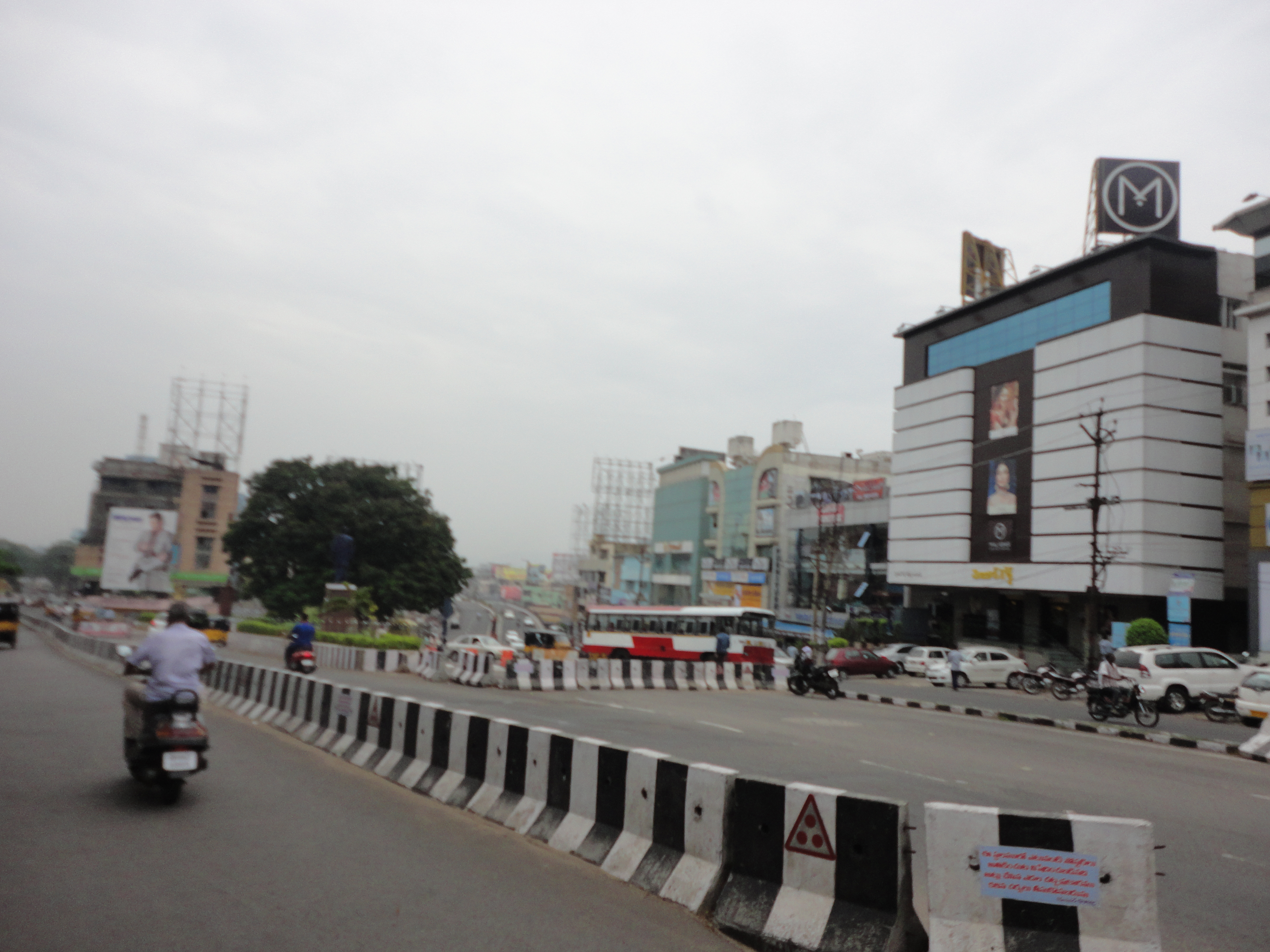
Asilmetta Road

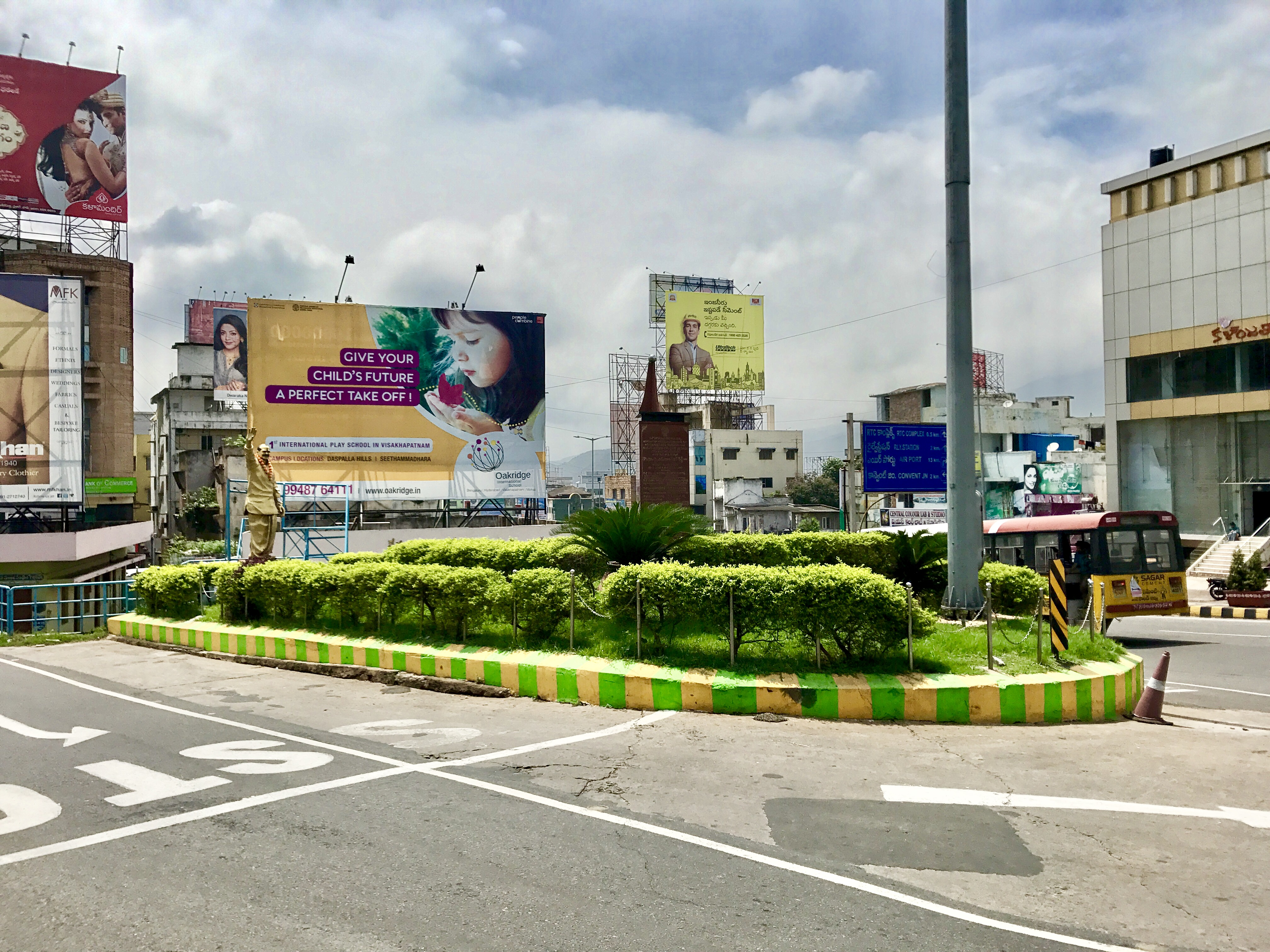
A road near Asilmetta

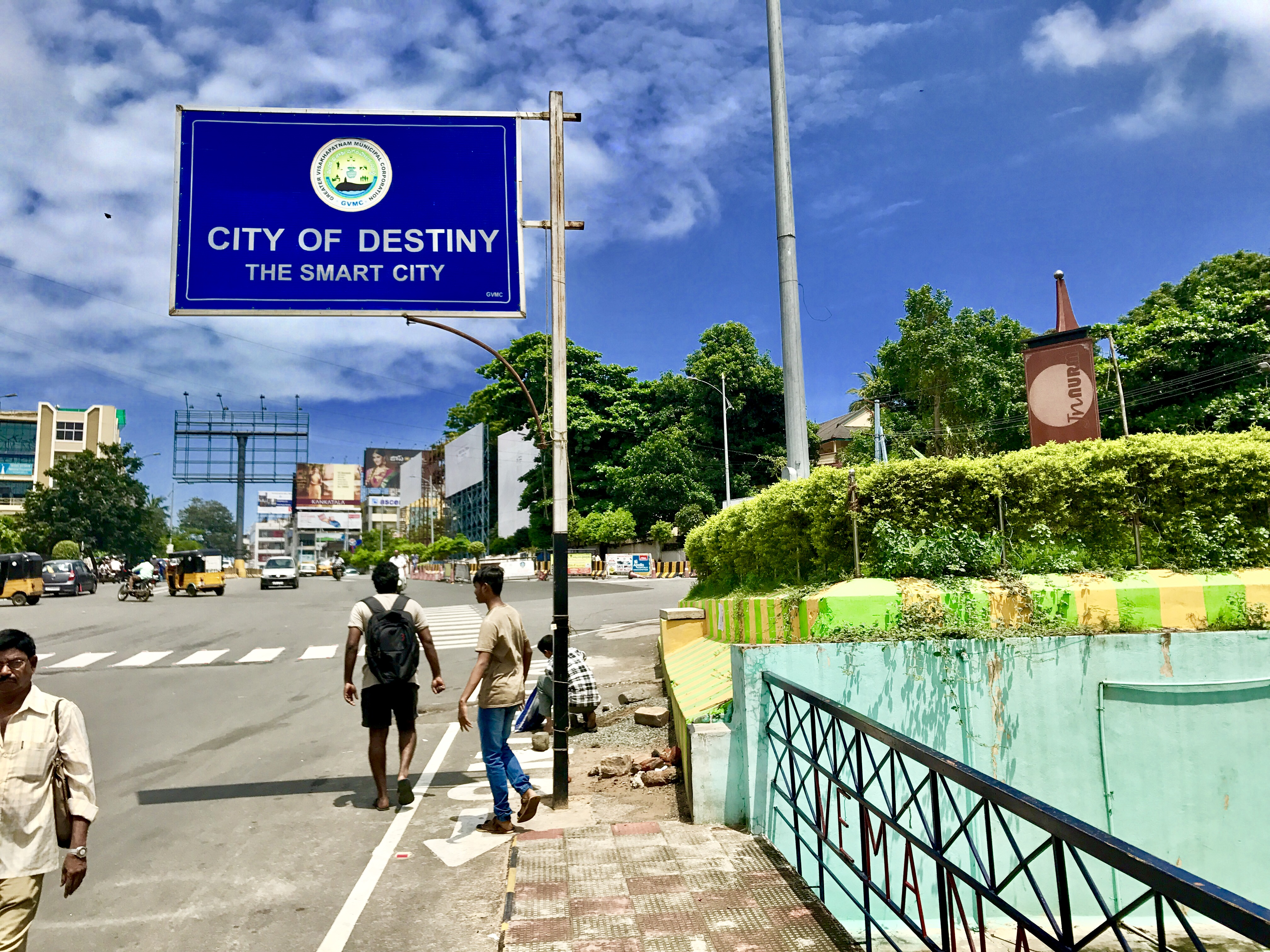
City of Destiny board near Asilmetta

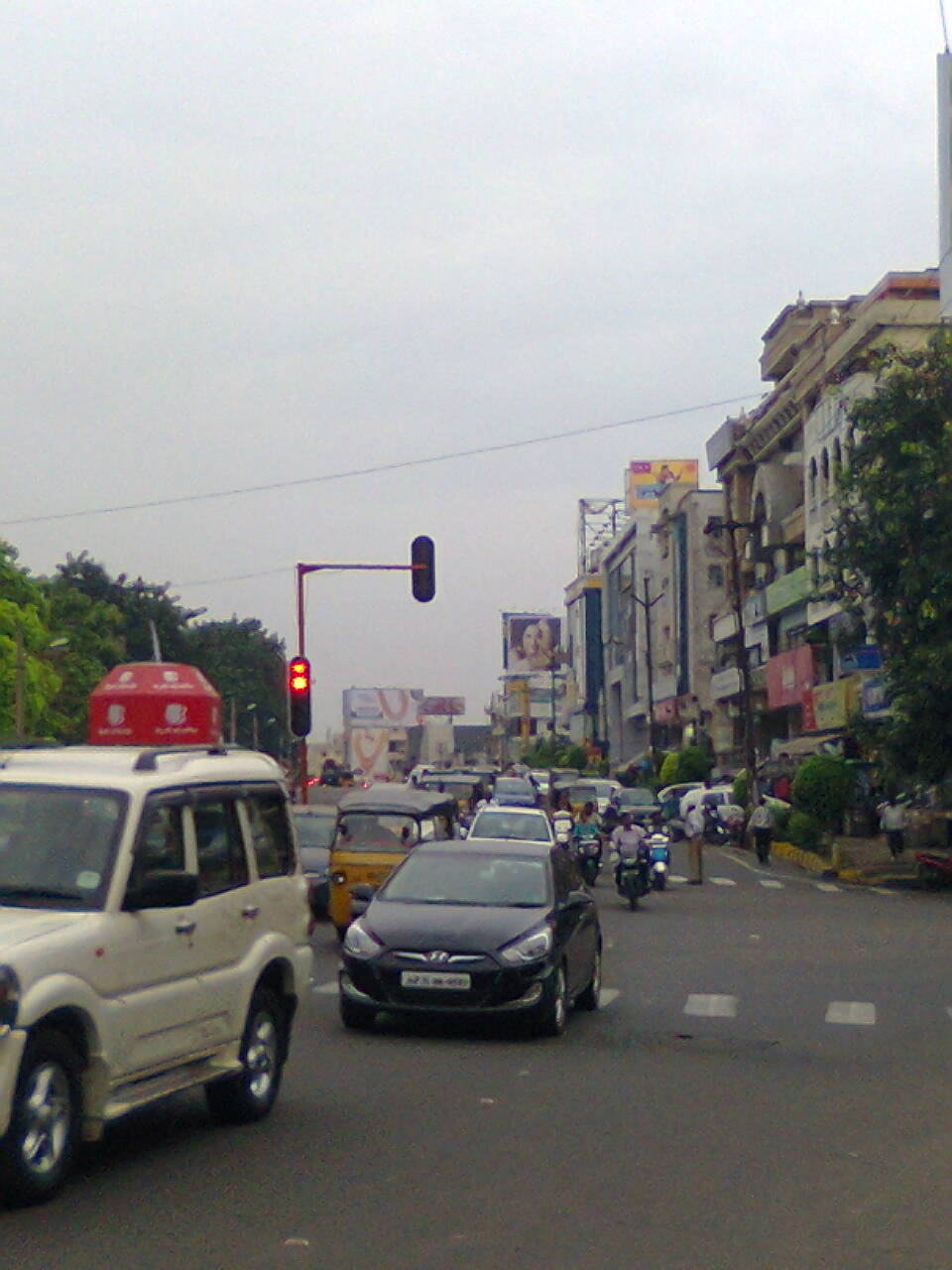
Asimetta road

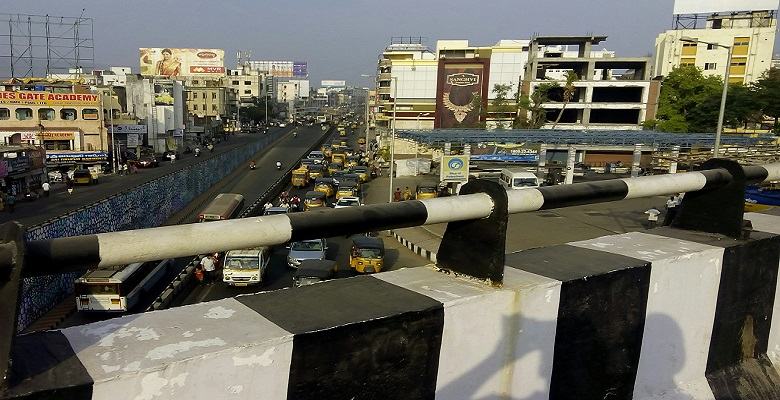
View from Asilmetta Flyover
