= Greater Visakhapatnam Municipal Corporation =

Local civic body in Visakhapatnam, Andhra Pradesh, India

Greater Visakhapatnam Municipal Corporation Greater Viśākhapaṭṇa Nagara Pālaka Saṃstha

Type
- Type: Municipal Corporation

History
- Founded: 1979 (47 years ago)

Leadership
- Mayor: Mukka Sravani, TDP
- Deputy mayor: Vacant
- Municipal commissioner: Ketan Garg, IAS

Structure
- Seats: 120 wards
- Political groups: Government (98) Kutami (98): TDP (64); JSP (26); BJP (8); Opposition (22): YSRCP (13); CPI(M) (1); IND (8)

Elections
- Last election: 1 November 2026
- Next election: 2031

Motto
- City of Destiny

Meeting place
- Tenneti Bhavan, Ramnagar, Visakhapatnam

Website
- Official website

The Greater Visakhapatnam Municipal Corporation (GVMC) is the civic body that governs Visakhapatnam, the largest city of the Indian state of Andhra Pradesh. Its jurisdiction encompasses an area of 640 square kilometres (250 sq mi). It is also part of the planning body of the Visakhapatnam Metropolitan Region Development Authority. Established in the year 1979, the executive power of the GVMC is vested in the Municipal Commissioner, an Indian Administrative Service officer appointed by the Government of Andhra Pradesh. In January 2021, the number of wards were increased to 98 from 81 earlier. On 28 April 2025, Peela Srinivasa Rao from 96th ward of GVMC elected as new mayor of Visakhapatnam after no-confidence motion on previous mayor has successfully passed in the council.

== History ==
Visakhapatnam is one of the earliest municipalities in the southern region of India. It was first established as a municipality in 1858, later established as a corporation in 1979. On 21 November 2005 Government of Andhra Pradesh released a Government Order to form a Greater Municipal Corporation with the merger of Gajuwaka Municipality and 32 other Gram Panchayats. In the year 2005 it was officially declared as Greater Visakhapatnam Municipal Corporation, and it was the first Greater municipal corporation in the state of Andhra Pradesh. Subsequently in 2017 the Anakapalli and the Bheemili municipalities were incorporated into GVMC raising the wards from 72 to 81 according to the 2011 census.

== Administration and about ==
Greater Visakhapatnam Municipal Corporation

The area of Greater Visakhapatnam Municipal Corporation is 681.96 km^{2} (263.31 mi^{2}) spread across Visakhapatnam and Anakapalli districts. The corporation is administered by an elected body headed by the mayor.

== List of mayors ==
| Sno. | Mayor | DY Mayor | Portrait | Term start | Term end | Duration | Party | Notes | Ref. |
| Visakhapatnam Municipal Corporation (VMC) | | | | | | | | | |
|---|---|---|---|---|---|---|---|---|---|
| 1. | N.S.N.Reddy | | | 1981 | 1986 | 5 years | Bharatiya Janata Party | First mayor of VMC | |
Elections not held (1986 - 1987)
| 2. | D. V. Subba Rao | | | 1987 | 1992 | 5 years | Telugu Desam Party | | |
Elections not held (1992 - 1995)
| 3. | Sabbam Hari | | | 1995 | 2000 | 5 years | Indian National Congress | | |
| 4. | Rajana Ramani | | | 2000 | 2005 | 5 years | Indian National Congress | First women mayor of VMC | |
Greater Visakhapatnam Municipal Corporation (GVMC)
Elections not held (2005 - 2007)
| 1. | P.Janardhan | K.Dorababu | | 2007 | 2012 | 5 years | Indian National Congress | First mayor of GVMC | |
Elections not held (2012 - 2021)
| 2. | Golagani Hari Venkata Kumari | J.Sridhar; K.Satheesh | | 2021 | April 2025 | 4 years | YSR Congress Party | First women mayor of GVMC | |
| 3. | Peela Srinivasa Rao | JSP (D.Govindareddy) | | April 2025 | | | Telugu Desam Party | | |

== Wards ==
| Zone | Ward Number | Ward Name | Areas Covered | Assembly Constituency | Councillor Name and Address | Political Group |
|---|---|---|---|---|---|---|
| Bheemunipatnam Zone | 1 | | | | SMT. AKKARAMANI PADMA, D.NO.7-42-160/1 SANGIVALASA, BHEEMILI, VISAKHAPATNAM. | YSRCP |
| Bheemunipatnam Zone | 2 | | | | SMT. GADU CHINNI KUMARI LAKSHMI, D.NO.12-21-43/2, KALIGOTLAVARI VEEDHI, CHINNABAZAR, BHEEMILI, VSP. | TDP |
| Bheemunipatnam Zone | 3 | | | | SMT. GANTA APPALAKONDA D.NO14-15-295, YEGUVAPETA, BHEEMILI, VISAKHAPATNAM. | TDP |
| Bheemunipatnam Zone | 4 | | | | SRI DOWLAPALLI YEDUKONDALA RAO, D.NO.2-138, PEDDA UPPADA, CHEPALUPPADA POST, BHEEMILI, VISAKHAPATNAM. | YSRCP |
| Madhurawada Zone | 5 | | | Bheemunipatnam Assembly Constituency | SMT.MOLLI HEMALATHA D.NO.24-124, MAINROAD, BOTTAVANIPALEM, VISAKHAPATNAM-48 | TDP |
| Madhurawada Zone | 6 | | | Bheemunipatnam Assembly Constituency | SMT.MUTTHAMSETTI PRIYANKA D.NO. 13-27-25, NEAR BUS STOP, BHEEMILI, VISAKHAPATNAM. | YSRCP |
| Madhurawada Zone | 7 | | | Bheemunipatnam Assembly Constituency | SMT.PILLA MANGAMMA D.NO: 1-159/B/1, PILAKAVANIPALEM, NEAR WATER TANK, MADHURAWADA, VISAKHAPATNAM | TDP |
| Madhurawada Zone | 8 | | | Bheemunipatnam Assembly Constituency | SRI LODAGALA APPA RAO, D.NO 5-116, GOLLALAYENDADA, NEAR MASHIDH, VISAKHAPATNAM | YSRCP |
| East Zone | 9 | | | Visakhapatnam East Assembly Constituency | SMT. KORUKONDA VENKATA RATNA SWATHI, D.NO. 1-149, JODUGULLAPALEM, VISALAKSHINAGAR, VISAKHAPATNAM, | YSRCP |
| East Zone | 10 | | | Visakhapatnam East Assembly Constituency | SMT. MADDELA RAMA LAKSHMI, D.NO 5-217, VIVEKANANDA NAGAR, OLD DAIRY FARM, VSP. | TDP |
| East Zone | 11 | | | Visakhapatnam East Assembly Constituency | SMT.GOLAGANI HARI VENKATA KUMARI, D.NO.18-97, PEDAGADILI, NEAR SIVALAYAM TEMPLE ARILAOVA, VISAKHAPATNAM- 530040. | YSRCP |
| East Zone | 12 | | | Visakhapatnam East Assembly Constituency | SMT.AKKARAMANI ROHINI, D.NO.7-42-122/6, SANGIVALASA(V), CHITTIVALASA POST, BHEEMILI, VISAKHAPATNAM. | YSRCP |
| East Zone | 13 | | | Visakhapatnam East Assembly Constituency | SMT.KELLA SUNITHA, D.NO.16-164/1, PANDU RANGA PURAM, ARILOVA COLONY, VISAKHAPATNAM- 530040 | YSRCP |
| North Zone | 14 | | | Visakhapatnam North Assembly Constituency | SRI KATARI ANIL KUMAR RAJU, FLAT NO:301, IIIRD FLOOR, MK’S KODANDARAMAYYA ENCLAVE, MADHURA NAGAR, VISAKHAPATNAM-16 | YSRCP |
| East Zone | 15 | | | Visakhapatnam East Assembly Constituency | SMT. APPARI SRIVIDYA, D.NO.55-16-29, HB COLONY POST OFFICE LANE, VISAKHAPATNAM-22 | INDEPE N DENT |
| East Zone | 16 | | | Visakhapatnam East Assembly Constituency | SMT. MOLLI LAKSHMI D.NO. 53-32-1, KRM COLONY, SEETHAMMADAHRA, VISAKHAPATNAM- 530012. | YSRCP |
| East Zone | 17 | | | Visakhapatnam East Assembly Constituency | SMT.GEDALA(BANTUBILLI) LAVANYA D.NO. 4-20-14/1, DALAI VARI STREET, PEDA WALTAIR, VISAKHAPATNAM-17. | YSRCP |
| East Zone | 18 | | | Visakhapatnam East Assembly Constituency | SMT.GOLAGANI MANGAVENI D.NO.2-4-13, SECTOR-9, MVP COLONY VSP-530017. | TDP |
| East Zone | 19 | | | Visakhapatnam East Assembly Constituency | SMT. NOLLI NOOKARATNA D.NO.5-1-128, WALTAIR DEPO, PEDAJALARIPETA, VSP- 530017. | TDP |
| East Zone | 20 | | | Visakhapatnam East Assembly Constituency | SMT. NAKKELLA LAKSHMI D.NO.10-31-174/1, GOLLALAPALEM, BHEMUNIPATNMA-531163 | YSRCP |
| East Zone | 21 | | | Visakhapatnam East Assembly Constituency | SRI CHENNUBOINA VAMSI KRISHNA SRINIVAS, D.NO. 9-7-40/7/2, LAXMI NAGAR LAYOUT, SIVAJIPALEM, VISAKHAPATNAM. | YSRCP |
| East Zone | 22 | | | Visakhapatnam East Assembly Constituency | SRI PEETHALA L.V. NARAYANA MURTHY, D.NO. 9-5-53/2/1, PEETHALA VANI PALEM, SIVAJIPALEM, VISAKHAPATNAM. | JANA - SEN A |
| East Zone | 23 | | | Visakhapatnam East Assembly Constituency | SRI GUDLA VIJAYA SAI D.NO.53-6-41, MADDILAPALEM, VISAKHAPATNAM. | YSRCP |
| North Zone | 24 | | | Visakhapatnam North Assembly Constituency | SMT.SADI PADMAVATHI (PADMA REDDY), D.NO. 51-2-3/12, NAKAVANIPALEM, VISAKHAPATNAM. | YSRCP |
| North Zone | 25 | | | Visakhapatnam North Assembly Constituency | SRI SARIPALLI GOVINDA RAJULA VENKATA APPARAO, D.NO. 50-81-65, SEETHAMPETA MAIN ROAD, VISAKHAPATNAM, | YSRCP |
| North Zone | 26 | | | Visakhapatnam North Assembly Constituency | SMT.MUKKA SRAVANI D.NO.49-32-12/2, RAMA KRISHNA NAGAR, AKKAYAPALEM, VISAKHAPATNAM | TDP |
| South Zone | 27 | | | Visakhapatnam South Assembly Constituency | SRI GOLAGANI VEERA RAO D.NO. 48-2-17, SRINAGAR, VISAKHAPATNAM. | TDP |
| East Zone | 28 | | | Visakhapatnam East Assembly Constituency | SMT.PALLA APPALAKONDA D.NO.10-11-33/1, RAM NAGAR BAJAR DOWN, VISAKHAPATNAM, | YSRCP |
| South Zone | 29 | | | Visakhapatnam South Assembly Constituency | SRI VURIKITI NARAYANARAO D.NO.14-10-5, RAMAJOGIPETA, MAHARANIPETA, VISAKHAPATNAM | YSRCP |
| South Zone | 30 | | | Visakhapatnam South Assembly Constituency | SMT.KODURU APPALARATNA D.NO.18-55-3/2, THADI VEEDI, MAHARANIPETA, VISAKHAPATNAM. | YSRCP |
| South Zone | 31 | | | Visakhapatnam South Assembly Constituency | SRI J BIPIN KUMAR JAIN D.NO 9-12-24/9, SAI SREE SADAN, 4TH FLOOR, VIP ROAD, CBM COMPOUND, VISAKHAPATNAM. | YSRC P |
| South Zone | 32 | | | Visakhapatnam South Assembly Constituency | SRI KANDULA NAGARAJU D.NO. 33-4-6, KNR VILLA, ALLIPURAM, VISAKHAPATNAM-4 | INDEPE N DENT |
| South Zone | 33 | | | Visakhapatnam South Assembly Constituency | SMT.BEESETTI VASANTHA LAKSHMI, D.NO.31- 34-93, BANGARAMMA METTA, ALLIPURAM, VISAKHAPATNAM. | JANASE N A |
| South Zone | 34 | | | Visakhapatnam South Assembly Constituency | SMT.THOTA PADMAVATHI D.NO:31-31-5, SAI BABA STREET, DABAGARDENS, VSP- 530020 | YSRCP |
| South Zone | 35 | | | Visakhapatnam South Assembly Constituency | SRI VILLURI BASKAR RAO D.N.8-42-16, THAMILA VEEDHI, CHINNA WALTAIR, VISAKHAPATNAM- 530017 | INDEPE N DENT |
| South Zone | 36 | | | Visakhapatnam South Assembly Constituency | SMT.MASIPOGU MARRY JONES D.NO.19-24-5, RANGIREEJU VEEDHI, POORNA MARKET, VSP-530001. | YSRCP |
| South Zone | 37 | | | Visakhapatnam South Assembly Constituency | SRI CHENNA JANAKI RAM D.NO.20-51-4 AVN COLLEGE ROAD DOWN RELLI STREET, VSP. | YSRCP |
| South Zone | 38 | | | Visakhapatnam South Assembly Constituency | SMT.GODI VIJAYA LAKSHMI D.NO.25-8-7/1 VASANTHARAO VARI VEEDHI SKML TEMPLE, VSP. | TDP |
| South Zone | 39 | | | Visakhapatnam South Assembly Constituency | SRI MOHAMMED SADIQ D.NO.24-49-39 AMBUSARANG STREET, OLD POST OFFICE, VSP 530001 | INDEPE N DENT |
| West Zone | 40 | | | Visakhapatnam West Assembly Constituency | SRI GUNDAPU NAGESWARA RAO D.NO.71-48-97 AKASC COLONY MALAKAPURAM VISAKHAPATNAM. | YSRCP |
| South Zone | 41 | | | Visakhapatnam South Assembly Constituency | SMT.KODIGUDLA POORNIMA D.NO.34-10-37, DAYAS STREET GNANAPURAM, VISAKHAPATNAM. | TDP |
| North Zone | 42 | | | Visakhapatnam North Assembly Constituency | SMT. ALLA LEELAVATHI D.NO.44-5-14/2, GANESH STREET, THATICHETLAPALEM, VISAKHAPATNAM | YSRCP |
| North Zone | 43 | | | Visakhapatnam North Assembly Constituency | SMT.PEDDISETTY USHA SREE D.NO.44-39-16 NANDAGIRI NAGAR, VISAKHAPATNAM- 16. | YSRCP |
| North Zone | 44 | | | Visakhapatnam North Assembly Constituency | SRI BANALA SATYA SURYA SRINIVASA RAO, D.NO. 44-34-30/5 NANDAGIRI NAGAR AKKAYYAPALEM, VSP-16 | YSRCP |
| North Zone | 45 | | | Visakhapatnam North Assembly Constituency | SRI KAMPA HANOKU, D.NO. 9-6-75/9 PENT HOUSE, ANAND RESIDENCY, VSP- 17 | YSR CP |
| North Zone | 46 | | | Visakhapatnam North Assembly Constituency | SRI KATUMURI SATISH D.NO. 49-54-4/2E, HIGHPLACE APTS, BS LAYOUT, 4TH TOWN POLICE STATION, SEETHAMMADHARA, VSP - 13 | YSRCP |
| North Zone | 47 | | | Visakhapatnam North Assembly Constituency | SMT.KANTIPAMU KAMESWARI D.NO.36-94-277/7, ARUNDATI NAGAR, KANCHARAPALEM, VSP - 8 | YSRCP |
| North Zone | 48 | | | Visakhapatnam North Assembly Constituency | SMT.GANKALA KAVITHA D.NO. 36-93-81/A, INDIRA NAGAR, KANCHARA PALEM, VSP - 8 | BJP |
| North Zone | 49 | | | Visakhapatnam North Assembly Constituency | SMT.ALLU SANKARA RAO D.NO.37-11-65/3, GROUNDFLOOR-4, VIGNESWARA APARTMENT - 1, PR GARDENS, GVMC WARD NO 49, VISAKHAPATNAM - 530007 | YSRCP |
| North Zone | 50 | | | Visakhapatnam North Assembly Constituency | SRI VAVILAPALLI PRASAD D.NO. 39-16-58, MADHAVADHARA, INDUSTRIAL ESTATE POST, VISAKHAPATNAM – 530007 | YSRCP |
| North Zone | 51 | | | Visakhapatnam North Assembly Constituency | SRI REYYI VENKATA RAMANA D.NO.39-30-7, GANDHI NAGAR, MARRIPALEM, MADHAVADHARA AREA, VISAKHAPATNAM – 530018 | YSRCP |
| West Zone | 52 | | | Visakhapatnam West Assembly Constituency | SRI JIYYANI SRIDHAR D.NO.8-15-92/7, SANTHI NAGAR, NAD POST, VISAKHAPATNAM-530009 | YSRCP |
| North Zone | 53 | | | | SRI BARKAT ALI D.No.38-30-123/39, G.N. MANSON, FLATNO- 508, ALLIPURAM, MARRIPALEM, VISAKHAPATNAM. | YSRCP |
| North Zone | 54 | | | | SMT.CHALLA RAJINI D.No.38-39-29/1, BAPUJI NAGAR, 104 AREA, VISAKHAPATNAM-530007 | YSRCP |
| North Zone | 55 | | | | SMT.KARAJADA VENKATA NAGA SASIKALA, D.No.49-53-10/9(17), NANDINI APARTMENT, B.S. LAYOUT, VISAKHAPATNAM-530013. | YSRCP |
| West Zone | 56 | | | Visakhapatnam West Assembly Constituency | SRI SARAGADAM RAJA SEKHAR, D.NO.35-18-15, GAVARA KANCHARAPALEM, VISAKHAPATNAM - 530008 | TDP |
| West Zone | 57 | | | Visakhapatnam West Assembly Constituency | SMT.MURRU VANI D.No.57-25-5/6, TUMMADA PALEM, KANCHARAPALEM, VISAKHAPATNAM. | YSRCP |
| West Zone | 58 | | | Visakhapatnam West Assembly Constituency | SMT.GULIGINTHALA LAVANYA D.No. 64-20-14, SRIHARIPURAM MALKAPURAM POST VISAKHAPATNAM. | YSRCP |
| West Zone | 59 | | | Visakhapatnam West Assembly Constituency | SMT.PURRE POORNA SRI D.No.65-4-419, SANTHIGIRI COLONY, GAJUWAKA BUS DEPOT, VISAKHAPATNAM | YSRCP |
| West Zone | 60 | | | Visakhapatnam West Assembly Constituency | SRI PINDI VENKATA SURESH D.No.60-33-84/1, AMBEDKAR COLONY, MALKAPURAM, VISAKHAPATNAM-530011 | YSRCP |
| West Zone | 61 | | | Visakhapatnam West Assembly Constituency | SRI KONATALA SUDHA D.No.61-4-49/3, BODDALA APTS, RAMAKRISHNAPURAM, MALKAPURAM, VISAKHAPATNAM-530011 | YSRCP |
| West Zone | 62 | | | Visakhapatnam West Assembly Constituency | SRI BALLA LAKSHMANA RAO D.No.71-31-407, TRINADHAPURAM MALKAPURAM, VSP-530011 | YSRCP |
| West Zone | 63 | | | Visakhapatnam West Assembly Constituency | SRI GALLA POLIPALLI D.No. 71-31-1160/1, CHINTALALOVA, GANDHIGRAM, VISAKHAPATNAM-530005 | TDP |
| Gajuwaka Zone | 64 | | | Gujuwaka Assembly Constituency | SRI DALLI GOVINDA RAJU D.No.17-1-2/2, PEDAGANTYADA, VISAKHAPATNAM | JANA- SENA |
| Gajuwaka Zone | 65 | | | Gujuwaka Assembly Constituency | SRI BODDU NARASIMHA PATRUDU, D.No.22-116-41/5, DAYAL NAGAR, PEDAGANTYADA, VISAKHAPATNAM. | YSRCP |
| Gajuwaka Zone | 66 | | | Gujuwaka Assembly Constituency | SRI IMRAN MOHAMMED D.No. 12-45-2/1, FATHIMA STREET, BC ROAD, NEW GAJUWAKA, Visakhapatnam. | YSRCP |
| Gajuwaka Zone | 67 | | | Gujuwaka Assembly Constituency | SRI PALLA SRINIVASA RAO, D.No.9-8-117/1, Gandhi Nagar, Gajuwaka, VSP,26 | TDP |
| Gajuwaka Zone | 68 | | | Gujuwaka Assembly Constituency | SMT.GUNDAPU VENKATA SAI ANUSHA, D.No. 2-25-17, Mindhi, BHPV, VSP-12 | YSRCP |
| Gajuwaka Zone | 69 | | | Gujuwaka Assembly Constituency | SRI KAKI GOVINDA REDDY, D.No.5-16-60/1, Santoshi Matha Street, Tunglam, BHPV, VSP-12 | TDP |
| Gajuwaka Zone | 70 | | | Gujuwaka Assembly Constituency | SRI URUKUTI RAMACHANDRARAO S/O, APPARAO URUKUTI, D.NO:8-13-17/1, GOKUL NAGAR, OLD GAJUWAKA, VISAKHAPATNAM-530026. | YSRCP |
| Gajuwaka Zone | 71 | | | Gujuwaka Assembly Constituency | SRI RAJANA RAMA RAO D.No.26-9-36, CHINA GANTAYADA, SC COLONY GAJUWAKA VIZAG -26 | YSRCP |
| Gajuwaka Zone | 72 | | | Gujuwaka Assembly Constituency | SRI APPARI JOSEPH STALIN, S/O SURYANARAYAN MURTHY (LATE), D.No.26-30-4, CHAITANYANAGAR, GAJUWAKA, VISAKHAPATNAM – 530026 | CPI |
| Gajuwaka Zone | 73 | | | Gujuwaka Assembly Constituency | SMT.BHUPATHIRAJU SUJATHA D.No.24-81-5/1, SANATHNAGAR, NEAR SLOKA SCHOOL, GAJUWAKA VISAKHAPATNAM.-530026. | YSRCP |
| Gajuwaka Zone | 74 | | | Gujuwaka Assembly Constituency | SRI TIPPALA VAMSI REDDY D.No.22-89-7, SIDDESWARAM, PEDHAGANTYADA, GAJUWAKA, VISAKHAPATNAM-530044 | YSRCP |
| Gajuwaka Zone | 75 | | | Gujuwaka Assembly Constituency | SMT. PULI LAKSHMIBAI D.No.20-18-02, NELLIMUKKU, PEDHAGANTYADA, RH COLONY, VISAKHAPATNAM-530044 | TDP |
| Gajuwaka Zone | 76 | | | Gujuwaka Assembly Constituency | SRI SRINIVASA RAO GANDHAM D.No. 14-6-20/5 WILIMMS GARDENS, B C ROAD, GAJUWAKA VSP 26 | TDP |
| Aganampudi Zone | 77 | | | | SMT.BATTU SURYA KUMARI D.No.7-97, BATTU DODDI, PITTAVANIPALEM, VSP | YSRCP |
| Aganampudi Zone | 78 | | | | DR BODDU GANGARAO D.NO.9-37-15, PITHAPURAM COLONY, VISAKHAPATNAM- 530003 | CPI(M) |
| Aganampudi Zone | 79 | | | | SRI ROUTHU SRINIVASU D.NO.12-30, VINAYAKA NAGAR, LANKELAPALEM, PARVADA MANDAL, VSP-19 | TDP |
| Anakapalli Zone | 80 | | | | SMT.NEELIMA KONATHALA D.NO.17-2-14, KARRIPEDDAYYA GARI VEEDHI, GAVARAPALEM, ANAKAPALLI, VSP – 531002 | YSRCP |
| Anakapalli Zone | 81 | | | | SMT.PEELA LAKSHMI SOWJANYA D.NO.15-19-10, WOMENS COLLEGE VEEDHI, GAVARAPALEM, ANAKAPALLI, VSP - 531 002 | YSR CP |
| Anakapalli Zone | 82 | | | | SMT.SUNEETHA MANDAPATI D.NO.3-3-65, NARASINGARAOPETA, ANAKAPALLI, VISAKHAPATNAM - 531001 | YSRCP |
| Anakapalli Zone | 83 | | | | SMT.JAJULA PRASANNALAKSHMI D.NO.4-9-16, MIRIYALA COLONY, ANAKAPALLI, VSP DIST. PIN CODE 531001 | YSRCP |
| Anakapalli Zone | 84 | | | | SMT.MADAMSETTY CHINATHALLI D.NO.1-56, CHINA TADI, PARAWADA, VSP DIST. PIN CODE 531001 | TDP |
| Aganampudi Zone | 85 | | | | SMT.ILLAPU VARA LAKSHMI "PLOT NUM:166-167 PHARMACITY COLONY, LEMARTHY AGRAHARAM AGANAMPUDI VIZAG- 530046 | YSRCP |
| Gajuwaka Zone | 86 | | | Gujuwaka Assembly Constituency | SRI LELLA KOTESWARA RAO, D.NO.31-6-11 SHATHAVAHANA NAGAR, KURMANNAPALEM, VADLAPUDI, VIZAG-46 | TDP |
| Gajuwaka Zone | 87 | | | Gujuwaka Assembly Constituency | SRI BONDA JAGANNADHAM D.NO.28-15-9, R H COLONY, VADLAPUDI(POST), VISAKHAPATNAM-530046 | TDP |
| Pendurthi Zone | 88 | | | | SRI MOLLI MUTYALU D.NO.2-101 VEDULA NARAVA, SABBAVARAM(M), VISAKHAPATNAM- 530046 | TDP |
| West Zone | 89 | | | Visakhapatnam West Assembly Constituency | SRI.DADI VENKATA RAMESWARA RAO, D.NO.3-20/1, KOTHA PALEM, GOPALPATNAM, VISAKHAPATNAM - 530027 | TDP |
| West Zone | 90 | | | Visakhapatnam West Assembly Constituency | SRI BOMMIDI RAMANA D.NO.58-21-5/1, PLOT NO.TF-1, SURYA SUNDARA ENCLAVE, APSEB COLONY, BUTCHIRAJU PALEM, VISAKHAPATNAM - 530027 | TDP |
| West Zone | 91 | | | Visakhapatnam West Assembly Constituency | SMT.KUNCHE JOTHSNA D.NO.38-20-43/3, 104 AREA, MARRIPALEM, VISAKHAPATNAM - 530018 | YSR CP |
| West Zone | 92 | | | Visakhapatnam West Assembly Constituency | SMT.BEHARA VENKATA SWARNA LATHA SIVA DEVI, DO.NO.14-7, R.R.V.PURAM, GOPALAPATNAM, VISAKHAPATNAM, AP. PIN: 530029. | YSRCP |
| Pendurthi Zone | 93 | | | | SRI RAPARTHI TRIVENI VARA PRASAD RAO D.NO.8-58, NAIDU THOTA, VEPAGUNTA POST, PENDURTHI, VISAKHAPATNAM, AP-530047. | TDP |
| Pendurthi Zone | 94 | | | | SRI BALLA SRINIVASA RAO D.NO.4-29, BALLA STREET, VEPAGUNTA, VISAKHAPATNAM- 530047 | TDP |
| Pendurthi Zone | 95 | | | | SRI MUMMANA DEMUDU D.NO. 10-156 SAVITRI NAGAR, CHINNAMUSIDIWAD, PENDURTHI, VISAKHAPATNAM. | YSRCP |
| Pendurthi Zone | 96 | | | | SRI PEELA SRINIVASA RAO D.NO. 1-89-3 BRAHMANA VEEDI, NEAR RAMALAYAM, PENDURTHI, VISAKHAPATNAM | TDP |
| Pendurthi Zone | 97 | | | | SMT.SENAPATHI VASATHA D.NO. 10-150/5 SAVITRI NAGAR, CHINNAMUSIDIWADA, PENDURTHI, VISAKHAPATNAM. | TDP |
| Madhurawada Zone | 98 | | | Bheemunipatnam Assembly Constituency | SRI PISINI VARAHA NARASIMHAM, D.NO.3-219 KAPU VEEDI, ADAVI VARAM, SIMHACHALAM, VISAKHAPATNAM. | TDP |

== Functions ==
Visakhapatnam Municipal Corporation is created for the following functions:

- Planning for the town including its surroundings which are covered under its Department's Urban Planning Authority .
- Approving construction of new buildings and authorizing use of land for various purposes.
- Improvement of the town's economic and social status.
- Arrangements of water supply towards commercial, residential, and industrial purposes.
- Planning for fire contingencies through Fire Service Departments.
- Creation of solid waste management, public health system, and sanitary services.
- Working for the development of ecological aspect like development of Urban Forestry and making guidelines for environmental protection.
- Working for the development of weaker sections of the society like mentally and physically disabled, old age and gender biased people.
- Making efforts for improvement of slums and poverty removal in the town.

== Revenue sources ==
The following are the Income sources for the Corporation from the Central and State Government.

=== Revenue from taxes ===
Following is the Tax related revenue for the corporation.

- Property tax.
- Profession tax.
- Entertainment tax.
- Grants from Central and State Government like Goods and Services Tax.
- Advertisement tax.

=== Revenue from non-tax sources ===
Following is the Non Tax related revenue for the corporation.

- Water usage charges.
- Fees from Documentation services.
- Rent received from municipal property.
- Funds from municipal bonds.

== Zones ==
GVMC is divided by 8 Zones and each Zone had a Zonal Commissioner

| Zone | Location |
|---|---|
| Zone 1 | Bheemunipatnam |
| Zone 2 | Madhurawada |
| Zone 3 | Asilmetta |
| Zone 4 | Suryabagh |
| Zone 5 | Gnanapuram |
| Zone 6 | Gajuwaka |
| Zone 7 | Anakapalli |
| Zone 8 | Vepagunta |

== Awards and achievements ==
- Best Municipal Corporation Award by Government of Andhra Pradesh
- Cleanest Religious City Award by India Today (2015)
- Smart Campus Award (2018)
- Basic Services for Urban Poor (BSUP) (2011)
- Smart City Project Award (social aspects) (2018)
- 3rd Cleanest City of India by Swachh Survekshan 2017.
- 5th Cleanest City of India (2016)
- 1st place in Andhra Pradesh Green Awards (2017)

== Municipal elections ==
=== 2021 elections ===
| S.No. | Party Name | Symbol | Won | Change |
|---|---|---|---|---|
| 1 | YSR Congress Party | | 58 | Steady |
| 2 | Telugu Desam Party | | 30 | Steady |
| 3 | Independents | | 4 | Steady |
| 4 | Jana Sena Party | | 3 | Steady |
| 5 | Bharatiya Janata Party | | 1 | Steady |
| 6 | Communist Party of India (Marxist) | | 1 | Steady |
| 7 | Communist Party of India | | 1 | Steady |

=== 2026 Elections ===
| S.No. | Party Name | Symbol | Won | Change |
|---|---|---|---|---|
| 1 | Telugu Desam Party | | 64 | ▲34 |
| 2 | Jana Sena Party | | 26 | ▲23 |
| 3 | YSR Congress Party | | 13 | ▼45 |
| 4 | Bharatiya Janata Party | | 8 | ▲7 |
| 5 | Independents | | 8 | ▲4 |
| 6 | Communist Party of India (Marxist) | | 1 | Steady |
| 7 | Communist Party of India | | 0 | ▼1 |

== See also ==
- List of municipal corporations in Andhra Pradesh
