= Visakhapatnam (urban) mandal =

Visakhapatnam (urban)
- Mandal
- Interactive map of Visakhapatnam (urban)
- Location in Andhra Pradesh, India
- Coordinates: 17.832538°N 83.336248°E
- Country: India
- State: Andhra Pradesh
- District: Visakhapatnam
- Headquarters: Visakhapatnam

Area
  - Total: 111.60 km^{2} (43.09 sq mi)

Population (2011)
  - Total: 977,771
  - Density: 8,761.4/km^{2} (22,692/sq mi)

Languages
  - Official: Telugu
- Time zone: UTC+5:30 (IST)

Visakhapatnam (urban) mandal is one of the 43 mandals in Visakhapatnam district of Andhra Pradesh in India. It is administered under Visakhapatnam revenue division and its headquarters are located at Visakhapatnam. The mandal lies on the coast of Bay of Bengal and is bounded by Visakhapatnam (rural) mandal.

There are no villages in the mandal. The mandal consists of the city of Visakhapatnam, which is a municipal corporation.

Visakhapatnam urban mandal divided in to :

- Seethammadhara
- Maharanipeta
- Gopalapatnam
- Mulagada.

== See also ==
- Visakhapatnam district
