= Mulagada mandal =

- Mandal
- Interactive map of Mulagada mandal
- Location in Andhra Pradesh, India
- Coordinates: 17.699095°N 83.224024°E
- Country: India
- State: Andhra Pradesh
- District: Visakhapatnam
- Headquarters: Mulagada

Languages
  - Official: Telugu
- Time zone: UTC+5:30 (IST)

Mulagada mandal is one of the 11 mandals in Visakhapatnam district of Andhra Pradesh in India. It is administered under Visakhapatnam revenue division and its headquarters is located at Mulagada. The mandal lies on the south fringe of Visakhapatnam city and is bounded by Gajuwaka and Pedagantyada mandals.

There are no villages in this mandal as it is located within the jurisdiction of Greater Visakhapatnam Municipal Corporation, which is responsible for the civic amenities of Mulagada.
