= Duvvada =

- Neighbourhood
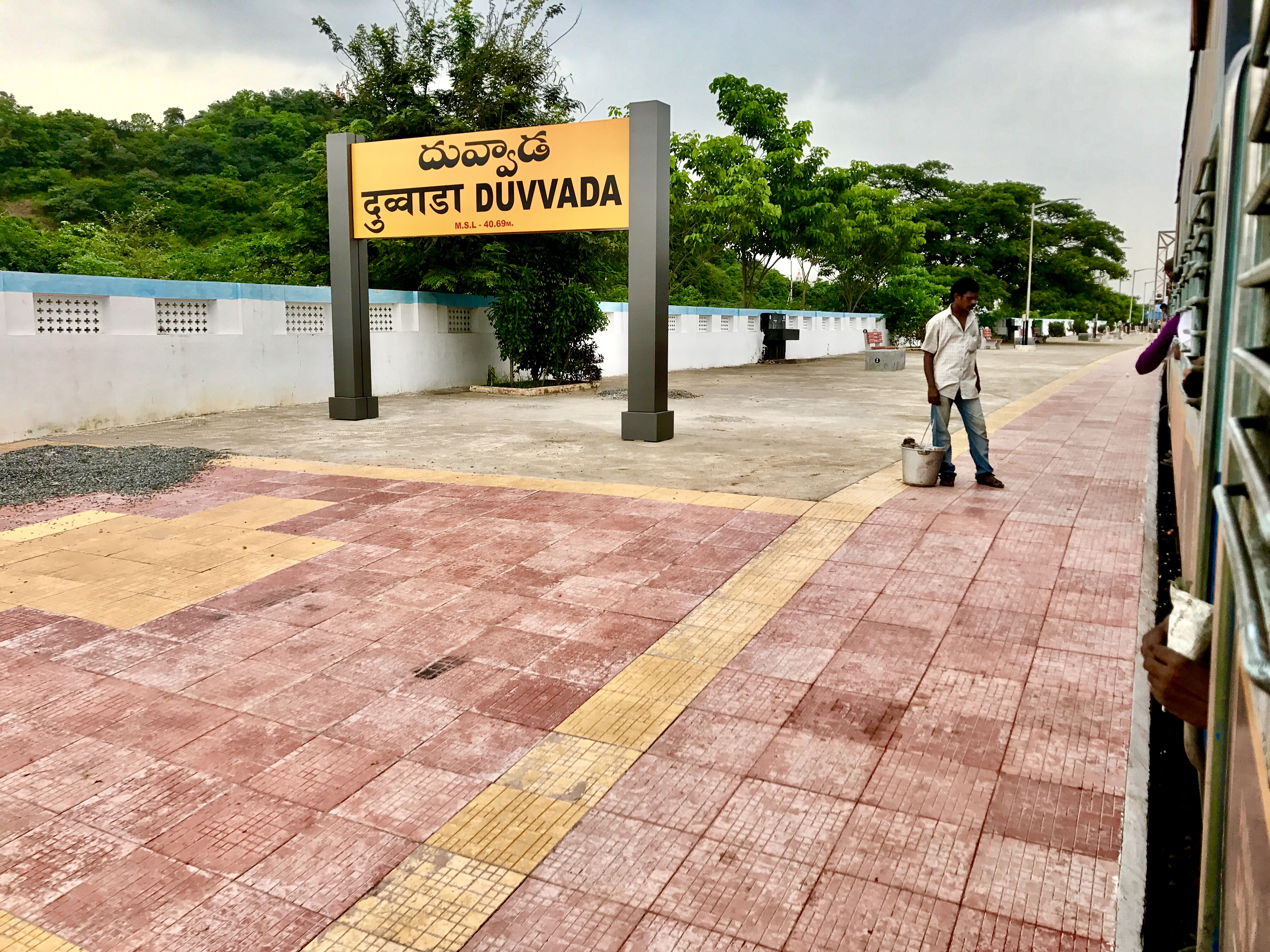
- Duvvada railway station name board

- Location in Visakhapatnam
- Coordinates: 17°41′59″N 83°09′27″E
- Country: India
- State: Andhra Pradesh
- District: Visakhapatnam

Government
  - Body: Greater Visakhapatnam Municipal Corporation

Languages
  - Official: Telugu
- Time zone: UTC+5:30 (IST)
- PIN: 530046, 530049
- Vehicle registration: AP 32 and AP 33

Duvvada is a suburban area of Visakhapatnam city, under the Revenue Mandal of Gajuwaka in Greater Visakhapatnam Municipal Corporation. A sub-post office located at Duvvada with PINs 530046 and 530049.

== Etymology ==
The name Duvvada was earlier Dvivada, meaning 'Two Forts' or 'Town of Two forts'.

== Transport ==
APSRTC buses are accessible from Dwaraka Bus Station are 38Y & 400K. And also buses are access from surrounding areas are Gajuwaka, Kurmannapalem, Visakhapatnam Steel Plant, Aganampudi, Vadlapudi etc.

=== Bus ===
These are the APSRTC routes that service Duvvada:

Route number	Start	End	Via
38Y	Duvvada Railway Station	RTC Complex	Kurmannaplem, Old Gajuwaka, BHPV, Airport, NAD Kotharoad, Birla Junction, Gurudwar
400K	Duvvada Railway Station	Maddilapalem	Kurmannaplem, Old Gajuwaka, New Gajuwaka, Malkapuram, Scindia, Railway Station, RTC Complex

=== Rail ===
Duvvada railway station serves about 108,000 passengers on a daily basis. Many of trains always rush like Jhanmabhoomi express, Ratnachal express which are intercity service to other big cities like Chennai, Secunderabad, vijayawada and Guntur.^{[4]}

== Features ==
- QualityInn Ramachandra Hotels is located near Duvvada Railway Station, well suited for Business stays, Conference meetings and for value-adding Industrial visits to Vizag Steel Plant, APIIC SEZ.
- Vignan College of Engineering and Technology is near to Duvvada railway station.
- Gonna Institute of information technology (GIITS) is a nearby Engineering college (7 km from station) which offers B.tech and diploma courses
- There is a suburban railway station of Visakhapatnam in East Coast Railway, Indian Railways.
- It has been developed as a satellite station for Visakhapatnam Railway Station, It has 4 platforms.
- long-distance trains also have halted at Duvvuda station.
- The Duvvuda Station is near to VSEZ Visakhapatnam Special Economic Zone and also to Vizag Steel Plant (RINL-VIZAG).
- Duvvada railway station is the first station of East Coast Railway

== Gallery ==
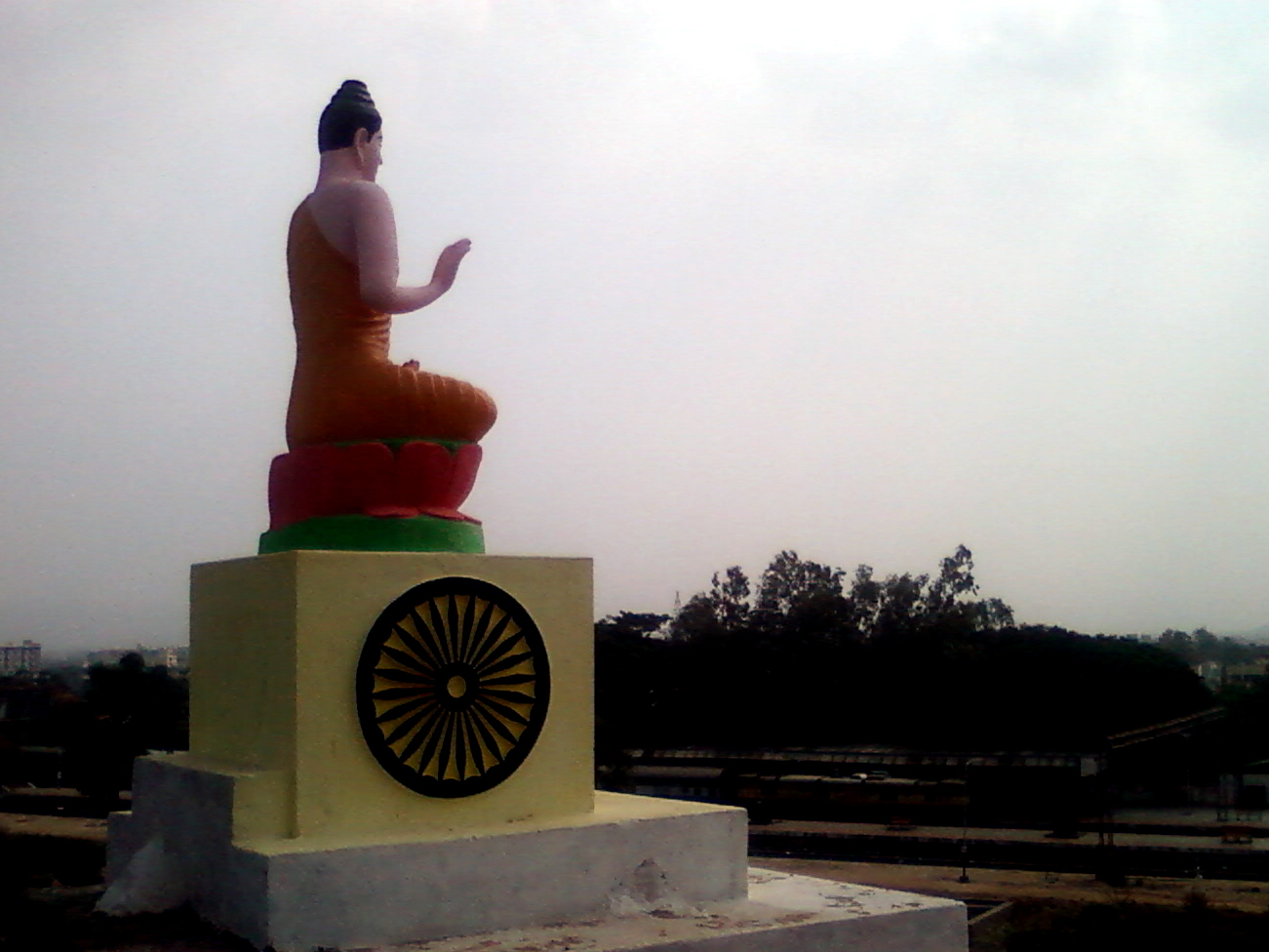
Statue of Buddha at Dammagiri in Duvvda

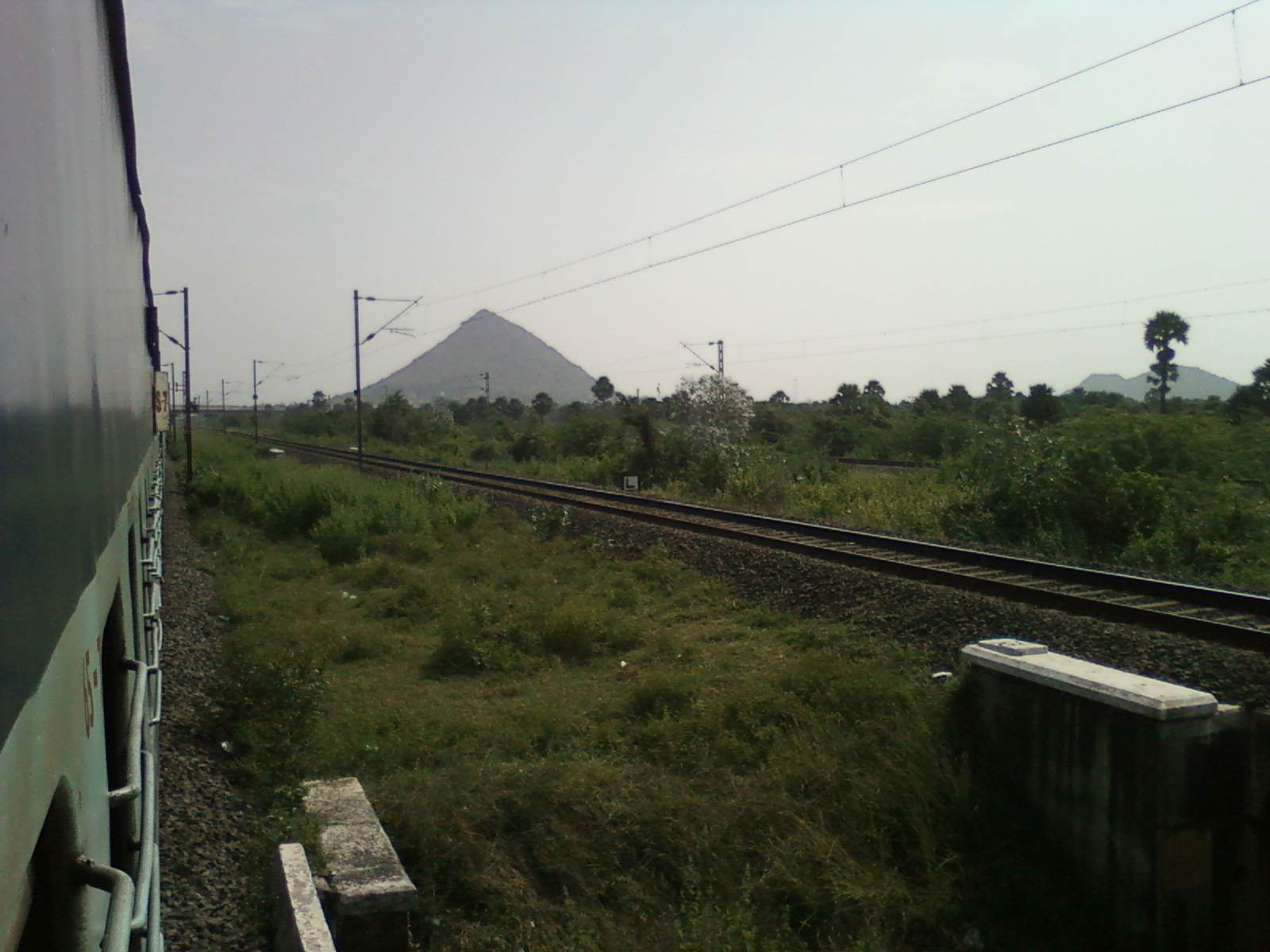
Duvvada beside Railway track

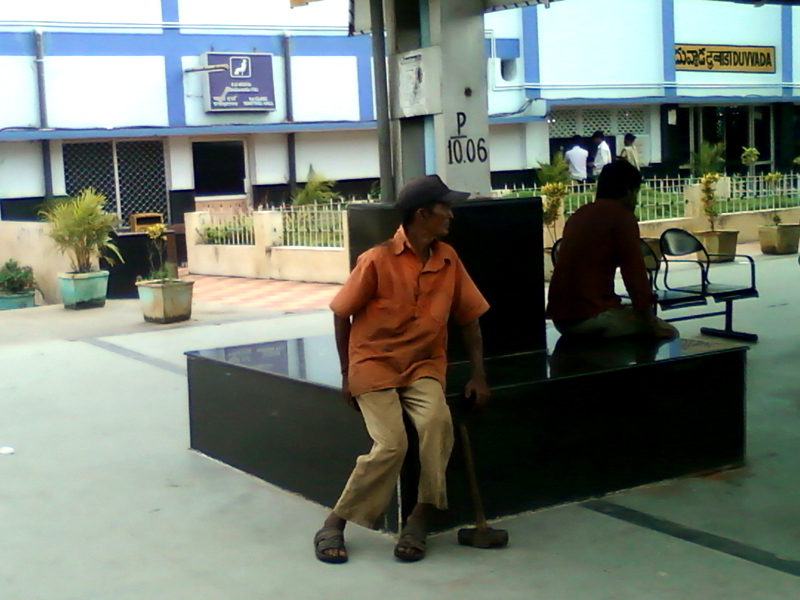
A railway gangman at Duvvada railway station

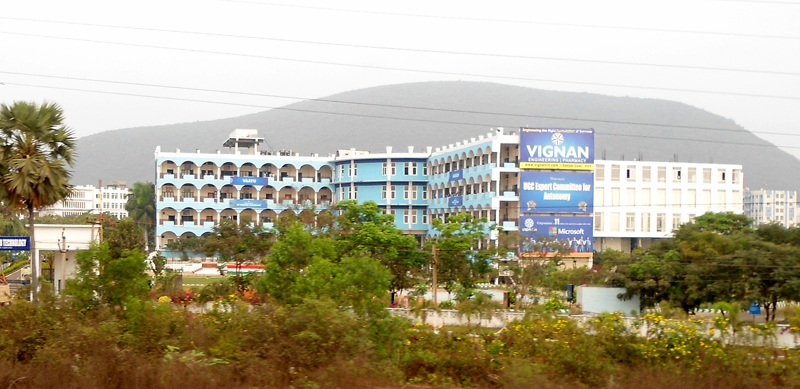
Vignan Engineering College at Duvvada in Visakhapatnam
