= Malkapuram =

- Neighbourhood
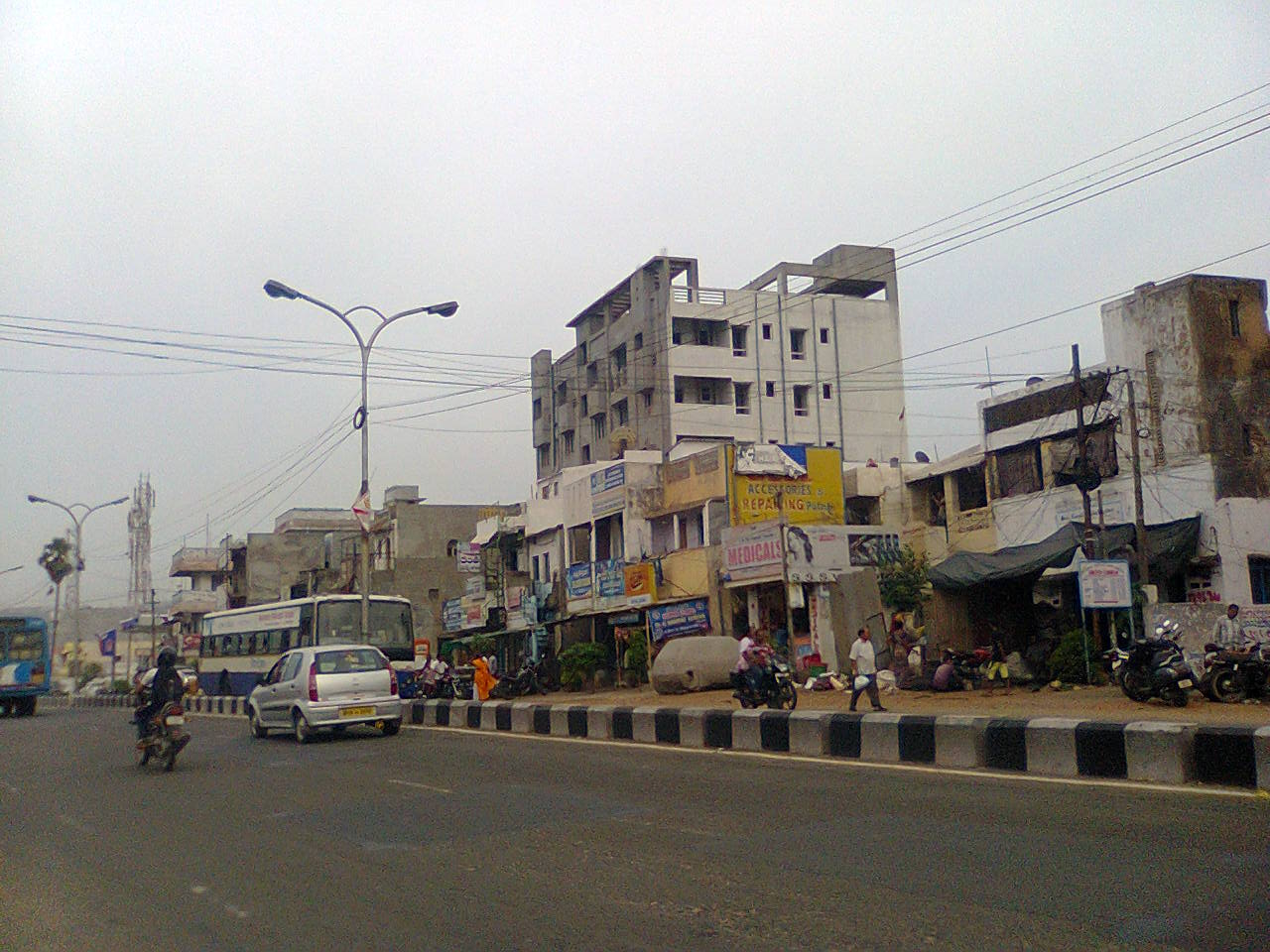
- Malkapuram main road

- Location in Visakhapatnam
- Coordinates: 17.688000°N 83.245468°E
- Country: India
- State: Andhra Pradesh
- District: Visakhapatnam

Government
  - Type: Mayor-council
  - Body: Greater Visakhapatnam Municipal Corporation

Languages
  - Official: Telugu
- Time zone: UTC+5:30 (IST)
- PIN: 530011
- Vehicle registration: AP39/40
- Sasana Sabha constituency: Visakhapatnam West
- Lok Sabha constituency: Visakhapatnam

Malkapuram is a neighbourhood in the city of Visakhapatnam, India. The neighbourhood is considered as the major residential area in the district. It is located within the jurisdiction of the Greater Visakhapatnam Municipal Corporation, which is responsible for the civic amenities in Malkapuram. It is located on the south fringe of Visakhapatnam city.

== Economy ==
Since most of the heavy industries established in Visakhapatnam, like Hindustan Petroleum Corporation Limited, Hindustan Shipyard Limited, Naval Dockyard Visakhapatnam and Coromandel International lie in close proximity of Malkapuram, its growth has mirrored that of Visakhapatnam.

== Location and geography ==
Malkapuram is located about 12 km from Visakhapatnam Airport and about 11 km from Visakhapatnam railway station. It lies to the south fringe of Visakhapatnam City and is loosely bordered by Gajuwaka to the west and Naval Coast Guard to the east, Marripalem to the north, Gopalapatnam to the north-west and Pedagantyada to the south-west.

== Transport ==
Malkapuram is well connected by road. It also has major district roads connecting it to nearby mandals and Visakhapatnam. The Andhra Pradesh State Road Transport Corporation runs bus services from Gajuwaka bus station to major parts of the state and Visakhapatnam city.

APSRTC routes

Route number	Start	End	Via
400	Gajuwaka	RTC Complex	New Gajuwaka, Sriharipuram, Malkapuram, Scindia, Naval Dockyard, Railway Station
99	Gajuwaka	R.K.Beach	New Gajuwaka, Sriharipuram, Malkapuram, Scindia, Naval Dockyard, Town Kotharoad, Jagadamba
600	Scindia	Anakapalli	Malkapuram, Sriharipuram, New Gajuwaka, Old Gajuwaka, Kurmannapalem and Lankelapalem
55	Scindia	Simhachalam	Malkapuram, Sriharipuram, New Gajuwaka, Old Gajuwaka, BHPV, Airport, NAD Junction, Gopalapatnam
