= Tunglam =

Tungalam
- Neighbourhood
- Location in Visakhapatnam
- Country: India
- State: Andhra Pradesh
- District: Vishakhapatnam

Government
  - Body: Greater Visakhapatnam Municipal Corporation

Languages
  - Official: Telugu
- Time zone: UTC+5:30 (IST)
- PIN: 530012
- Vehicle registration: AP - 33
- Sex ratio: 3:1 ♂/♀
- Literacy: 84%%
- Lok Sabha constituency: Visakhapatnam
- Vidhan Sabha constituency: Gajuwaka

Tungalam is a suburban area in Visakhapatnam, India.

== History ==
Tungalam, has a history of over 100 years. It has progressed quickly. Villagers worship the Gramadevathas kunchalamma, Durgalamma and Muthyalamma. People from different areas visit the village, due to its concentric location to many industries. The cricket player Nitish Kumar Reddy is from Tunglam.

== Features ==
Tungalam is 6 km (3.7 mi) from Visakhapatnam airport, 16 km (9.9 mi) from Visakhapatnam Railway station and 6 km from Duvvada railway station.

== Other information ==
Many residents to the area work in the AutoNagar industrial area. On 14 November 2008, Ramoji Rao of Eenadu group inaugurated Eenadu's main office, located at Seethmmadara. This area is in Gajuwaka Constituency, previously a part of Pendurthi constituency prior to constituency reformations. The first counselor of this ward was Kaki. Govinda Reddy of TDP party. This ward has been awarded "fastest developing ward" under the ruling of Govind Reddy. The Telugu Desam Party, led by Chandra Babu Naidu gave him State secretary. He also worked as Telugu Yuvatha Chief Secretary of Andhra Pradesh. BHPV, a well-known company (Recently acquired by BHEL) is located beside Tungalam. Many residents of the area work abroad in Singapore, Qatar, or Dubai. This village used to belong to the Gajuwaka municipality with 5th ward, but has been merged into Greater Visakha Municipal Corporation with 59th ward.

On 20 April 1989 worshippers of Sri kala Ratna NTR & Bala Krishna constructed Jai Santoshimatha Temple. This mandir was reconstructed by nandamuri worshippers with around 10 Lakhs (10*100,000) rupees and was inaugurated by Nata Ratna Nandamuri Balakrishna on 24 February 2011. He attended various poojas at this place.

== Transport ==
RTC buses are available here. Buses are also available at BHPV.

APSRTC routes

| Route number | Start | End | Via |
|---|---|---|---|
| 1 | Vudapark | Yadavajaggarajupeta | RK Beach, Jagadamba, Town Kotharoad, Convent, Scindia, Malkapuram, Gajuwaka, Tunglam |
| 1T | Vudapark | Kaputungalam | RK Beach, Jagadamba, Town Kotharoad, Convent, Scindia, Malkapuram, Gajuwaka, kapuTungalam |
