= Homi Bhabha Cancer Hospital and Research Centre, Visakhapatnam =

Coordinates: 17.6914°N 83.1160°E

Homi Bhabha Cancer Hospital & Research Centre

Geography
- Location: Aganampudi, Visakhapatnam, Andhra Pradesh, India

Organisation
- Affiliated university: Homi Bhabha National Institute

History
- Founded: 2014

Links
- Website: tmc.gov.in

Homi Bhabha Cancer Hospital & Research Centre is a cancer care hospital and research centre in Visakhapatnam, Andhra Pradesh, India. This regional cancer centre is funded by the Government of India and Tata Memorial Centre. The Indian Council of Medical Research has recognised this institution as a research organisation.

The director of the Institution, Dr. Digumarti Raghunadharao, has been working in the area since 2013. He has worked in the Nizam's Institute of Medical Sciences, Hyderabad for more than 20 years and was an honoured recipient of Dr. B. C. Roy National Award for 2016.

== History ==
Homi Bhabha Cancer Hospital & Research Centre is supported by Bhabha Atomic Research Centre and Tata Memorial Centre. It was established in 2014. Located in Aganampudi, this institute covers an area of 77 acres (31 ha) on land allotted by APIIC. The total project cost is ₹540 crores.
