= Nathayyapalem =

Nathayyapalem నాతయ్యపాలెం
- Neighbourhood
- Location in Visakhapatnam
- Coordinates: 17.710579°N 83.199344°E
- Country: India
- State: Andhra Pradesh
- District: Visakhapatnam

Government
  - Body: Greater Visakhapatnam Municipal Corporation

Languages
  - Official: Telugu
- Time zone: UTC+5:30 (IST)
- PIN: 530012
- Vehicle registration: AP-31

Nathayyapalem is a neighborhood situated in the northern part of Visakhapatnam City, India. The area, which falls under the local administrative limits of Greater Visakhapatnam Municipal Corporation, is about 17 km from the Maddilapalem city centre. Nathayyapalem is located between Sheela Nagar and Gajuwaka. It is well connected with Dwaraka Nagar, NAD X Road and Madhurawada.

== Transport ==
APSRTC routes:

Route number	Start	End	Via
38	Gajuwaka	RTC Complex	BHPV, Airport, NAD Kotharoad, Birla Junction, Gurudwar
38K	Kurmannapalem	RTC Complex	Old Gajuwaka, BHPV, Airport, NAD Kotharoad, Birla Junction, Gurudwar
38H	Gantyada HB Colony	RTC Complex	Pedagantyada, New Gajuwaka, Old Gajuwaka, BHPV, Airport, NAD Kotharoad, Birla Junction, Gurudwar
38T	Steel Plant	RTC Complex	Kurmannapalem, Old Gajuwaka, BHPV, Airport, NAD Kotharoad, Birla Junction, Gurudwar
38D	Nadupuru	RTC Complex	Pedagantyada, New Gajuwaka, Old Gajuwaka, BHPV, Airport, NAD Kotharoad, Birla Junction, Gurudwar
38J	Janata Colony	RTC Complex	Sriharipuram, New Gajuwaka, Old Gajuwaka, BHPV, Airport, NAD Kotharoad, Birla Junction, Gurudwar
38Y	Duvvada Railway Station	RTC Complex	Kurmannaplem, Old Gajuwaka, BHPV, Airport, NAD Kotharoad, Birla Junction, Gurudwar
55	Scindia	Simhachalam	Malkapuram, New Gajuwaka, Old Gajuwaka, BHPV, Airport, NAD Kotharoad, Gopalapatnam
