= Mulagada =

- Neighbourhood
- Location in Visakhapatnam
- Coordinates: 17.699095°N 83.224024°E
- Country: India
- State: Andhra Pradesh
- District: Visakhapatnam
- Established: 2018
- Founder: Government of Andhra Pradesh

Government
  - Type: Mayor-council
  - Body: GVMC

Population
  - Total: 175,575

Languages
  - Official: Telugu
- Time zone: UTC+5:30 (IST)
- PIN: 530011
- Vidhan Sabha constituency: Visakhapatnam West
- Lok Sabha constituency: Visakhapatnam

Mulagada is a neighbourhood in the city of Visakhapatnam, India. It is one of the 46 mandals in Visakhapatnam District. It is under the administration of Visakhapatnam revenue division and the headquarters is located at Mulagada. It is located on the south fringe of Visakhapatnam city.

The mandal is located within the jurisdiction of the Greater Visakhapatnam Municipal Corporation, which is responsible for the civic amenities in Mulagada . It is bounded by Gajuwaka and Pedagantyada mandals.

== Wards ==
Mulagada mandal consists of following wards

1. Malkapuram
2. Gullalapalem
3. Mulagada

== Nearby Localities ==
Malkapuram (2km), Gajuwaka (3km), Pedagantyada (6km) are the nearby localities.

== Economy ==
Since most of the heavy industries established in Visakhapatnam, like Hindustan Petroleum Corporation Limited, Hindustan Shipyard Limited, Naval Dockyard Visakhapatnam and Coromandel International lie in close proximity of Mulagada, its growth has mirrored that of Visakhapatnam.

== Location and Geography ==
Mulagada is located about 11 km from Visakhapatnam Airport and about 12 km from Visakhapatnam railway station. It lies to the south fringe of Visakhapatnam City and is loosely bordered by Gajuwaka to the west and Malkapuram to the east, Marripalem to the north, Gopalapatnam to the north-west and Pedagantyada to the south-west.

== Transport ==
APSRTC routes

Route number	Start	End	Via
400	Gajuwaka	RTC Complex	New Gajuwaka, Sriharipuram, Malkapuram, Scindia, Naval Dockyard, Visakhapatnam Railway Station
99	Gajuwaka	R.K.Beach	New Gajuwaka, Sriharipuram, Malkapuram, Scindia, Naval Dockyard, Old Post Office, Jagadamba, Maharanipeta
600	Scindia	Anakapalli	Malkapuram, Sriharipuram, New Gajuwaka, Old Gajuwaka, Aganampudi, Lankelapalem
55	Scindia	Simhachalam	Malkapuram, Sriharipuram, New Gajuwaka, Old Gajuwaka, Narava, Airport, NAD Junction, Gopalapatnam
55K	Scindia	Kothavalasa	Malkapuram, Sriharipuram, New Gajuwaka, Old Gajuwaka, Narava, Airport, NAD Junction, Gopalapatnam, Pendurthi
38J	Janatha Colony	RTC Complex	Jawahar Nagar, Coromandel, New Gajuwaka, Old Gajuwaka, Narava, Airport, NAD Junction, Kancherapalem, Gurudwar

== Organisations ==
Organisations like Hindustan Petroleum Corporation Limited, Coromandel International, Hindustan Shipyard Limited, Eastern Naval Command are located in this area.

=== HPCL ===
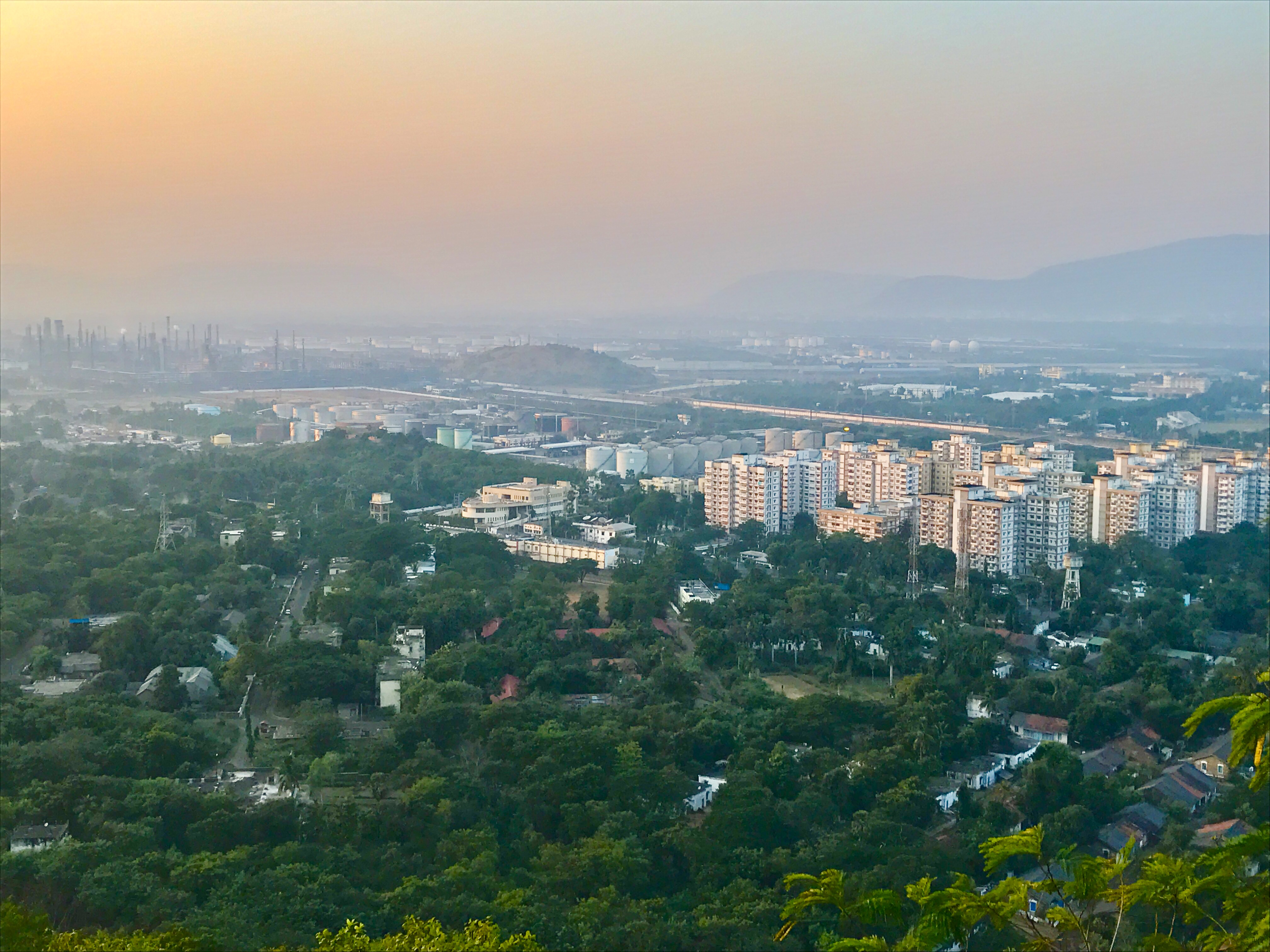
A view of HPCL from Yarada Hill, Visakhapatnam

=== Coromandel International ===
Coromandel International Limited is an Indian corporation founded in the early 1960s by IMC and Chevron Companies of USA. Originally named Coromandel Fertilisers, the company is in the business of fertilizers, pesticides and specialty nutrients. The company is also in rural retail business at Visakhapatnam, Andhra Pradesh through its Mana Gromor Centres.

=== Hindustan Shipyard Limited ===
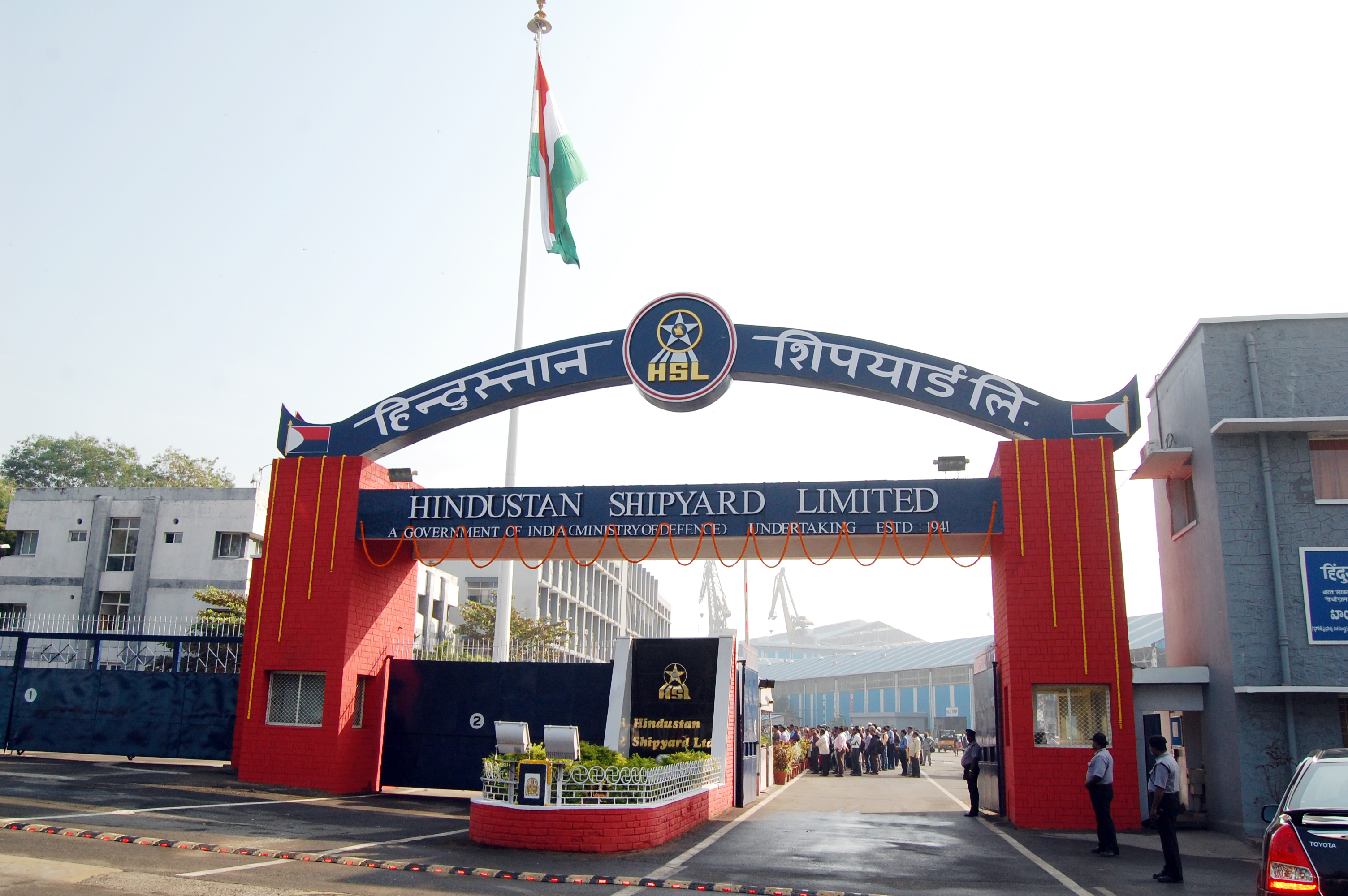
A view of the Hindustan Shipyard at Visakhapatnam

Hindustan Shipyard Limited (HSL) is a shipyard located in Visakhapatnam on the east coast of India. Founded as the Scindia Shipyard, it was built by industrialist Walchand Hirachand as a part of The Scindia Steam Navigation Company Ltd. Walchand selected Visakhapatnam as a strategic and ideal location and took possession of land in November 1940.

=== Eastern Naval Command ===
The Eastern Naval Command of the Indian Navy is one of its three major formations. It utilizes Visakhapatnam as its headquarters, and has bases there and at Kolkata. It is the first and largest naval command in India.
