= Aganampudi =

- Neighbourhood
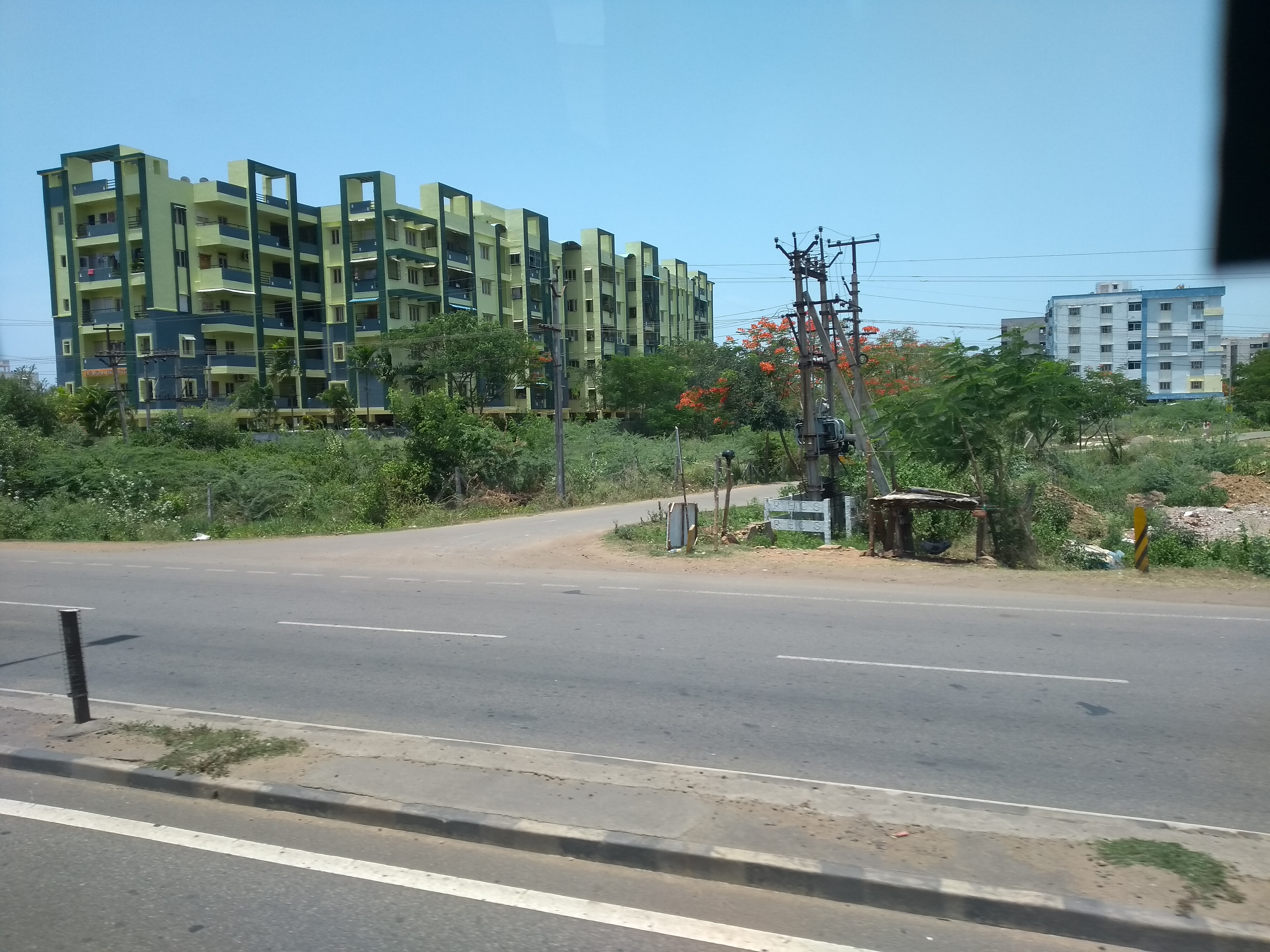
- Apartments at Aganampudi

- Location in Visakhapatnam
- Coordinates: 17.682734°N 83.142921°E
- Country: India
- State: Andhra Pradesh
- District: Visakhapatnam

Government
  - Body: Greater Visakhapatnam Municipal Corporation

Languages
  - Official: Telugu
- Time zone: UTC+5:30 (IST)
- PIN: 530053
- Vehicle registration: AP-31

Aganampudi is a suburb of the city of Visakhapatnam state of Andhra Pradesh, India.

== About ==
Aganampudi is one of the important suburbs in Visakhapatnam with many industries and engineering colleges situated there. Gajuwaka RTO office is located in this area. This area sits adjacent to the township of Visakhapatnam steel plant.

== Transport ==
It is well connected with Gajuwaka, NAD X Road, Malkapuram, Dwaraka Nagar and Visakhapatnam Steel Plant. Many local people here are working in steel plants. Nearest Railway station is Duvvada which is 4 km from here. NH 16 (chennai-kolkata Highway) passes through this village.

APSRTC routes

Route number	Start	End	Via
500	Anakapalle	RTC Complex	Lankelapalem, Kurmannaplem, Old Gajuwaka, BHPV, Airport, NAD Kotharoad, Birla Junction, Gurudwar
500Y	Yalamanchili	RTC Complex	Anakapalle, Lankelapalem, Kurmannaplem, Old Gajuwaka, BHPV, Airport, NAD Kotharoad, Birla Junction, Gurudwar
500A	Achutapuram	RTC Complex	Anakapalle, Lankelapalem, Kurmannaplem, Old Gajuwaka, BHPV, Airport, NAD Kotharoad, Birla Junction, Gurudwar
777	Achutapuram	RTC Complex	Anakapalle, Lankelapalem, Kurmannaplem, Old Gajuwaka, BHPV, Airport, NAD Kotharoad, Birla Junction, Gurudwar
99A/C	Chodavaram	RK Beach	Anakapalle, Lankelapalem, Kurmannaplem, Old Gajuwaka, New Gajuwaka, Malkapuram, Scindia, Town Kotharoad, Jagadamba
400N	Vada Chipurupalle	Maddilapalem	Parawada, Lankelapalem, Kurmannaplem, Old Gajuwaka, New Gajuwaka, Malkapuram, Scindia, Railway Station, RTC Complex
64A	Swayambhuvaram	Collector Office	Lankelapalem, Kurmannaplem, Old Gajuwaka, New Gajuwaka, Malkapuram, Scindia, Town Kotharoad, Jagadamba
77	Thanam	Collector Office	Lankelapalem, Kurmannaplem, Old Gajuwaka, New Gajuwaka, Malkapuram, Scindia, Town Kotharoad, Jagadamba
77T	Thadi	Collector Office	Lankelapalem, Kurmannaplem, Old Gajuwaka, New Gajuwaka, Malkapuram, Scindia, Town Kotharoad, Jagadamba

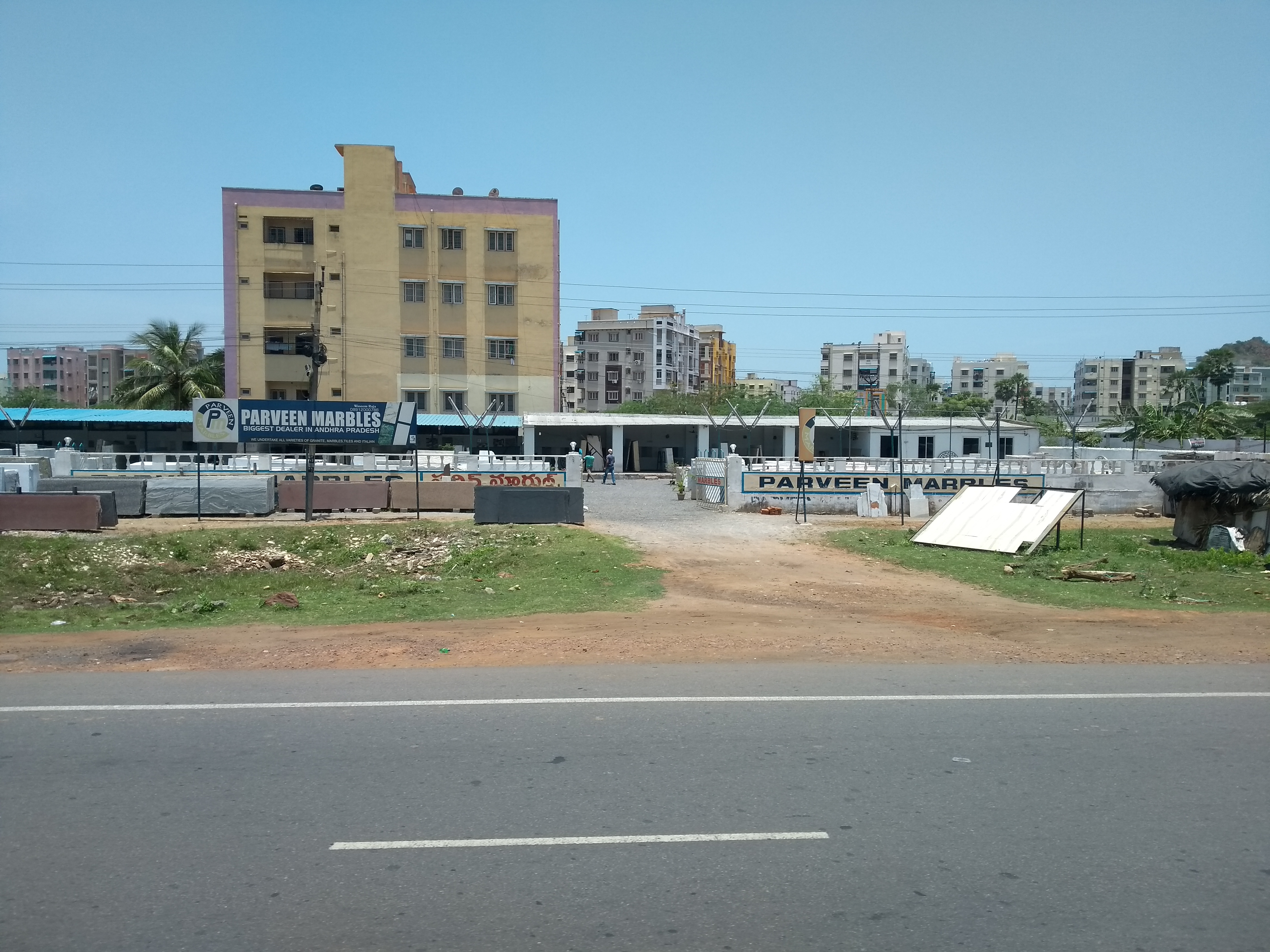
Road at Aganampudi
