= National Highway 516C (India) =

National highway in India

National Highway 516C

Route information
- Length: 12.7 km (7.9 mi)

Major junctions
- West end: Sabbavaram
- East end: Sheela Nagar

Location
- Country: India
- States: Andhra Pradesh

Highway system
- Roads in India; Expressways; National; State; Asian

National Highway 516C, commonly called NH 516C, is a national highway in the state of Andhra Pradesh in India. It is a secondary route of National Highway 16.

== See also ==
- List of national highways in India
