= P. G. V. R. Naidu =

Indian politician

Member of the Andhra Pradesh Legislative Assembly
- Incumbent
- Assumed office 2014
- Preceded by: Malla Vijaya Prasad
- Constituency: Visakhapatnam West
- In office 1999–2004
- Preceded by: M. Anjaneyulu
- Succeeded by: Tippala Gurumurthy Reddy
- Constituency: Pendurthi

Personal details
- Born: 9 May 1969 (age 57) Gopalapatnam, Visakhapatnam, Andhra Pradesh
- Party: Telugu Desam Party
- Other political affiliations: Praja Rajyam Party
- Parent: P. Appalanarasimham (father)
- Education: B.com., Avn Degree College MBA, Andhra University
- Occupation: Politician; Sportsman
- Website: https://ganababu.com

Pethakamsetti Gana Venkata Reddy Naidu (P. G. V. R. Naidu also known as Gana Babu) is an Indian politician. He is the incumbent Member of Legislative Assembly from Visakhapatnam West Assembly constituency. He is a member of the Telugu Desam Party.

== Early life ==
He was born in Gopalapatnam, Visakhapatnam District. His father is P.Appala Narasimham, who is a former M.P. for Anakapalle, MLA Pendurthi Assembly constituency and a founding member of the Telugu Desam Party. After a stint in sports, Gana Babu worked as an employee of the Visakhapatnam Steel Plant briefly before entering politics.

== Sports career ==
He is an international volleyball player and represented the country on multiple occasions. He has won a gold medal at the Pune National Games and a Silver for India in the World Super Series held in Perth, Australia.

He is actively involved in sports organisations and worked for the Sports Authority of Andhra Pradesh, thereby actively involved in the organisation of the National Games in Visakhapatnam & Hyderabad and the subsequent World Military games held in Hyderabad. He is known to be instrumental in bringing many international sports events to the state.

He is president of Andhra Pradesh Volleyball Association (APCA). He also serves as vice-president of Volleyball Federation of India (VFI) and the chairman of Visakhapatnam District Olympic Association.

== Political career ==
- He entered politics after resigning his job and winning as the ZPTC Chairman in 1995.
- He was elected to the Pendurthi Assembly Constituency in 1999 by defeating Dronamraju Srinivasa Rao.
- In the 2004 elections, he was denied ticket by the Telugu Desam Party and he stayed away from contesting.
- In 2009, he joined PRP, he contested the Visakhapatnam west Assembly Constituency but lost to Malla Vijaya Prasad by 4144 Votes.
- In 2014, he contested again from Visakhapatnam West Assembly Constituency and won with a majority of 30,857 votes by high margin by defeating Dadi Ratnakar.
- In 2019, he contested as a sitting MLA from Visakhapatnam West Assembly Constituency and won with a huge majority of 18,981 votes by defeating Malla Vijay Prasad.
- He also served as a Govt. Whip from 2017 to 2019
- In 2024, he contested again from the Visakhapatnam West Assembly Constituency and won with majority of over 35,000 votes over Adari Anand from YSRCP.
- November 2024, appointed whip.
