= Malla Vijaya Prasad =

Indian politician and film producer (born 1966)

Member of the Legislative Assembly
- In office 2009-14
- Constituency: Visakhapatnam West Assembly constituency

Personal details
- Born: 1966,57 years Visakhapatnam
- Party: YSR Congress Party
- Other political affiliations: Indian National Congress
- Spouse: Aruna Kumari
- Children: Anusha, Alekhya
- Education: Bachelor of Arts
- Occupation: Businessman, entrepreneur and politician

Malla Vijaya Prasad is an Indian politician, educationalist, film producer, former MLA and businessman. He previously served as Chairman of the Andhra Pradesh Education Welfare and Infrastructure Development Corporation.

== Early life ==
Malla Vijaya Prasad was born in 1966 at Visakhapatnam, Andhra Pradesh. He completed his B.A. at Berhampur University in Odisha, and graduated in 1998.

== Career ==
Prasad began by working in the transport business. Later, he worked in real estate and started a welfare group. He later started an engineering college and a degree college.

He produced films in Telugu. He established Vijaya Prasad Welfare Charitable Trust. He undertook social activities including education for the poor, and health camps.

=== Politics ===
He entered politics with the Congress Party. In 2009, he contested the Visakhapatnam West Assembly constituency and defeated P.G.V.R. Naidu. He joined YSR congress in 2014. He later contested in the same constituency in 2019 and lost to P.G.V.R. Naidu.

On 17 July 2021, He was appointed as Education Welfare and Infrastructure Development (EDID) board chairman by the Ruling party.

On 28 September 2024, he was announced as new YSRCP co-ordinator for Visakhapatnam West Assembly constituency.

== Film ==
He produced several films(ordered by release year):

- Siddu from Sikakulam
- Seeta Ramula Kalyanam Lankalo
- Seema Tapakai
- Friends Book
- Ramachari
- Inkenti Nuvve Cheppu
