= Vadlapudi =

- Neighbourhood
- Location in Visakhapatnam
- Coordinates: 17.688396°N 83.177744°E
- Country: India
- State: Andhra Pradesh
- District: Visakhapatnam

Languages
  - Official: Telugu
- Time zone: UTC+5:30 (IST)
- Vehicle registration: AP-31

Vadlapudi is a neighbourhood in the city of Visakhapatnam, state of Andhra Pradesh, India. It is a suburban area of the city.

== About ==
It is on the south side of the city.

== Transport ==
Vadlapudi is well connected with Madhurawada, Maddilapalem, Gajuwaka and Scindia, Visakhapatnam.
