= Maharanipeta =

- Neighbourhood
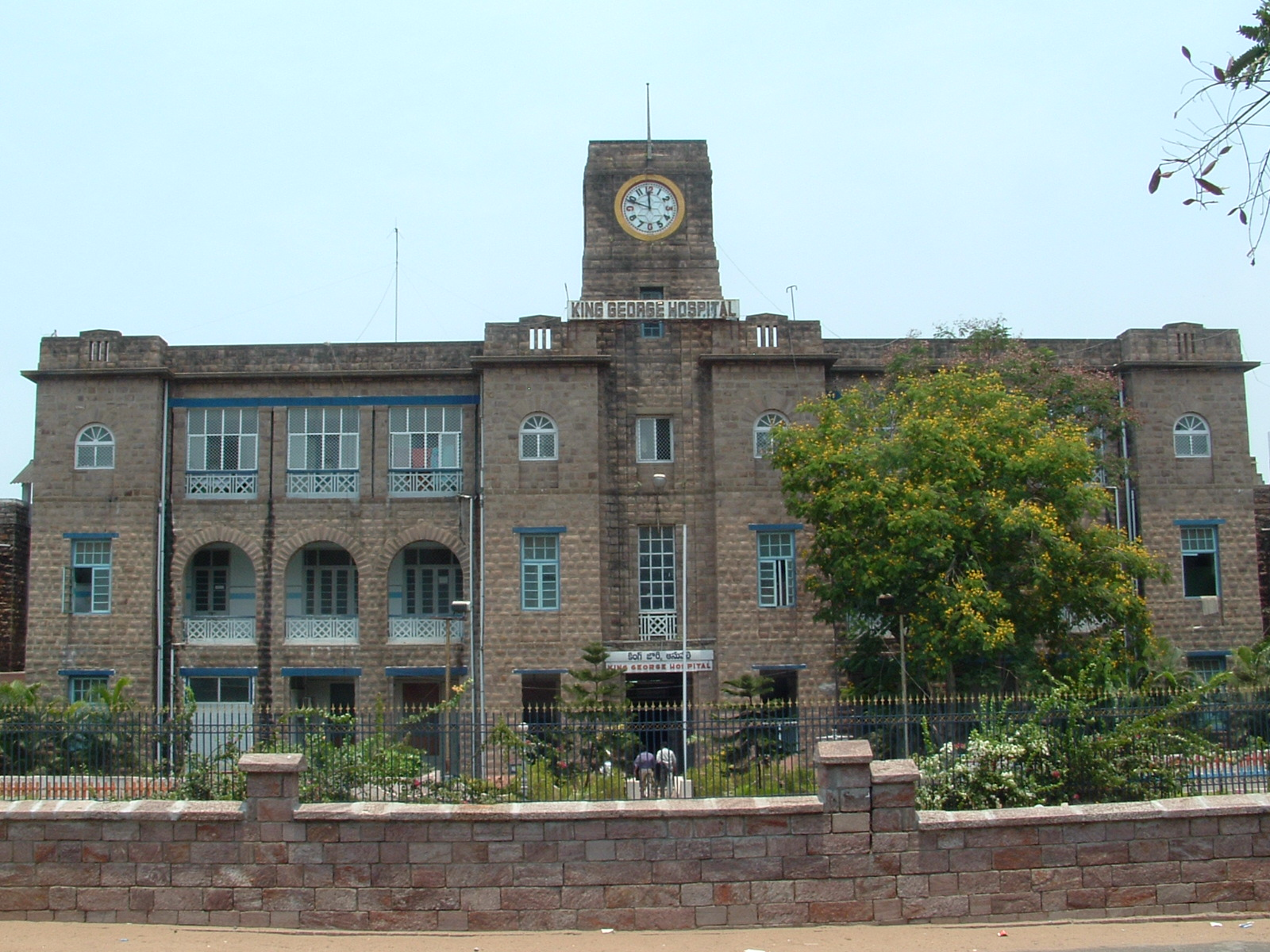
- King George Hospital at Maharanipeta

- Location in Visakhapatnam
- Coordinates: 17.709920°N 83.303109°E
- Country: India
- State: Andhra Pradesh
- District: Visakhapatnam
- Established: 2018
- Founder: Government of Andhra Pradesh

Government
  - Type: Mayor-council
  - Body: GVMC

Languages
  - Official: Telugu
- Time zone: UTC+5:30 (IST)
- PIN: 530002
- Vidhan Sabha constituency: Visakhapatnam South
- Lok Sabha constituency: Visakhapatnam

Maharanipeta is a neighbourhood in the city of Visakhapatnam, India. One of the 46 mandals of Visakhapatnam District, it is under the administration of Visakhapatnam revenue division, and its headquarters is at Maharanipeta. It is bounded by Seethammadhara and Gopalapatnam mandals. The origin of this name is unknown. It is a zone for hospitals, including King George Hospital and several private hospitals. The medical college in Andhra Pradesh, Andhra Medical College is also located there.

== Wards ==
Maharanipeta mandal consists of the wards of:

1. Allipuram
2. Chengalraopeta
3. Godari
4. Maharanipeta
5. Market
6. Port
7. Seetharamaswamy Temple
8. Shivalayam
9. Waltair

== Transportation ==
APSRTC run buses to every corner to this area; with these routes:

Route number	Start	End	Via
28	RK Beach	Simhachalam	Jagadamba Centre, RTC Complex, Kancharapalem, NAD Kotharoad, Gopalapatnam
28K/28A	RK Beach	Kothavalasa/Pendurthi	Jagadamba Centre, RTC Complex, Kancharapalem, NAD Kotharoad, Gopalapatnam, Vepagunta
28H	RK Beach	Simhachalam Hill	Jagadamba Centre, RTC Complex, Railway Station, Kancharapalem, NAD Kotharoad, Gopalapatnam
28Z/H	Zilla Parishad	Simhachalam Hill	Jagadamba Centre, RTC Complex, Gurudwara, Birla Junction, NAD Kotharoad, Gopalapatnam
99/99K	RK Beach	Old Gajuwaka/Kurmannapalem	Jagadamba Centre, Town Kotharoad, Convent, Scindia, Malkapuram, New Gajuwaka
65F	Fishing Harbour	Gangavaram Port	Jagadamba Centre, Town Kotharoad, Convent, Scindia, Malkapuram, New Gajuwaka, Pedagantyada
210	Ravindranagar	Gantyada HB Colony	Venkojipalem, Appughar, Pedawaltair, Siripuram, RK Beach, Jagadamba Centre, Town Kotharoad, Convent, Scindia, Malkapuram, New Gajuwaka, Pedagantyada
68/68K	RK Beach	Simhachalam/Kothavalasa	Jagadamba Centre, RTC Complex, Maddilapalem, Hanumanthuwaka, Arilova, Mudasarlova, Adavivaram
368	RK Beach	Chodavaram	Jagadamba Centre, RTC Complex, Maddilapalem, Hanumanthuwaka, Arilova, Mudasarlova, Adavivaram, Simhachalam, Vepagunta, Sabbavaram
66V	Collectrate	Vangali	Jagadamba Centre, Town Kotharoad, Convent, Scindia, Malkapuram, New Gajuwaka, Old Gajuwaka, Kurmannapalem, Lankelapalem
