= Sri Vijaya Visakha Milk Producers Company Ltd =

Company in India

- Company type: Statutory Corporation
- Industry: Dairy, Fast-moving consumer good (FMCG)
- Founded: 1973
- Headquarters: Akkireddypalem, Visakhapatnam
- Owner: Milk Produces of Sri Vijaya Visakha Milk Producers Company Ltd
- Website: www.visakhadairy.com

Sri Vijaya Visakha Milk Producers Company Ltd (Visakha Dairy) is a company located in the Indian state of Andhra Pradesh. It sells Milk & Milk Products in the name of Visakha Dairy. It works on cooperative principles. Almost every North Coastal district in the state has milk producing co-operatives. The milk is collected from member farmers, processed and sold in the market under the brand of Visakha Dairy.

== History ==
In 1973, Vijaya Visakha Milk Producers Company Ltd was established by Adari Tulasirao In 1977, this plant reached 50,000 LPD handling capacity. In 1999, it registered as "Sri Vijaya Visakha District Milk Producers Mutually Aided Cooperative Union Ltd."

In 2006, the name of the company converted to Sri Vijaya Visakha Milk Producers Company Limited.

== Turnover ==
This dairy total turnover is ₹1100 crore in 2016 and in 2020 its crossed ₹2000 crore. it has expanded their business to Odisha, West Bengal, Chhattisgarh and Madhya Pradesh and planning to start operations in overseas.

Adari Anand Kumar was appointed as Chairman for the Visakha Dairy in January 2023.
