= Madhavadhara =

Madhavadhara మాధవధార
- Neighbourhood
- Location in Visakhapatnam
- Coordinates: 17.744948°N 83.264600°E
- Country: India
- State: Andhra Pradesh
- District: Visakhapatnam

Government
  - Body: Greater Visakhapatnam Municipal Corporation

Languages
  - Official: Telugu
- Time zone: UTC+5:30 (IST)
- PIN: 530018
- Vehicle registration: AP-31

Madhavadhara is a residential area of the city of Visakhapatnam in Andhra Pradesh state, India.

== About ==
It is one of the important residential areas in Visakhapatnam. It is surrounded by hills and natural landscape.

== Radha Madhavaswamy Temple ==
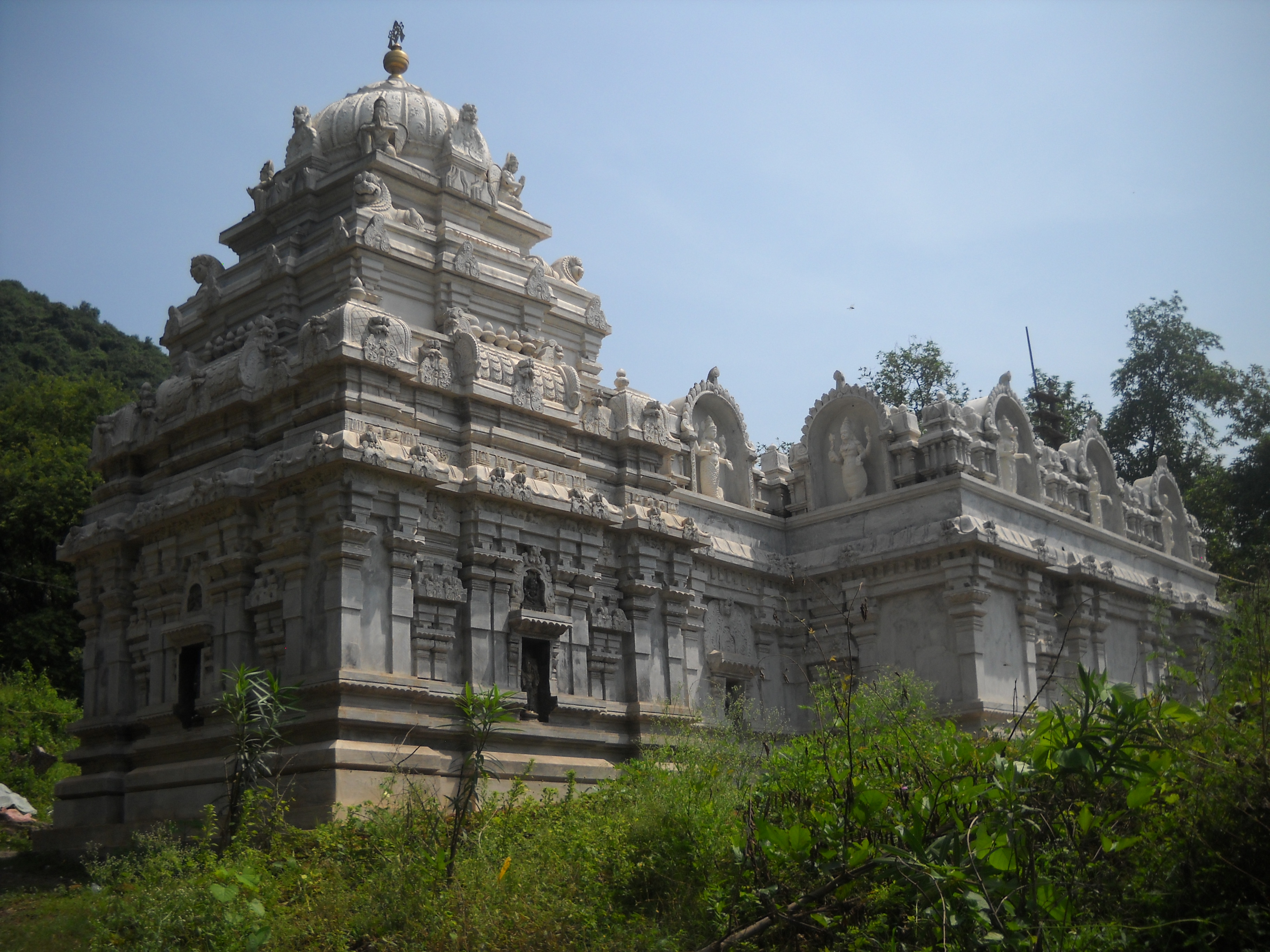
Radha Madhaswamy Temple

Madhavadhara is famous for three waterfalls Gomukhadhara, Chakradhara and Madhavadhara and the trio of temples dedicated to Lord Madhava, Lord Venugopala Swamy and Lord Siva. The temples are very ancient and there is an old trekking path from Madhavaswamy temple to Simhachalam Temple. There are also some ruins related to Buddhist stupas around the temple.

== Transport ==
It is well connected with Gajuwaka, NAD X Road, Dwaraka Nagar and other parts of the city. APSRTC buses are available in this area to connect to the core city.

APSRTC routes

Route number	Start	End	Via
48	Madhavadhara	MN Club	Muralinagar, Kailasapuram, Akkayyapalem, RTC Complex, Jagadamba Centre, Town Kotharoad
48A	Madhavadhara	Old Head Post Office	Muralinagar, Kailasapuram, Akkayyapalem, RTC Complex, Dabagardens, Town Kotharoad
