= State Highway 39 (Andhra Pradesh) =

Road in Andhra Pradesh, India

State Highway 39

Major junctions
- East end: Visakhapatnam
- West end: Araku

Location
- Country: India
- State: Andhra Pradesh

Highway system
- Roads in India; Expressways; National; State; Asian; State Highways in Andhra Pradesh

State Highway 39 connects Visakhapatnam and Araku in Andhra Pradesh. It.

== Route ==
It connects the tourist destinations in Visakhapatnam district of Andhra Pradesh like Araku and Borra Caves. It covers a distance of 112 km from Visakhapatnam to Araku and ends at Araku Valley.

Visakhapatnam→Kottavalasa→Srungavarapukota→Araku

== See also ==
- List of state highways in Andhra Pradesh
