= Seethammadhara =

- Neighbourhood
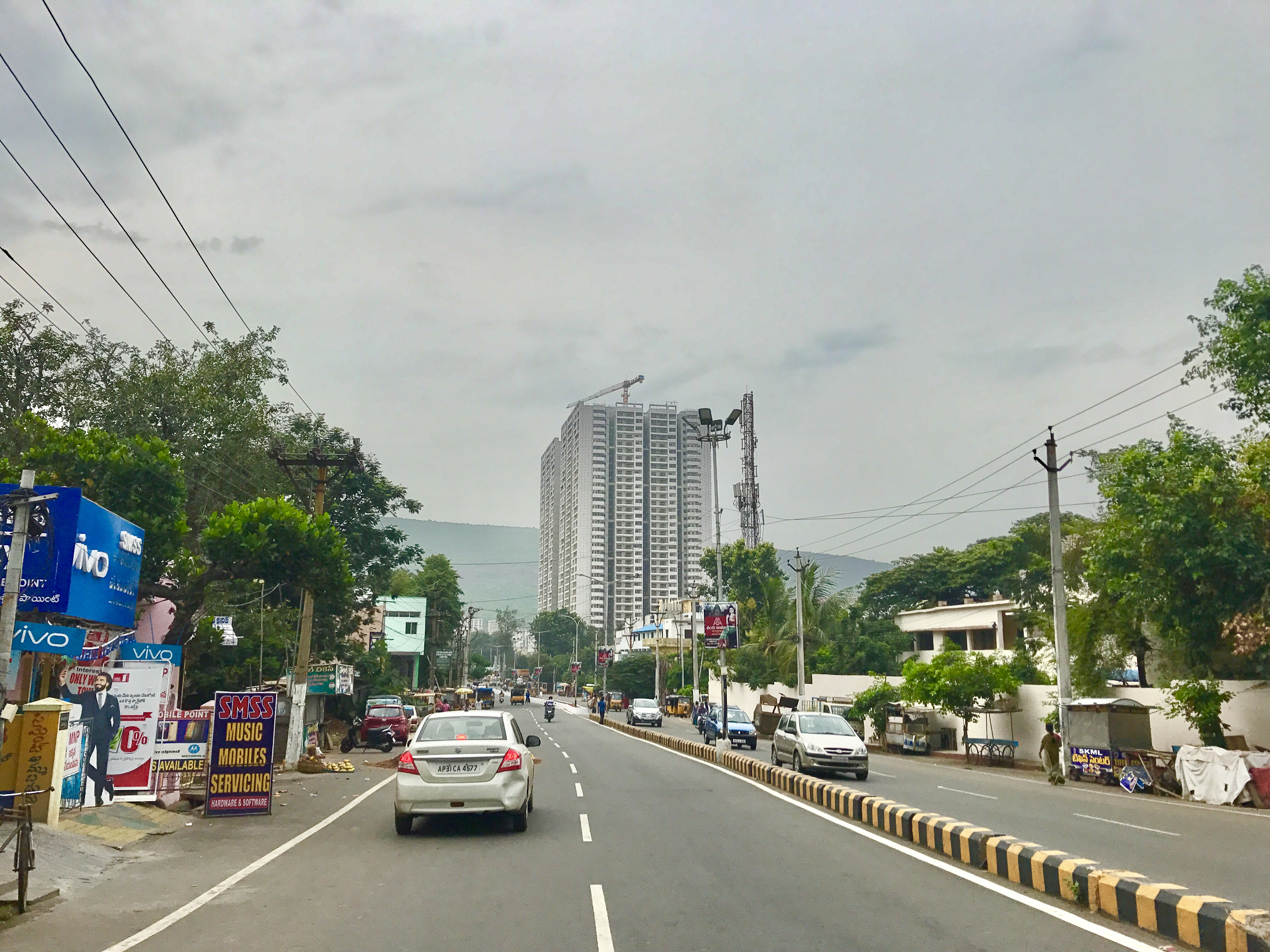
- Seethammadhara Road

- Location in Visakhapatnam
- Coordinates: 17.742457°N 83.312417°E
- Country: India
- State: Andhra Pradesh
- District: Visakhapatnam
- Founder: Government of Andhra Pradesh

Government
  - Type: Mayor-council
  - Body: Greater Visakhapatnam Municipal Corporation

Languages
  - Official: Telugu
- Time zone: UTC+5:30 (IST)
- PIN: 530013
- Vehicle Registration: AP31 (Former); AP39 (from 30 January 2019)
- Vidhan Sabha constituency: Visakhapatnam North
- Lok Sabha constituency: Visakhapatnam

Seethammadhara is a neighborhood in the city of Visakhapatnam, India. The neighborhood is considered as the major residential area in the district. It is located within the jurisdiction of the Greater Visakhapatnam Municipal Corporation, which is responsible for the civic amenities in Seethammadhara. It is located in the central of Visakhapatnam city. Seethammadhara mandal is one of the 46 mandals of Visakhapatnam District. It is under the administration of Visakhapatnam revenue division and the headquarters is located at Seethammadhara. The Mandal is bounded by Gopalapatnam, Maharanipeta and Bheemunipatnam mandals.

== Wards ==
Seethammadara Mandal consists of following wards

1. Allipuram Extension ward
2. Chinna Waltair
3. Dondaparthi
4. Maddilapalem
5. Pedda Waltair
6. Resapuvanipalem
7. Venkojipalem

== Location and geography ==
Seethammadara is located about 12 km from Visakhapatnam Airport and about 6 km from Visakhapatnam railway station. It lies to the north-west of Visakhapatnam City and is loosely bordered by Maddilapalem to the south and MVP Colony to the east, Gopalapatnam to the west, Maharanipeta to the south-east.

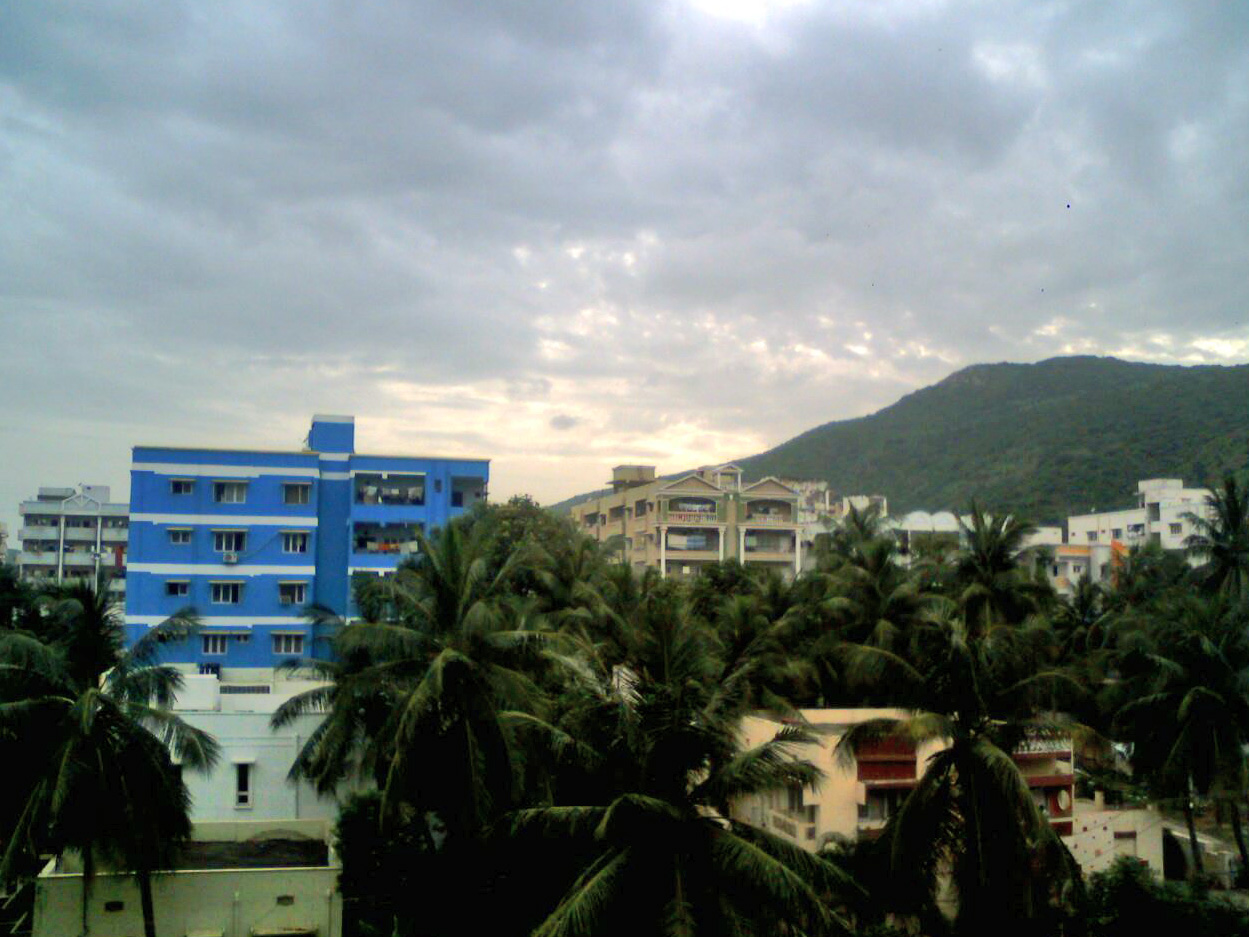
View at Seethammadhara in Visakhapatnam.

== Hospitals ==
The nearest major hospitals to Seethammadhara are Queens NRI Hospital, NRI Hospital, and Lions Cancer Hospital which is well known for the cancer treatment facilities available.

== Real estate ==
Lansum Oxygen Towers is a tallest skyscraper in Visakhapatnam. It has 35 floors.

== Transport ==
Seethammadhara is well connected to most locations of the city by the state-owned bus service, APSRTC. Apart from the city buses many RTC and private operators run inter-city buses with Seethammadhara as a starting point.

APSRTC routes

Route number	Start	End	Via
20A	HB Colony	Old Head Post Office	Seethammadhara, Satyam Junction, Gurudwara, RTC Complex, Jagadamaba Centre, Town Kotharoad
20	North Extension Colony	Old Head Post Office	Seethammadhara, Satyam Junction, Gurudwara, RTC Complex, Jagadamaba Centre, Town Kotharoad
69	Arilova Colony	Railway Station	Pedagadili, Hanumanthuwaka, Venkojipalem, HB Colony, Seethammadhara, Satyam Junction, Gurudwara, RTC Complex
