= Chinagantyada =

- Neighbourhood
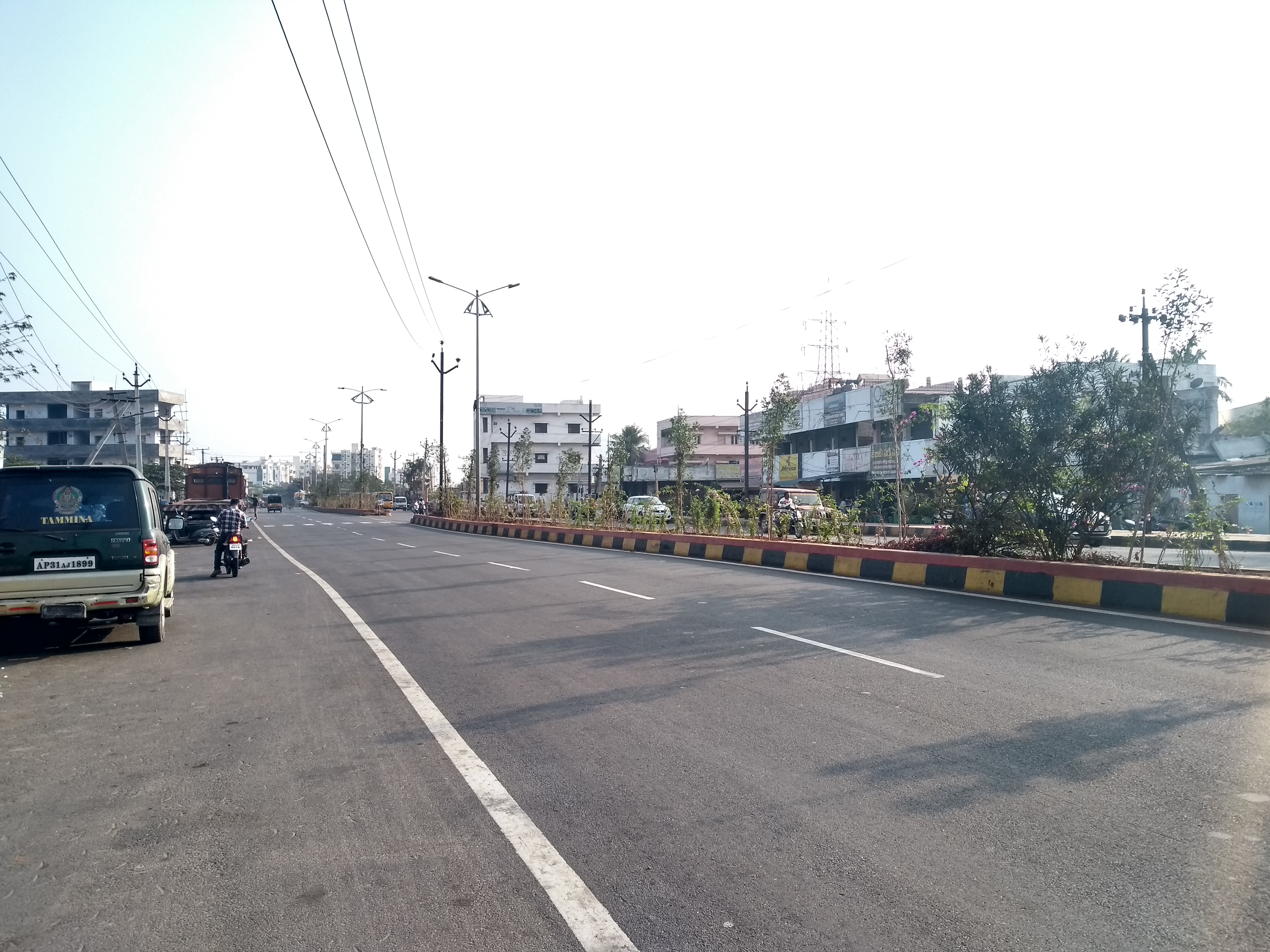
- 100 feet road

- Location in Visakhapatnam
- Coordinates: 17.680569°N 83.189938°E
- Country: India
- State: Andhra Pradesh
- District: Visakhapatnam

Government
  - Body: Greater Visakhapatnam Municipal Corporation

Languages
  - Official: Telugu
- Time zone: UTC+5:30 (IST)
- PIN: 530026
- Vehicle registration: AP-31,32

Chinagantyada is a neighborhood situated on the Visakhapatnam City, India. The area, which falls under the local administrative limits of Greater Visakhapatnam Municipal Corporation, .

== Transport ==
APSRTC routes

Route number	Start	End	Via
400K	Kurmannapalem	RTC Complex	Old Gajuwaka, New Gajuwaka, Sriharipuram, Malkapuram, Scindia, Naval Dockyard, Visakhapatnam Railway Station
99K	Kurmannapalem	R.K.Beach	Old Gajuwaka, New Gajuwaka, Sriharipuram, Malkapuram, Scindia, Naval Dockyard, Old Post Office, Jagadamba, Maharanipeta
38K	Kurmannaplem	RTC Complex	BHPV, Airport, NAD Kotharoad, Birla Junction, Gurudwar
38T	Steel Plant	RTC Complex	Kurmannapalem, Old Gajuwaka, BHPV, Airport, NAD Kotharoad, Birla Junction, Gurudwar
111	Kurmannapalem	Tagarapuvalasa	Old Gajuwaka, BHPV, Airport, NAD Kotharoad, Birla Junction, Gurudwar, Maddilapalem, Hanumanthuwaka, Yendada, Madhurawada, Anandapuram
600	Scindia	Anakapalle	Lankelapalem, Kurmannapalem, Old Gajuwaka, New Gajuwaka, Sriharipuram, Malkapuram
38Y	Duvvada Railway Station	RTC Complex	Kurmannaplem, Old Gajuwaka, BHPV, Airport, NAD Kotharoad, Birla Junction, Gurudwar
404	Steelplant Main Gate	PM Palem	Old Gajuwaka, BHPV, Airport, NAD Kotharoad, Birla Junction, Gurudwar, Maddilapalem, Hanumanthuwaka, Yendada
