= Sheela Nagar =

- Neighbourhood
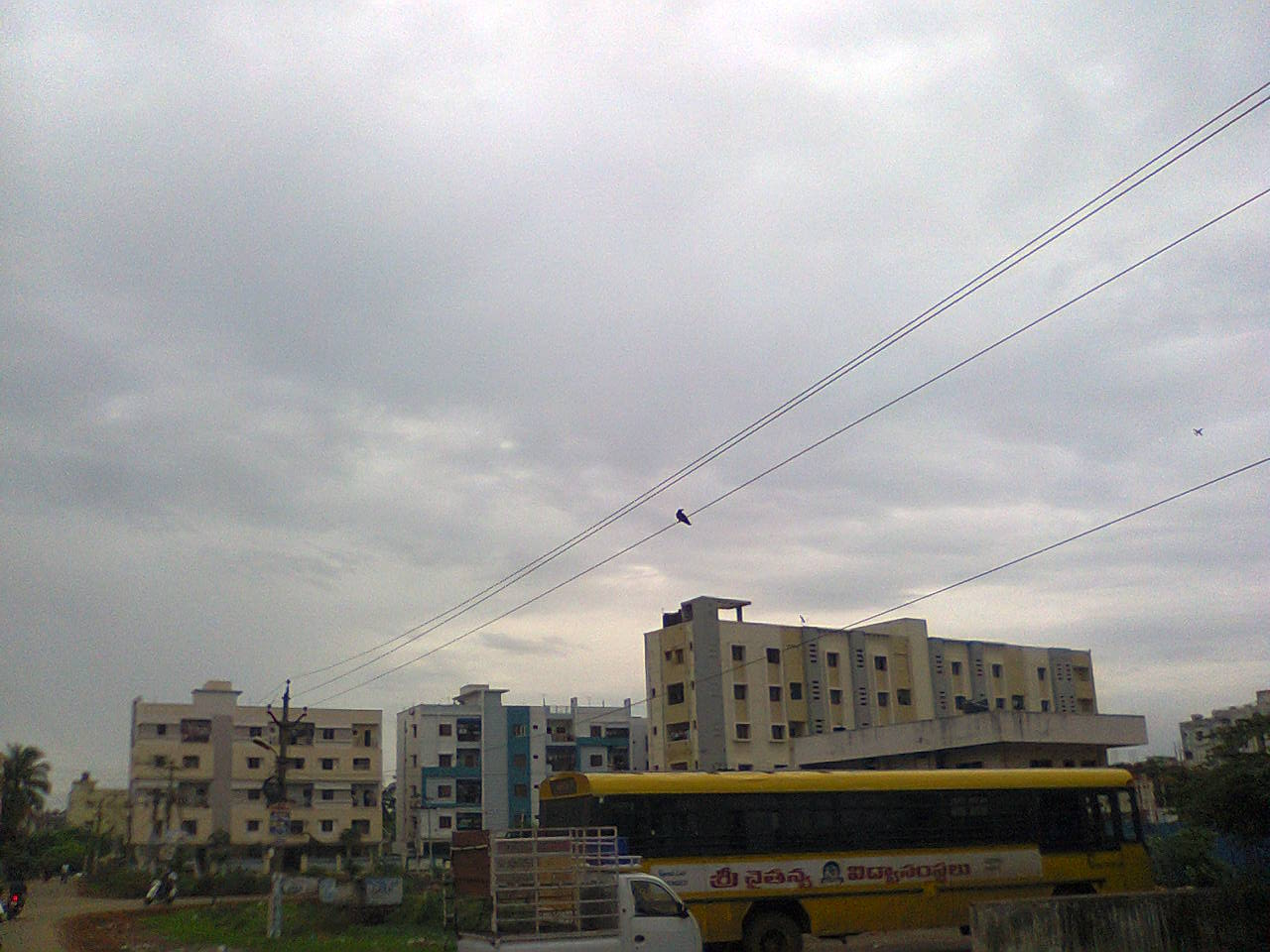
- Apartments in Sheela Nagar

- Location in Visakhapatnam
- Coordinates: 17.718959°N 83.202347°E
- Country: India
- State: Andhra Pradesh
- District: Visakhapatnam

Government
  - Body: Greater Visakhapatnam Municipal Corporation

Languages
  - Official: Telugu
- Time zone: UTC+5:30 (IST)
- PIN: 530056

Sheela Nagar is a neighborhood in the southern part of Visakhapatnam City, India. It is under the local administrative limits of Greater Visakhapatnam Municipal Corporation, located about 13 km from the Visakhapatnam Railway Station and about 4 km from INS Dega.

== About ==
Sheela Nagar contains many large residential complexes. Sheela Nagar has the scope for very high development as it is surrounded by major areas like Gajuwaka and NAD X Road. The basic infrastructure like the roads, sewage and drinking water are better comparative to most other parts of the Visakhapatnam City. GVMC has taken over the Sheela Nagar area and bringing in the amenities needed like road, sewage and drinking water.

== Real estate ==
There is a huge demand for land now in Sheela Nagar. Also, land prices are high in this area. Recently employees of PSUs like ONGC, HPCL, VSP, NaPrVa are investing in this area.

== Places of worship ==
Some of the famous temples in this area are Ayappa Swamy Temple.

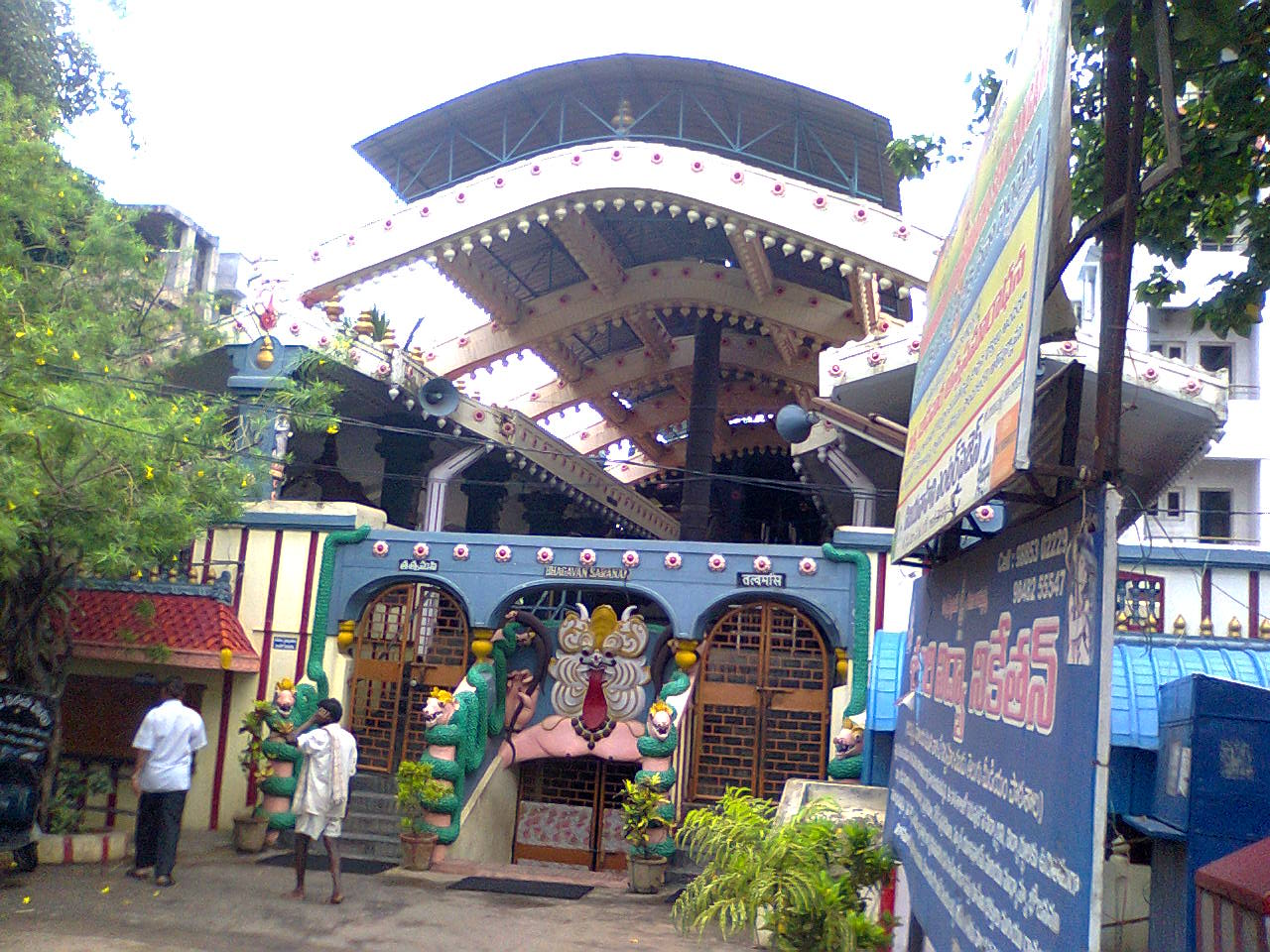
Ayappa Swamy Temple

== Education ==
There are a good number of schools and colleges for all budgets.

== Entertainment ==
There is a multiplex called STBL Cineworld for entertainment. Screen-1 is drive in theater first time in both telugu states. Screen-2 is an indoor theatre and screen-3 is container theater.

== Transport ==
APSRTC runs the buses to this suburb, connecting it to all parts of the city. Sheela Nagar is well connected to Gajuwaka, NAD X Road, Kancharapalem and RTC Complex.

APSRTC routes:

Route number	Start	End	Via
38	Gajuwaka	RTC Complex	BHPV, Airport, NAD Kotharoad, Birla Junction, Gurudwar
38K	Kurmannapalem	RTC Complex	Old Gajuwaka, BHPV, Airport, NAD Kotharoad, Birla Junction, Gurudwar
38H	Gantyada HB Colony	RTC Complex	Pedagantyada, New Gajuwaka, Old Gajuwaka, BHPV, Airport, NAD Kotharoad, Birla Junction, Gurudwar
38T	Steel Plant	RTC Complex	Kurmannapalem, Old Gajuwaka, BHPV, Airport, NAD Kotharoad, Birla Junction, Gurudwar
38D	Nadupuru	RTC Complex	Pedagantyada, New Gajuwaka, Old Gajuwaka, BHPV, Airport, NAD Kotharoad, Birla Junction, Gurudwar
38J	Janata Colony	RTC Complex	Sriharipuram, New Gajuwaka, Old Gajuwaka, BHPV, Airport, NAD Kotharoad, Birla Junction, Gurudwar
38Y	Duvvada Railway Station	RTC Complex	Kurmannaplem, Old Gajuwaka, BHPV, Airport, NAD Kotharoad, Birla Junction, Gurudwar
55	Scindia	Simhachalam	Malkapuram, New Gajuwaka, Old Gajuwaka, BHPV, Airport, NAD Kotharoad, Gopalapatnam
55K	Scindia	Kothavalasa	Malkapuram, New Gajuwaka, Old Gajuwaka, BHPV, Airport, NAD Kotharoad, Gopalapatnam, Vepagunta, Pendurthi
111	Kurmannapalem	Tagarapuvalasa	Old Gajuwaka, BHPV, NAD Kotharoad, Gurudwar, Maddilapalem, Hanumanthuwaka, Madhurawada, Anandapuram
