= Gopalapatnam =

- Neighbourhood
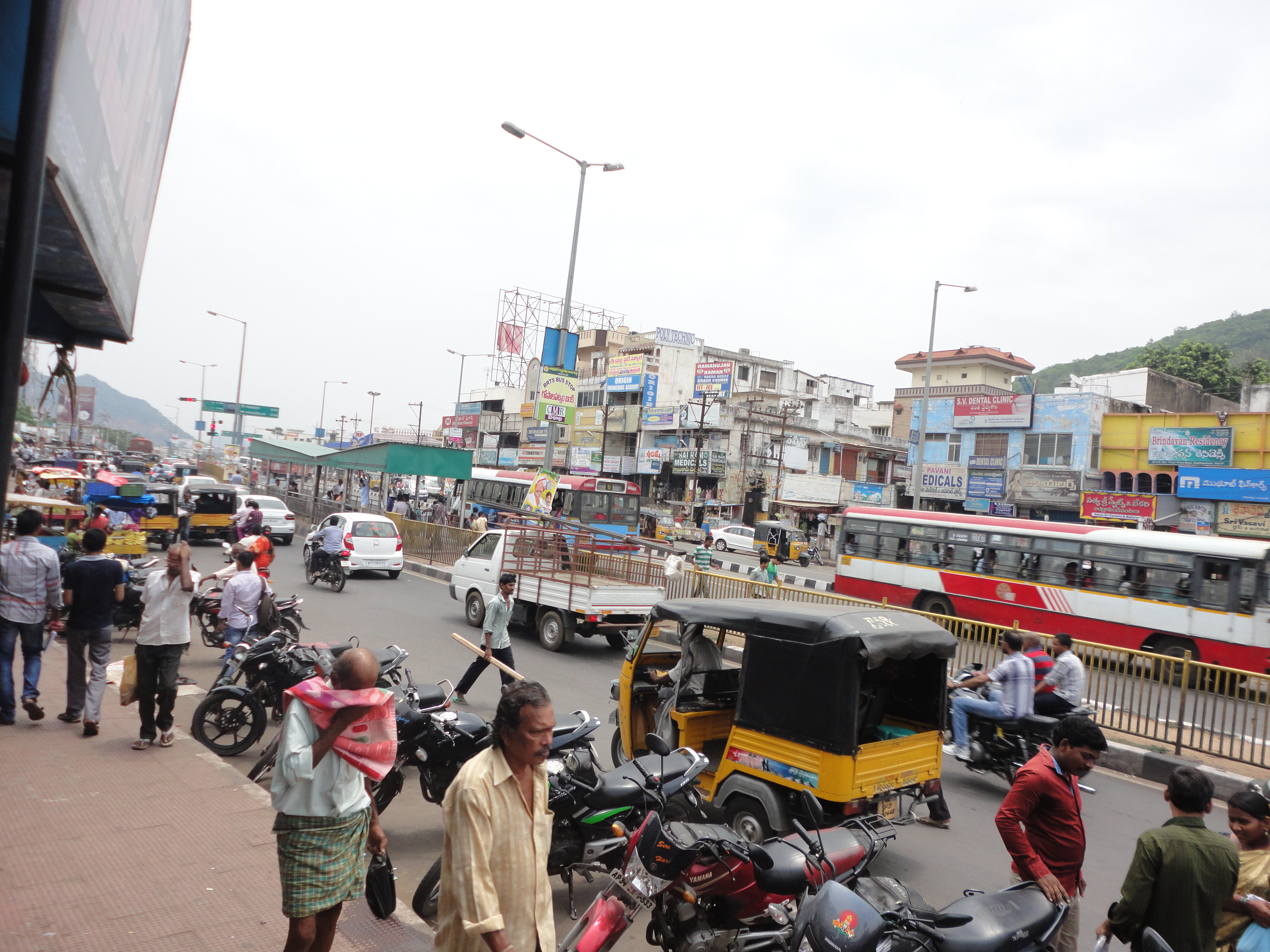
- BRTS Road at Gopalapatnam

- Location in Visakhapatnam
- Coordinates: 17.748066°N 83.218745°E
- Country: India
- State: Andhra Pradesh
- District: Visakhapatnam
- Founder: Government of Andhra Pradesh

Government
  - Type: Mayor-council
  - Body: GVMC

Languages
  - Official: Telugu
- Time zone: UTC+5:30 (IST)
- PIN: 530027
- Vidhan Sabha constituency: Visakhapatnam West
- Lok Sabha constituency: Visakhapatnam

Gopalapatnam is a neighborhood in the city of Visakhapatnam, India. The neighborhood is considered to be the major residential and commercial area in the district. It is located within the jurisdiction of the Greater Visakhapatnam Municipal Corporation, which is responsible for the area's civic amenities. It is located on the western fringe of Visakhapatnam. The Visakhapatnam gas leak occurred in the neighborhood on 7 May 2020.

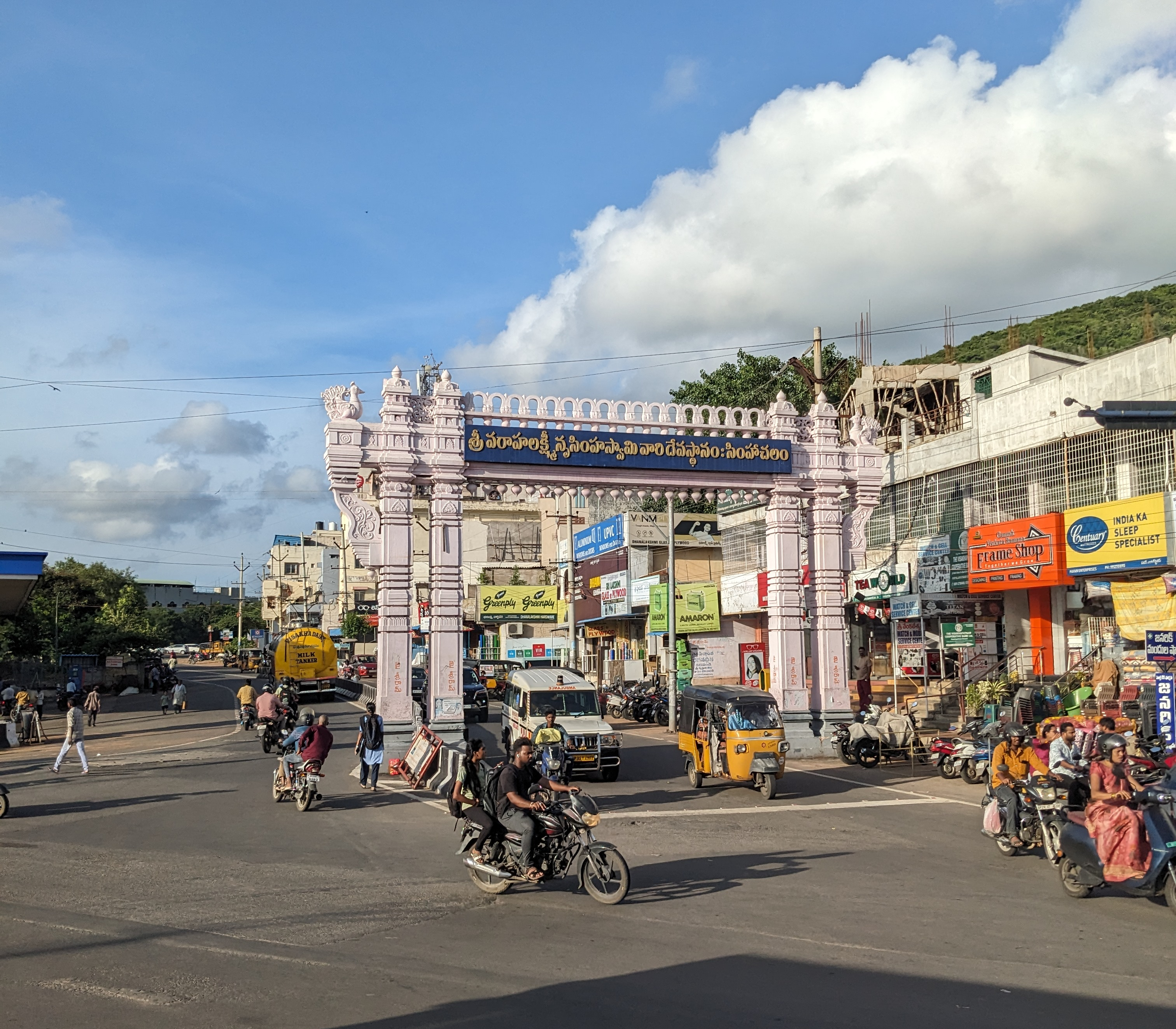
Simhachalam arch at gopalapatnam

The Gopalapatnam Mandal is one of the 46 mandals of the Visakhapatnam District. It is under the administration of the Visakhapatnam Revenue Division, which is headquartered in Gopalapatnam. The Mandal is neighbored by the Gajuwaka, Seethammadhara, and Pendurthi mandals.

== Wards ==
The Gopalapatnam Mandal consists of the following wards:

1. Butchirajpalem
2. Gopalapatnam
3. Kancharapalem
4. Kapparada
5. Madhavadhara
6. Marripalem
7. Pullambatlapalem
8. Venkatapuram

== Location and geography ==
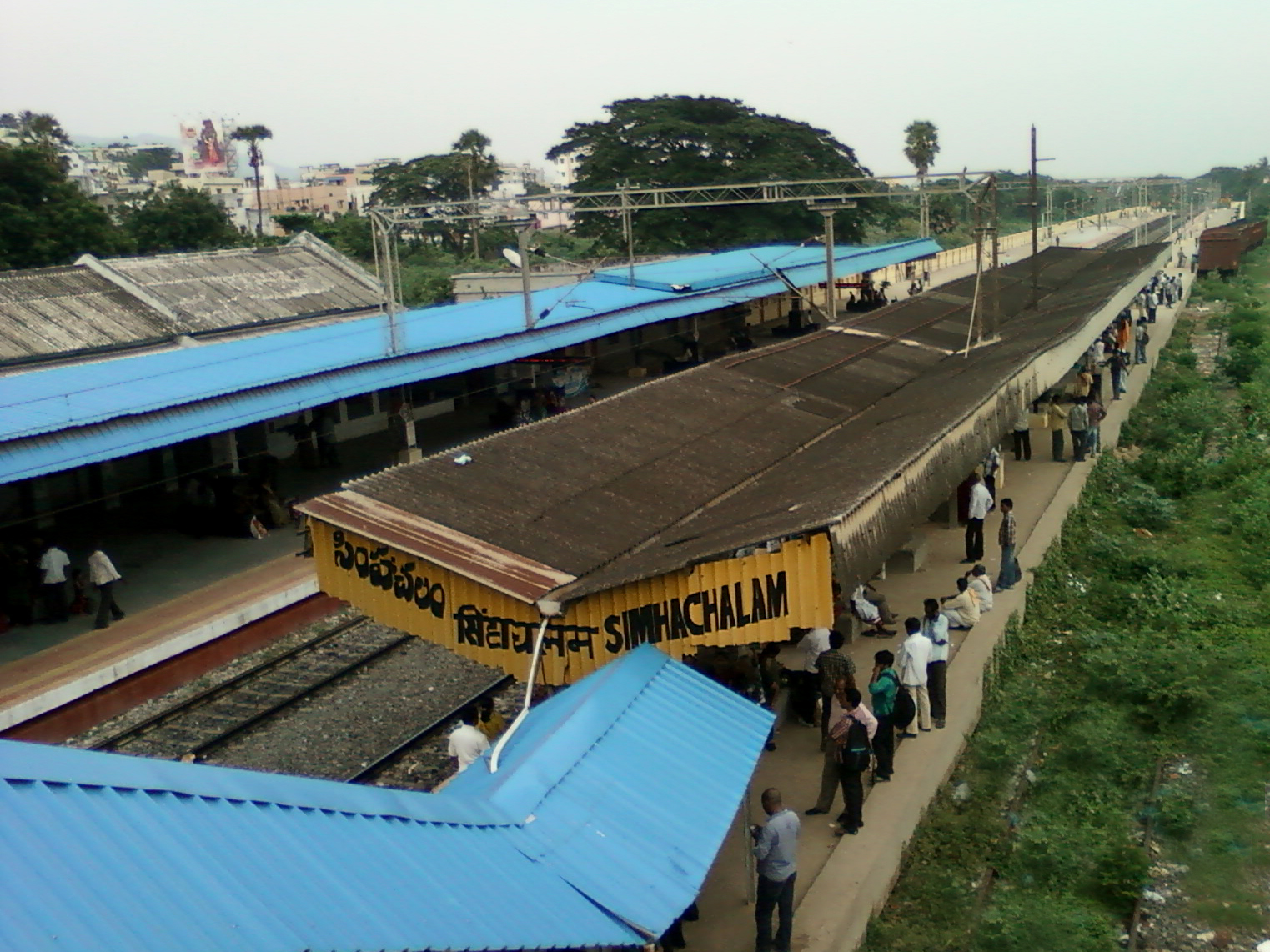
Simhachalam Railway station

Gopalapatnam is located around 4 km from INS Dega and around 8 km from the Visakhapatnam Railway Station. The neighborhood is served by the Waltair Division's Simhachalam Railway Station. The station is located at the center of the neighborhood connecting the Highways NH-16 and SH-39.

Gopalapatnam lies to the west of Visakhapatnam City and is loosely bordered by Gajuwaka to the south and Seethammadhara to the north, Pendurthi to the west, and Marripalem to the east.

== Etymology ==
Gopalapatnam was named after Sri Gopala Raju. He once ruled the areas of Kota Gutta, Enugula Dwaram, Gurrala Cheruvu, and Taati Penda, which were later united to form the present Gopalapatnam.

== Industry ==
LG Polymers operates a 200-acre styrene plant in the RR Venkatapuram village near Gopalapatnam, which was the site of the Visakhapatnam gas leak.

== Transport ==
Gopalapatnam is well connected by road, with NH16 and SH39 passing through the mandal. It also has major district roads connecting it to nearby mandals and Visakhapatnam. The APSRTC runs bus services from the Gopalapatnam bus station to major parts of the state and Visakhapatnam.
