= Pedagantyada =

- Neighbourhood
- Location in Visakhapatnam
- Coordinates: 17.6615°N 83.2104°E
- Country: India
- State: Andhra Pradesh
- District: Visakhapatnam
- Founder: Government of Andhra Pradesh

Government
  - Type: Mayor-council
  - Body: Greater Visakhapatnam Municipal Corporation

Area
  - Total: 52.50 km^{2} (20.27 sq mi)

Population (2011)
  - Total: 95,291

Languages
  - Official: Telugu
- Time zone: UTC+5:30 (IST)
- PIN: 530044
- Vehicle Registration: AP31 (Former); AP39 (from 30 January 2019)
- Lok Sabha constituency: Visakhapatnam
- Vidhan Sabha constituency: Gajuwaka

Pedagantyada is a neighbourhood in the city of Visakhapatnam, India. It is one of the 46 mandals in Visakhapatnam District. It is under the administration of Visakhapatnam revenue division and the headquarters is located at Pedagantyada beside Gajuwaka. The Mandal is bounded by Mulagada and Gajuwaka mandals. It is a major Suburb in Visakhapatnam and got merged in Greater Visakhapatnam Municipal Corporation in 2005. Organisations like Visakhapatnam Steel Plant, and Gangavaram Port are located in this area.

== Location and geography ==
Pedagantyada is located about 11 km from Visakhapatnam Airport and about 17 km from Visakhapatnam railway station. It lies to the south of Visakhapatnam City and is loosely bordered by Gajuwaka to the west and Parawada to the south, Mulagada to the north, Anakapalle to the southwest, Bay of Bengal to the east.

== Transport ==
Pedagantyada is well connected by road. It has major District roads connecting it to nearby mandals and Visakhapatnam city. APSRTC runs bus services from Gajuwaka bus station to major parts of the city.

APSRTC routes

| Route number | Start | End | Via |
|---|---|---|---|
| 38D | Nadupuru Dairy Colony | RTC Complex | Pedagantyada, New Gajuwaka, Old Gajuwaka, BHPV, Airport, NAD Junction, Birla Junction, Gurudwar |
| 38H | Gantyada HB Colony | RTC Complex | Pedagantyada, New Gajuwaka, Old Gajuwaka, BHPV, Airport, NAD Junction, Birla Junction, Gurudwar |
| 400H | Gantyada HB Colony | Maddilapalem | Pedagantyada, New Gajuwaka, Malkapuram, Scindia, Railway Station, RTC Complex |
| 63 | Gangavaram Port | RK Beach | Pedagantyada, New Gajuwaka, Malkapuram, Scindia, Convent, Town Kotharoad, Jagadamba Centre |
| 210 | Gantyada HB Colony | Ravindra Nagar | Pedagantyada, New Gajuwaka, Malkapuram, Scindia, Convent, Town Kotharoad, Jagadamba, RK Beach, Siripuram, Peda Waltair, Appughar, Hanumanthuwaka |
| 65F | Gangavaram Port | Fishing Harbour | Pedagantyada, New Gajuwaka, Malkapuram, Scindia, Convent, Town Kotharoad, Jagadamba Centre, Collectorate |

== Organisations ==
Organisations like Visakhapatnam Steel Plant and Gangavaram Port are located in this area.

=== Visakhapatnam Steel Plant ===
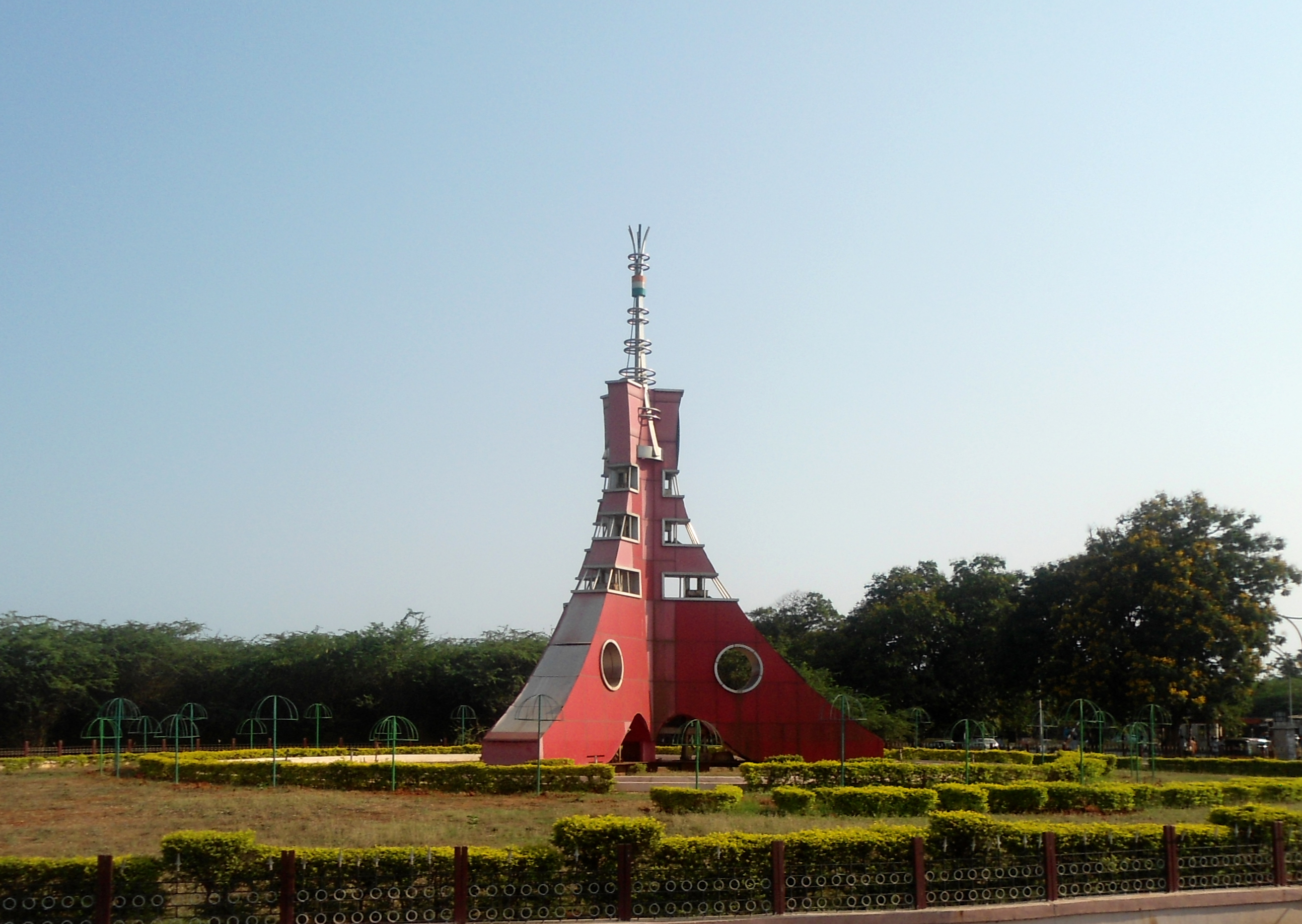
Pylon at Vizag Steel Plant

Visakhapatnam Steel Plant, popularly known as Vizag Steel (Telugu: విశాఖ ఉక్కు కర్మాగారం), is an integrated steel producer in Visakhapatnam, India built using German and Soviet technology. The company has grown from a loss-making industry to 3-billion-dollar turnover company registering a growth of 203.6% in just four years. Vizag Steel Plant was conferred Navratna status on 17 November 2010.

On 17 April 1970, the then Prime Minister of India, the late Indira Gandhi, announced the government's decision in the Parliament to establish a steel plant at Visakhapatnam. Planning started by appointing site selection committee in June 1970 and subsequently the committee's report was approved. On 20 January 1971, Gandhi laid the foundation stone of the plant.

=== Gangavaram Port ===
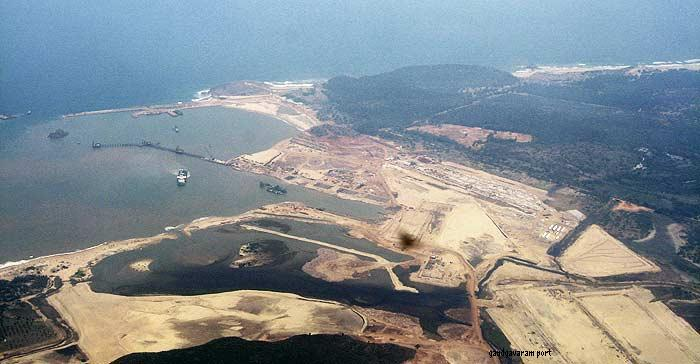
Gangavaram port view

Gangavaram Port, located in Visakhapatnam, Andhra Pradesh, is India's deepest port. Inaugurated in July 2009, it has a depth of 21m. It is managed by Gangavaram Port Ltd. The first client of the Gangavaram Port Ltd. is the Rashtriya Ispat Nigam Ltd., which runs the Vizag Steel Plant, and earlier used the Visakhapatnam Port. The Gangavaram Port Ltd. plans to build conveyors for taking imported raw materials directly to the Vizag Steel plant, in order to reduce the railway transportation costs.
