= Visakhapatnam West Assembly constituency =

Constituency of the Andhra Pradesh Legislative Assembly, India

Coordinates: 17.70°N 83.23°E

Visakhapatnam West
- Constituency No. 24 for the Andhra Pradesh Legislative Assembly
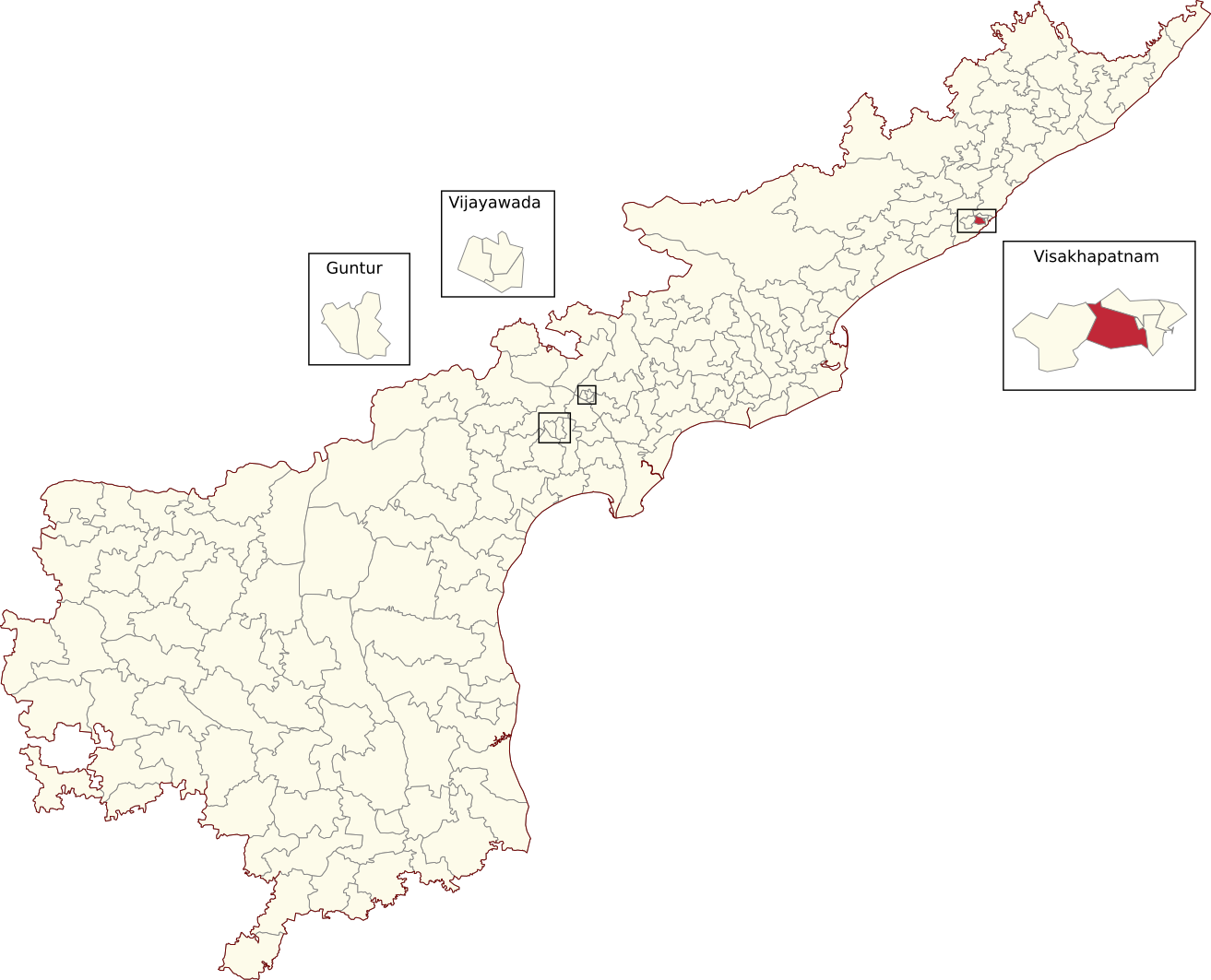
- Location of Visakhapatnam West Assembly constituency within Andhra Pradesh

Constituency details
- Country: India
- Region: South India
- State: Andhra Pradesh
- District: Visakhapatnam
- Lok Sabha constituency: Visakhapatnam
- Established: 2008
- Total electors: 236,310
- Reservation: None

Member of Legislative Assembly
- 16th Andhra Pradesh Legislative Assembly
- Incumbent Gana Babu
- Party: TDP
- Alliance: NDA
- Elected year: 2024

Visakhapatnam West Assembly constituency is a constituency in Visakhapatnam district of Andhra Pradesh that elects representatives to the Andhra Pradesh Legislative Assembly in India. It is one of the seven assembly segments of Visakhapatnam Lok Sabha constituency.

Gana Venkata Reddy Naidu Pethakamsetti (Gana Babu) is the current MLA of the constituency, having won the 2019 Andhra Pradesh Legislative Assembly election from Telugu Desam Party. As of 2019, there are a total of 236,310 electors in the constituency. The constituency was established in 2008, as per the Delimitation Orders (2008).

== Mandals ==
The mandal and wards that form the assembly constituency are: Visakhapatnam (M.Corp) Ward No. 35 and 56 to 71, of the Visakhapatnam (Urban) Mandal.

== Members of the Legislative Assembly ==
Year	Member	Political party
2009	Malla Vijaya Prasad	Indian National Congress
2014	Gana Babu	Telugu Desam Party
2019	Gana Babu	Telugu Desam Party
2024	Gana Babu	Telugu Desam Party

== Election results ==
=== 2009 ===
2009 Andhra Pradesh Legislative Assembly election: Visakhapatnam West
Party	Candidate	Votes	%	±%
INC	Malla Vijaya Prasad	45,018	38.81	
PRP	P.G.V.R. Naidu	40,874	35.24	
TDP	Gudivada Nagamani	17,775	15.32	
LSP	Govardhan Reddi Avula	5,502	4.82	
Majority		4,144	3.57	
Turnout		115,977	69.90	
INC win (new seat)				

=== 2014 ===
2014 Andhra Pradesh Legislative Assembly election: Visakhapatnam West
Party	Candidate	Votes	%	±%
TDP	P.G.V.R. Naidu	76,791	56.66	
YSRCP	Dadi Ratnakar	45,934	33.89	
Majority		30,857	22.77	
Turnout		135,523	59.78	−10.12
TDP gain from INC		Swing		

=== 2019 ===
2019 Andhra Pradesh Legislative Assembly election: Visakhapatnam West
Party	Candidate	Votes	%	±%
TDP	P.G.V.R. Naidu	68,699	50.96	
YSRCP	Malla Vijaya Prasad	49,718	36.88	
CPI	J.V. Satyanarayana Murthy	6,464	4.79	
Majority		18,981	14.08	
Turnout				
TDP hold		Swing		

=== 2024 ===
2024 Andhra Pradesh Legislative Assembly election: Visakhapatnam West
Party	Candidate	Votes	%	±%
TDP	P.G.V.R. Naidu	90,805	60.13	
YSRCP	Adari Anand Kumar	55621	36.83	
BSP	ATHUKUMSETTI RAMA CHANDRA RAO	1157	0.77	
NOTA	NOTA	1002	0.66	
Majority		35184		
Turnout		151008		
TDP hold		Swing		

== See also ==
- List of constituencies of the Andhra Pradesh Legislative Assembly
