= Visakhapatnam revenue division =

Coordinates: 15°54′N 80°40′E

Visakhapatnam Revenue Division
- revenue division in Visakhapatnam district
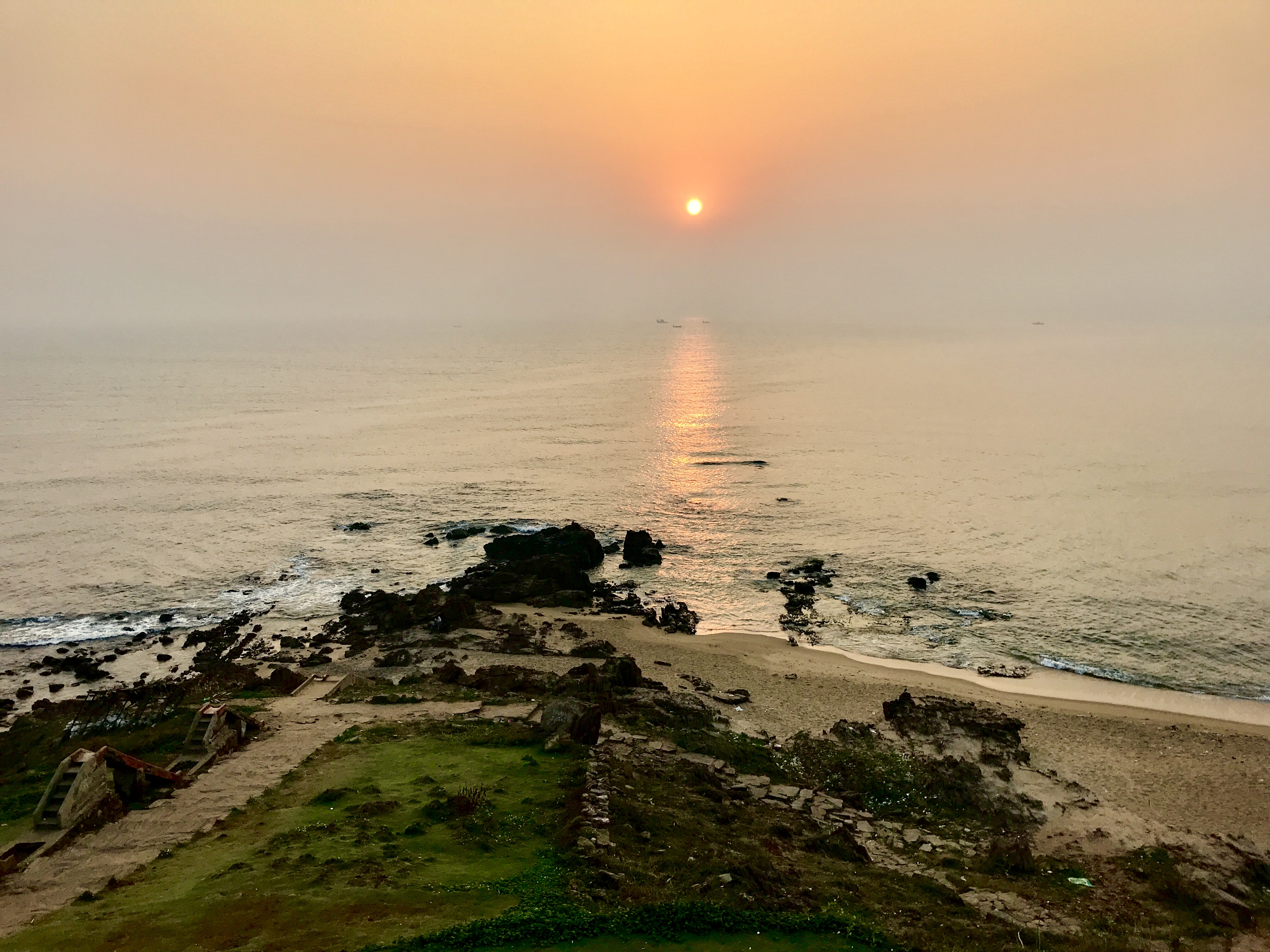
- Tenneti Park at sunrise

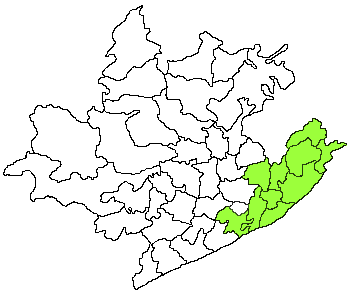
- Visakhapatnam revenue division in Visakhapatnam district
- Country: India
- State: Andhra Pradesh
- District: Visakhapatnam

Visakhapatnam Revenue Division (or Visakhapatnam division) is an administrative division in the Visakhapatnam district of the Indian state of Andhra Pradesh. It is one of the two revenue divisions managing the district's six mandals. The city of Visakhapatnam is the divisional headquarters.

== Administration ==
There are 6 mandals under the administration of Visakhapatnam revenue division. They are:

No.	Mandal
1	Gajuwaka
2	Pedagantyada
3	Gopalapatnam
4	Mulagada
5	Maharanipeta
6	Pendurthi

== Demographics ==
The division has a population of 21,05,043 as of the 2011 census. Rural population is 3,17,320 while urban population was 17,87,723. Scheduled Castes and Scheduled Tribes make up 8.17% and 1.14% of the population respectively.

Hindus are 93.36% of the population while Muslims are 3.29% and Christians are 2.67%.

At the time of the 2011 census, 93.23% of the population spoke Telugu, 2.33% Urdu and 1.87% Hindi as their first language.

== See also ==
- List of revenue divisions in Andhra Pradesh
- List of mandals in Andhra Pradesh
