= Gajuwaka =

- Neighbourhood
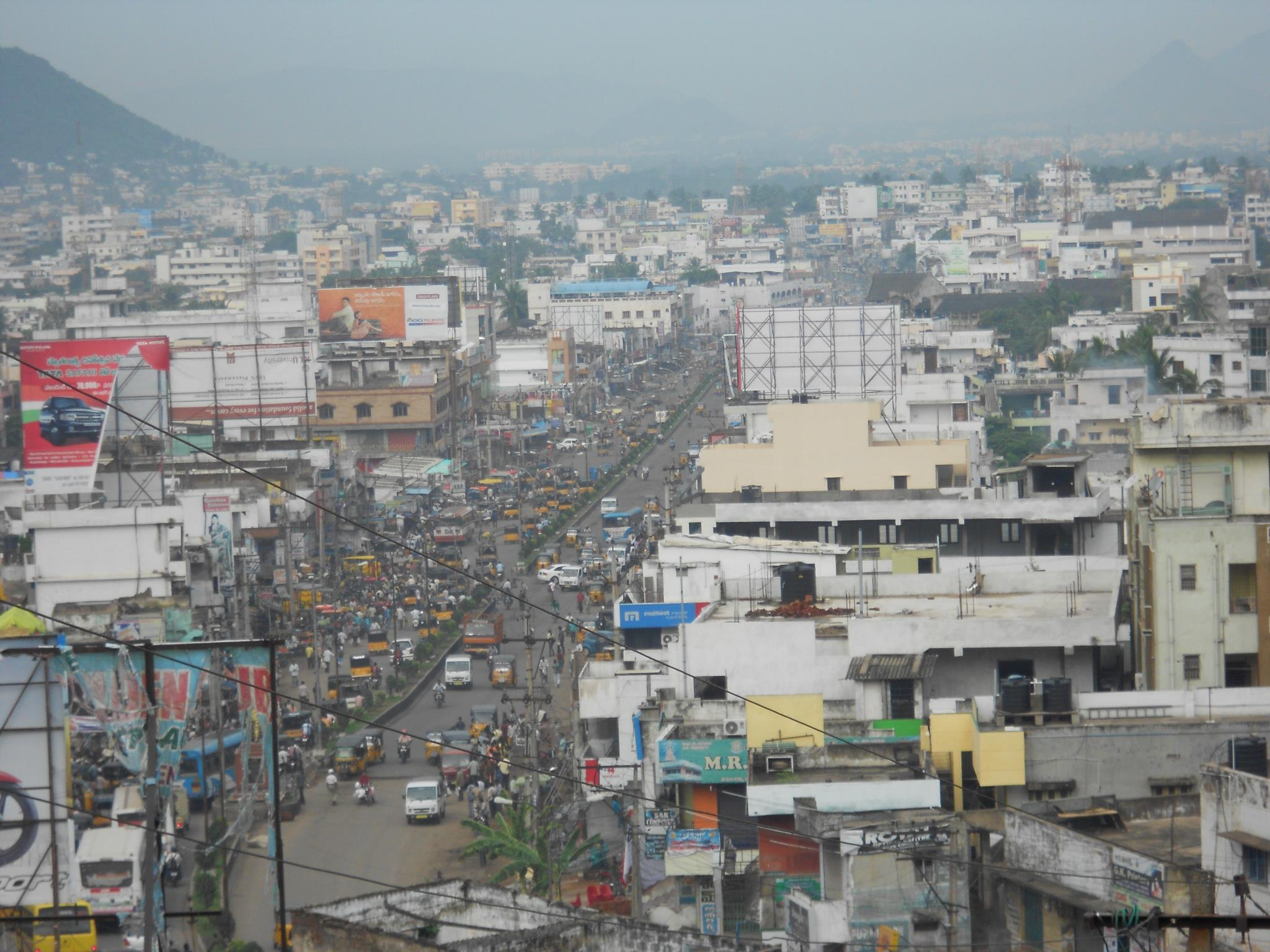
- Skyline of Gajuwaka area

- Location in Visakhapatnam
- Coordinates: 17.7°N 83.2167°E
- Country: India
- State: Andhra Pradesh
- City: Visakhapatnam
- Founder: Government of Andhra Pradesh

Government
  - Type: Mayor-council
  - Body: GVMC
  - MLA: Palla Srinivasa Rao

Area
  - Total: 138.87 km^{2} (53.62 sq mi)

Population (2014)
  - Total: 422,018
  - Density: 3,038.9/km^{2} (7,870.8/sq mi)

Languages
  - Official: Telugu
- Time zone: UTC+5:30 (IST)
- PIN: 530026
- Vehicle Registration: AP31 (Former); AP39 (from 30 January 2019)
- Vidhan Sabha constituency: Gajuwaka
- Lok Sabha constituency: Visakhapatnam

Gajuwaka is a major residential area of Visakhapatnam City, India. This neighborhood of Visakhapatnam is considered the biggest shopping district in Andhra Pradesh by revenue. Though conceived as a residential locality, it is now one of the principal shopping districts of the city. The Gajuwaka area of Visakhapatnam has the highest per capita income in Andhra Pradesh.

Gajuwaka mandal is one of the 46 mandals of Visakhapatnam District. It is under the administration of Visakhapatnam revenue division and the headquarters is located at Chinagantyada, Gajuwaka. The Mandal is bounded by Pedagantyada, Mulagada and Gopalapatnam mandals. On 21 November 2005, the Gajuwaka Municipality was merged into the Greater Visakhapatnam Municipal Corporation.

== Economy ==
Since most of the heavy industries established in Visakhapatnam, like Hindustan Petroleum Corporation Limited, Visakhapatnam Steel Plant and Gangavaram Port lie in close proximity of Gajuwaka, its growth has mirrored that of Visakhapatnam.

Gajuwaka is one of the busiest shopping districts of Andhra Pradesh. The neighborhood is considered to be the biggest shopping district in the state by revenue. There are a number of apparel, jewelry, and utensil stores based in Gajuwaka. Several hotels and restaurants including Best Western Ramachandra, Paradise Food Court, and many other food court chains have emerged within a 5–10 year span. Major national and international jewellery brands have also established their presence in the area, including MNC brand Malabar Gold & Diamonds, along with prominent Indian jewellers such as Khazana, GRT, Joy Alukkas, and other regional players.

== Etymology ==
The name Gajuwaka is derived from the words "Gaja" (Elephant) and "Vaagu" (Pond).

== Location and geography ==
Gajuwaka is located about 8 km from INS Dega and about 12–13 km from Visakhapatnam railway station. It lies in the south west of Visakhapatnam City and is loosely bordered by Pedagantyada to the south and Anakapalle to the east, Sabbavaram to the northwest, Gopalapatnam to the north, Mulagada to the east.

== Demographics ==
As of 2001 India census, Gajuwaka had a population of 259,944. Males constitute 52% of the population and females 48%. Gajuwaka has an average literacy rate of 70%, higher than the national average of 59.5%: male literacy is 77%, and female literacy is 63%. In Gajuwaka, 12% of the population is under 6 years of age.

== Transport ==
Gajuwaka is well connected by road. NH16 or AH45 passes through the Mandal. It also has major District roads and State Highways connecting it to nearby Mandals and Visakhapatnam. APSRTC runs bus services from the Gajuwaka bus station to major parts of the state and Visakhapatnam.

APSRTC routes

Route number	Start	End	Via
400	Gajuwaka	RTC Complex	New Gajuwaka, Sriharipuram, Malkapuram, Scindia, Naval Dockyard, Visakhapatnam Railway Station
99	Gajuwaka	R.K.Beach	New Gajuwaka, Sriharipuram, Malkapuram, Scindia, Naval Dockyard, Old Post Office, Jagadamba, Maharanipeta
38	Gajuwaka	RTC Complex	BHPV, Airport, NAD Kotharoad, Birla Junction, Gurudwar
38K	Kurmannapalem	RTC Complex	Old Gajuwaka, BHPV, Airport, NAD Kotharoad, Birla Junction, Gurudwar
38H	Gantyada HB Colony	RTC Complex	Pedagantyada, New Gajuwaka, Old Gajuwaka, BHPV, Airport, NAD Kotharoad, Birla Junction, Gurudwar
38T	Steel Plant	RTC Complex	Kurmannapalem, Old Gajuwaka, BHPV, Airport, NAD Kotharoad, Birla Junction, Gurudwar
38D	Nadupuru	RTC Complex	Pedagantyada, New Gajuwaka, Old Gajuwaka, BHPV, Airport, NAD Kotharoad, Birla Junction, Gurudwar
38J	Janata Colony	RTC Complex	Sriharipuram, New Gajuwaka, Old Gajuwaka, BHPV, Airport, NAD Kotharoad, Birla Junction, Gurudwar
600	Anakapalle	scindia	Lankelapalem, Kurmannapalem, Old Gajuwaka, New Gajuwaka, Malkapuram
38Y	Duvvada Railway Station	RTC Complex	Kurmannaplem, Old Gajuwaka, BHPV, Airport, NAD Kotharoad, Birla Junction, Gurudwar
55	Scindia	Simhachalam	Malkapuram, New Gajuwaka, Old Gajuwaka, BHPV, Airport, NAD Kotharoad, Gopalapatnam
55K	Scindia	Kottavalasa	Malkapuram, New Gajuwaka, Old Gajuwaka, BHPV, Airport, NAD Kotharoad, Gopalapatnam, Pendurthi
500	Anakapalle	RTC Complex	Lankelapalem, Kurmannaplem, Old Gajuwaka, BHPV, Airport, NAD Kotharoad, Birla Junction, Gurudwar
747	Vada Chipurupalle	RTC Complex	Parawada, Lankelapalem, Kurmannaplem, Old Gajuwaka, BHPV, Airport, NAD Kotharoad, Birla Junction, Gurudwar

Visakhapatnam Metro

(i) Kommadi to Steel Plant Jn. on NH-16 (34.23 km)	(ii) Steel plant Jn. to Anakapalli (18.2 km)
