= Transport in Visakhapatnam =

Transport system

Transport in Visakhapatnam is the network of roads, railways, rapid transit system in the largest city of Andhra Pradesh. The city of Visakhapatnam also serves as the central hub of transport and logistics on the East coast of India and hence it is called as City Of Destiny.

There are various modes of transportation available in Visakhapatnam. It includes auto rickshaws, bicycles to mass transit systems such as buses and trains. Visakhapatnam is also home for a seaport and an international airport.

== Roadways ==
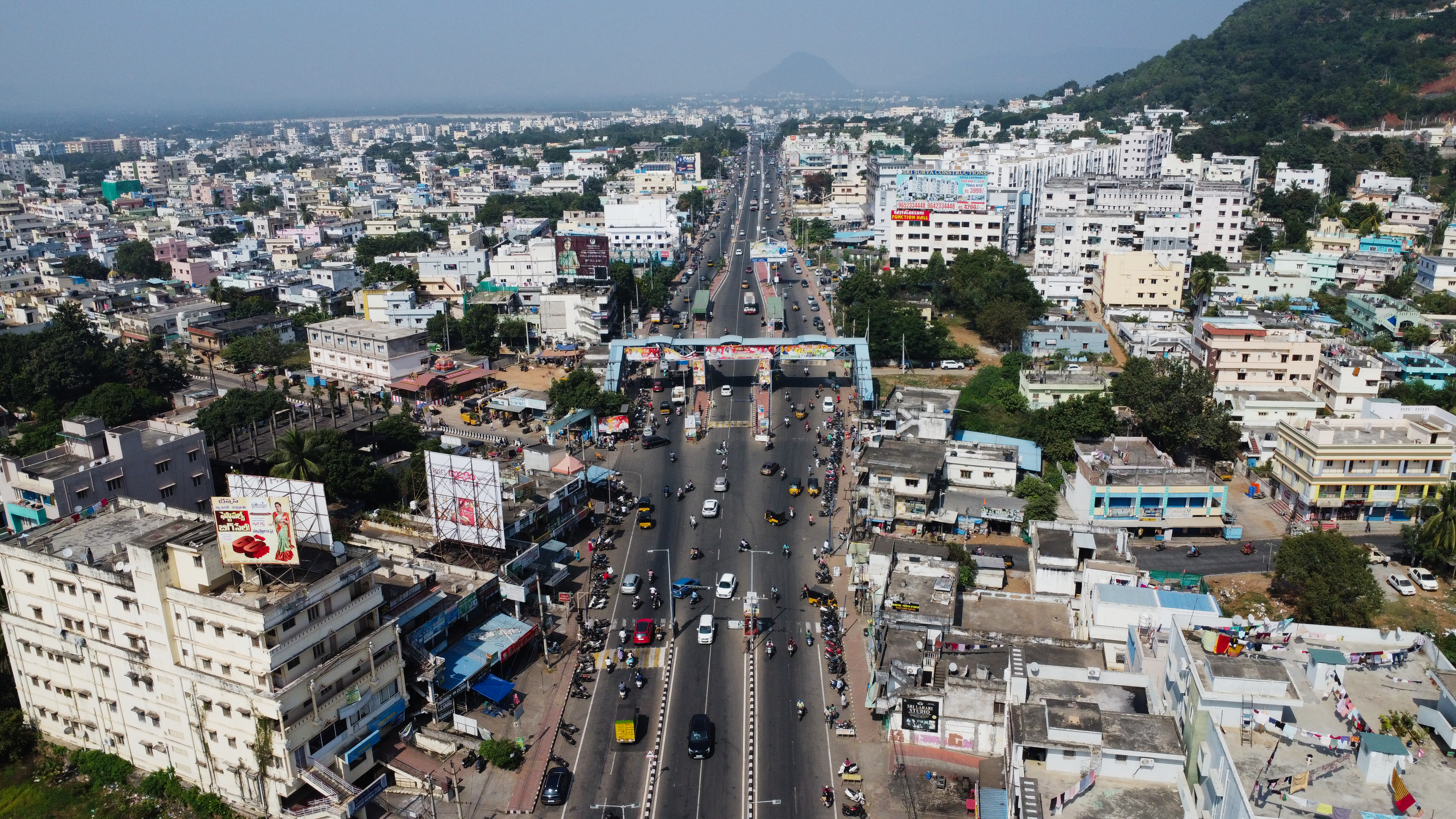
The Visakhapatnam Bus Rapid Transit System near Chinnamushidiwada.

Visakhapatnam is integrated into the National Highway Network of India through NH 16, NH 516C, NH 516D, NH 516E, while two State Highways SH38, SH39 originate/terminate in Vizag. Visakhapatnam has a vehicle population of nearly 12 lakhs and is the highest in the state.

The city has a total road length of 2,007.10 km (1,247.15 mi), covering 1,865 km (1,159 mi) of municipal roads, 70.10 km (43.56 mi) of Roads & Buildings department roads and 72 km (45 mi) of National highways. There are several arterial roads and ten junctions in the city, where Beach Road, Dabagardens Road, Dwarakanagar road, Sampath Vinayak Temple Road (also known as VIP road), Scindia Road, Chitralaya Road and waltair Main road are some of them. Jagadamba Centre, Maddilapalem Junction, Siripuram Junction, Madhurawada Junction, Gajuwaka Junction, Gopalapatnam Junction and NAD X Road, Kurnmannapalem Junction are major junctions in the city.

There are plans to upgrade National highway NH 16 that is presently passing through city and shift it to newly constructing Anakapalle - Anandapuram Highway, so that unnecessary traffic passing through city can be regulated.

== Public transport ==
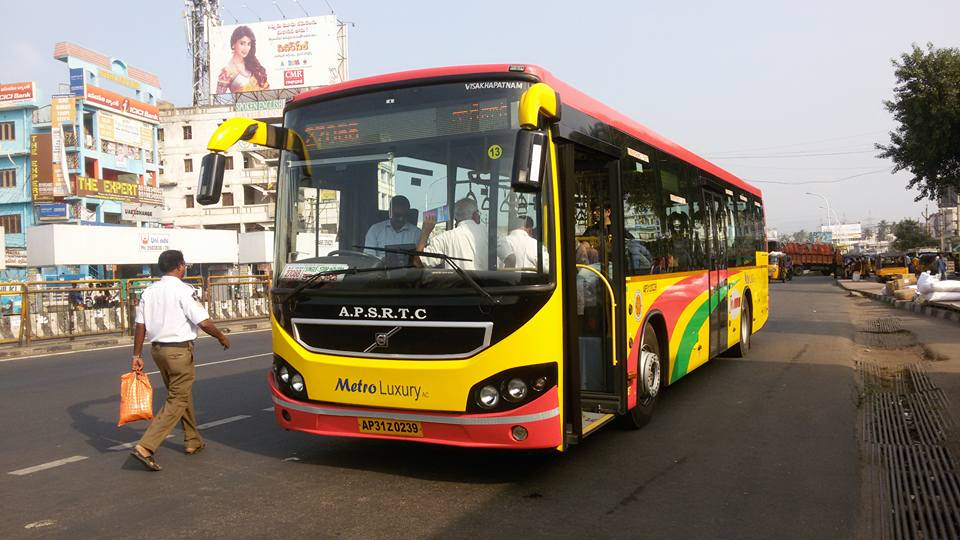
APSRTC Metro Luxury (A.C.) on Vizag roads

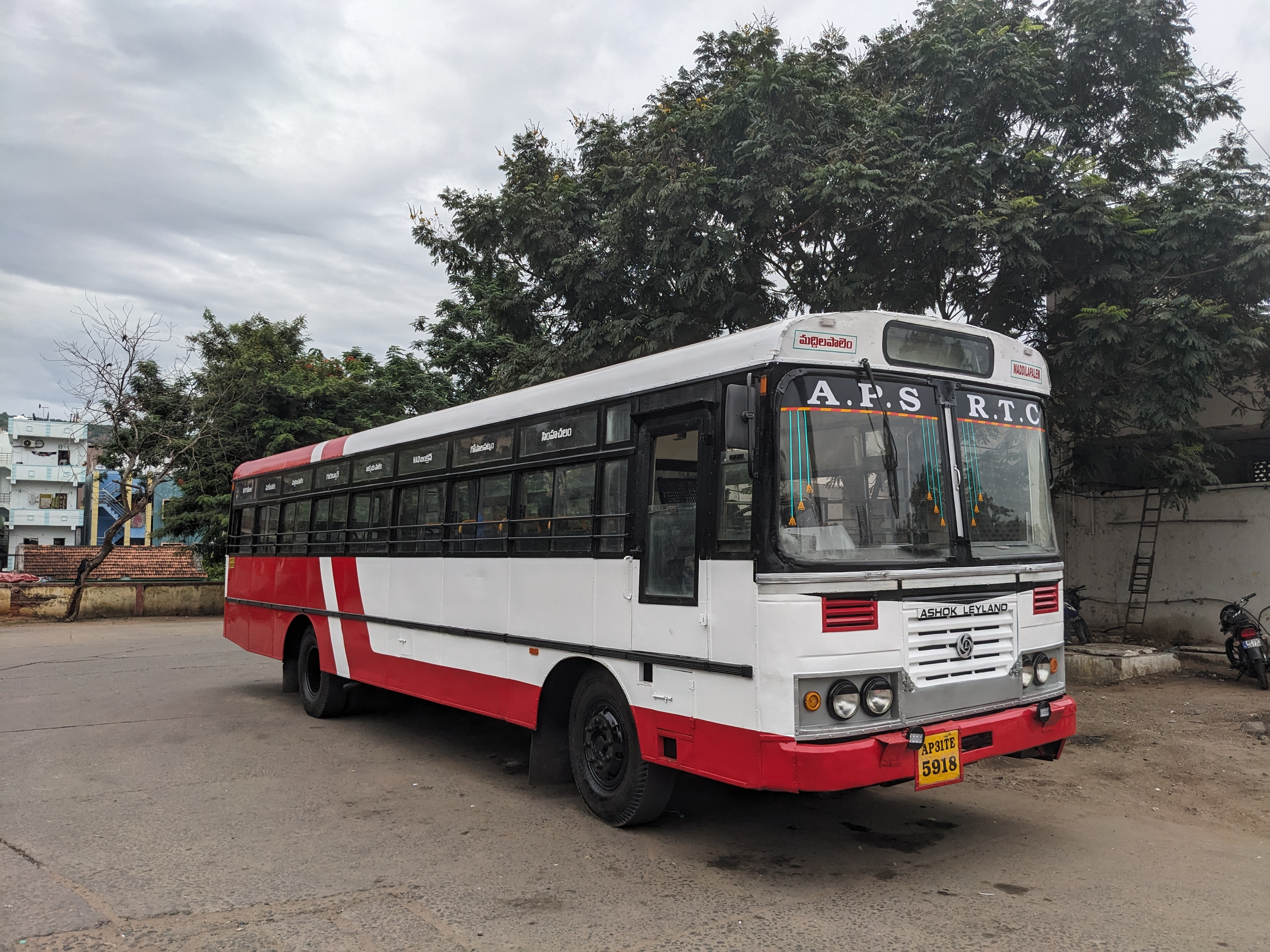
A City Ordinary bus

=== Bus ===
Bus Transit is the major mode of passenger transport in the city. Within the municipal limits of the city, APSRTC plies nearly 600 City bus services in the region which serve lakhs of commuters in city daily from Dwaraka Central Bus Station Complex, Maddilapalem bus station, MVP Colony bus station, Gajuwaka Bus station, Simhachalam bus station, Kurmannapalem bus station and Madhurawada bus station.

The City is among one of the best Bus Transit system in India, with many Bus lines. Some of the popular lines are Bus no. 55,111 etc.. These Bus lines connect the City's outskirts and different Commercial and Economic Centres like Pendurthi, Gajuwaka, Anakapalli, Madhurawada, Anandapuram, Bheemunipatnam, Kothavalasa and many more Villages and towns.

Also APSRTC plies various interstate and distant buses from Dwaraka Central Bus Station Complex or APSRTC Bus Complex, Kurmannapalem Bus station, Maddilapalem bus station, Simhachalam bus station and Madhurawada Bus Station to major parts of the State and neighboring states like Telangana, Karnataka, Tamil Nadu, Odisha and Chhattisgarh. There are kinds of buses that ply in city namely:

- Metro Express Low Floor (non air-conditioned)
- Metro Express
- Metro Luxury (air-conditioned)
- City Ordinary

Visakhapatnam Bus Rapid Transit System was completely operational.

=== Cabs ===
Vehicle for hire companies serving localities daily are Ola and Uber, While Rapido gives rides for one person only. Private tour operators serve for commuting in major lines. Also there are Mini Vans that commute people from short and long distances ranging from 10 km to 100 km.

=== Others ===
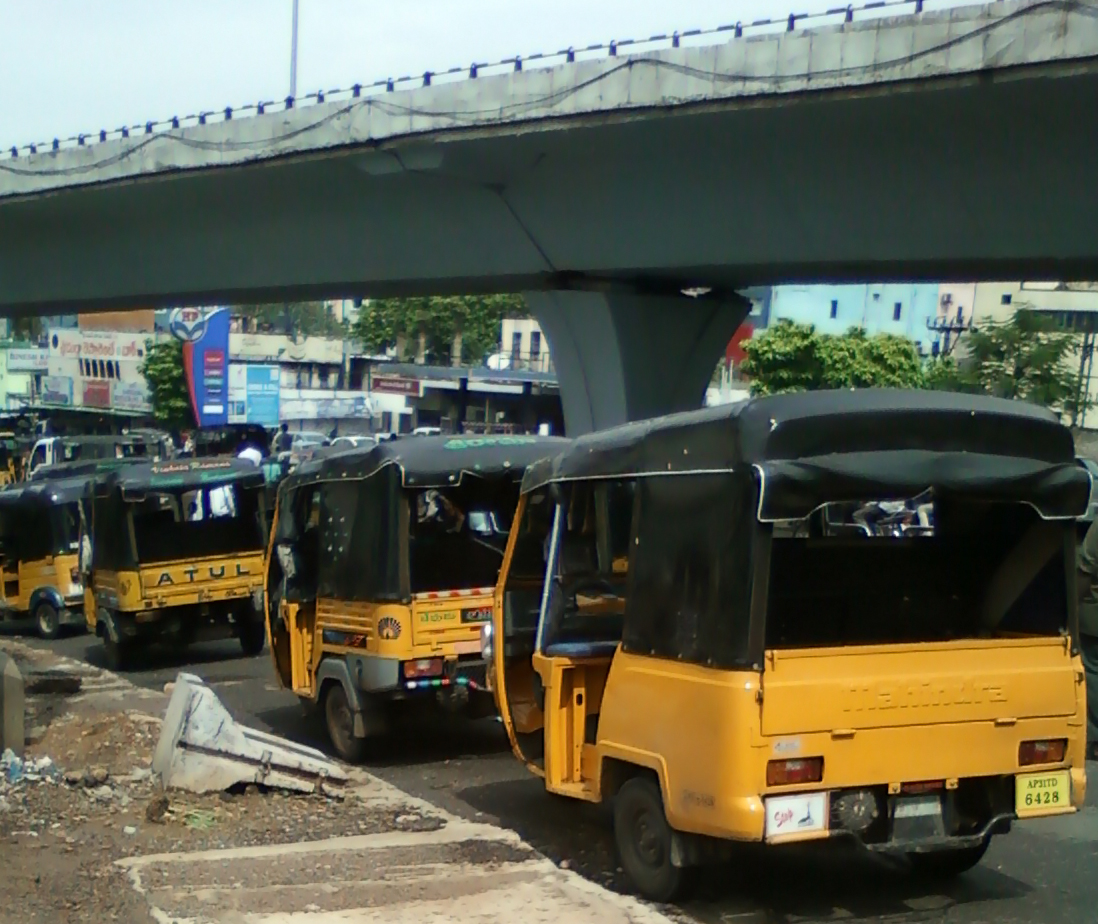
Auto rickshaws at Telugu Thalli flyover in Vizag

Cycle rickshaws are only confined to a very small area of the city and are almost disappeared, which were one of the major means of transport. Cycling paths are under construction in Vizag. By 2017, Vizag will be AP's first city to get such bike stations. All India Bicycling Federation is planning to build 20-25 bicycle stations in the city, each hosting 25 bicycles. This project costs around ₹200 crore (US$21 million). GVMC plans to introduce a community cycling initiative over 10.5 km^{2} of roads in downtown Visakhapatnam, under the Jawaharlal Nehru National Urban Renewal Mission. In the central parts of the city, cycling tracks will be earmarked on 100-feet roads to a width of about 8 feet.

== Railways ==
Train Transit is the major mode of transportation in the city, as the city is a hub for Major Industrial buildings, Employees and Goods are transported through trains. Visakhapatnam is the headquarters of South Coast Railway zone of Indian Railways. Visakhapatnam Junction railway station is an A1 station with the highest gross revenue in the Visakhapatnam railway division. There are plans to modernize this railway stations under station modernization launched by union government. Because present railway station is a terminal building and several constrains, Division has identified Marripalem as an option and is planning to make it an alternative for present station, that can bring trains ignoring city's main station. Other important railway stations in the city are:

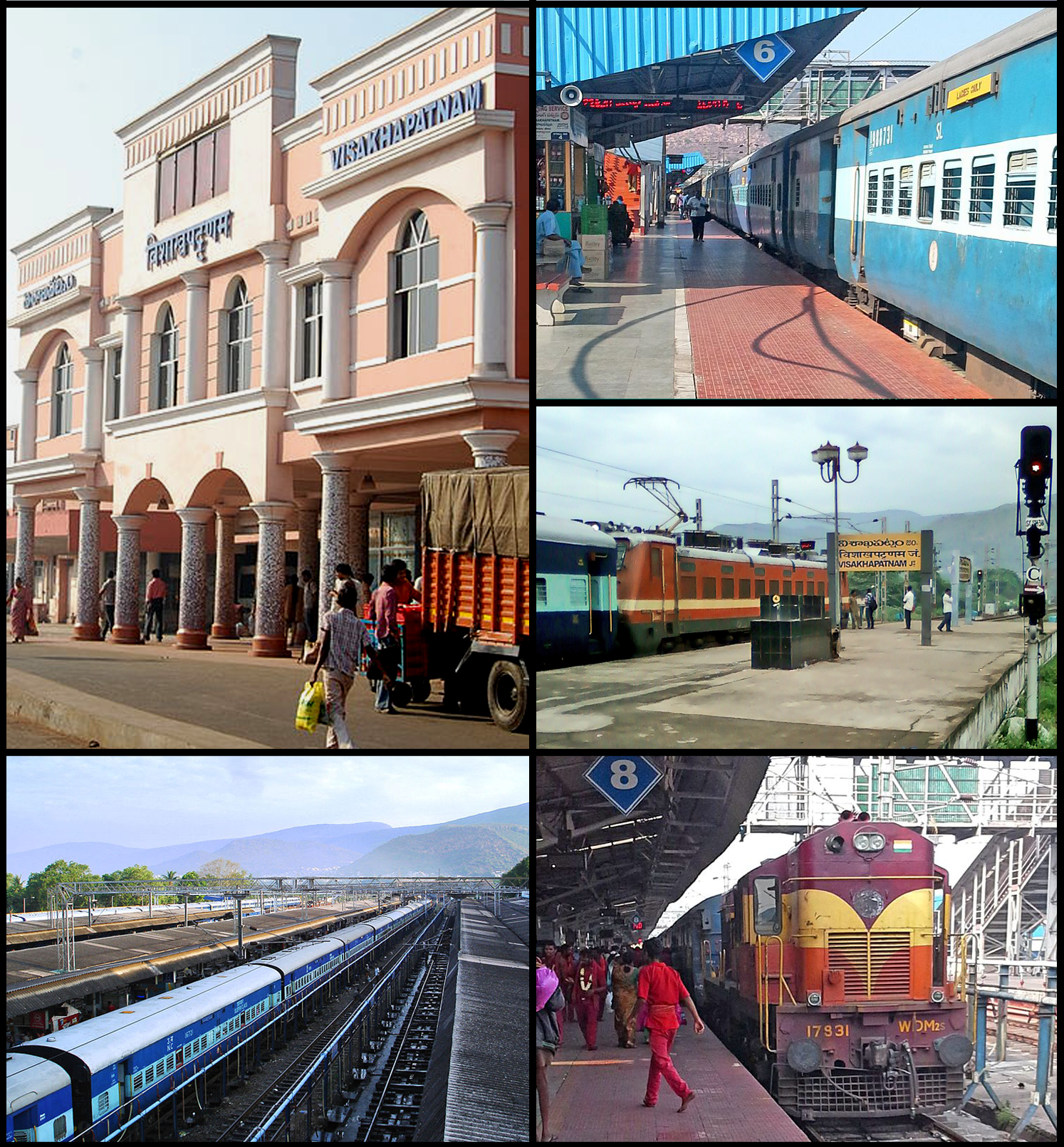
Visakhapatnam Railway Station

- Anakapalle railway station
- Duvvada railway station
- Marripalem Halt railway station
- Pendurti railway station
- Simhachalam railway station
- Simhachalam North railway station

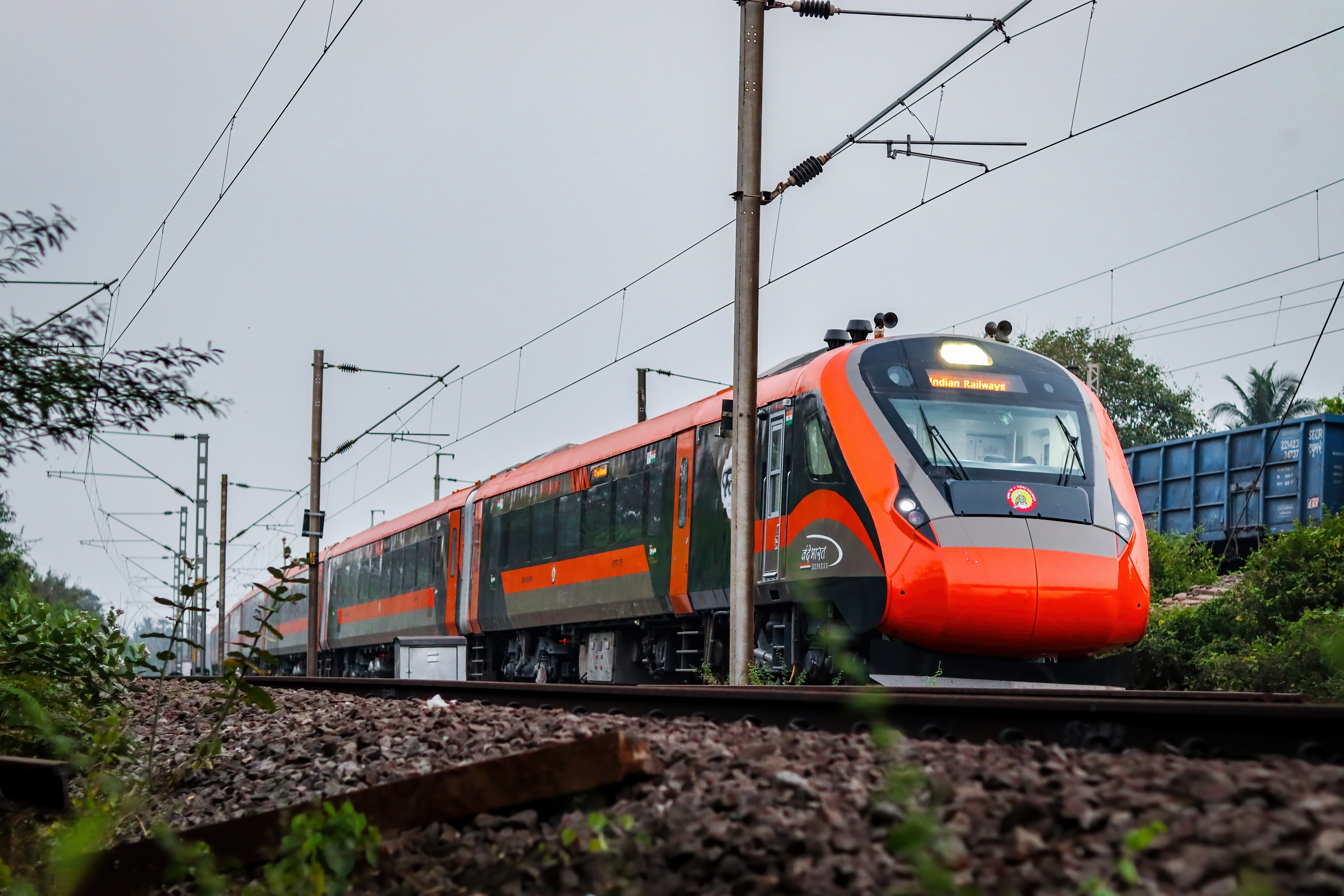
Vande Bharat at Visakhapatnam

=== Metro ===
Vizag Metro is approved mass transit project soon to be constructed. GVMC has identified four corridors for mass rapid transit (MRT) covering a total distance of 75.3 km at an estimated cost of ₹15,933 crore. The first phase, extending over 46.40 km, is expected to be completed by 2025. They are Steel Plant to Kommadi junction covering a distance of 34.23 km, Gurudwara to Old Post Office covering 5.26 km, Tatichetlapalem to China Waltair covering 6.91 km and Kommadi to Bhogapuram Airport, covering a distance of 28.91 km. It is estimated to cost ₹15,933 crore (US$1.7 billion) for the construction of these corridors.

The Metro will have Asia's longest double decker flyover. There will be a flyover for which above there will be another layer for the metro.

The Metro is aimed to be constructed by 2028. It is a key project for APMRC which is the main corporation which had proposed and planned the project. After it is completed this project will transform Visakhapatnam's Transport sector.

=== Tram ===
Govt of Andhra Pradesh has planned to build trackless tram services in Visakhapatnam for a length of 60.2 km. This tram would be included in four corridors namely NAD X Roads - Pendurthi, Steel Plant - Anakapalle, Old post office - Rushikonda and Rushikonda - Bheemunipatnam.

== Airways ==
A view of Visakhapatnam Airport

=== Visakhapatnam International Airport ===
Visakhapatnam International Airport, situated to the North-East of Andhra Pradesh, is the main gateway for the city's domestic and international civilian air traffic. In 2017–18, the airport handled more than 2.8 million passengers. Hyderabad, Bangalore, Chennai, Delhi, Kolkata, Mumbai, Vijayawada, Tirupati, Dubai, Singapore and Kuala Lumpur are the major Airway destinations from city airport. Annually, 7.47 lakh passengers travelled on the Visakhapatnam-Hyderabad route, followed by 4.90 lakh passengers on the Visakhapatnam-Bengaluru.

=== Alluri Sitarama Raju International Airport ===
The construction of Greenfield Airport near Bhogapuram of 2,703 acres is on its way and it will probably meet the needs of Visakhapatnam city now. State government has handed over the construction process to GMR Airports Limited .

This airport is expected to act as a trade hub in the heart of Visakhapatnam, Vizianagaram and Srikakulam. It will be one of the largest Airport in Andhra Pradesh and will likely stand as an important trade hub in India in its coming future.

== Awards and recognition ==
- Visakhapatnam Airport was awarded Best Airport in Tier-2 Airport Category(Rest of India) in National Tourism Awards 2011–2012.

== Seaways ==
=== Visakhapatnam Port ===
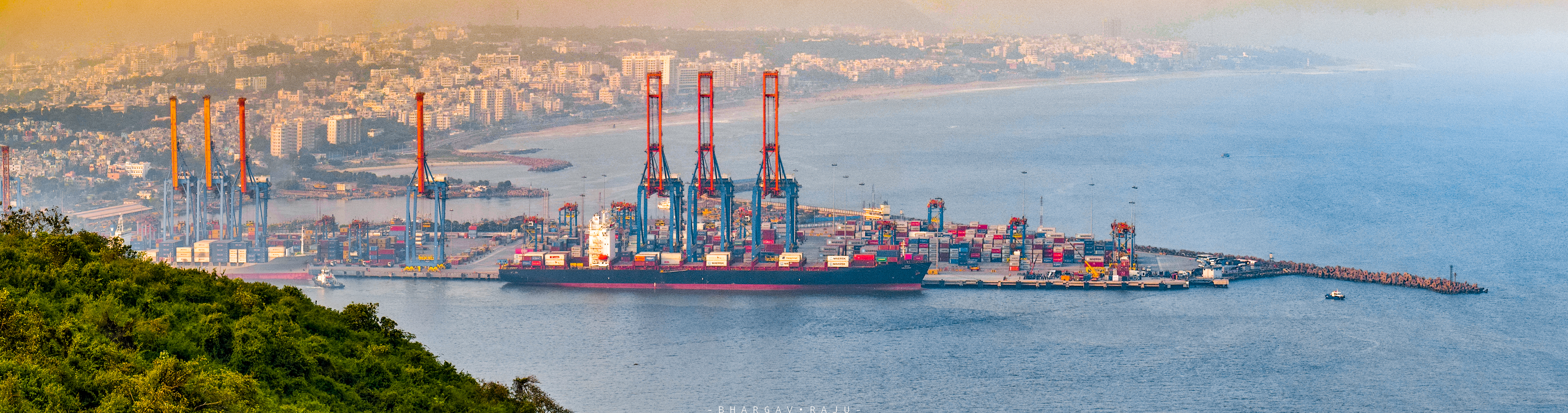
Visakhapatnam Sea Port

Visakhapatnam Port is one of 13 major ports in India and the only major port of Andhra Pradesh. It is India's second largest port by volume of cargo handled in the nation. It is located on the east coast of India and is located midway between the Chennai and Kolkata Ports. Visakhapatnam Port has three harbors - the outer harbor, inner harbor and the fishing harbor. The outer harbor has 6 berths capable of handling vessels with a draft up to 17 meters while the smaller inner harbor has 18 berths that are Panamax compatible. Vizag Seaport owns two berths in the inner harbor; berth EQ-8 is fully mechanized and berth EQ-9 berth is not. Iron ore, manganese ore, steel products, general cargo, coal and crude oil are the main commodities handled at this port.

Visakhapatnam Port is undergoing a modernization and expansion program aimed at increasing its capacity to 130 million tonnes by 2016–17, entailing an investment of ₹13,000 crores. This will also solve the problem of air pollution caused by the open handling of coal that had earlier led to citywide protests.

The Visakhapatnam Port Trust plans to develop a satellite port at Bheemunipatnam to decongest traffic at Visakhapatnam. The project is expected to cost ₹2,000 crore (US$210 million) and is to be undertaken through a Public- Private Partnership (PPP)venture. Also govt plans to have a new port at Nakkapalli.

=== Gangavaram Port ===
Another major port in Visakhapatnam is Gangavaram port which is considered as deep port. It can handle vessels up to 2,00,000 DWT. The Rashtriya Ispat Nigam Limited (RINL) which runs the Vizag Steel Plant had shifted base to this port, taking with it a large chunk of the coal and iron ore traffic.

=== Passenger ===
Cruise Shipping is operational between Visakhapatnam and Andaman and Nicobar Islands. There are plans to launch cruises to Kakinada.
