= Prahaladapuram =

- Neighbourhood
- Location in Visakhapatnam
- Coordinates: 17.767713°N 83.225200°E
- Country: India
- State: Andhra Pradesh
- District: Visakhapatnam

Government
  - Body: Greater Visakhapatnam Municipal Corporation

Languages
  - Official: Telugu
- Time zone: UTC+5:30 (IST)
- PIN: 530029
- Vehicle registration: AP 32 and AP 33

Prahaladapuram is a suburban area in Visakhapatnam city under Greater Visakhapatnam Municipal Corporation of Pendurthi in Andhra Pradesh, India. It is located 14 km Nomet from Visakhapatnam city center.

Vepagunta is the head post office and postal pin code is 530047.

== How to reach ==
By road: It is well connected with number of city buses plying from RK Beach, Gajuwaka, NAD X Road, Dwaraka bus station in Visakhapatnam city. Also number of buses available from Vijayanagaram

Andhra Pradesh State Road Transport Corporation routes:

Route number	Start	End	Via
28	RK Beach	Simhachalam	Jagadamba Centre, RTC Complex, Kancharapalem, NAD Kotharoad, Gopalapatnam
28S	RK Beach	Simhapuri Colony	Jagadamba Centre, RTC Complex, Kancharapalem, NAD Kotharoad, Gopalapatnam
28H	RK Beach	Simhachalam Hill	Jagadamba Centre, RTC Complex, Railway Station, Kancharapalem, NAD Kotharoad, Gopalapatnam
28Z/H	Zilla Parishad	Simhachalam Hill	Jagadamba Centre, RTC Complex, Gurudwara, Birla Junction, NAD Kotharoad, Gopalapatnam
6A/6A/H	RTC Complex	Simhachalam/Simhachalam Hill	Railway Station, Kancharapalem, NAD Kotharoad, Gopalapatnam
6/6H	Old Head Post Office	Simhachalam/Simhachalam Hill	Town Kotharoad, Convent Junction, Kancharapalem, NAD Kotharoad, Gopalapatnam
55	Scindia	Simhachalam	Malkapuram, Sriharipuram, New Gajuwaka, Old Gajuwaka, BHPV, NAD Kotharoad, Gopalapatnam
540	MVP Colony	Simhachalam	Venkojipalem, Maddilapalem, Gurudwara, NAD Kotharoad, Gopalapatnam

By rail: Pendurthi, Simhachalam North railway stations are very closely located. Marripalem railway station and Visakhapatnam railway stations are within 15 km range.

== Educational institutions ==
Many schools and colleges are located in and around Prahaladapuram. T S R N Jr. College, Pendurthi, St. Xavier's Degree college, ZPHS, Vepgunta are prominent.
