= Chinnamushidiwada =

Chinnamushidiwada చినముషిడివాడ
- Neighbourhood
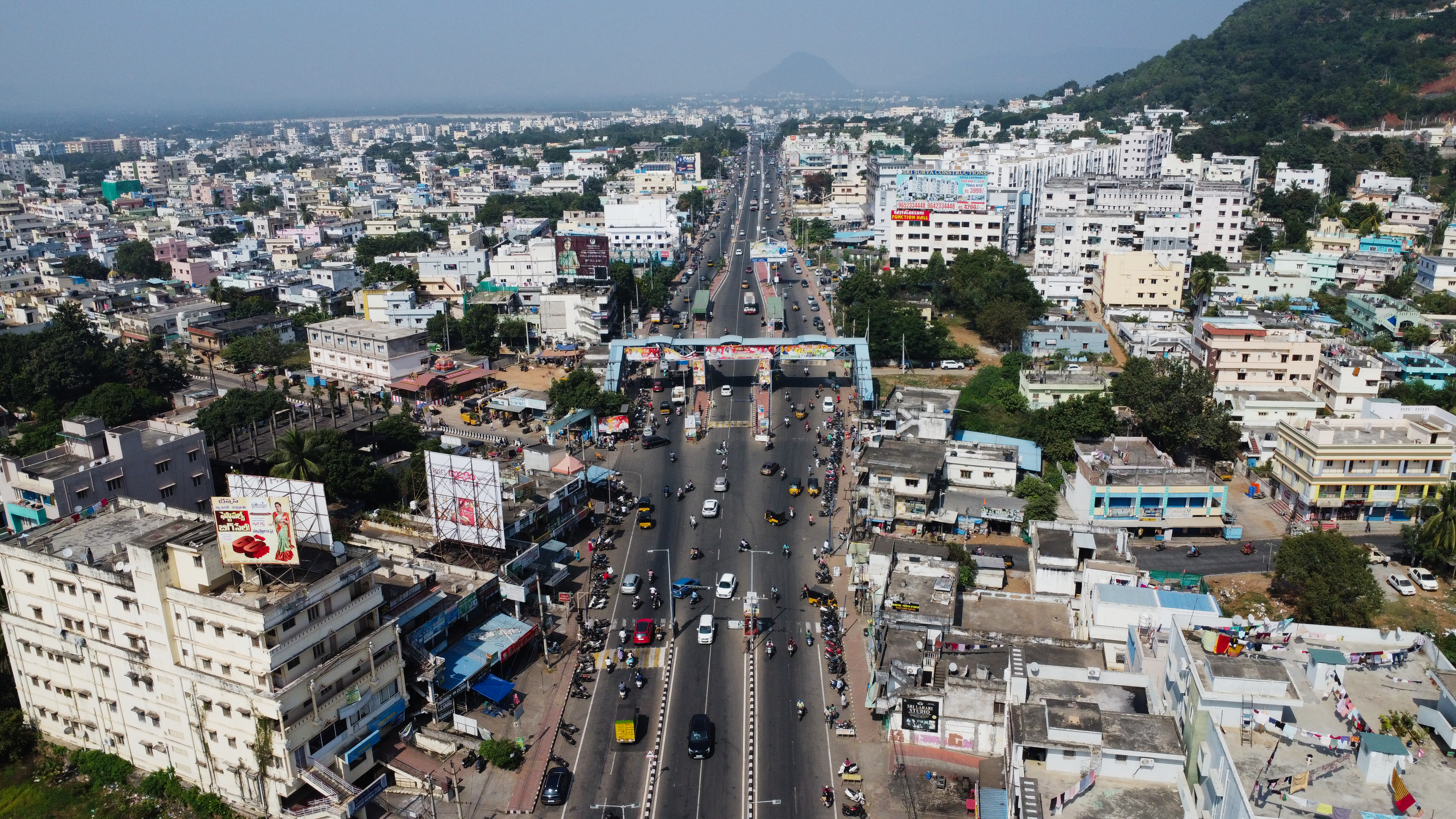
- Chinnamushidiwada junction aerial view

- Location in Visakhapatnam
- Coordinates: 17.802228°N 83.207457°E
- Country: India
- State: Andhra Pradesh
- District: Visakhapatnam

Government
  - Body: Greater Visakhapatnam Municipal Corporation

Languages
  - Official: Telugu
- Time zone: UTC+5:30 (IST)
- PIN: 531173
- Vehicle registration: AP-31

Chinnamushidiwada is a neighborhood situated on the western part of Visakhapatnam City, India. The area, which falls under the local administrative limits of Greater Visakhapatnam Municipal Corporation, is about 15 km from Dwaraka Bus Station . Chinnamushidiwada is located near Pendurthi and is served by the Visakhapatnam Bus Rapid Transit System. It is a rapidly developing residential and commercial area in Visakhapatnam.

== Transport and amenities ==
Chinamushidiwada has a city bus station on BRTS road with a foot over bridge.
The nearby railway station is Pendurthi railway station which is approximately 3 km away.
The area also has few reputed educational institutions, namely KKR Gowtam, Indian springs, Ravindra Bharathi, DAV public school, NRI college and Byju's tuition center etc.
APSRTC routes

Route number	Start	End	Via
5	Pendurthi	Old Head Post Office	Pendurthi, Vepagunta, Gopalapatnam, NAD, Kancharapalem, Convent jn, Town Kotharoad
300C	Chodavaram	Rtc complex	Rly station, Kancharapalem,104, NAD, Pendurthi, Sabbavaram, Chodavaram
300M	Madugula	Rtc complex	Rly station, Kancharapalem,104, NAD, Pendurthi, Sabbavaram, Chodavaram, Madugula
541P	Maddilapalem	Padmanabham	Padmanabham, Pendurthi, Gopalapatnam, NAD, Muralinagar, Tatichetlapalem, Akkayyapalem, Gurudwara, Satyam jn, Maddilapalem
55Y	Pendurthi	Kurmannapalem	Pendurthi, Gopalapatnam, NAD, Airport, Sheelanagar, BHPV, Gajuwaka, Kurmannapalem
28K	Kothavalasa	RK Beach	Vepagunta, Gopalapatnam, NAD Kotharoad, Kancharapalem, RTC Complex, Jagadamba Centre
68K	Kothavalasa	RK Beach	Pendurthi, Vepagunta, Simhachalam, Adavivaram, Arilova, Hanumanthuwaka, Maddilapalem, RTC Complex, Jagadamba Centre
541	Kothavalasa	Maddilapalem	Pendurthi, Vepagunta, Gopalapatnam, NAD Kotharoad, Birla Junction, Gurudwar, Satyam Junction
12D	Devarapalle	RTC Complex	Kothavalasa, Pendurthi, Vepagunta, Gopalapatnam, NAD Kotharoad, Birla Junction, Gurudwar
201	Srungavarapukota	RTC Complex	Kothavalasa, Pendurthi, Vepagunta, Gopalapatnam, NAD Kotharoad, Birla Junction, Gurudwar
55	Gajuwaka	Bheemili	Gajuwaka, NAD, Pendurthi, Shontyam, Gudilova, Anandapuram, Tagarapuvalasa, Bheemili
55K	Kothavalasa	Scindia	Pendurthi, Vepagunta, Gopalapatnam, NAD Kotharoad, Airport, BHPV, Old Gajuwaka, New Gajuwaka, Malkapuram

In addition to busses there are many auto rickshaws which run services to NAD and Railway station.
