= Simhachalam bus station =

Bus station in Simhachalam, India

Simhachalam bus station సింహాచలం బస్ స్టేషన్
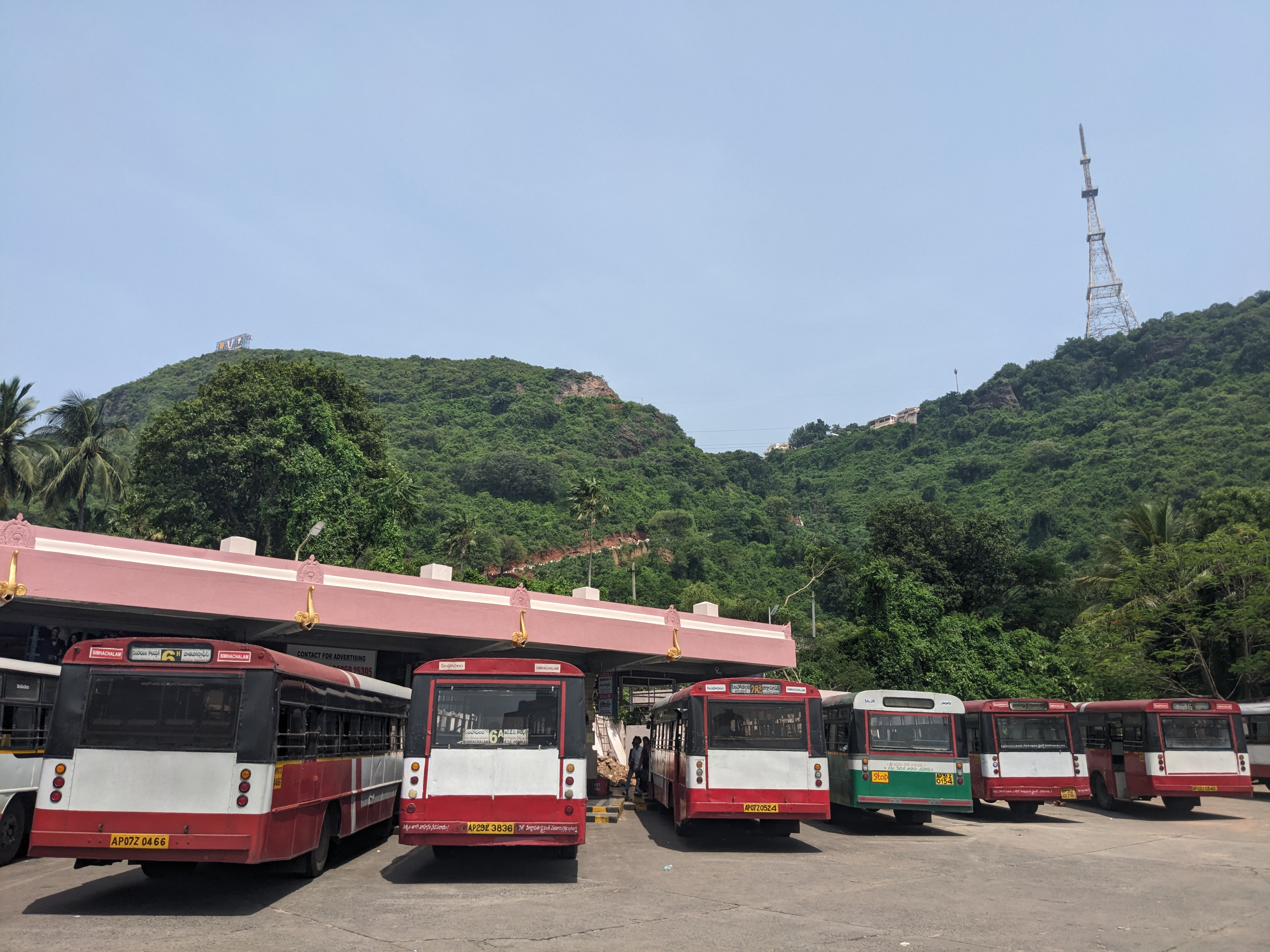
- Simhachalam bus station and hill

General information
- Location: Venkateswaraswamy Temple Rd, Near Bus Stop, Sri Sai Nagar, Simhachalam, Visakhapatnam, Andhra Pradesh 530028; India
- Owner: APSRTC
- Operator: APSRTC
- Bus routes: 28,28H,68K,28z/h,549,540,6A/H,6A,6H,60H,55H
- Connections: Gajuwaka, Maddilapalem, RK Beach, Old Head Post office, MVP Colony, Kothavalasa, Pendurthi, Vizianagaram

Construction
- Parking: yes

Simhachalam bus station is a bus station located in temple town Simhachalam of the Indian state of Andhra Pradesh. It is owned by Andhra Pradesh State Road Transport Corporation. This is one of the major bus stations in the district, with services to Visakhapatnam, all towns and villages in the district. A new bus station is also being constructed near Adavivaram junction for Simhachalam.
