= Visakhapatnam Bus Rapid Transit System =

Public transport system in India

Visakhapatnam BRTS
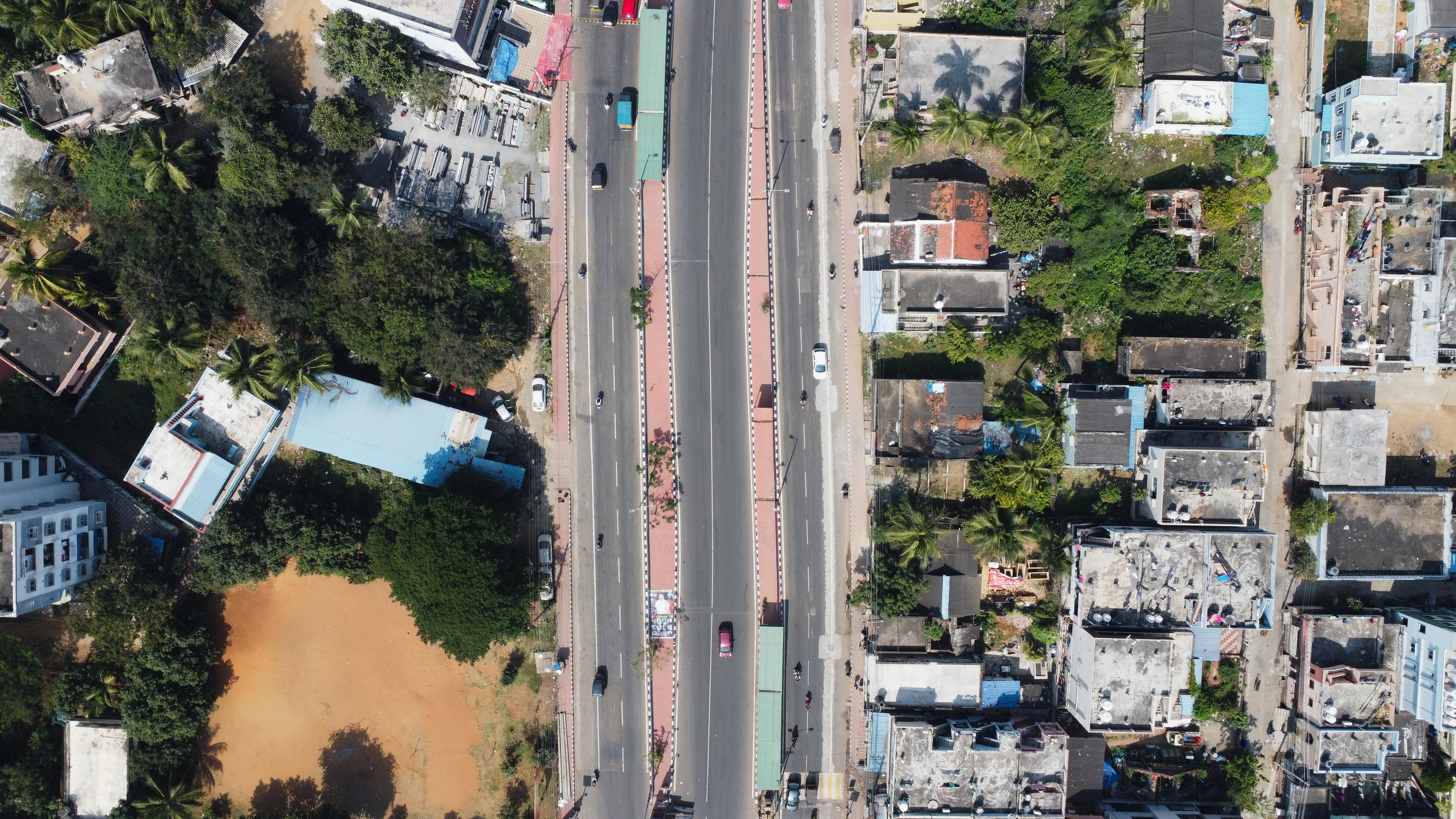
- Aerial view of two bus stops and the bus lane in Purushothapuram, Vizag.

Overview
- Locale: Andhra Pradesh, India
- Transit type: Bus rapid transit

Visakhapatnam BRTS :-The implementation of the bus rapid transit system has been taken up as a high-capacity public transport system in Visakhapatnam keeping in view the projected multi-fold increase in traffic and constraints of road capacity. A Bus Rapid Transit System (BRTS) was approved for the city under the Jawaharlal Nehru National Urban Renewal Mission. This project was started in 2008 and most of the route has been constructed except for a 2km stretch near Simhachalam. The delay is due to issues in land acquisition from railways, defence and private parties.

== Corridors ==
The following two corridors were identified for BRTS by the APSRTC and Greater Visakhapatnam Municipal Corporation.

The two corridors connect Pendurthi to Dwaraka Nagar on two different routes. The Pendurthi Transit Corridor of 22.6 km at an estimated cost of ₹190.97 crore starts at Pendurthi and ends at the Railway Station via Gopalapatnam, NAD X Road, Kancharapalem. The Simhachalam Transit Corridor of 20.5 km at an estimated ₹261.96 crore starts at Vepagunta and goes via Simhachalam, Adavivaram, Hanumanthavaka to Maddilapalem.

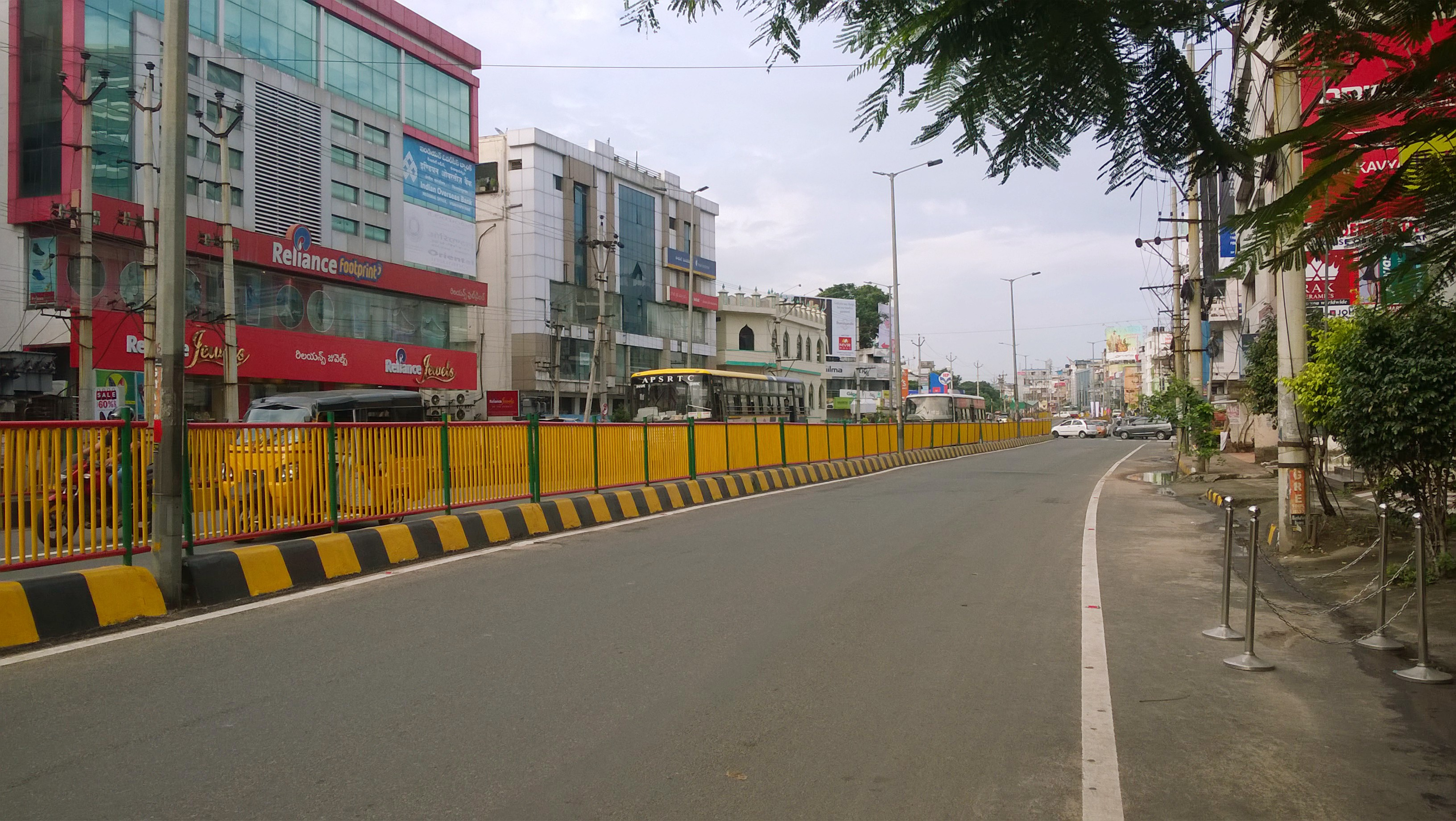
BRTS at Rama Talkies road

Bus Rapid Transport System projects of about 42 km in Vizag city at a total cost of about ₹452 crore. The BRTS would be implemented with a joint finance from the Andhra Pradesh government (20 %) and Government of India (50 %) under JNNURM, and GVMC (30 %).
