= Adavivaram =

Neighbourhood in Andhra Pradesh, India

- Neighbourhood
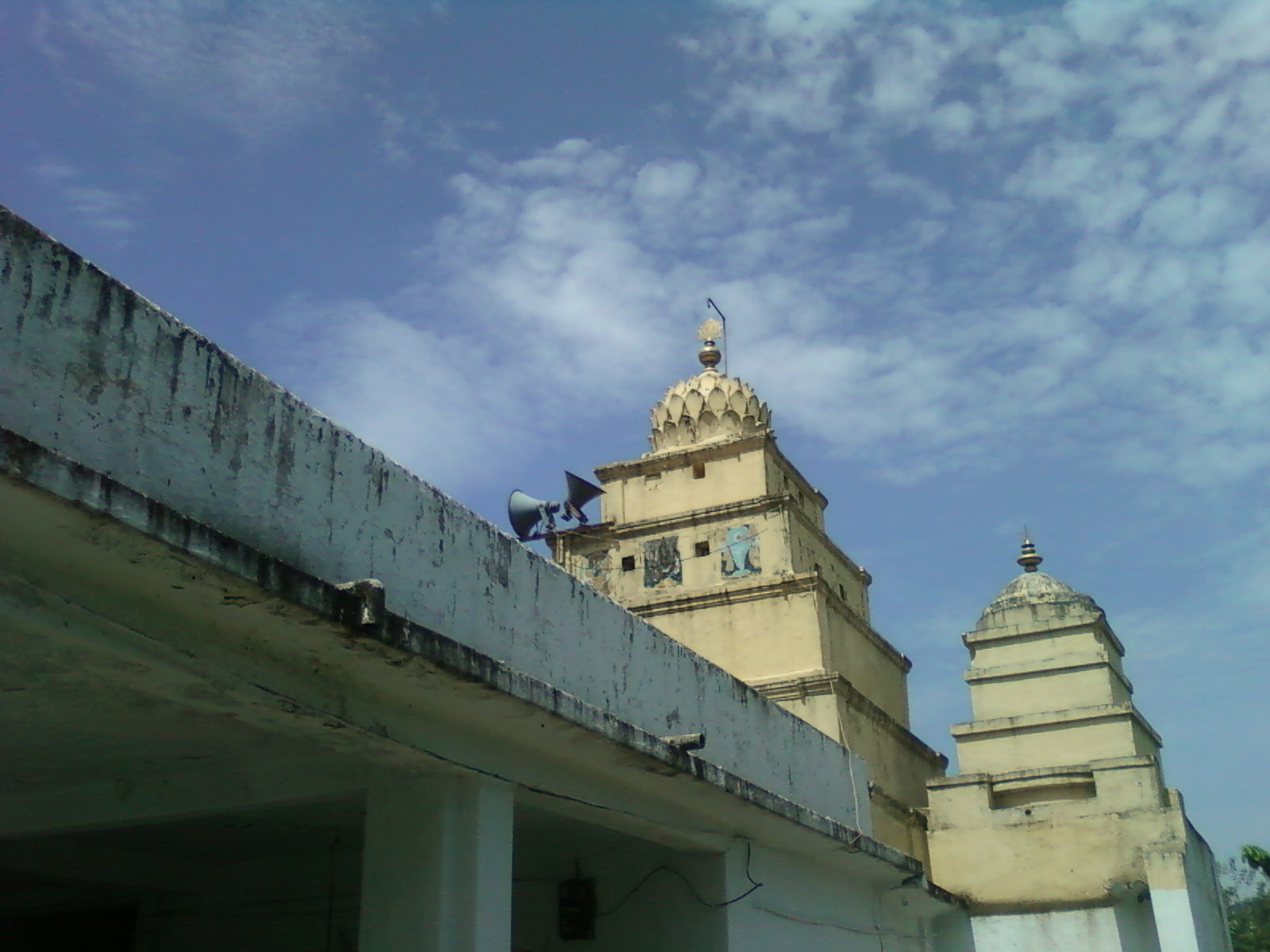
- Siva temple at adavivaram

- Location in Visakhapatnam
- Coordinates: 17.775649°N 83.245335°E
- Country: India
- State: Andhra Pradesh
- District: Visakhapatnam

Government
  - Body: Greater Visakhapatnam Municipal Corporation

Languages
  - Official: Telugu
- Time zone: UTC+5:30 (IST)
- PIN: 530028
- Vehicle registration: AP-31

Adavivaram is a neighborhood situated on the western part of Visakhapatnam City, India. The area, which falls under the local administrative limits of Greater Visakhapatnam Municipal Corporation, is about 15 km from the Dwaraka Nagar which is city centre. Adavivaram is located at the foothill of Simhachalam temple and is served by the Visakhapatnam Bus Rapid Transit System.

== Transport ==
APSRTC routes

| Route number | Start | End | Via |
|---|---|---|---|
| 68K/68 | Kothavalasa/Pendurthi | RK Beach | Pendurthi, Vepagunta, Simhachalam, Adavivaram, Arilova, Hanumanthuwaka, Maddilapalem, RTC Complex, Jagadamba Centre |
| 60 | Simhachalam | Old Head Post Office | Adavivaram, Arilova, Hanumanthuwaka, Maddilapalem, RTC Complex, Jagadamba Centre, Town Kotharoad |
| 368 | Chodavaram | RK Beach | Sabbavaram, Pendurthi, Vepagunta, Simhachalam, Adavivaram, Arilova, Hanumanthuwaka, Maddilapalem, RTC Complex, Jagadamba Centre |
| 700 | Simhachalam | Vizianagaram | Adavivaram, SR Puram, Shontyam, Gidijala, Boni, Padbanabham |
