= Maddilapalem bus station =

Bus station in Visakhapatnam, India

Maddilapalem Bus Station Complex
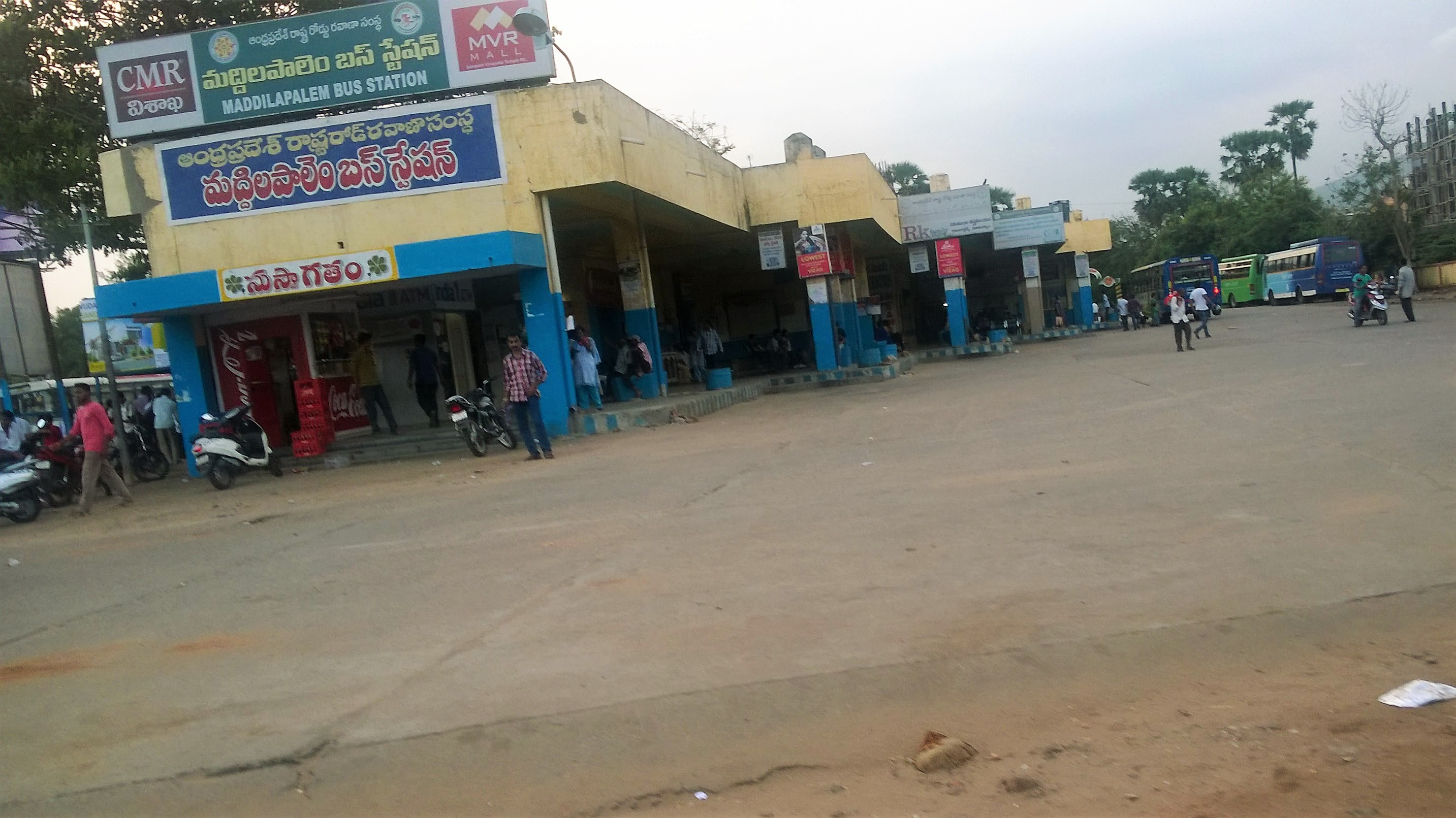
- A view of Maddilapalem bus station from NH-16

General information
- Location: Maddilapalem, Visakhapatnam, Visakhapatnam District, Andhra Pradesh; India
- Coordinates: 17°44′10″N 83°19′15″E
- Owner: APSRTC
- Platforms: 4

Construction
- Parking: Yes
Location
- Location within Visakhapatnam

Maddilapalem Bus Station is a bus station located at the Central part of Visakhapatnam city. The bus station is owned by Andhra Pradesh State Road Transport Corporation (APSRTC). This is one of the minor bus stations in Andhra Pradesh. Many buses from other states like Odissa, Chhattisgarh and Telangana arrive at the station. Buses provide their services to all the towns nearby and also within the city as well. It is mainly used as city bus terminus.

== City buses ==
Numerous city buses operate from here to the Bus Station Complex and Railway station and further to every part of the city.

== See also ==
- Dwaraka Bus station Complex
