= Waltair Uplands =

- Neighbourhood
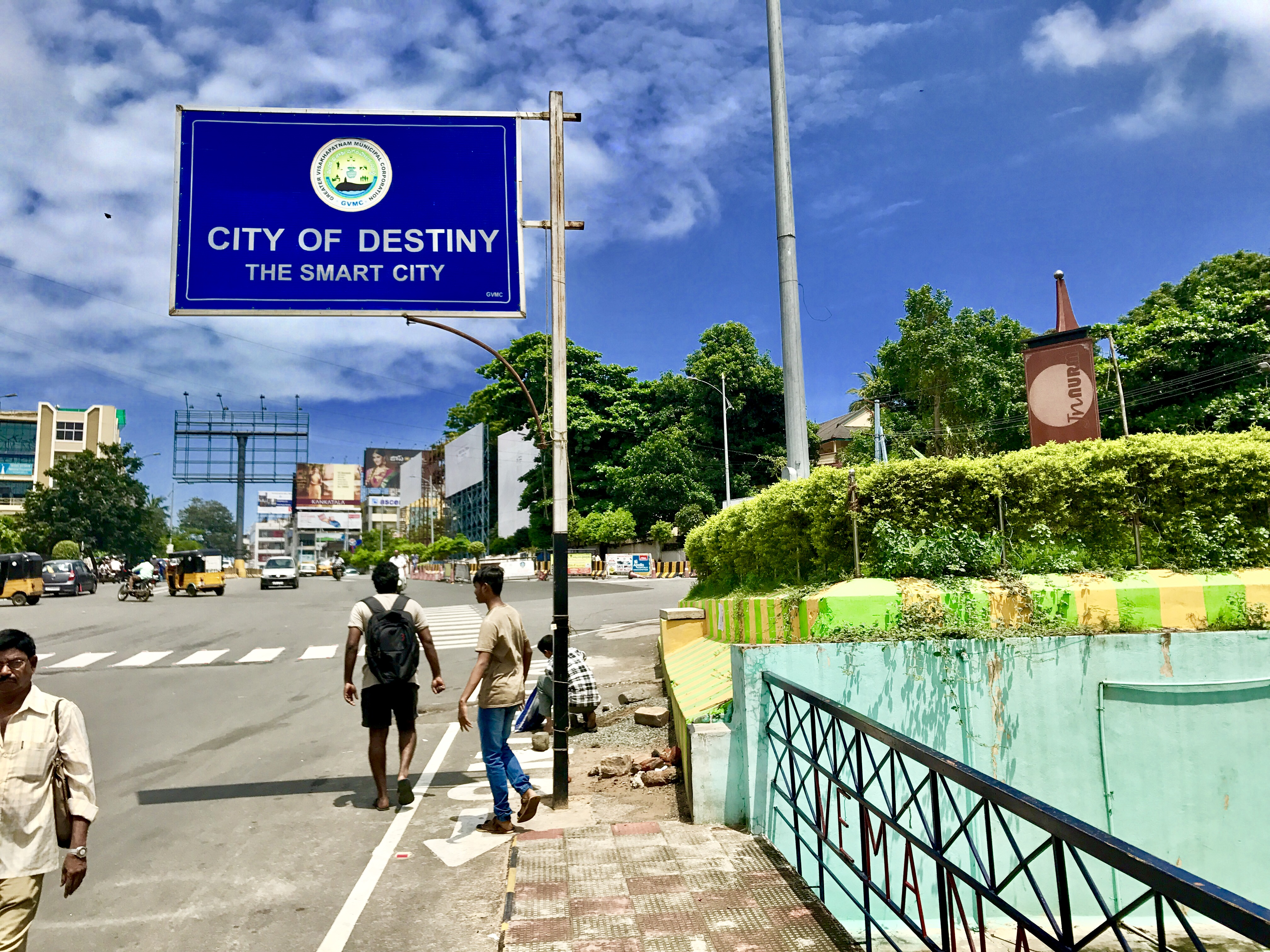
- A road near Waltair Uplands

- Location in Visakhapatnam
- Coordinates: 17.720972°N 83.312907°E
- Country: India
- State: Andhra Pradesh
- District: Visakhapatnam

Government
  - Body: Greater Visakhapatnam Municipal Corporation

Languages
  - Official: Telugu
- Time zone: UTC+5:30 (IST)
- PIN: 530003
- Vehicle registration: AP-31

Waltair Uplands is a neighbourhood situated in the central part of Visakhapatnam City. The area, which falls under the local administrative limits of Greater Visakhapatnam Municipal Corporation, is one of the most expensive residential and commercial areas in the city. Waltair Uplands is located between Ramnagar and Siripuram and is known for the city's famous coffee shops like Third wave of coffee, Barista Lavazza, Yallop Gourmet Lavazza and Café Coffee Day. Waltair Uplands has become an area in which young people congregate. It is also known for its many shopping outlets.
