= Siripuram, Visakhapatnam =

Siripuram
- Neighbourhood
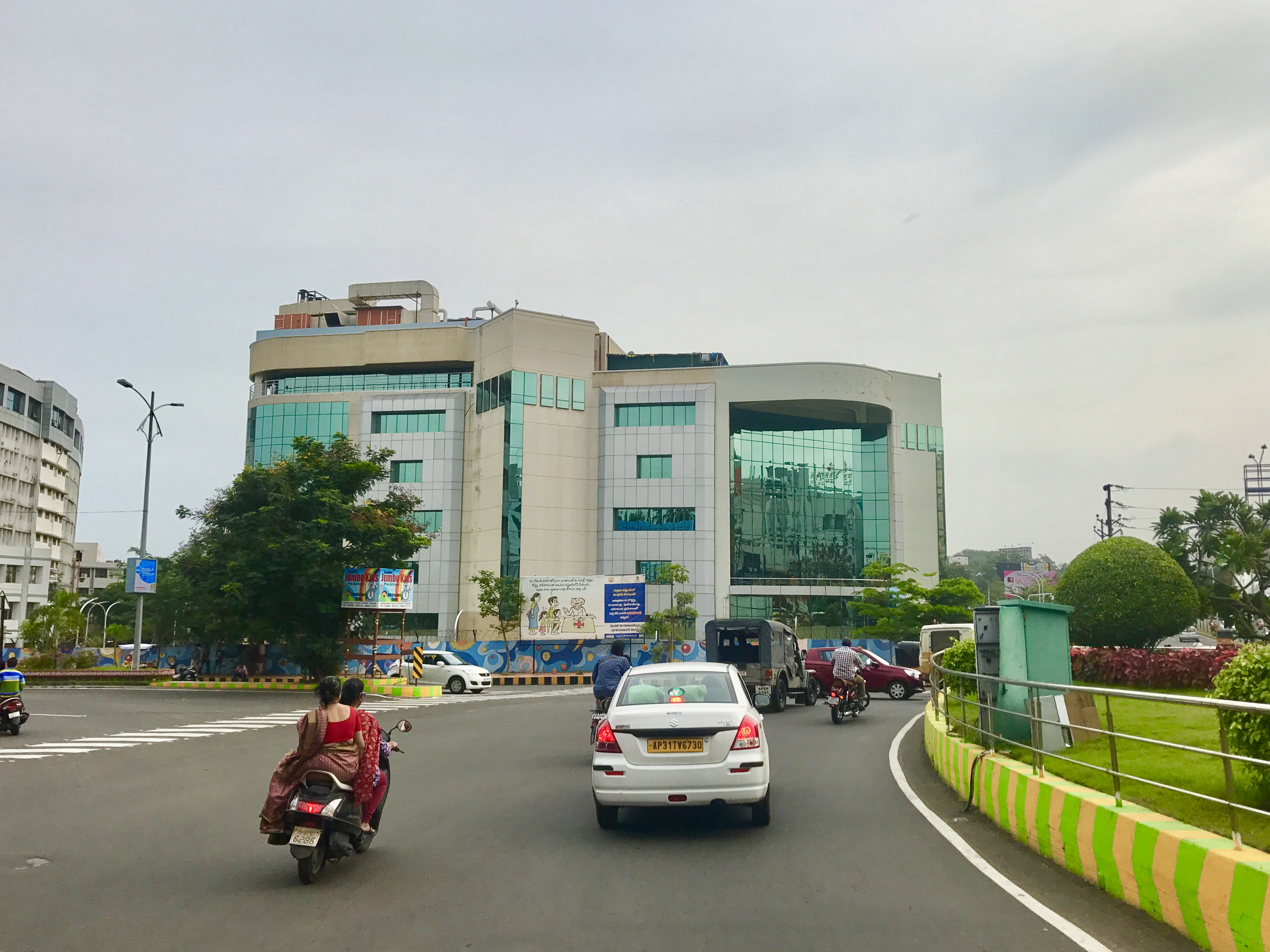
- WNS Global Services at Siripuram Road

- Location in Visakhapatnam
- Coordinates: 17.719757°N 83.316253°E
- Country: India
- State: Andhra Pradesh
- District: Visakhapatnam

Government
  - Body: Greater Visakhapatnam Municipal Corporation

Languages
  - Official: Telugu
- Time zone: UTC+5:30 (IST)
- PIN: 530003

Siripuram is an urban commercial center in Visakhapatnam, Andhra Pradesh, India. Visakhapatnam Metropolitan Region Development Authority administrative office is located here. There are many buildings landmark to this area.

== Commerce ==
There are many offices and outlets situated here. They are

- VMRDA Administrative Building
- VMRDA Multilevel Car Parking Complex
- WNS Global Services Corporate Office
- VMRDA Children Arena
- Gurajada Kalakshetram
- Dutt Island Building
- Akashavani Radio Station
- Government Circuit House

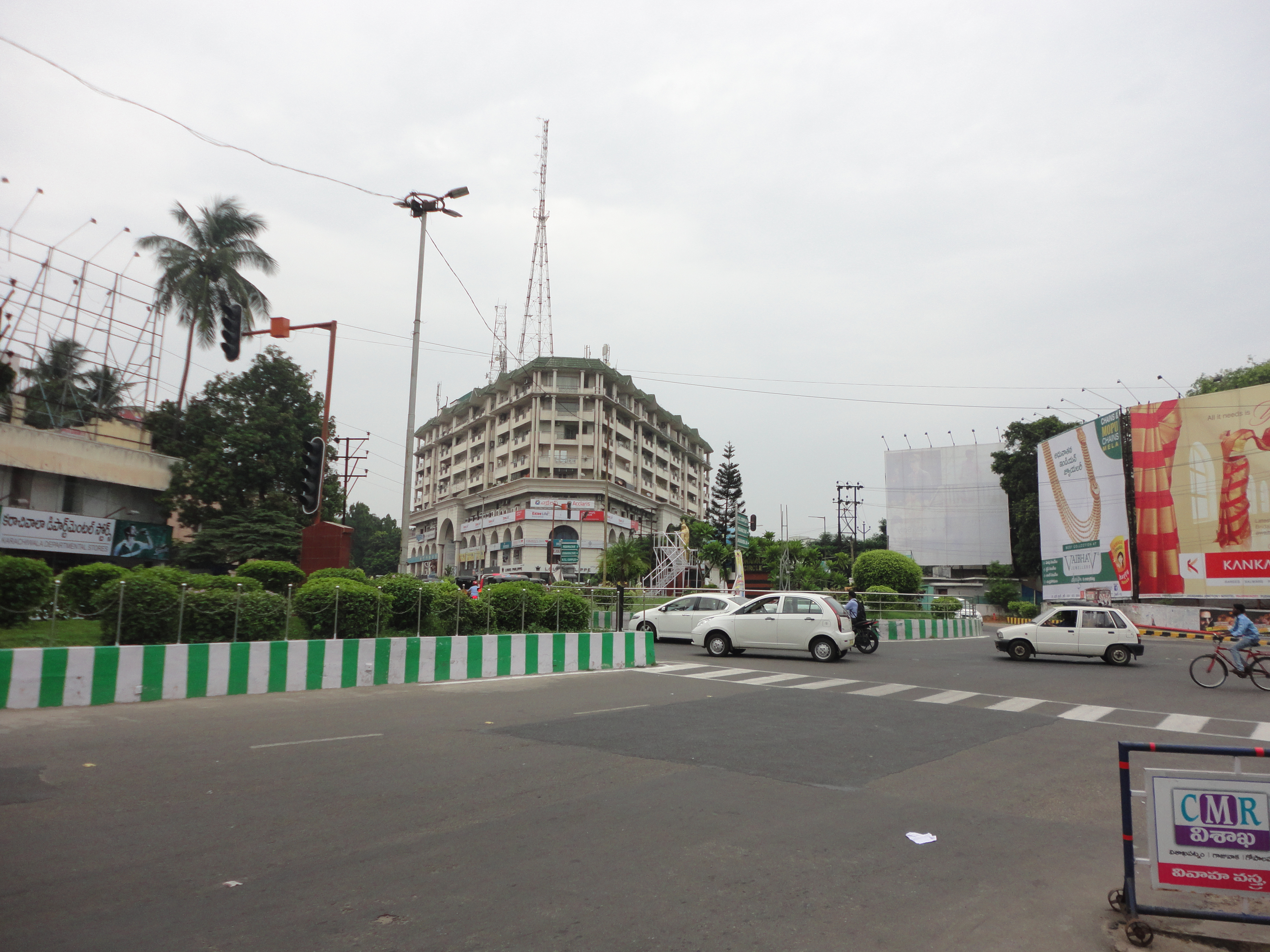
Dutt island at Siripuram

== Transport ==
State-run APS RTC runs city bus services from Dwaraka bus station and various suburbs to this area.
