= NAD Kotha Road =

NAD Kotha Road NAD X Road
- Neighbourhood
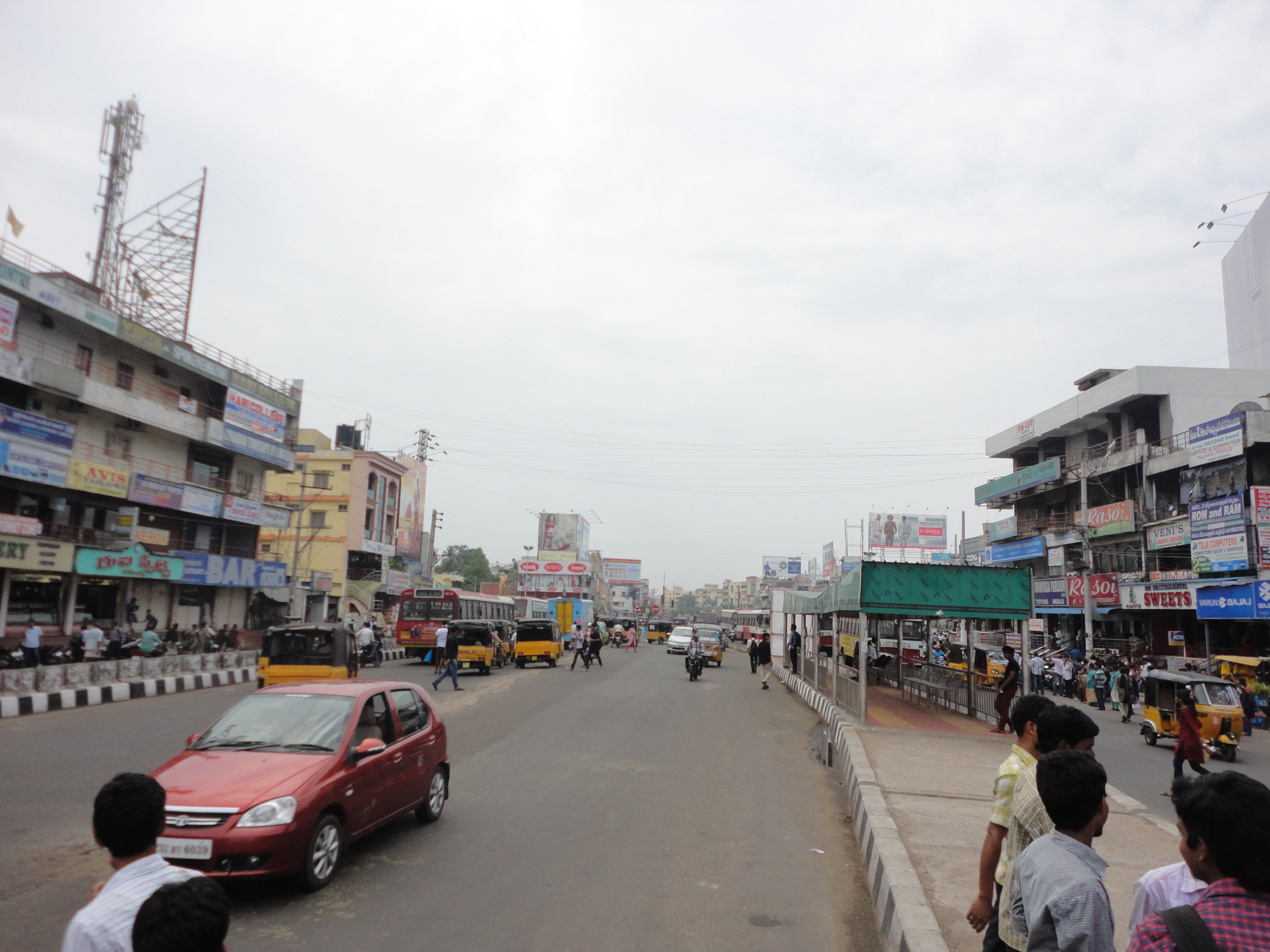

- Location in Visakhapatnam
- Coordinates: 17.742431°N 83.236642°E
- Country: India
- State: Andhra Pradesh
- District: Visakhapatnam

Government
  - Body: Greater Visakhapatnam Municipal Corporation

Languages
  - Official: Telugu
- Time zone: UTC+5:30 (IST)
- PIN: 530009
- Vehicle Registration: AP31, AP32, AP33, AP34 (Former); AP39 (from 30 January 2019)

NAD Kotha Road, or NAD X Road, is one of the major junctions and commercial centers in Visakhapatnam, India. It is named for the Naval Armament Depot. The Naval Armament Depot and Naval Science and Technological Laboratories (NSTL) are located here.

== Commerce ==
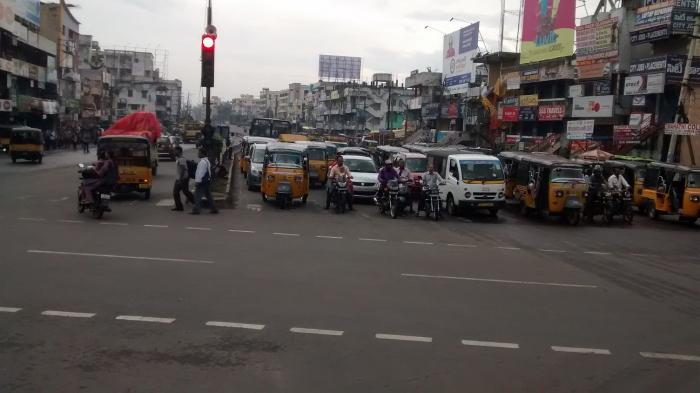
A view of NAD Road

NAD Kotha Road is a busy commercial hub in Visakhapatnam. The NAD Kotha Road Bus Stand, termed the "floating population", attracts migrants from the rest of the country. It has many shops catering to the needs of its residents.

== Transport ==
NAD X Road is well connected within Visakhapatnam. The APSRTC has bus routes to areas such as Gajuwaka, Simhachalam, Asilmetta, Pendurthi, Maddilapalem and city bus stops for long service Towards Hyderabad, Chennai, Bangalore, Vijayawada, Thirupathi, Nellore, Kadapa, Kurnool, Khammam, Narasapuram, Bhimavaram, Tanuku, Rajahmundry, Kakinada, Amalapuram, Srikakulam, Palasa and some other Orissa towns, etc. via NAD X Road. Additional buses are available from the Simhachalam bus depot. Other than Road Transport Corporation, AP, private autorickshaws and taxi conveyances are also available. Due to the educational and training institutions, traffic congestion is common at NAD Kotha Road in the peak timings of morning, evening, and night. There is a rotary-mode flyover connecting four ways and reducing the traffic.

APSRTC routes

Route number	Start	End	Via
38	Gajuwaka	RTC Complex	BHPV, Airport, NAD Kotharoad, Birla Junction, Gurudwar
38K	Kurmannapalem	RTC Complex	Old Gajuwaka, BHPV, Airport, NAD Kotharoad, Birla Junction, Gurudwar
38H	Gantyada HB Colony	RTC Complex	Pedagantyada, New Gajuwaka, Old Gajuwaka, BHPV, Airport, NAD Kotharoad, Birla Junction, Gurudwar
38T	Steel Plant	RTC Complex	Kurmannapalem, Old Gajuwaka, BHPV, Airport, NAD Kotharoad, Birla Junction, Gurudwar
38D	Nadupuru	RTC Complex	Pedagantyada, New Gajuwaka, Old Gajuwaka, BHPV, Airport, NAD Kotharoad, Birla Junction, Gurudwar
38J	Janata Colony	RTC Complex	Sriharipuram, New Gajuwaka, Old Gajuwaka, BHPV, Airport, NAD Kotharoad, Birla Junction, Gurudwar
28	RK Beach	Simhachalam	Jagadamba Centre, RTC Complex, Kancharapalem, NAD Kotharoad, Gopalapatnam
28K/28A	RK Beach	Kothavalasa/Pendurthi	Jagadamba Centre, RTC Complex, Kancharapalem, NAD Kotharoad, Gopalapatnam, Vepagunta
28Z/H	Zilla Parishad	Simhachalam Hill	Jagadamba Centre, RTC Complex, Gurudwara, Birla Junction, NAD Kotharoad, Gopalapatnam
6A/6A/H	RTC Complex	Simhachalam/Simhachalam Hill	Railway Station, Kancharapalem, NAD Kotharoad, Gopalapatnam
6/6H	Old Head Post Office	Simhachalam/Simhachalam Hill	Town Kotharoad, Convent Junction, Kancharapalem, NAD Kotharoad, Gopalapatnam
300C/300M	RTC Complex	Chodavaram/Madugula	Railway Newcolony, Kancharapalem, NAD Kotharoad, Gopalapatnam, Vepagunta, Sabbavaram
555	RTC Complex	Chodavaram	Gurudwara, NAD Kotharoad, Gopalapatnam, Vepagunta, Sabbavaram
55	Scindia	Simhachalam	Malkapuram, Sriharipuram, New Gajuwaka, Old Gajuwaka, BHPV, NAD Kotharoad, Gopalapatnam
55K	Scindia	Kothavalasa	Malkapuram, Sriharipuram, New Gajuwaka, Old Gajuwaka, BHPV, NAD Kotharoad, Gopalapatnam, Vepagunta
541	Maddilapalem	Kothavalasa	Gurudwara, NAD Kotharoad, Gopalapatnam, Vepagunta, Pendurthi
540	MVP Colony	Simhachalam	Venkojipalem, Maddilapalem, Gurudwara, NAD Kotharoad, Gopalapatnam
500	Anakapalle	RTC Complex	Lankelapalem, Kurmannaplem, Old Gajuwaka, BHPV, Airport, NAD Kotharoad, Birla Junction, Gurudwar
747	Vada Chipurupalle	RTC Complex	Parawada, Lankelapalem, Kurmannaplem, Old Gajuwaka, BHPV, Airport, NAD Kotharoad, Birla Junction, Gurudwar
111	Kurmannapalem	Tagarapuvalasa	Old Gajuwaka, BHPV, NAD Kotharoad, Gurudwar, Maddilapalem, Hanumanthuwaka, Madhurawada, Anandapuram

== Education ==
NAD X Road is home to many educational institutions, commercial coaching and training centers.
