= Marripalem =

- Neighbourhood
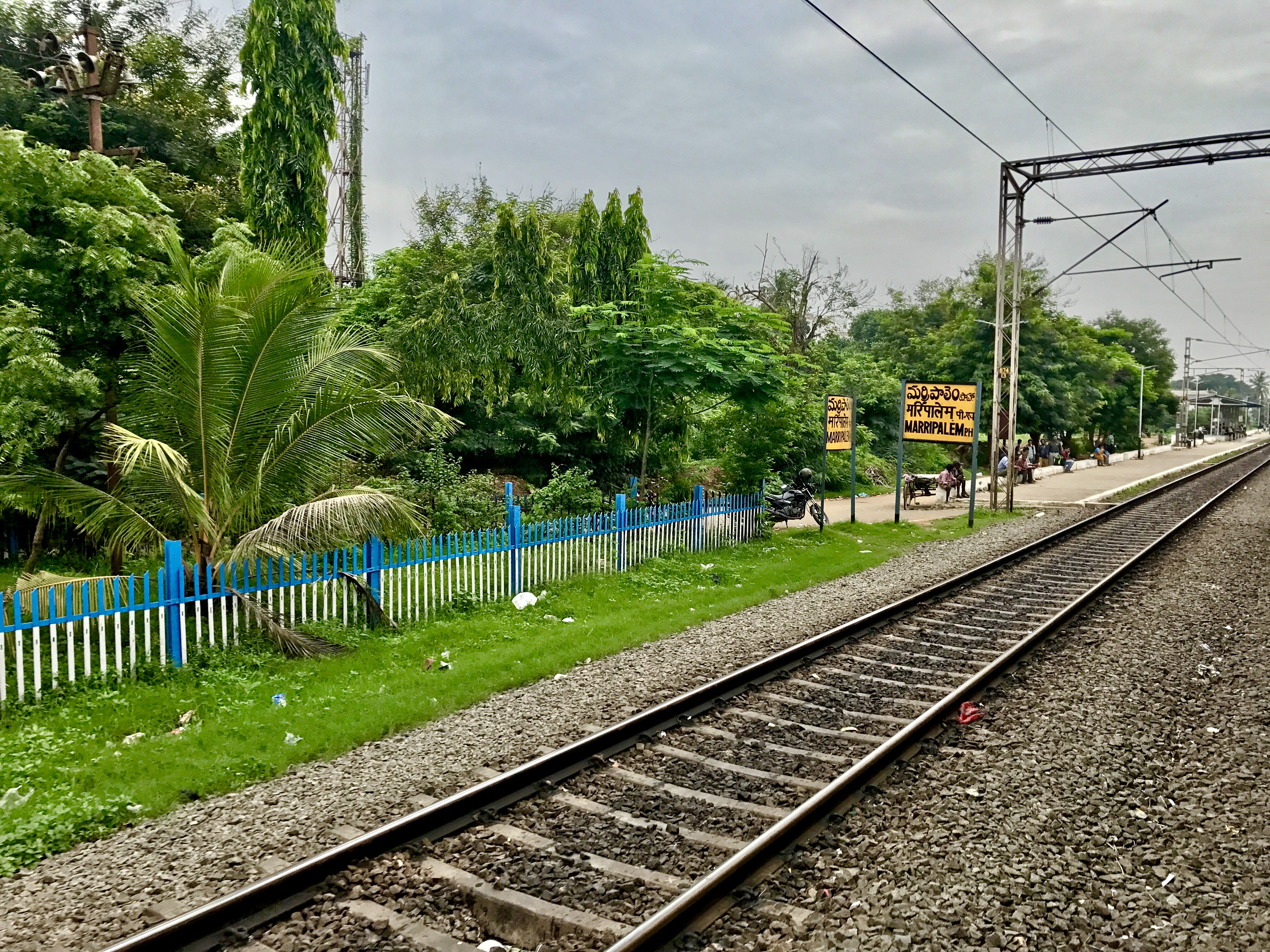
- Marripalem railway station signboard

- Location in Visakhapatnam
- Coordinates: 17.740763°N 83.251378°E
- Country: India
- State: Andhra Pradesh
- District: Visakhapatnam

Government
  - Body: Greater Visakhapatnam Municipal Corporation

Languages
  - Official: Telugu
- Time zone: UTC+5:30 (IST)
- PIN: 530018
- Vehicle registration: AP

Marripalem is a neighbourhood area in Visakhapatnam. It is a residential area in the city. It has many population settlements with high raised buildings and apartments.

== Commercial Area ==
Marripalem is a commercial center with many kinds of shops, markets, and hospitals.

== Transport ==
There is a railway quarters and a passenger halt station. Ordinary trains do not halt at this station. It is very near to Visakhapatnam railway station. Now it will develop as a terminal station. Marripalem is a part of BRTS corridor from Dwaraka bus station to Pendurthi.

== Gallery ==
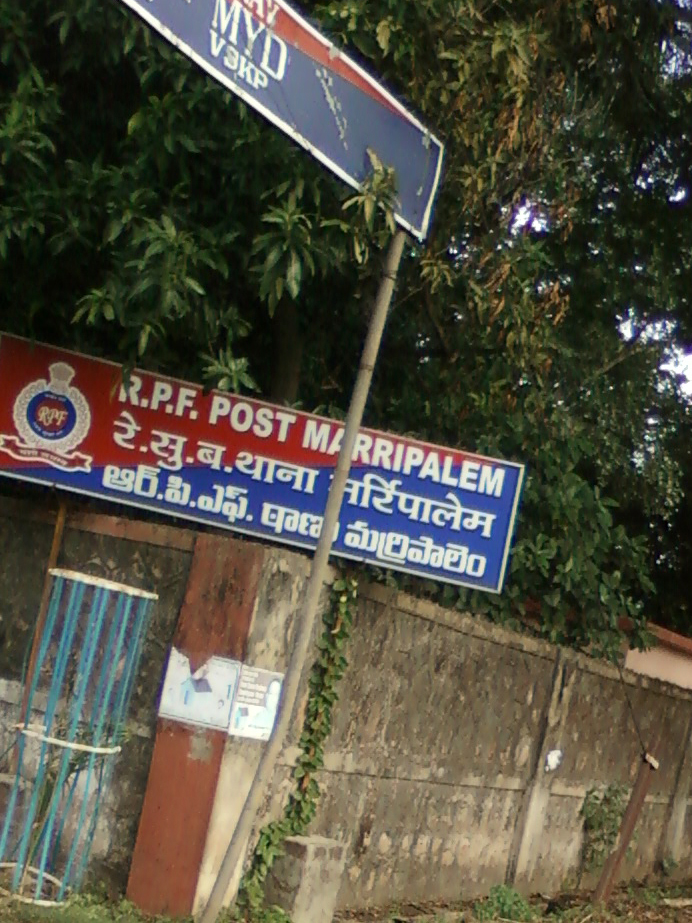
RPF post at Marripalem

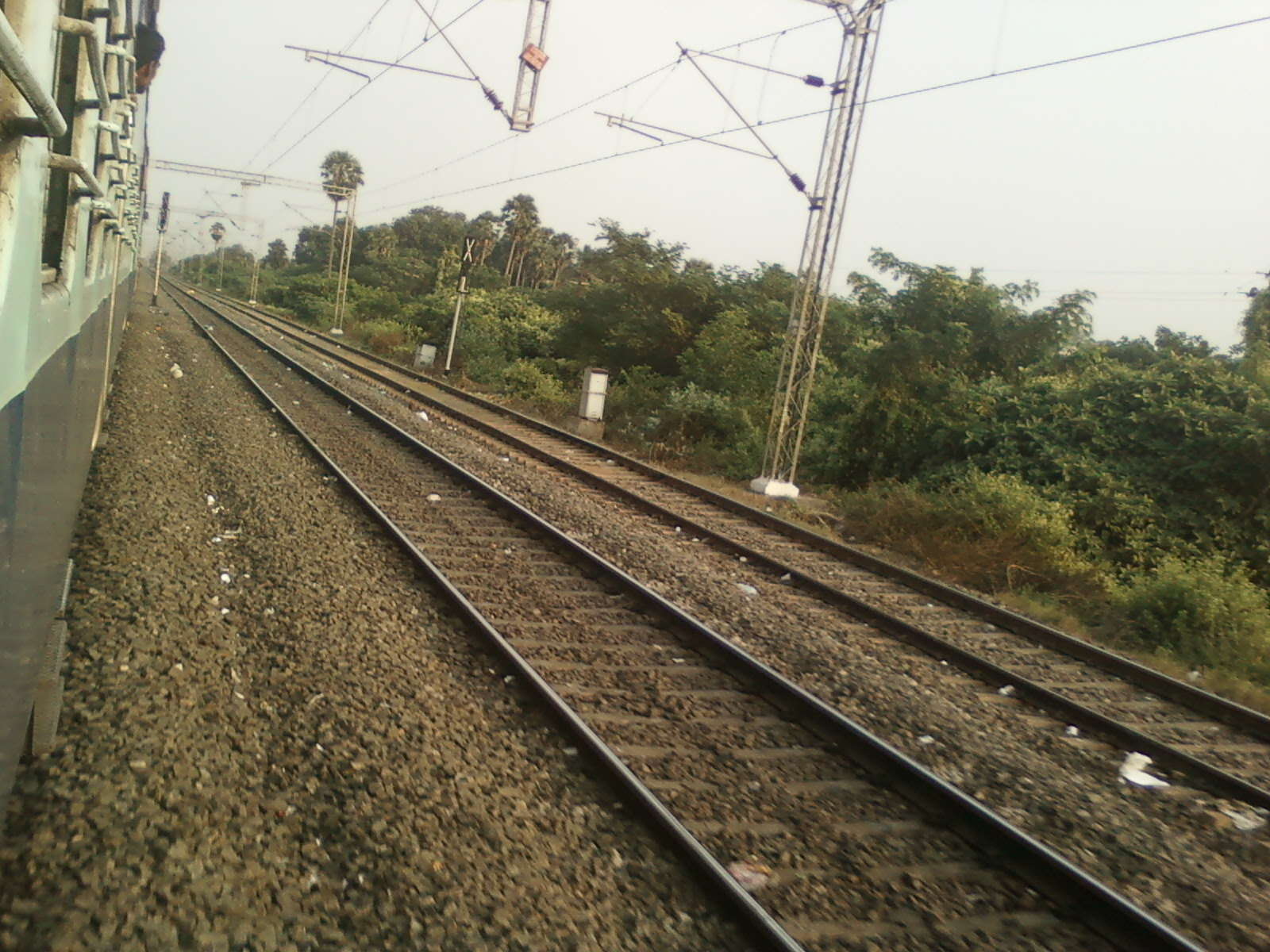
Railway Tracks near Marripalem

[1]
