= Vepagunta =

- Neighbourhood
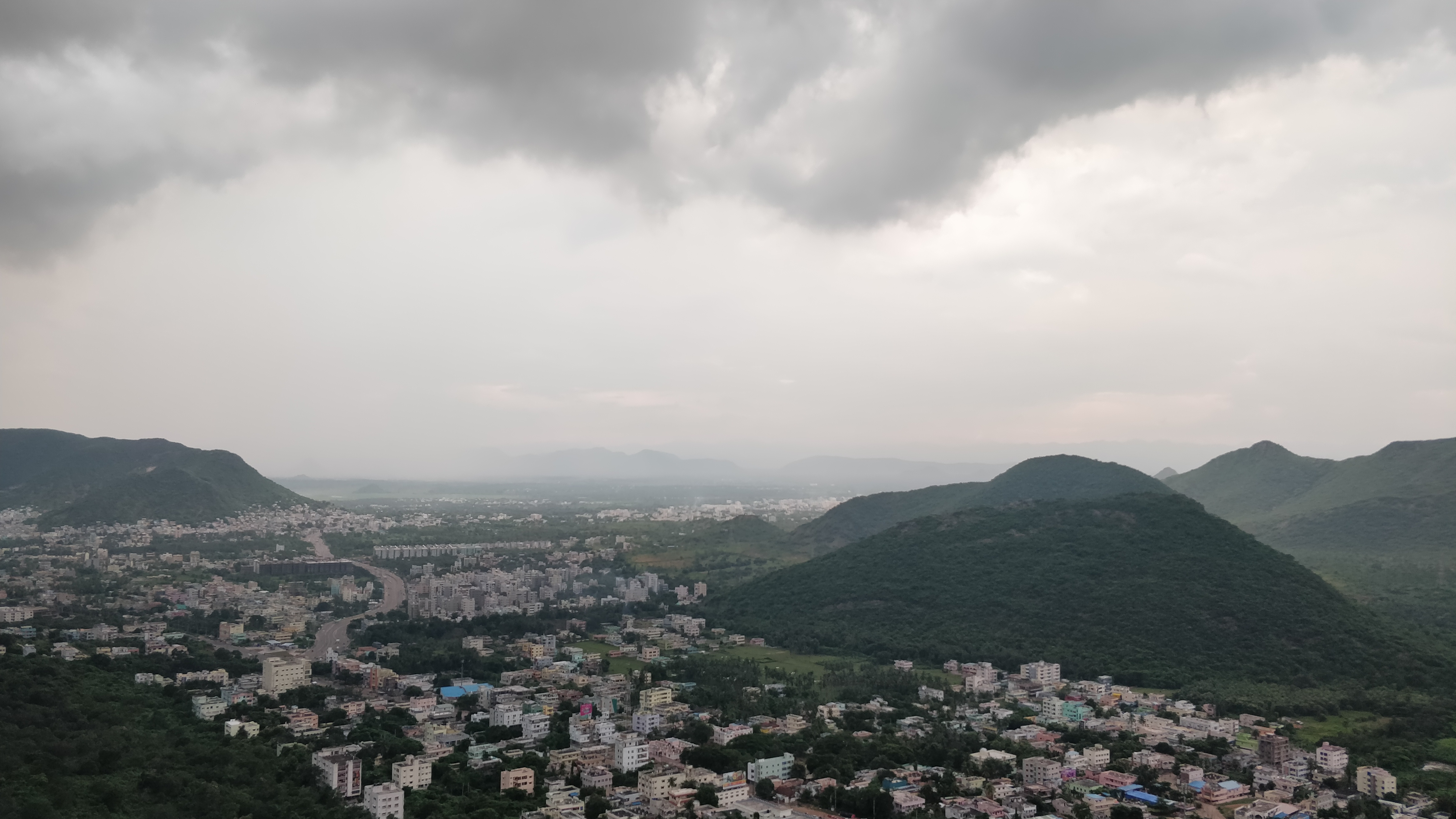
- Vepagunta area from Simhachalam Hill

- Location in Visakhapatnam
- Coordinates: 17.77987°N 83.213925°E
- Country: India
- State: Andhra Pradesh
- District: Visakhapatnam
- Established: B.C 143
- Founder: lovely

Government
  - Type: people's government
  - Body: Greater Visakhapatnam Municipal Corporation

Population (2001)
  - Total: 26,881

Languages
  - Official: Telugu
- Time zone: UTC+5:30 (IST)
- Postal code: 530047

Vepagunta is a suburb in Visakhapatnam city. It comes under Pendurthi revenue division.

== Demographics ==
As of 2001 India census, Vepagunta had a population of 26,881. Males constitute 51% of the population and females 49%. Vepagunta has an average literacy rate of 73%, higher than the national average of 59.5%: male literacy is 80%, and female literacy is 67%. In Vepagunta, 10% of the population is under 6 years of age.

== Transport ==
APSRTC routes

Route number	Start	End	Via
28K/28A	RK Beach	Kothavalasa/Pendurthi	Jagadamba Centre, RTC Complex, Kancharapalem, NAD Kotharoad, Gopalapatnam, Vepagunta
28J	RK Beach	Sujatha Nagar	Jagadamba Centre, RTC Complex, Railway Station, Kancharapalem, NAD Kotharoad, Gopalapatnam, Vepagunta
28C	RK Beach	Chintalagraharam	Jagadamba Centre, RTC Complex, Gurudwara, Birla Junction, NAD Kotharoad, Gopalapatnam, Vepagunta
28P	RK Beach	Pinagadi	Jagadamba Centre, RTC Complex, Gurudwara, Birla Junction, NAD Kotharoad, Gopalapatnam, Vepagunta
333K	Town Kotharoad	K.Kotapad	Town Kotharoad, Convent Junction, Kancharapalem, NAD Kotharoad, Gopalapatnam, Vepagunta, Pinagadi
300C/300M	RTC Complex	Chodavaram/Madugula	Railway Newcolony, Kancharapalem, NAD Kotharoad, Gopalapatnam, Vepagunta, Sabbavaram
555	RTC Complex	Chodavaram	Gurudwara, NAD Kotharoad, Gopalapatnam, Vepagunta, Sabbavaram
55K	Scindia	Kothavalasa	Malkapuram, Sriharipuram, New Gajuwaka, Old Gajuwaka, BHPV, NAD Kotharoad, Gopalapatnam, Vepagunta
541	Maddilapalem	Kothavalasa	Gurudwara, NAD Kotharoad, Gopalapatnam, Vepagunta, Pendurthi
12D	RTC Complex	Devarapalle	Gurudwara, NAD Kotharoad, Gopalapatnam, Vepagunta, Pendurthi, Kothavalasa
