= Pendurti railway station =

Railway station in Andhra Pradesh, India

Pendurti
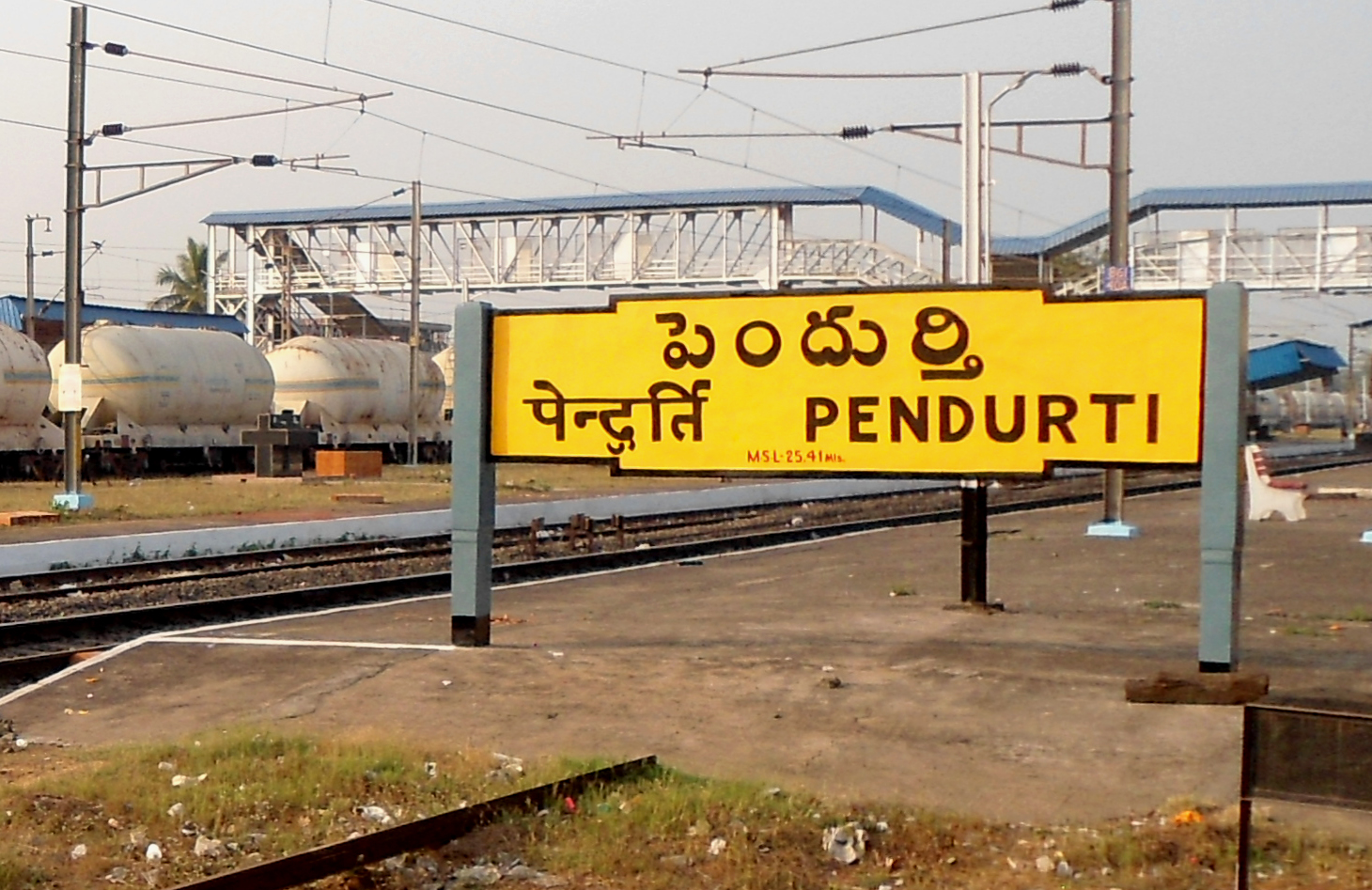

General information
- Location: Pendurti, Visakhapatnam, Andhra Pradesh; India
- Coordinates: 17.814079°N 83.195277°E
- Elevation: 30 m (98 ft)
- System: Indian Railways station
- Line: Visakhapatnam–Vijayawada section of Howrah–Chennai main line
- Platforms: 7
- Tracks: 5 ft 6 in (1,676 mm) broad gauge

Construction
- Structure type: Standard (on-ground station)
- Parking: Available

Other information
- Status: Functioning
- Station code: PDT
- Zone(s): South Coast Railway
- Division(s): Visakhapatnam
Location
- Location within Visakhapatnam

Pendurti railway station (station code:PDT),, located in the Indian state of Andhra Pradesh, serves Pendurti in Visakhapatnam . It lies on the Howrah–Chennai main line.

== See also ==
- Visakhapatnam railway division

Preceding station	Indian Railways	Following station
Simhachalam towards ?	South Coast Railway zone Visakhapatnam–Vijayawada section of Howrah–Chennai main line	Kothavalasa towards ?
