= Maddilapalem =

- Neighbourhood
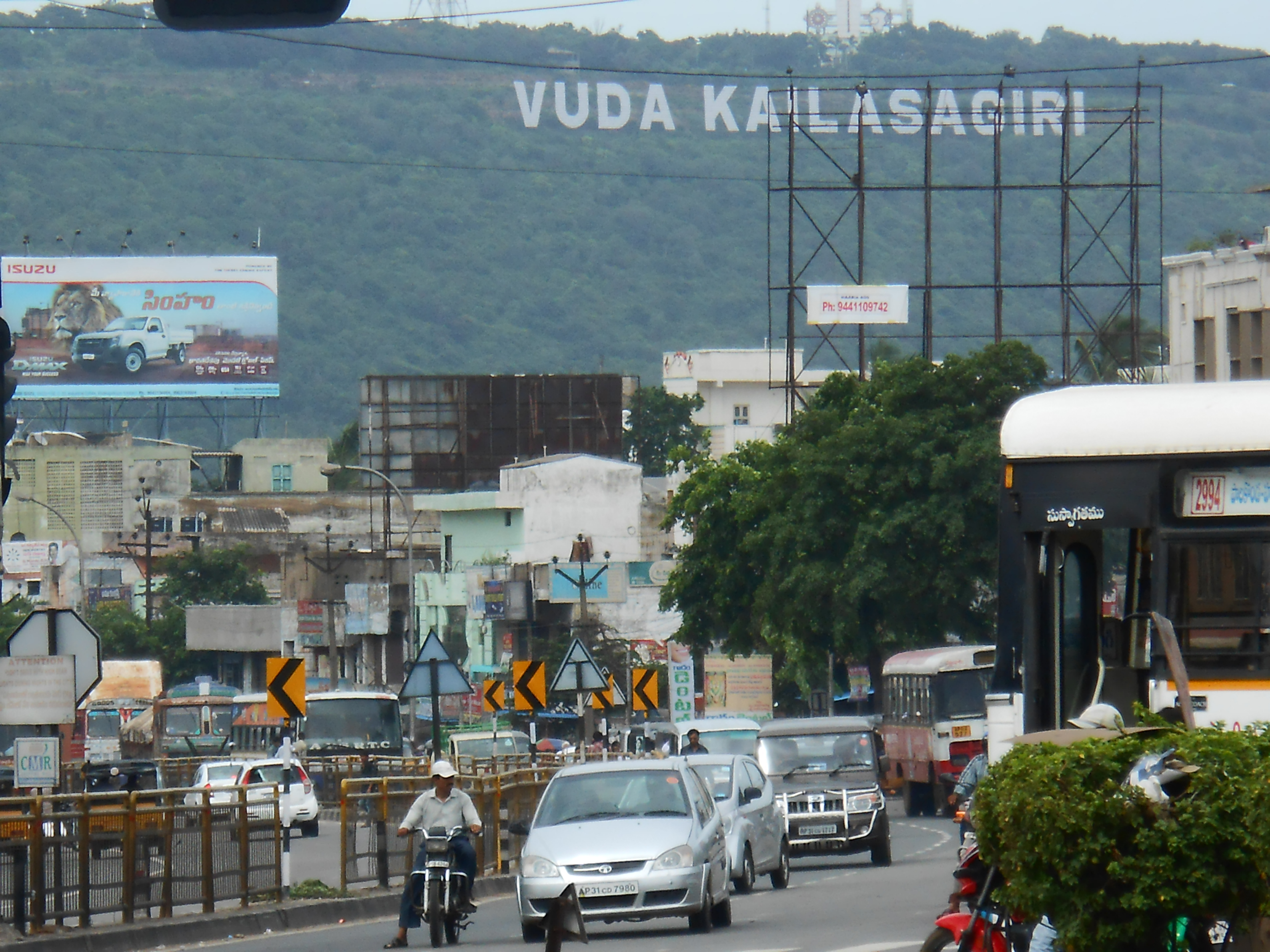
- Kailasagiri View from Maddilapalem Centre

- Location in Visakhapatnam
- Coordinates: 17.738224°N 83.323039°E
- Country: India
- State: Andhra Pradesh
- District: Visakhapatnam

Government
  - Body: Greater Visakhapatnam Municipal Corporation

Languages
  - Official: Telugu
- Time zone: UTC+5:30 (IST)
- PIN: 530013
- Vehicle registration: AP 31, AP 32 and AP 33

Maddilapalem is an area of Visakhapatnam, in the Indian state of Andhra Pradesh.

Maddilapalem was initially a small suburb outside of Visakhapatnam.

== Economy ==
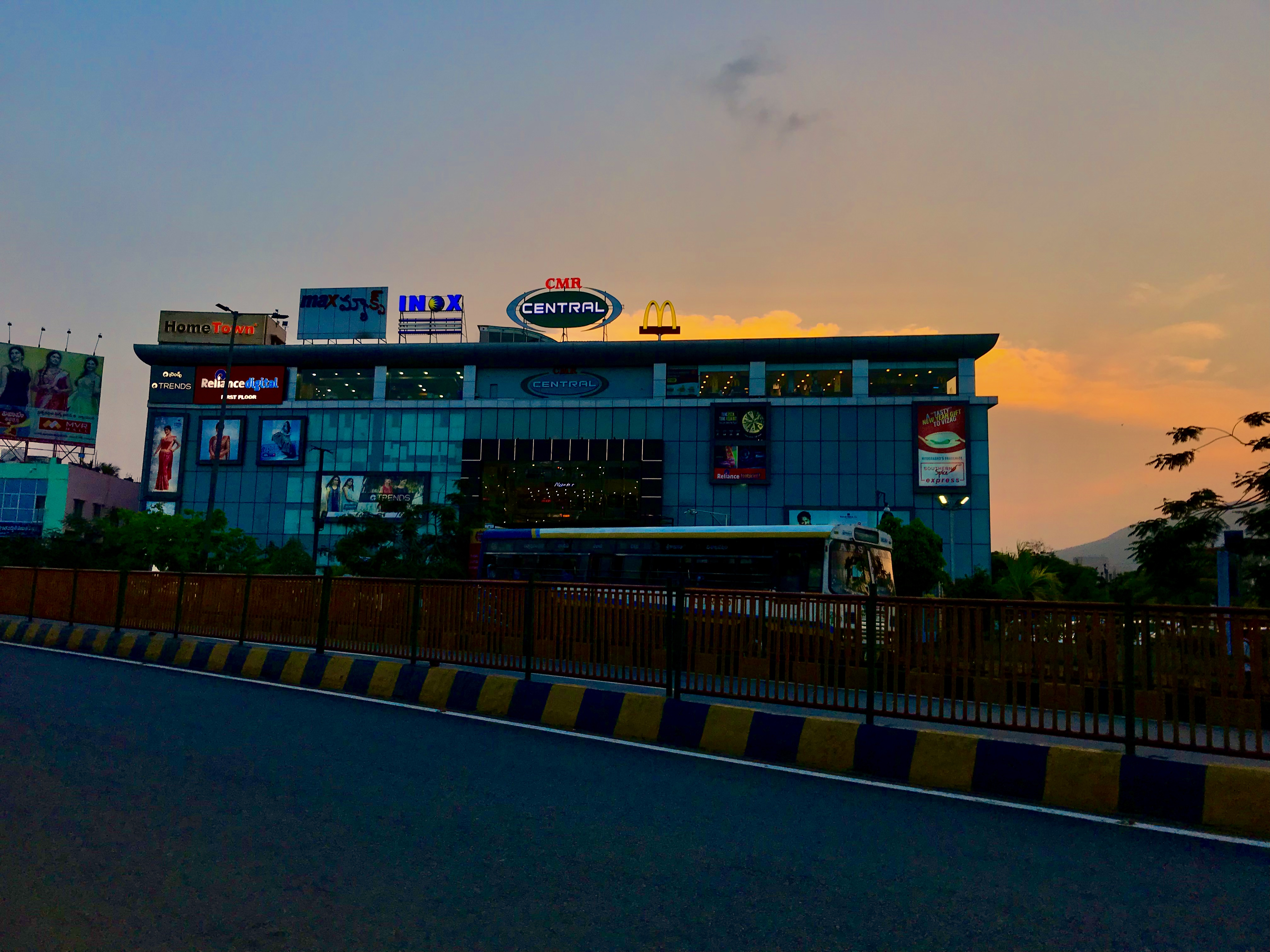
CMR Central at Maddilapalem

Maddilapalem is one of the major commercial and residential suburbs of Visakhapatnam. Ashok Leyland Auto Manufactures and Jayabheri Maruthi Institutions are located there.

CMR Central is located at Maddilapalem Junction. It is one of the largest shopping malls in Visakhapatnam City.

== Transport ==
Maddilapalem is home to one of the busiest transport hubs in Visakhapatnam. Visakhapatnam BRTS connects Maddilapalem to Asilmetta.

Maddilapalem Junction is among the busiest in the city. The roads leading from the junction lead to Asilmetta, Dwaraka Nagar, and Madhurawada. Maddilapalem is connected by the National Highway.

APSRTC operates a bus depot and bus station. Buses are run by the state-owned APSRTC, and connect to all parts of Visakhapatnam.

== Education ==
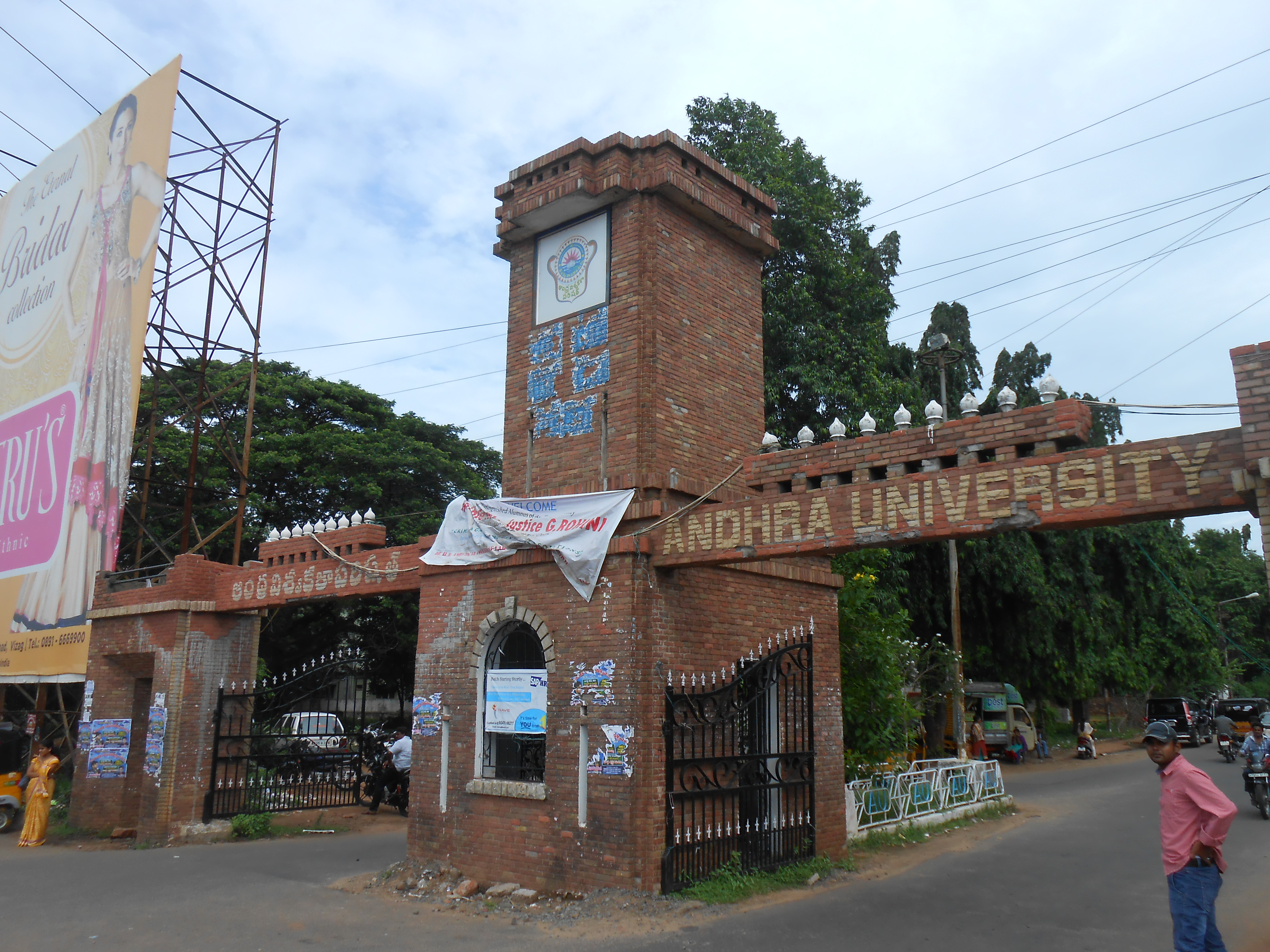
Main Gate of AU Engineering College, at Maddilapalem

Maddilapalem is home to many educational institutions and commercial coaching and training centers. Andhra University College of Engineering and Dr. V. S. Krishna Govt. Degree & P.G College are situated there.

== Amenities ==
Kalabharathi Auditorium is in Pithapuram Colony.
