= Pendurthi =

- Neighbourhood
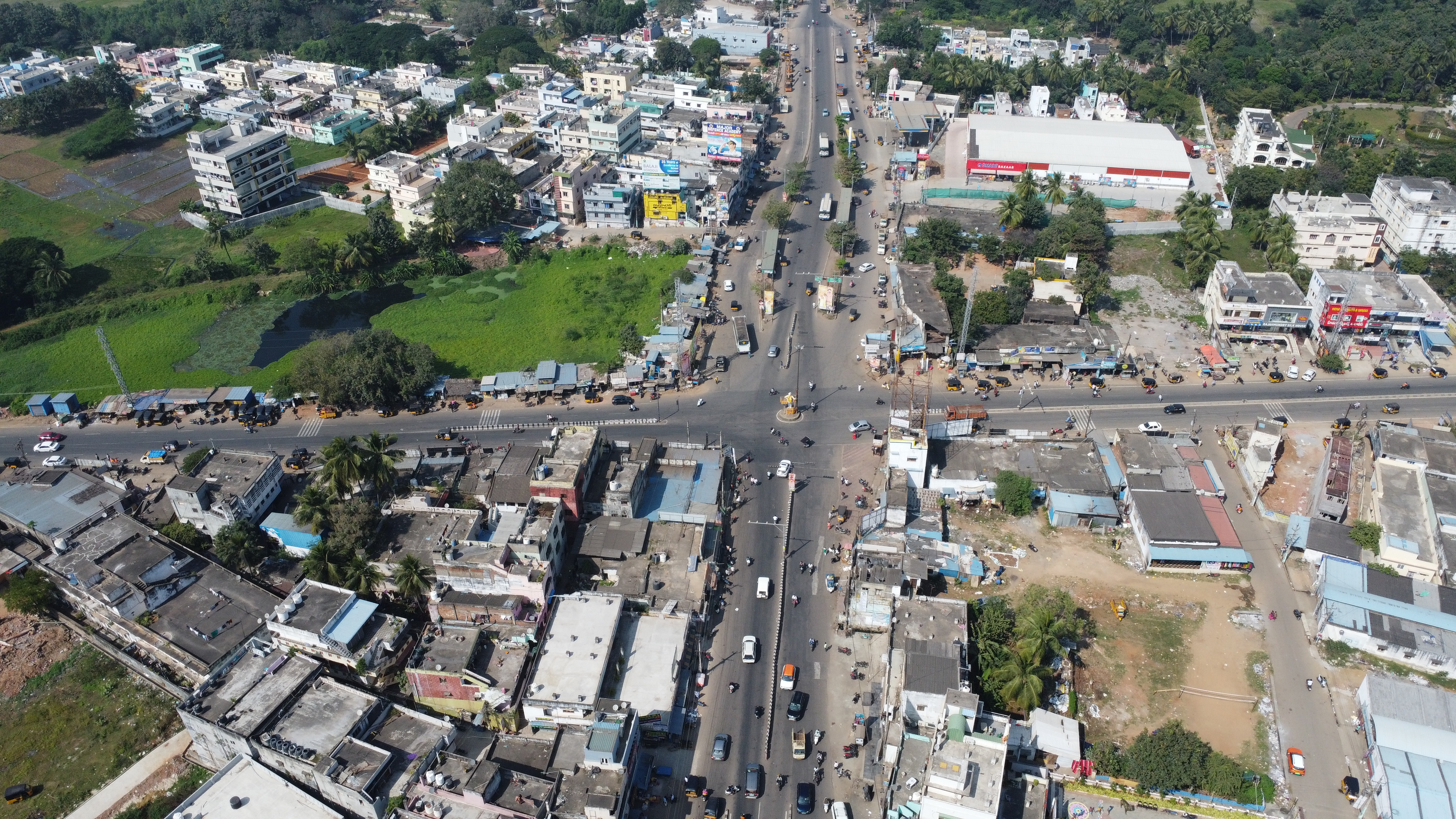
- Pendurthi junction aerial view

- Location in Visakhapatnam
- Coordinates: 17.8333°N 83.2000°E
- Country: India
- State: Andhra Pradesh
- District: Visakhapatnam
- City: Visakhapatnam
- Founder: Government of Andhra Pradesh

Government
  - Type: Mayor-council
  - Body: Greater Visakhapatnam Municipal Corporation
  - MLA: Panchakarla Ramesh Babu

Area
  - Total: 118.85 km^{2} (45.89 sq mi)
- Elevation: 22 m (72 ft)

Languages
  - Official: Telugu
- Time zone: UTC+5:30 (IST)
- PIN: 531173
- Vehicle Registration: AP31 (Former); AP39 (from 30 January 2019)

Pendurthi is a neighbourhood in the city of Visakhapatnam, India. The neighbourhood is considered as the major residential and commercial area in the city. It is located within the jurisdiction of the Greater Visakhapatnam Municipal Corporation, which is responsible for the civic amenities in Pendurthi. It is located on the west fringe of Visakhapatnam city. Pendurthi is one of the peaceful neighborhoods of Western Vizag. The pincode of Pendurthi is 531173.

== Demography ==
In Pendurthi Mandal, located in Visakhapatnam district, the population recorded during the 2011 Census was 146,650 individuals. Among them, there were 73,434 males and 73,216 females. The Mandal was home to 37,440 families in the same year. The Average Sex Ratio in Pendurthi Mandal stands at 997.

According to the 2011 Census, 77.9% of the total population resides in urban regions, whereas 22.1% resides in rural areas. The literacy rate averages 82.3% in urban zones and 67.9% in rural zones within Pendurthi Mandal. Additionally, the Sex Ratio is 992 in urban areas and 1,015 in rural areas of Pendurthi Mandal as per the same census.

The count of children aged 0-6 years in Pendurthi Mandal is 13,853, constituting 9% of the overall population. Among them, there are 7,103 male children and 6,750 female children. Therefore, based on the 2011 Census, the Child Sex Ratio in Pendurthi Mandal is 950, which is lower than the average Sex Ratio of 997 in the same area.

The overall literacy rate in Pendurthi Mandal stands at 79.12%. Specifically, the male literacy rate is 77.53%, while the female literacy rate is 65.74% within the same area.

It has 1 town and 15 villages in total.

1. Cheemalapalle
2. Chintagatla
3. Gorapalle
4. Gurrampalem
5. Jerripothulapalem
6. Juthada
7. Lakshmi Puram
8. Mudapaka
9. Peddagadi
10. Pinagadi
11. Rajayyapeta
12. Rampuram
13. Saripalle
14. Sowbhagya Rayapuram
15. Valimeraka

== Transport ==
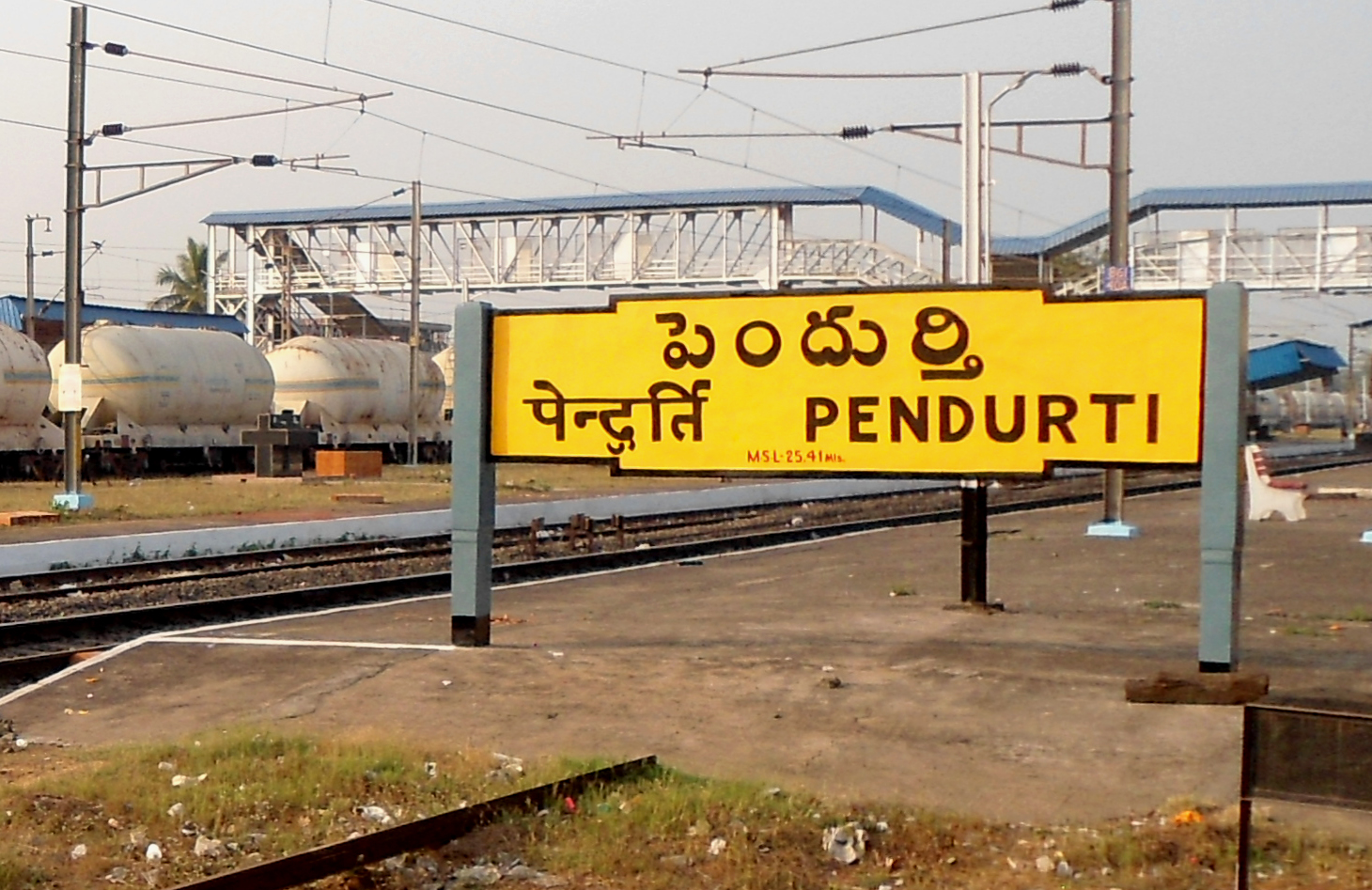
- Pendurthi Railway station west end
  Pendurti railway station is a satellite railway station of Vizag, and is located on Howrah-Chennai mainline. This station has no halt for express and super fast express trains, some passenger trains stop at this station namely, Visakhapatnam-Rayagada passenger, Visakhapatnam-Vizianagaram DEMU, Visakhapatnam-Gunupur fast, Visakhapatnam-Palasa DEMU, Visakhapatnam-Kirandul passenger, Chattrapur-Bhadrak-Visakhapatnam passenger via Brahmapur, Visakhapatnam-Durg passenger have halt in Pendurthi railway station. There is a demand from the local residents to halt the express trains like Guntur-Rayagada express, Bhubaneswar-Secunderabad Visakha express, Bilaspur-Tirupati express, Puri-Tirupati express, Visakhapatnam-Bhubaneswar Intercity express, Bhubaneswar-Mumbai Konark express, Yashwantpur-Hatia express, Alleppy-Dhanbad express, Howrah-Hyderabad East coast express, Visakhapatnam-New Delhi Samata express.
- It has a BRTS (Bus Rapid Transport System) corridor from Vizag city. One corridor is Pendurthi-NAD X Road-Railway station corridor and the other one is Pendurthi-Simhachalam-Hanumathawaka corridor, the roads have an extension of up to 200 feet.
- The newly constructed 6 Lane NH16 expressway passes through Old Pendurthi.
- The Raipur-Visakhapatnam expressway is 5 km away from Pendurthi.
- Tram lane is proposed from NAD X roads to Pendurthi in a stretch of 10km.

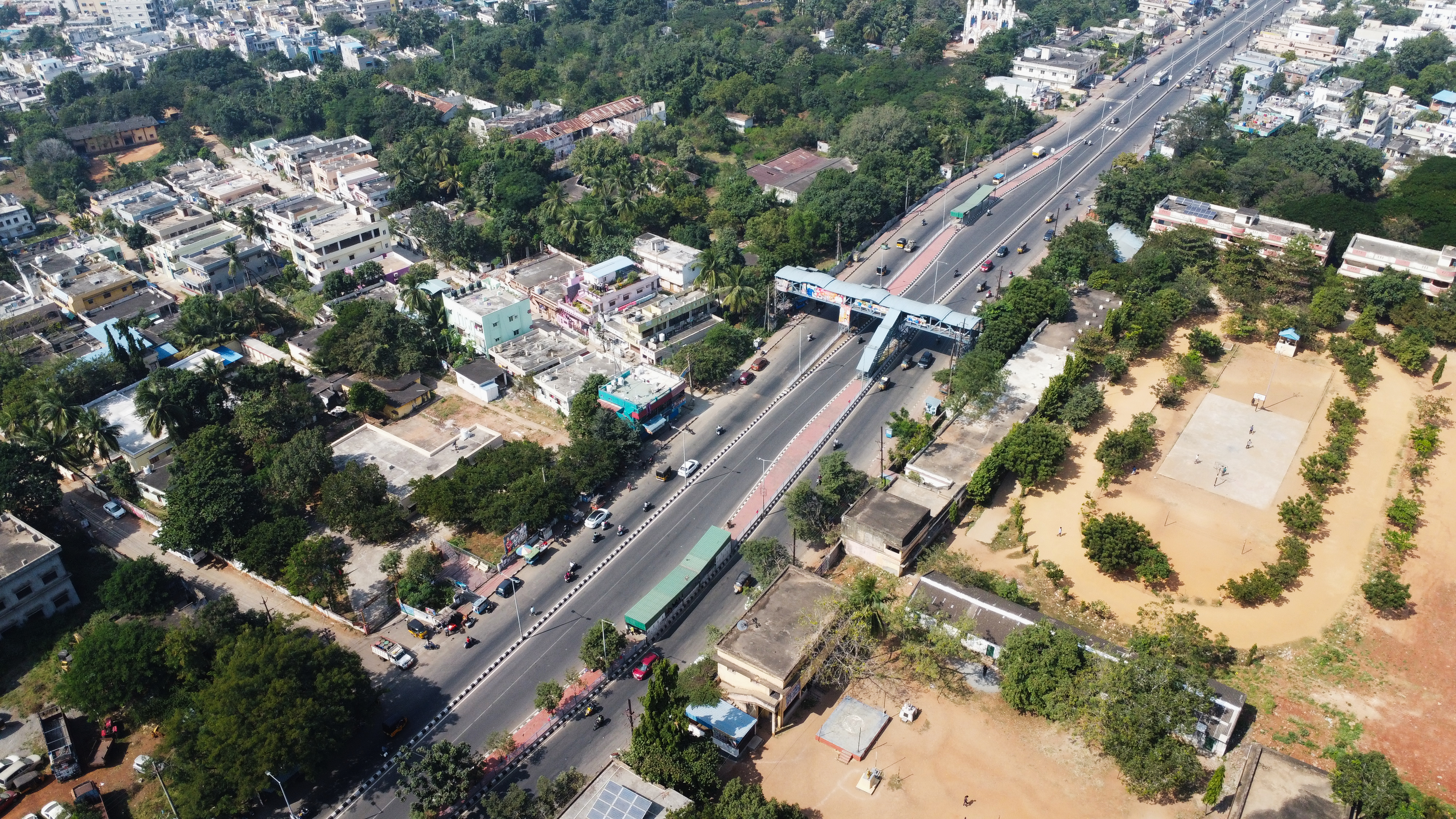
Aerial view of BRTS road and Pendurthi government college

APSRTC to run buses every place to here.

APSRTC routes

Route number	Start	End	Via
28A/28K	Pendurthi/Kothavalasa	RK Beach	Vepagunta, Gopalapatnam, NAD Kotharoad, Kancharapalem, RTC Complex, Jagadamba Centre
6K	Kothavalasa	Old Head Post Office	Pendurthi, Vepagunta, Gopalapatnam, NAD Kotharoad, Kancharapalem, Convent, Town Kotharoad
68K	Kothavalasa	RK Beach	Pendurthi, Vepagunta, Simhachalam, Adavivaram, Arilova, Hanumanthuwaka, Maddilapalem, RTC Complex, Jagadamba Centre
541	Kothavalasa	Maddilapalem	Pendurthi, Vepagunta, Gopalapatnam, NAD Kotharoad, Birla Junction, Gurudwar, Satyam Junction
555	RTC Complex	Chodavaram	RTC Complex, Gurudwar, Birla Junction, NAD, Gopalpatnam, Pendurthi, Subbavaram, Chodavaram
12D	Devarapalle	RTC Complex	Kothavalasa, Pendurthi, Vepagunta, Gopalapatnam, NAD Kotharoad, Birla Junction, Gurudwar
201	Srungavarapukota	RTC Complex	Kothavalasa, Pendurthi, Vepagunta, Gopalapatnam, NAD Kotharoad, Birla Junction, Gurudwar
888	Anakapalle	Tagarapuvalasa	Sankaram, Sabbavaram, Pendurthi, Shontyam, Gudilova, Anandapuram
55K	Kothavalasa	Scindia	Pendurthi, Vepagunta, Gopalapatnam, NAD Kotharoad, Airport, BHPV, Old Gajuwaka, New Gajuwaka, Malkapuram
55P	Pendurthi	Duvvada	Pendurthi, Vepagunta, Gopalapatnam, NAD Kotharoad, Airport, BHPV, Old Gajuwaka, Duvvada
300C	RTC Complex	Chodavaram	RTC Complex, Railway Station, Thatichettupalem, Kancharapalem, Urvasi, NAD Junction, Gopalapatnam, Vepagunta, Pendurthi Junction, Pingadi Junction, Pataroad, Sabbavaram, Gotiwada, Adduru, Venkannapalem, Gajapatinagaram, Chodavaram

== Legislative Assembly ==
Pendurthi is an assembly constituency in Andhra Pradesh. There are 3,76,860 registered voters in Pendurthi constituency in 1999 elections.

Year	Candidate	Party
1978	Gudivada Appanna	INC(I)
1983	Petakamsetti Appalanarasimham	TDP
1985	Alla Ramachandra Rao	TDP
1989	Gudivada Gurunadha Rao	INC
1994	M Anjaneyulu	CPI
1999	PGVR Naidu (Ganababu)	TDP
2004	Tippala Gurumurthy Reddy	INC
2009	Panchakarla Ramesh Babu	PRP
2014	Bandaru Satyanarayana	TDP
2019	Annamreddy Adeep Raj	YSRCP
2024	Panchakarla Ramesh Babu	JSP

== See also ==
- Pendurthi (Assembly constituency)
