= Dwaraka Nagar =

- Neighbourhood
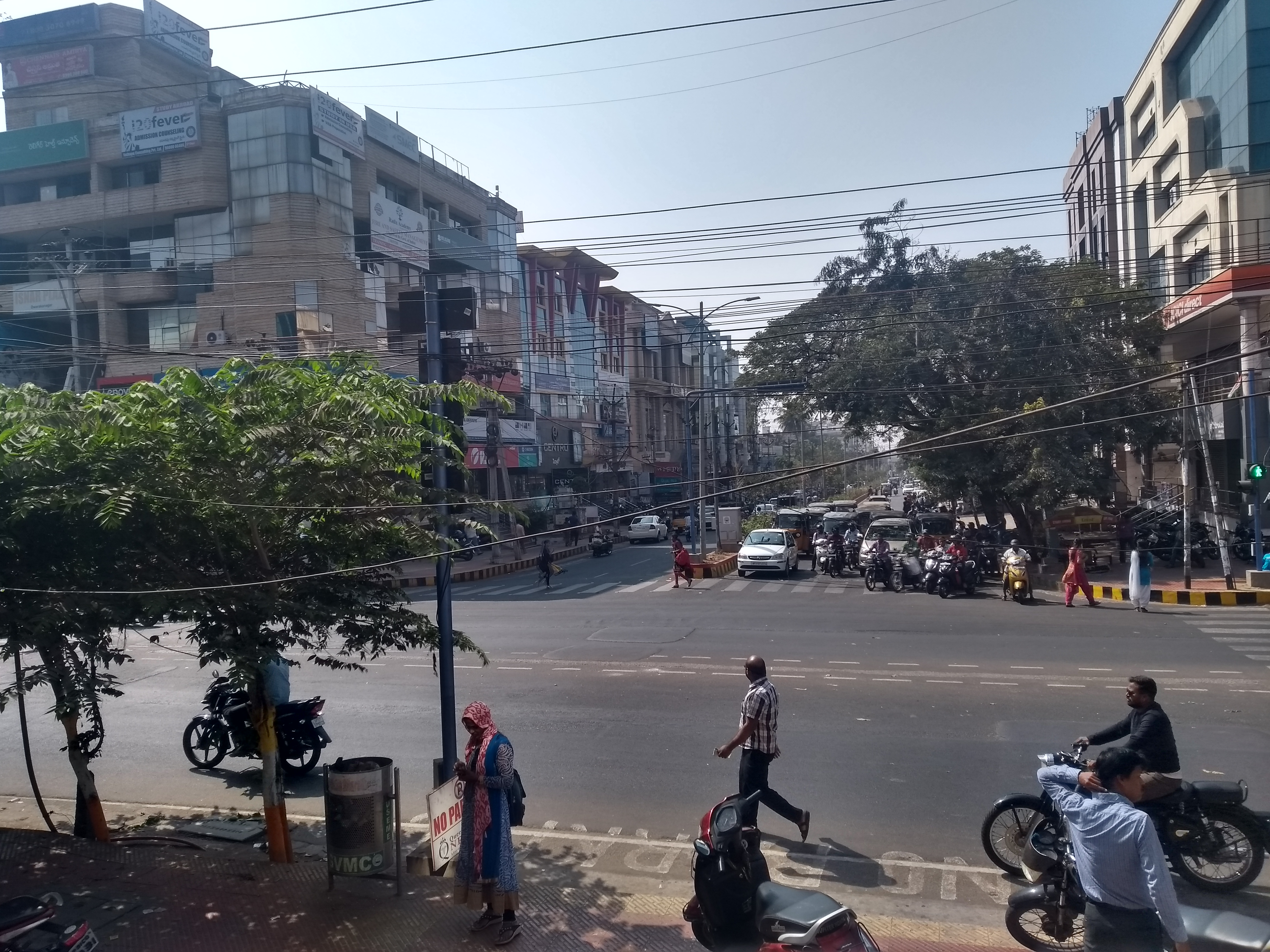
- Dwaraka Nagar 2nd Lane

- Location in Visakhapatnam
- Coordinates: 17.728670°N 83.308634°E
- Country: India
- State: Andhra Pradesh
- District: Visakhapatnam

Government
  - Body: Greater Visakhapatnam Municipal Corporation

Languages
  - Official: Telugu
- Time zone: UTC+5:30 (IST)
- PIN: 530016
- Vehicle registration: AP 31, AP 32 and AP 33

Dwaraka Nagar is a locality in Visakhapatnam of Andhra Pradesh, India. It is one of the main commercial areas in the city. It is a hub for many shopping malls, educational institutes, hotels, lodges, food courts, restaurants, coaching centers etc.

== Commerce ==
It is the major commercial area in Visakhapatnam. It is the business center for all types of outlets and offices.

== Transport ==
Dwaraka Nagar is the Bus Transportation hub of Visakhapatnam. Central bus station of the city, Dwaraka bus station is located in this neighborhood.

== Gallery ==
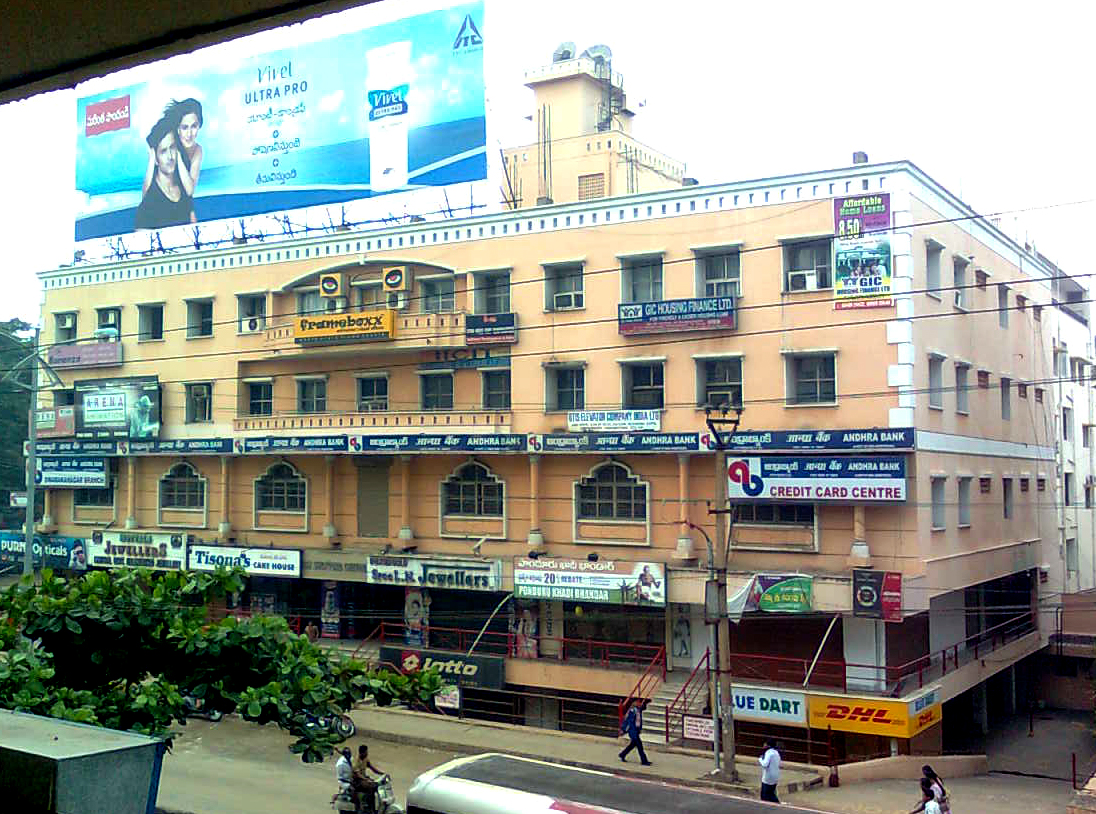
Andhra Bank Complex at Dwarakanagar.

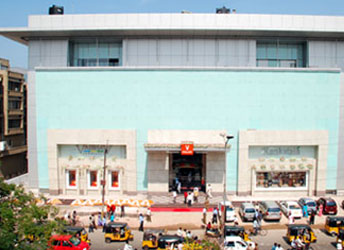
Vsquare shopping mall at Dwarakanagar.
