= Dwaraka bus station =

Bus station in Visakhapatnam, India

Dwaraka Bus Station Complex

General information
- Location: APSRTC Complex, Dwaraka Nagar, Visakhapatnam, Andhra Pradesh; India
- Coordinates: 17.723721°N 83.307225°E
- System: ISBT
- Owner: APSRTC

Construction
- Parking: Available
Location
- Location within Visakhapatnam

Dwaraka Bus Station Complex is a bus station located at the eastern side of Visakhapatnam city. It is officially called APSRTC complex. The bus station is owned by Andhra Pradesh State Road Transport Corporation (APSRTC). This is one of the major bus stations in Andhra Pradesh. Many buses from other states like Karnataka, Tamil Nadu, Odissa, Chhattisgarh and Telangana arrive at the station. Buses provide their services to all the major cities, towns in the state and also within the city as well. The city services has a city bus terminus on south-east of the bus station. It is situated in 6.7 acres.

== History ==
The Dwaraka Bus Station (DBS Complex), popularly known as RTC Complex, is being given a major facelift at an estimated cost of Rs. 80 lakh. The foundation for the RTC Complex was laid by the then Chief Minister Jalagam Vengala Rao on 13 October 1974 and it was opened in 1979.

== Expansion ==
New CCTVs, painting of the walls and paneling of the pillars are some of the works that are being undertaken inside the complex. Apart from 33 modern chairs, the AC lounge has two cozy beds for the convenience of senior citizens and sick persons, who wish to take a nap as they await the arrival of their bus. At present there is 30 platforms.

== City buses ==
Numerous city buses operate from the Bus Station Complex to nearly every part of the city. Busses which originate from RTC complex are 6A/H, 300C, 12D, 500, 500A, 500A/V, 38, 38D, 38H, 400N, 400Y, 400, 222, 999 and 900K.
