= Anakapalli mandal =

- Mandal
- Interactive map of Anakapalli mandal
- Location in Andhra Pradesh, India
- Coordinates: 17.6913°N 83.0039°E
- Country: India
- State: Andhra Pradesh
- Region: Coastal Andhra
- District: Anakapalli
- Headquarters: Anakapalli

Area
  - Total: 169.62 km^{2} (65.49 sq mi)

Population (2011)
  - Total: 186,937
  - Density: 1,102.1/km^{2} (2,854.4/sq mi)

Languages
  - Official: Telugu
- Time zone: UTC+5:30 (IST)
- PIN: 531001
- Vehicle registration: AP 31

Anakapalli mandal is one of the mandals in located in Anakapalli district of the state of Andhra Pradesh, India. It is administered under Anakapalli revenue division and its headquarters are located at Anakapalli. It is bounded by Kasimkota Mandal towards west, Munagapaka Mandal towards South, Paravada Mandal towards East, Achutapuram Mandal towards South.

== Demographics ==
Anakapalli mandal spreads across an area of 161.62 sq km. The total population of Anakapalli Mandal is 100,418 residing in 26,224 Houses, Spread across total 64 villages and 43 panchayats and 1 Census Town. Population of males are 49,627 and females are 50,791. Urban population is 5,001 (excluding Anakapalli town, where as rural population is 95,417. The mandal has Highest rural population in Visakhapatnam district. Population in the age-group 0-6 is 10,879 of which 5,560 are male and 5,319 are female. The literacy rate of Anakapalli mandal is 56.66 with 56,903 literates in the Mandal.

== Towns and villages ==
As of 2011 census, Thummapala is the most populated and Papayya Palem is the least populated settlement in the mandal. The mandal consists of 26 settlements. It includes 1 town and 25 villages. Anakapalli municipality was merged with Greater Visakhapatnam Municipal Corporation.

The settlements in the mandal are listed below:

1. Anakapalle†
2. Allikhanudupalem
3. Bhatlapudi
4. Bowluvada
5. Chintanippula
6. Golagam
7. Gopalapuram
8. Jagannadhapuram
9. Koduru
10. Kondupalem
11. Koppaka
12. Kunchangi
13. Kundram
14. Makavaram
15. Mamidipalem
16. Maredupudi
17. Maredupudi Agraharam
18. Marturu
19. Mettapalem
20. Papayya Palem
21. Papayya Santha Palem
22. Pisinikada
23. Rajupalem
24. Rebaka
25. Sampathipuram
26. Sankaram
27. Seethanagaram
28. Tagarampudi
29. Thummapala
30. Valluru
31. Venkupalem
32. Vetajangalapalem
33. Vooderu

Note: †–Mandal headquarter

== Transport ==
Anakapalli mandal is well connected by road and Rail. National Highway 16 or Asian Highway 45 passes through the mandal. It also has major District roads and State Highways connecting it to nearby mandals and Visakhapatnam. APS RTC runs bus services from Anakapalli bus station to major parts of the state and Visakhapatnam. Anakapalli railway station is on Howrah-Chennai main line. It is under Vijayawada division of South Central railway zone. Almost every Passenger and Express train passes through halts here. The mandal also has Minor railway stations like Thadi. Alluri Sitarama Raju International Airport (VTZ) is the nearest International airport at a distance of 20 km from the mandal.

The following bus routes go to Anakapalli from Visakhapatnam.

== Public transportation ==
APSRTC runs buses to this area along these routes

Route number	Start	End	Via
500	RTC complex	Anakapalli	NAD, Gajuwaka, Kurmannapalem, Aganampudi

== See also ==
- List of mandals in Andhra Pradesh
