= Chintakayala Ayyanna Patrudu =

Indian politician

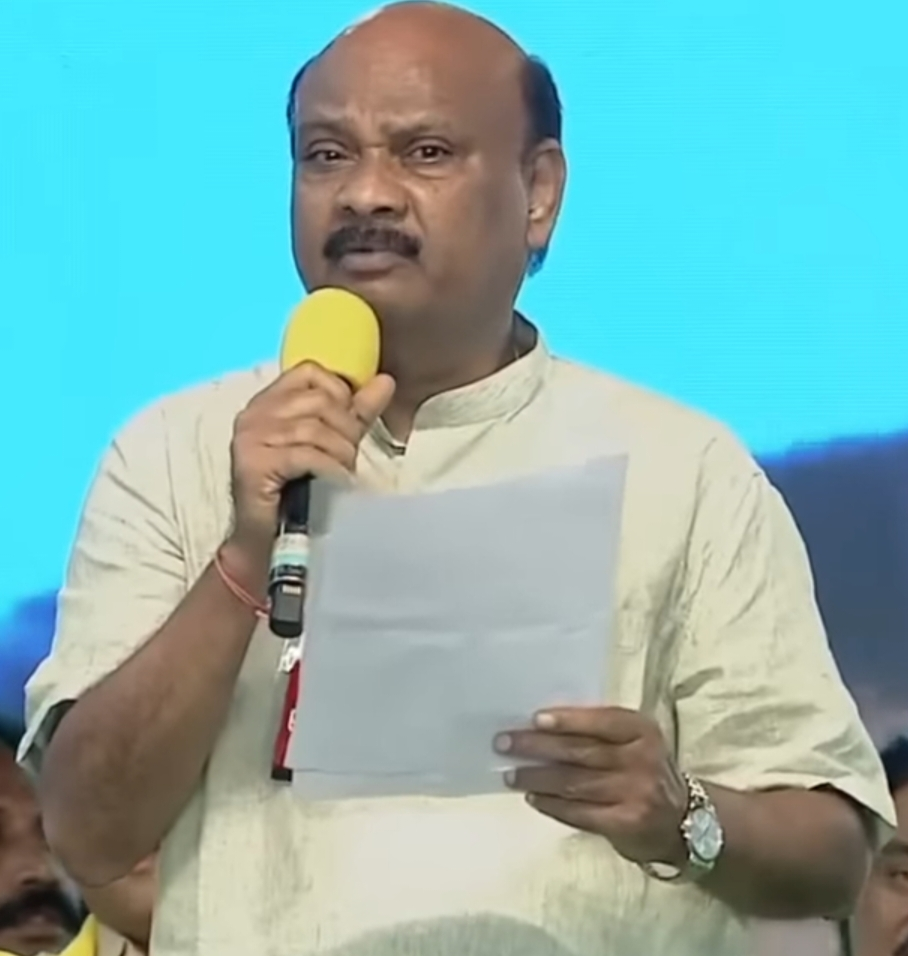
- Ayyanna Patrudu in 2023

Speaker of the Andhra Pradesh Legislative Assembly
- Incumbent
- Assumed office 22 June 2024
- Deputy Speaker: Raghu Rama Krishna Raju (from 14 November)
- Leader of the House: N. Chandrababu Naidu
- Preceded by: Thammineni Seetharam; Gorantla Butchaiah Chowdary (pro tem)

Minister for Roads & Buildings Government of Andhra Pradesh
- In office 2 April 2017 – 29 May 2019
- Governor: E. S. L. Narasimhan
- Chief Minister: N. Chandrababu Naidu
- Preceded by: Sidda Raghava Rao
- Succeeded by: Malagundla Sankaranarayana

Minister of Panchayat Raj, Rural Water Supply, NREGS Government of Andhra Pradesh
- In office 8 June 2014 – 1 April 2017
- Governor: E. S. L. Narasimhan
- Chief Minister: N. Chandrababu Naidu
- Preceded by: President's Rule
- Succeeded by: Nara Lokesh

Minister of Forests, Environment, Science and Technology Government of Andhra Pradesh
- In office 1999–2004
- Governor: C. Rangarajan; Surjit Singh Barnala
- Chief Minister: N. Chandrababu Naidu
- Preceded by: Ponnapureddy Ramasubba Reddy
- Succeeded by: Satrucharla Vijaya Rama Raju

Member of Parliament, Lok Sabha
- In office 1996–1998
- Preceded by: Konathala Ramakrishna
- Succeeded by: Gudivada Gurunadha Rao
- Constituency: Anakapalli

Minister of Roads and Buildings & Ports Government of Andhra Pradesh
- In office 1994–1996
- Governor: Krishan Kant
- Chief Minister: N. T. Rama Rao
- Succeeded by: Nandamuri Harikrishna

Minister of Technical Education Government of Andhra Pradesh
- In office 1984–1986
- Governor: Shankar Dayal Sharma; Kumudben Joshi
- Chief Minister: N. T. Rama Rao
- Preceded by: Pasupati Anandha Gajapathi Raju

Member of the Andhra Pradesh Legislative Assembly
- Incumbent
- Assumed office 4 June 2024
- Preceded by: Petla Uma Sankara Ganesh
- Constituency: Narsipatnam
- In office 2014 - 2019
- Preceded by: Bolem Muthyala Papa
- Succeeded by: Petla Uma Sankara Ganesh
- Constituency: Narsipatnam
- In office 1999 - 2009
- Preceded by: Vechalapu Sri Ramamurthy
- Succeeded by: Bolem Muthyala Papa
- Constituency: Narsipatnam
- In office 1994 - 1996
- Preceded by: Krishnamurthyraju Raja Sagi
- Succeeded by: Vechalapu Sri Ramamurthy
- Constituency: Narsipatnam
- In office 1983 - 1989
- Preceded by: Gopatrudu Bolem
- Succeeded by: Krishnamurthyraju Raja Sagi
- Constituency: Narsipatnam

Personal details
- Born: 4 September 1957 (age 68) Narsipatnam, Anakapalli district, Andhra Pradesh
- Citizenship: Indian
- Party: Telugu Desam Party
- Spouse: Ch. Padmavathi
- Children: 2 (sons)

Chintakayala Ayyanna Patrudu (born 4 September 1957) is an Indian politician from Andhra Pradesh. He is a seven time MLA from Narsipatnam Assembly constituency. He is serving as the current speaker of the Andhra Pradesh Legislative Assembly from 2024. He won the Narsipatnam seat in the 2024 Assembly election.

== Early life and education ==
Patrudu was born in Velama family at Narsipatnam in the erstwhile Visakhapatnam district. He did his bachelor's degree in arts from PR Government College, Kakinada, in 1978.

== Career ==
He started his political journey as a member of Telugu Desam Party and was first elected as an MLA in 1983. He won the 1983 Andhra Pradesh Legislative Assembly election representing Telugu Desam party from Narsipatnam Assembly constituency. He was elected for the second time in 1985 election but lost the next election in 1989 to Krishnamurthyraju Raja Sagi of Indian National Congress.

He regained the seat in 1994 on Telugu Desam Party ticket but lost the by election 1996. However, he won back to back elections in 1999 and 2004. He won for the sixth time and regained the seat in the 2014 Andhra Pradesh Legislative election.

He lost the 2019 election but said that he would contest for a last time and won the 2024 Andhra Pradesh Assembly elections with a majority of over 20,000 votes. He was appointed the Speaker of the Andhra Pradesh Legislative Assembly by Chief Minister Nara Chandrababu Naidu. He is the third speaker in the newly formed Andhra Pradesh state, after Kodela Siva Prasad Rao and Thammineni Seetharam.

In between, he was also elected as a Member of Parliament in 1996 from Anakapalli Lok Sabha constituency. He also served as a Cabinet minister in Government of Andhra Pradesh from 2014 to 2019.
