= Chinateenarla =

Village in Andhra Pradesh, India

Chinateenarla is a village in Nakkapalli block, Anakapalli district, Andhra Pradesh, India, with about 600 households.
