= Upamaka =

Upamaka Upmaka agraharam
- village
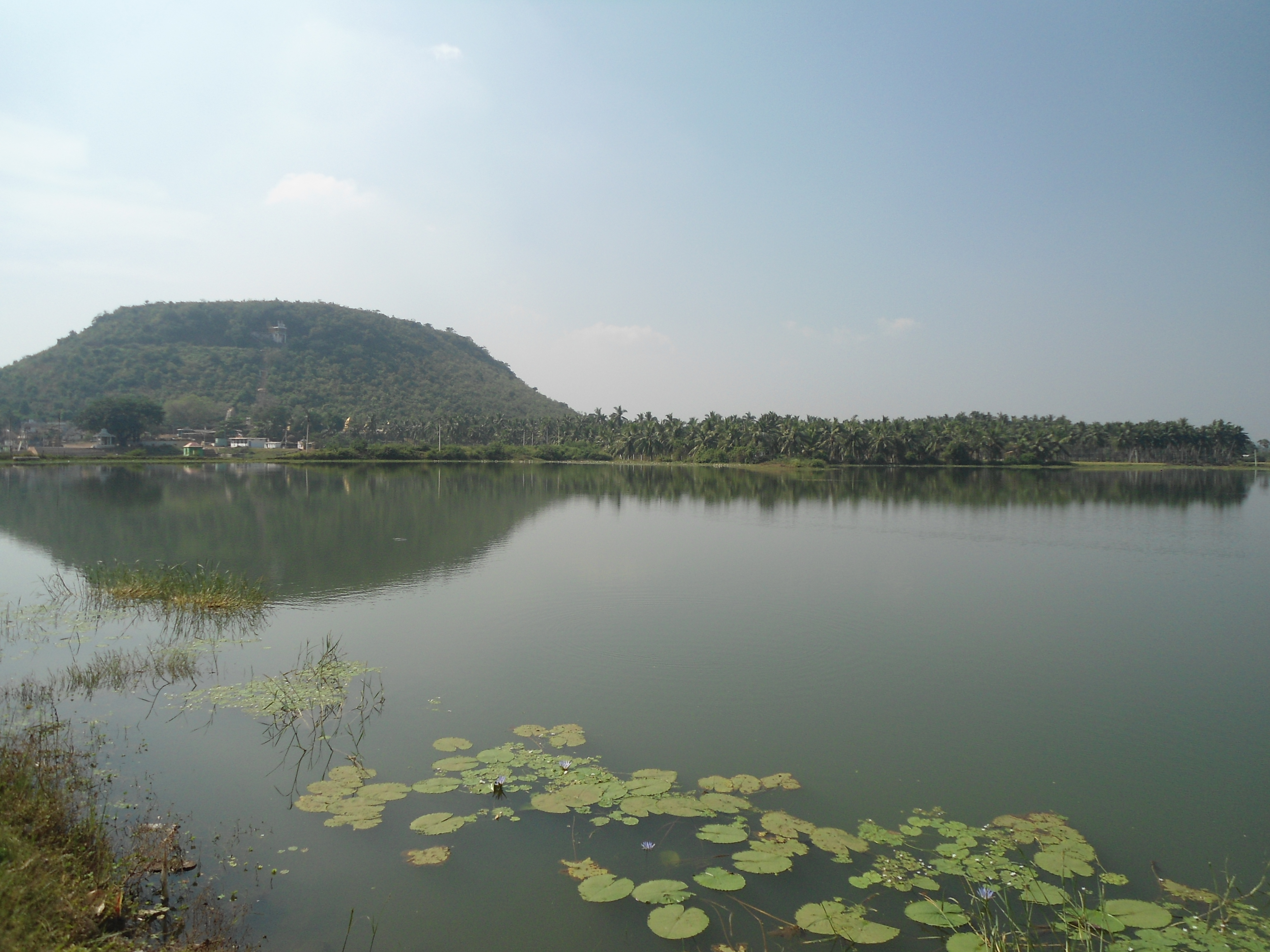
- View of Upamaka cave temple hill near Nakkapalli
- Interactive map of Upamaka
- Location in Andhra Pradesh, India
- Coordinates: 17°23′51″N 82°42′57″E
- Country: India
- State: Andhra Pradesh
- Established: 6th century

Government
  - Body: Upmaka grama Panchayat

Area
  - Total: 6 km^{2} (2.3 sq mi)

Population
  - Total: 3,656
  - Density: 610/km^{2} (1,600/sq mi)

Languages
  - Official: Telugu
- Time zone: UTC+5:30 (IST)
- Website: Www. Upmaka Balaji.com

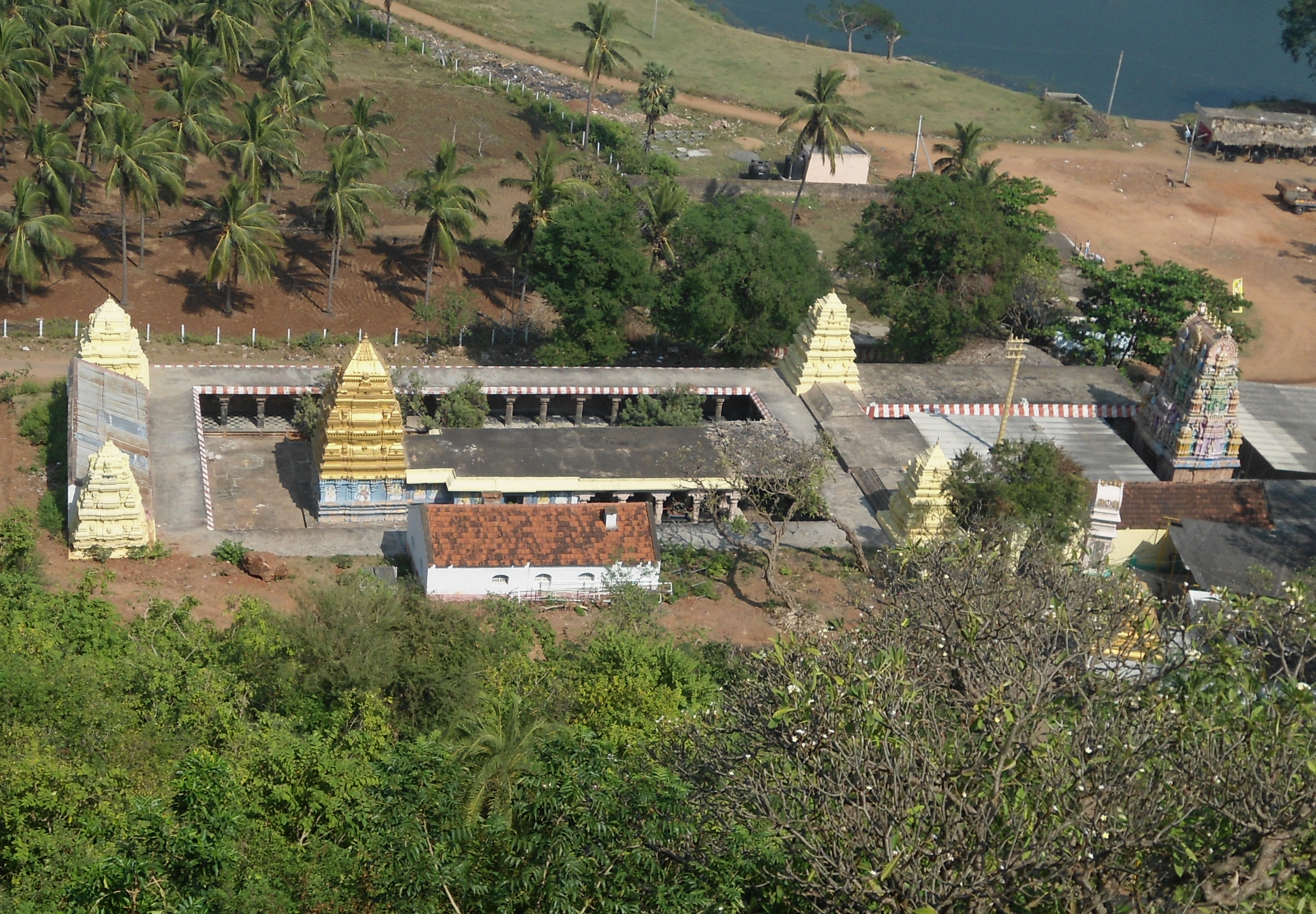
Upamaka Temple view near Nakkapalli

Upamaka is a village in Nakkapalle mandal of Anakapalli district of Andhra Pradesh in India, where an ancient temple of Lord Venkateswara Swamy is present.
