= Narsipatnam revenue division =

Narsipatnam revenue division నర్సీపట్నం ఆదాయ విభాగం
- revenue division in Anakapalli district
- Interactive map of Narsipatnam revenue division
- Country: India
- State: Andhra Pradesh
- District: Anakapalli

Population (2011)
  - Total: 760,465

Narsipatnam revenue division (or Narsipatnam division) is a revenue division in the Anakapalli district of the Indian state of Andhra Pradesh. It is one of the three revenue divisions in the district which consists of twelve mandals under its administration. Narsipatnam is the divisional headquarters.

== History ==
On 3 April 2013, the mandals of Rolugunta and Madugula were transferred to Anakapalle revenue division. As part of district restructure in 2025, few more mandals were transferred.

As of the 2011 census, post the 2022 district restructure, the division had a population of 760,465. Rural population is 652,058 while the urban population is 108,407. Scheduled Castes and Scheduled Tribes make up 11.60% and 2.27% of the population respectively.

Hindus are 98.00% of the population, Muslims are 0.99% and Christians 0.86%.

99.04% of the population spoke Telugu as their first language.

== Administration ==
There are 7 mandals under the administration of Narsipatnam revenue division. They are:

1. Golugonda
2. Madugula
3. Makavarapalem
4. Narsipatnam
5. Nathavaram
6. Ravikamatham
7. Rolugunta

== See also ==
- List of revenue divisions in Andhra Pradesh
- List of mandals in Andhra Pradesh
