= G. Koduru =

G.Koduru
- Village
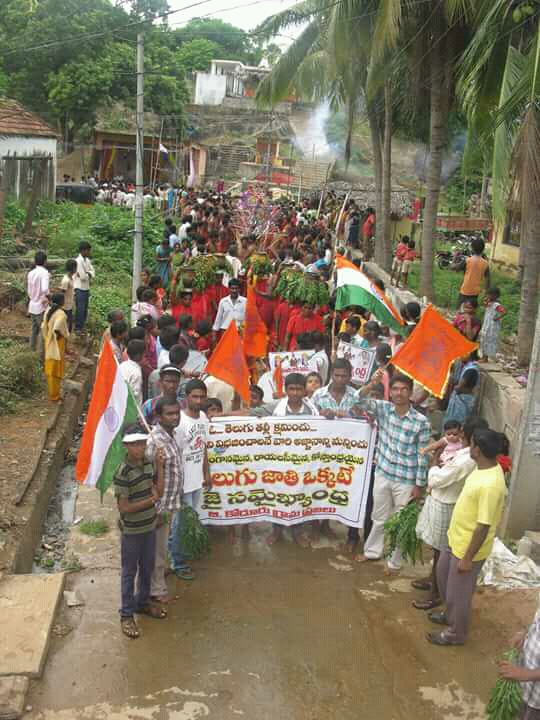
- Interactive map of G.Koduru
- Location within Andhra Pradesh Location within India
- Coordinates: 17.585°N 82.737°E
- Country: India
- State: Andhra Pradesh
- District: Anakapalli
- Elevation: 23 m (75 ft)
- Time zone: UTC+5:30 (IST)
- Telephone code: 08932

G. Koduru is a village in Makaravarapalem mandal, Anakapalli district of the Indian state of Andhra Pradesh.

== Demographics ==
According to the 2011 Indian Census, the village has a population of 1904 with an area of 1,6497 inhabitants covering 1649 hectares. The number of males in the village was 3249 and the number of women was 3348. The number of Scheduled Castes was 706 while the number of Scheduled Tribes was 78. Village Census Area Code 586319. Pin Code: 531113.

No. of House Holds: 721 Total Population: 2159 Total Male Population: 1064 Total Female Population: 1095

== Education ==
The basic elementary schools in the village are five, private primary schools four, the government primary schools and one secondary government school. The nearest child is Makavarapalem. The nearest junior college, Government Arts / Science Degree College, Makavarapalem, and Engineering College Thamram. The nearest medical college and management college are in Visakhapatnam and in polytechnic nursing house. The nearest vocational training is in the school nursery and the university education center is located in Anakapalli and the rehabilitation special school Visakhapatnam.

== Medical facilities ==
=== Public health facilities ===
One of the primary health centers at Kodur is a doctor and two paramedical crib. There are no doctors at a primary health center. One has a paramedical staff.

Veterinary Hospital, 5 to 10 km from the village of Navaratna Are away. The nearest social health center, Mata Infant care center, T. 10 km from the B hospital Are far more than that. Alopati Hospital, Alternate Drug Hospital, Dispensary, Family Welfare Center, 10 km from the village Are far more than that.
