= Narsipatnam Assembly constituency =

Constituency of the Andhra Pradesh Legislative Assembly, India

Coordinates: 17.67°N 82.61°E

Narsipatnam
- Constituency No. 34 for the Andhra Pradesh Legislative Assembly
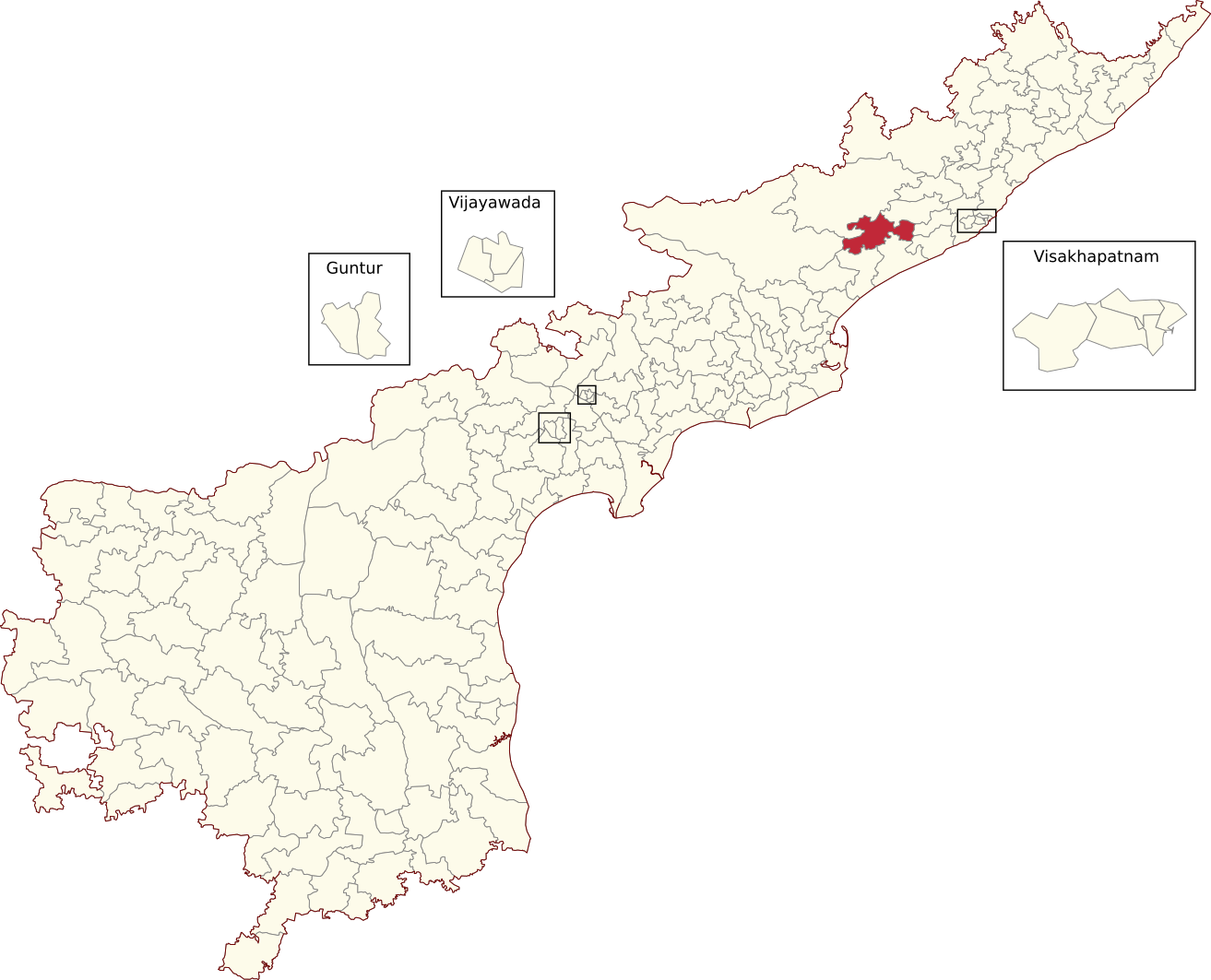
- Location of Narsipatnam Assembly constituency within Andhra Pradesh

Constituency details
- Country: India
- Region: South India
- State: Andhra Pradesh
- District: Anakapalli
- Lok Sabha constituency: Anakapalli
- Established: 1955
- Total electors: 210,275
- Reservation: None

Member of Legislative Assembly
- 16th Andhra Pradesh Legislative Assembly
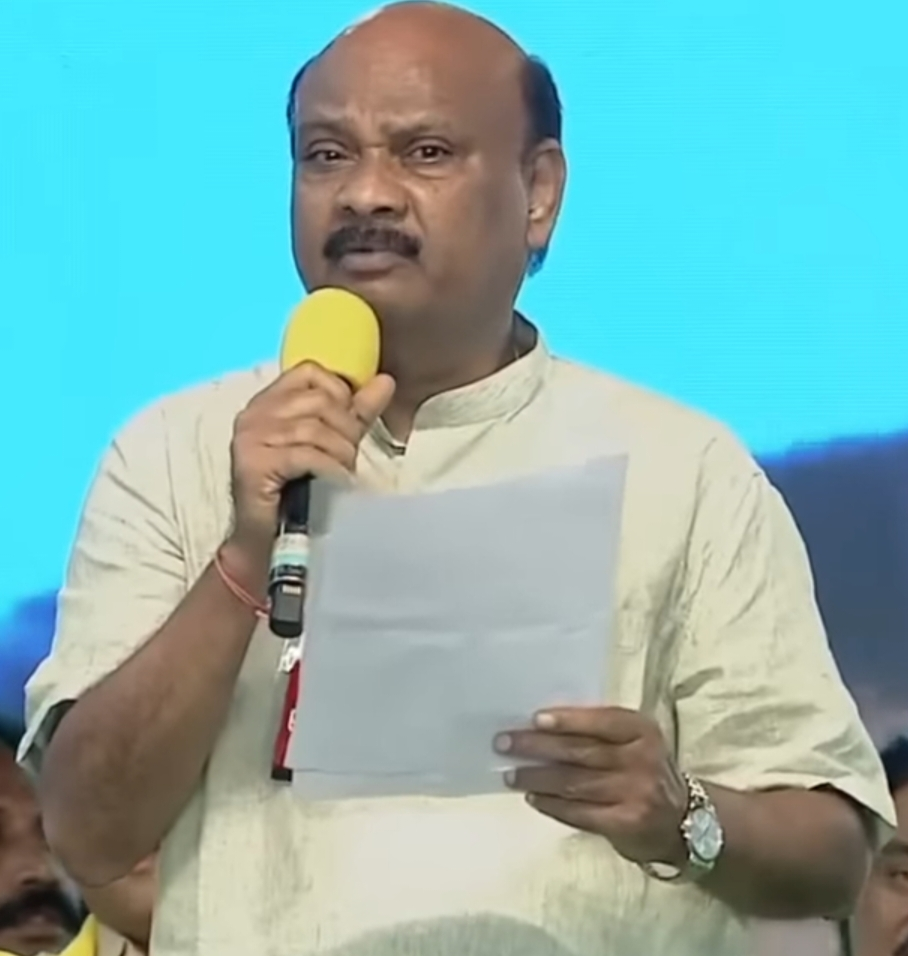
- Incumbent Chintakayala Ayyanna Patrudu
- Party: TDP
- Alliance: NDA
- Elected year: 2024

Narsipatnam Assembly constituency is a constituency in Anakapalli district of Andhra Pradesh that elects representatives to the Andhra Pradesh Legislative Assembly in India. It is one of the seven assembly segments of Anakapalli Lok Sabha constituency.

Chintakayala Ayyanna Patrudu is the current MLA of the constituency, having won the 2024 Andhra Pradesh Legislative Assembly election from Telugu Desam Party. As of 2019, there are a total of 210,275 electors in the constituency. The constituency was established in 1955, as per the Delimitation Orders (1955).

== Mandals ==
The four mandals that form the assembly constituency are:

Mandal
Nathavaram
Golugonda
Narsipatnam
Makavarapalem

== Members of the Legislative Assembly ==
Year	Member	Political party
1955	Mutyala Pothuraju	Indian National Congress
1962	Ruthala Latchapatrudu	Swatantra Party
1967	S. S. Raju	Indian National Congress
1972	Suryanarayana R. S. R. Sagi	Indian National Congress
1978	Gopatrudu Bolem	Indian National Congress
1983	Chintakayala Ayyanna Patrudu	Telugu Desam Party
1985	Chintakayala Ayyanna Patrudu	Telugu Desam Party
1989	Krishnamurthyraju Raja Sagi	Indian National Congress
1994	Chintakayala Ayyanna Patrudu	Telugu Desam Party
1996 by-election	Vechalapu Sri Ramamurthy	Telugu Desam Party
1999	Chintakayala Ayyanna Patrudu	Telugu Desam Party
2004	Chintakayala Ayyanna Patrudu	Telugu Desam Party
2009	Bolem Muthyala Papa	Indian National Congress
2014	Chintakayala Ayyanna Patrudu	Telugu Desam Party
2019	Petla Uma Sankara Ganesh	YSR Congress Party
2024	Chintakayala Ayyanna Patrudu	Telugu Desam Party

== Election results ==
=== 2024 ===
2024 Andhra Pradesh Legislative Assembly election: Narsipatnam
Party	Candidate	Votes	%	±%
TDP	Chintakayala Ayyanna Patrudu	99,849	54.60	
YSRCP	Petla Uma Sankara Ganesh	75,173	41.11	
INC	Ruthala Sriramamurthy	1,088	0.59	
NOTA	None Of The Above	3,824	2.09	
Majority		24,676	13.49	
Turnout		182,866		
TDP hold		Swing		

=== 2019 ===
2019 Andhra Pradesh Legislative Assembly election: Narsipatnam
Party	Candidate	Votes	%	±%
YSRCP	Petla Uma Sankara Ganesh	93,818	54.82	
TDP	Chintakayala Ayyanna Patrudu	70,452	40.41	
Majority		23,366	13.41	
Turnout		174,330	82.9	+0.735
YSRCP gain from TDP		Swing		

=== 2014 ===
2014 Andhra Pradesh Legislative Assembly election: Narsipatnam
Party	Candidate	Votes	%	±%
TDP	Chintakayala Ayyanna Patrudu	79,726	48.86	
YSRCP	Petla Uma Sankara Ganesh	77,388	47.42	
Majority		2,338	1.44	
Turnout		163,181	82.17	+4.85
TDP gain from INC		Swing		

=== 2009 ===
2009 Andhra Pradesh state assembly elections: Narsipatnam
Party	Candidate	Votes	%	±%
INC	Bolem Muthyala Papa	65,465	43.24	
TDP	Ayyanna Patrudu Chintakayala	57,178	37.77	−14.18
PRP	Ruttala Yerrapatrudu	18,917	12.49	
Majority		8,287	5.47	
Turnout		151,401	77.32	+9.42
INC gain from TDP		Swing		

=== 2004 ===
2004 Andhra Pradesh Legislative Assembly election: Narsipatnam
Party	Candidate	Votes	%	±%
TDP	Chintakayala Ayyanna Patrudu	60,689	51.95	+0.32
Independent	Venkata Suryanarayanaraju Datla	36,759	31.47	
INC	Ramachandra Petla	15,453	13.23	−31.02
Majority		23,930	20.48	
Turnout		116,821	76.90	−0.31
TDP hold		Swing		

=== 1999 ===
1999 Andhra Pradesh Legislative Assembly election: Narsipatnam
Party	Candidate	Votes	%	±%
TDP	Chintakayala Ayyanna Patrudu	59,853	51.6	▼2.8
INC	Rajasagi Ramachandra Raju	51,294	44.3	▲0.76
Anna Telugu Desam Party	Ruthala Venkata Ramana	4,776	4.1	
Majority		8,559	7.2	▼3.66
Turnout		118,604	79	▲2.5
TDP hold		Swing		

=== 1996 by-election ===
1996 by-election: Narsipatnam
Party	Candidate	Votes	%	±%
TDP	Krishnamurthyraju Raja Sagi	61,740	54.4	▼3.4
INC	Rajasagi Krishnamurthyraju	49,413	43.54	▲5.34
BSP	Nagulapalli Rama Murthy	1,682	1.48	▲0.28
Independent	Venkataramanamurthy Bolem	442	0.39	
Independent	Geddam Rama Mohananarao	210	0.19	▼0.41
Majority		12,327	10.86	▼8.34
Turnout		115,170	76.5	▼2
TDP hold		Swing		

=== 1994 ===
1994 Andhra Pradesh Legislative Assembly election: Narsipatnam
Party	Candidate	Votes	%	±%
TDP	Chintakayala Ayyanna Patrudu	62,385	57.8	▲14.3
INC	Krishnamurty Sagi	41,206	38.2	▼16.4
BSP	Potireddi Babu Rao	1,282	1.2	
BJP	Setti Sanyasi Babu	976	0.9	
Jharkhand Party	Chintakayala Sreenu	758	0.7	
Independent	Kucharlapati Suryanara Yanaraju	675	1.2	
Independent	Geddam Ramamohanarao	667	0.6	
Majority		21,179	19.2	▲8.6
Turnout		110,252	78.5	0.0
TDP gain from INC		Swing		

=== 1989 ===
1989 Andhra Pradesh Legislative Assembly election: Narsipatnam
Party	Candidate	Votes	%	±%
INC	Krishnamurthyraju Raja Sagi	53,818	54.6	▲5.4
TDP	Chintakayala Apatrudu	42,863	43.5	▼6.6
Independent	Narayanaraju Surya	1,039	1.1	
Independent	Rajana Apparao	925	0.9	
Majority		10,955	10.6	▲9.7
Turnout		103,660	78.5	▼0.9
INC gain from TDP		Swing		

=== 1985 ===
1985 Andhra Pradesh Legislative Assembly election: Narsipatnam
Party	Candidate	Votes	%	±%
TDP	Chintakayala Ayyanna Patrudu	43,218	50.1	▼0.6
INC	Sri Rama Murty Veehalapu	42,407	49.2	▼0.2
Independent	Satti Babu Ruthala	650	0.8	
Majority		811	0.9	▼0.4
Turnout		87,895	79.4	▲3.2
TDP hold		Swing		

=== 1983 ===
1983 Andhra Pradesh Legislative Assembly election: Narsipatnam
Party	Candidate	Votes	%	±%
TDP	Chintakayala Ayyanna Patrudu	38,490	50.7	
INC	Ramchandra Sagi	37,498	49.4	▲43
Majority		992	1.3	▼9.5
Turnout		77,975	76.2	▼6.4
TDP gain from INC		Swing		

=== 1978 ===
1978 Andhra Pradesh Legislative Assembly election: Narsipatnam
Party	Candidate	Votes	%	±%
INC	Gopatrudu Bolem	40,209	52.4	▲14.22
JP	Suryanarayana R. S. R. Sagi	31,649	41.2	▼15.24
INC(I)	Sathibabu Lalam	4,950	6.4	
Majority		8,560	10.8	▼7.46
Turnout		79,420	82.6	▲10.32
INC hold		Swing		

=== 1972 ===
1972 Andhra Pradesh Legislative Assembly election: Narsipatnam
Party	Candidate	Votes	%	±%
INC	Suryanarayana R. S. R. Sagi	33,848	56.44	▼4.13
Independent	Gopairudu Bolem	22,896	38.18	▼0.2
SWA	Satyanarayana Basava	3,227	5.38	▼30.23
Majority		10,952	18.26	▼6.7
Turnout		87,895	79.4	▲3.2
INC hold		Swing		

=== 1967 ===
1967 Andhra Pradesh Legislative Assembly election: Narsipatnam
Party	Candidate	Votes	%	±%
INC	S. S. Raju	36,038	60.57	▲16.58
SWA	R.L. Patrudu	21,190	35.61	▼20.39
Independent	A.L. Rao	2,270	3.82	
Majority		14,848	24.96	▲12.95
Turnout		59,498	82.68	
INC gain from SWA		Swing		

=== 1962 ===
1962 Andhra Pradesh Legislative Assembly election: Narsipatnam
Party	Candidate	Votes	%	±%
SWA	Ruthala Latchapatrudu	22,831	56	
INC	Raja Raju	17,938	43.99	▲22.86
Majority		4,893	12.01	▲12.19
Turnout		40,769		
SWA gain from INC		Swing		

=== 1955 ===
1955 Andhra State Legislative Assembly election: Narasapatnam
Party	Candidate	Votes	%	±%
INC	Raja Raju	23,574	21.13	
INC	Mutyala Pothuraju	21,346	19.13	
CPI	Mande Pitchayya	17,921	16.06	
CPI	Patchipulusu Veerraju	16,532	14.82	
Independent	Killada Ramamurty	15,075	13.51	
Independent	Mutyala Bennayya	7,757	6.95	
Independent	Gara Nookaraju	5,205	4.66	
PSP	Veesetti Krishna Murty	4,172	3.74	
Majority		26,999	24.2	
Turnout		111,592	100	
INC win (new seat)				

== See also ==
- List of constituencies of the Andhra Pradesh Legislative Assembly
