= Narasingapalli railway station =

Railway station in Andhra Pradesh, India

Narasingapalli
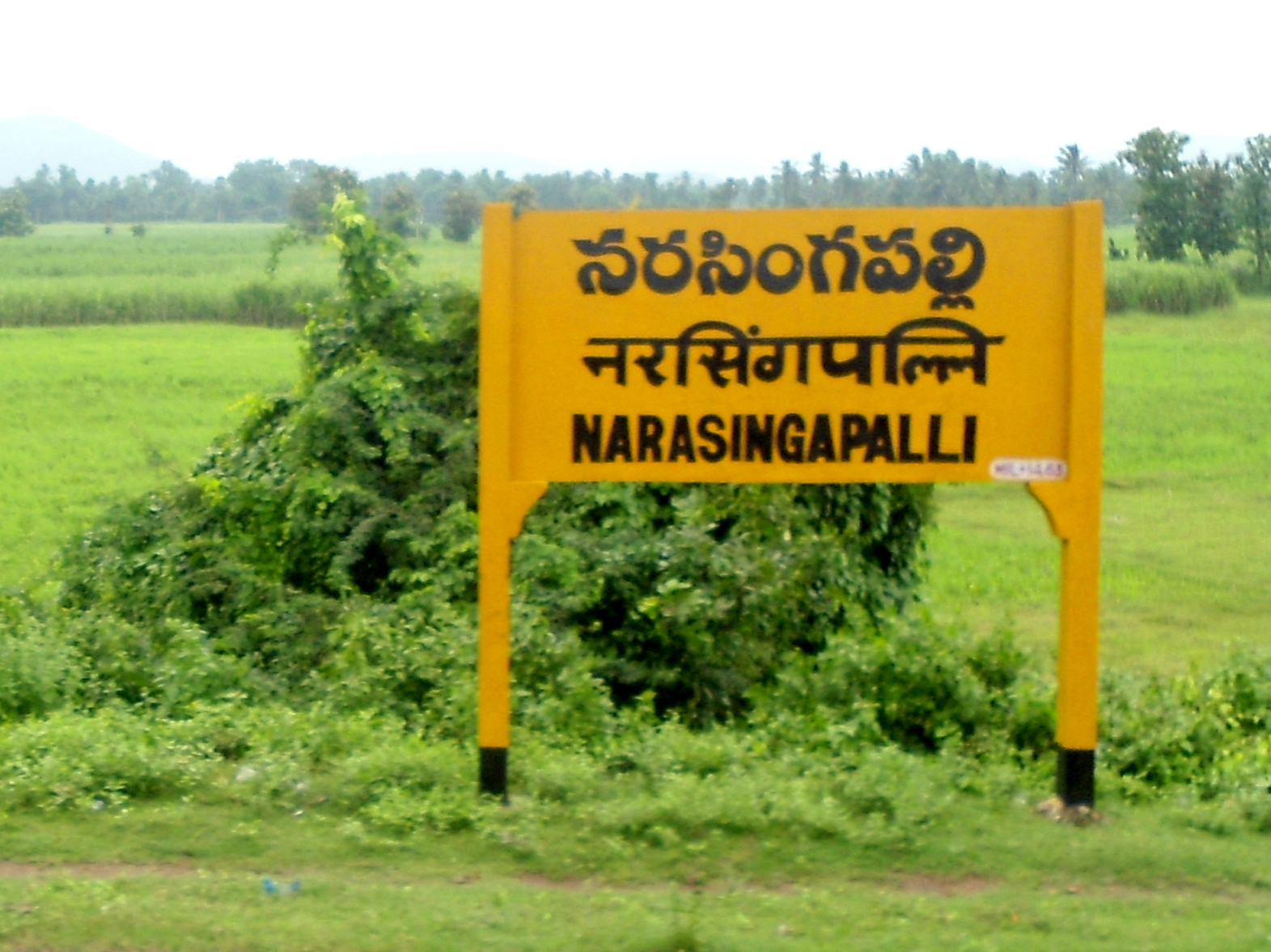

General information
- Location: Narasingapalli, Anakapalli district, Andhra Pradesh; India
- Coordinates: 17°36′21″N 82°53′26″E
- Elevation: 18 m (59 ft)
- System: Express train and Passenger train station
- Owner: Indian Railways
- Operator: South Central Railway zone
- Line: Visakhapatnam–Vijayawada of Howrah–Chennai main line and
- Platforms: 2
- Tracks: 1,676 mm (5 ft 6 in)

Construction
- Structure type: Standard (on ground station)
- Parking: Available

Other information
- Status: Functioning
- Station code: NASP
- Zone(s): South Central Railway zone
- Division(s): Vijayawada

History
- Electrified: 25 kV AC 50 Hz OHLE
Location
- Location within India Location within Andhra Pradesh

Narasingapalli railway station (station code:NASP), is an Indian Railways station in Narasingapalli, a village in Anakapalli district of Andhra Pradesh. It lies on the Vijayawada–Chennai section and is administered under Vijayawada railway division of South Central Railway zone.

== History ==
Between 1893 and 1896, 1,288 km (800 mi) of the East Coast State Railway, between Vijayawada and Cuttack was opened for traffic. The southern part of the East Coast State Railway (from Waltair to Vijayawada) was taken over by Madras Railway in 1901.

== Classification ==
Narasingapalli railway station is categorized as a Non-Suburban Grade-6 (NSG-6) station in the Vijayawada railway division.

Preceding station	Indian Railways	Following station
Kasimkota towards ?	South Central Railway zone Visakhapatnam–Vijayawada of Howrah–Chennai main line	Elamanchili towards ?
