= Kusarlapudi =

- Village
- Interactive map of Kusarlapudi
- Location in Andhra Pradesh, India
- Coordinates: 16.3052°N 80.6182°E
- Country: India
- State: Andhra Pradesh
- District: Anakapalli
- Mandal: Rolugunta

Population (2011)
  - Total: 5,022

Languages
  - Official: Telugu
- Time zone: UTC+5:30 (IST)

Kusarlapudi is a village in Anakapalli district of the Indian state of Andhra Pradesh. It is located in Rolugunta mandal of Narsipatnam revenue division.
