= Pentakota =

- village
- Interactive map of Pentakota
- Location in Andhra Pradesh, India
- Coordinates: 17.3000°N 82.6167°E
- Country: India
- State: Andhra Pradesh
- District: Anakapalli
- Elevation: 0 m (0 ft)

Languages
  - Official: Telugu
- Time zone: UTC+5:30 (IST)
- Climate: hot (Köppen)
- Pentakota Light
- Coordinates: 17.296011°N 82.618250°E
- Constructed: 1957
- Construction: masonry tower
- Height: 18 metres (59 ft)
- Shape: square tower with balcony and lantern
- Markings: white and black bands tower, red lantern dome
- Focal height: 18 metres (59 ft)
- Range: 15 nmi (28 km; 17 mi)
- Characteristic: Fl W 15s.

Pentakota is a village in Payakaraopeta mandal of Anakapalli district, Andhra Pradesh, India.

There is an old lighthouse in the village. It is 18 metres (59 ft) high and was built in 1957. It has a range of 40 kilometres (25 mi).

== Geography ==
Pentakota has an average elevation of 0 metres (0 ft). Pentakota has one side with bay of Bengal. It is present at bank of Thandava river.
