= Payakaraopeta mandal =

- Mandal
- Interactive Map Outlining mandal
- Country: India
- State: Andhra Pradesh
- District: Anakapalli
- Time zone: UTC+5:30 (IST)

Payakaraopeta mandal is one of the 46 mandals in Anakapalli District of Andhra Pradesh. It is part of Adduroad Junction revenue division. As per census 2011, there are 1 town and 18 villages.

== Demographics ==
Payakaraopeta Mandal has total population of 93,093 as per the Census 2011 out of which 46,825 are males while 46,268 are females and the Average Sex Ratio of Payakaraopeta Mandal is 988. The total literacy rate of Payakaraopeta Mandal is 63.18%. The male literacy rate is 60.03% and the female literacy rate is 52.61%.

== Towns and villages ==
=== Towns ===
1. Payakaraopeta

=== villages ===
1. Aratlakota
2. Edatam
3. Gopalapatnam
4. Guntapalle
5. Kandipudi
6. Kesavaram
7. Kumarapuram
8. Mangavaram
9. Masahebpeta
10. Namavaram
11. Padalavani Laskhsmipuram
12. Palteru
13. Pedaramabhadrapuram
14. Pentakota
15. Rajavaram
16. S. Narasapuram
17. Satyavaram
18. Srirampuram
19. palmanpeta

== See also ==
- List of mandals in Andhra Pradesh
