= Bheemavaram, Anakapalli district =

Bheemavarm
- Village
- Interactive map of Bheemavarm
- Location in Andhra Pradesh, India
- Coordinates: 17°27′44″N 82°44′46″E
- Country: India
- State: Andhra Pradesh
- District: Anakapalli district

Population
  - Total: 1,180
- Time zone: UTC+5:30 (IST)

Bheemavarm is a village in S. Rayavaram mandal, Anakapalli district in the state of Andhra Pradesh.

== Administration ==
The village is administrated by a Sarpanch who is an elected representative of village as per constitution of India and Panchayati raj (India).

== Demography ==
Bheemavarm village has 311 houses with a Population of 1,180 which consists of 593 males and 587 females.
