= Medicharla =

Village in Andhra Pradesh, India

Medicharla is a village in Kotapadu Mandal in the Anakapalli district of Andhra Pradesh State, India.
