= Haripalem =

Village located at Andhra Pradesh, India

- Village
- Interactive map of Haripalem
- Location in Andhra Pradesh, India Haripalem (India)
- Coordinates: 17.5881347°N 82.9635978°E
- Country: India
- State: Andhra Pradesh
- District: Anakapalli
- Founder: Kandregula Adinarayana
- Named for: Bhagiradhi Maatha Temple

Population (2011)
  - Total: 3,476

Languages
  - Official: Telugu
- Time zone: UTC+5:30 (IST)
- PIN: 531033
- Telephone code: 08924
- Vehicle registration: AP31
- Nearest city: Vishakhapatnam
- Lok Sabha constituency: Anakapalli
- Vidhan Sabha constituency: Yelamanchili
- Climate: hot (Köppen)

Haripalem is a village and panchayat of Achutapuram mandal, Anakapalli district, Andhra Pradesh, India.
