= Kunchangi =

- Village
- Interactive map of Kunchangi
- Location in Andhra Pradesh, India Kunchangi (India)
- Coordinates: 17.709218°N 82.933228°E
- Country: India
- State: Andhra Pradesh
- District: Anakapalli
- Mandal: Anakapalle mandal

Population (2011)
  - Total: 3,282

Languages
  - Official: Telugu
- Time zone: UTC+05:30 (IST)
- Postal code: 531 001

Kunchangi is a village in Anakapalli district of the Indian state of Andhra Pradesh. It is located in Anakapalle Mandal of Anakapalle revenue division. It is located at a distance of 10km from Anakapalle.

== Demographics ==
As of 2011 Census of India, Kunchangi had a population of 3282. The total population constitute, 1622 males and 1660 females with a sex ratio of 1023 females per 1000 males. 349 children are in the age group of 0–6 years, with child sex ratio of 907 girls per 1000 boys. The average literacy rate stands at 58.85%.
