= Sureddipalem =

Village in Andhra Pradesh, India

Sureddipalem is a village in K.Kotapadu and Sabbavaram Mandal in the Anakapalli district of Andhra Pradesh, India.

The population of Sureddipalem(kotapadu) is 890. Sabbavaram sureddipalem is a village near amruthapuram
