= Thummapala =

- Village
- Interactive map of Thummapala
- Location in Andhra Pradesh, India Thummapala (India)
- Coordinates: 17.716587°N 82.996458°E
- Country: India
- State: Andhra Pradesh
- District: Anakapalli
- Mandal: Anakapalle mandal

Population (2011)
  - Total: 31,035

Languages
  - Official: Telugu
- Time zone: UTC+05:30 (IST)
- Postal code: 531 001

Thummapala is a village in Anakapalli district of the Indian state of Andhra Pradesh. It is located in Anakapalle Mandal of Anakapalle revenue division.

== Demographics ==
As of 2011 Census of India, Thummapala had a population of 31035. The total population constitute, 15245 males and 15790 females with a sex ratio of 1036 females per 1000 males. 3237 children are in the age group of 0–6 years, with child sex ratio of 927 girls per 1000 boys. The average literacy rate stands at 71.28%.
