= Maredupudi =

- Village
- Interactive map of Maredupudi
- Location in Andhra Pradesh, India Maredupudi (India)
- Coordinates: 17°42′05″N 83°04′48″E
- Country: India
- State: Andhra Pradesh
- District: Anakapalli
- Mandal: Anakapalle mandal

Population (2011)
  - Total: 3,416

Languages
  - Official: Telugu
- Time zone: UTC+05:30 (IST)
- Postal code: 531 019

Maredupudi is a village in Anakapalli district of the Indian state of Andhra Pradesh. It is located in Anakapalle Mandal of Anakapalle revenue division.

== Demographics ==
As of 2011 Census of India, Maredupudi had a population of 3416. The total population constitute, 1728 males and 1688 females with a sex ratio of 977 females per 1000 males. 405 children are in the age group of 0–6 years, with child sex ratio of 858 girls per 1000 boys. The average literacy rate stands at 60.08%.
