= Battle of Rajahmundry =

- Part of Vijayanagara-Deccani Conflicts
| Date | 1595 |
| Location | Rajahmundry, Andhra Pradesh, India |
| Result | Kasimkota-Vijayanagar victory |

Belligerents
| Chief of Kasimkota; Supported By : Vijayanagara Empire | Golconda Sultanate |

Commanders and leaders
| Mukund Raj; Venkatapati Raya | Mir Zain-Ul-Abidin; Amir Jumla; Amin-Ul-Mulk; Shankar Raj † |

Strength
| 30,000 Infantry; 3,000 Cavalry | Unknown |

The Battle of Rajahmundry was fought during the reign of Muhammad Quli Qutub Shah. The Golconda army was led by Amir Jumla, Amin-ul-Mulk, against Raja Mukund Raj of Kasimkota. Mukund Raj had gathered a large force and sought support from nearby rulers including the Emperor of Vijaynagara Venkatapati Raya to resist the Golconda army. The two armies met near Rajahmundry where a battle took place. In the fighting Shankar Raj was killed and the Golconda forces suffered heavy losses and were defeated by Mukund Raj.

== Background ==
Bhaybulandur the Raja of the district of Kasimkota had always sent his yearly tribute to the king, but after his death his twelve-year-old son Mukund Raj became the ruler. Muhammad Quli Qutub Shah accepted him as the successor and invited him to the capital where the young Raja was honoured with a robe of office and then sent back to govern his land. Soon after returning Mukund Raj influenced by his relative Vidhyadri killed his own brother Dev Raj and later tried to capture Birlas Khan the king's governor of the region. Trusting the strength of his soldiers and the safety of his forests and hills he also stopped sending the annual tribute. Mukund Raj disobedience left the king with no choice but to interfere at once.

== Battle ==
Muhammad Quli Qutub Shah sent his general, Mir Zain-ul-Abidin, with an army to act against Raja Mukund Raj. When the general reached near Kasimkota he sent a messenger to the Raja asking him to pay the overdue tribute and to promise that it would be paid regularly in the future. However Mir Zain-ul-Abidin found that his force was too small to compel obedience. Realizing this he sent a message to the court requesting more reinforcements.

The king at once ordered Amir Jumla, Amin-ul-Mulk to join the earlier force with more troops and to take full command of the army. He was accompanied by Shankar Raj, the nephew of the late Bhaybulandur. Seeing these serious preparations Mukund Raj became frightened and asked nearby Rajas for help. He also wrote to Venkatapati Raya of Vijayanagara Empire, urging him to send troops to Kandbir while he himself advanced with thirty thousand infantry and three thousand cavalry to face the Golconda’s army near Rajahmundry. A fierce battle followed, and although Shankar Raj was killed in the fighting the Golconda forces were defeated and lost many brave officers and soldiers.

== Aftermath ==
After reaching Kasimkota Mukund Raj killed Birlas Khan and Ghuzunfur Beg along with several other Muhammadans. He had called them to meet him by deceit and then put them to death.

== See also ==
- Mukunda Deva
- Venkatapati Raya
- Golconda Sultanate
