= Marturu =

- Village
- Interactive map of Marturu
- Location in Andhra Pradesh, India Marturu (India)
- Coordinates: 17.732308°N 83.016136°E
- Country: India
- State: Andhra Pradesh
- District: Anakapalli
- Mandal: Anakapalle mandal

Population (2011)
  - Total: 3,023

Languages
  - Official: Telugu
- Time zone: UTC+05:30 (IST)
- Postal code: 531 032

Marturu is a village in Anakapalli district of the Indian state of Andhra Pradesh. It is located in Anakapalle Mandal of Anakapalle revenue division.

== Demographics ==
As of 2011 Census of India, Thummapala had a population of 3023. The total population constitute, 1537 males and 1486 females with a sex ratio of 967 females per 1000 males. 280 children are in the age group of 0–6 years, with child sex ratio of 795 girls per 1000 boys. The average literacy rate stands at 63.32% (male: 73.21%, female: 53.30%).
