= Bowluvada =

- Census town
- Location in Andhra Pradesh, India Bowluvada (India)
- Coordinates: 17.6913°N 83.0039°E
- Country: India
- State: Andhra Pradesh
- District: Anakapalli

Languages
  - Official: Telugu
- Time zone: UTC+5:30 (IST)
- PIN: 531032
- Vehicle registration: AP
- Vidhan Sabha constituency: Anakapalle
- Lok Sabha constituency: Anakapalli

Bowluvada (Telugu: బౌలువాడ, Telugu pronunciation: [bawluwaːɖa]) is a census town in Anakapalli mandal of Anakapalli district in the Indian state of Andhra Pradesh. It lies 27 km west of Visakhapatnam.

The total population in Bowluvada is 5001 according to 2011 Census of India. Among them males are 2427 and females are 2574.
