= Kasimkota railway station =

Railway station in Andhra Pradesh, India

Kasimkota
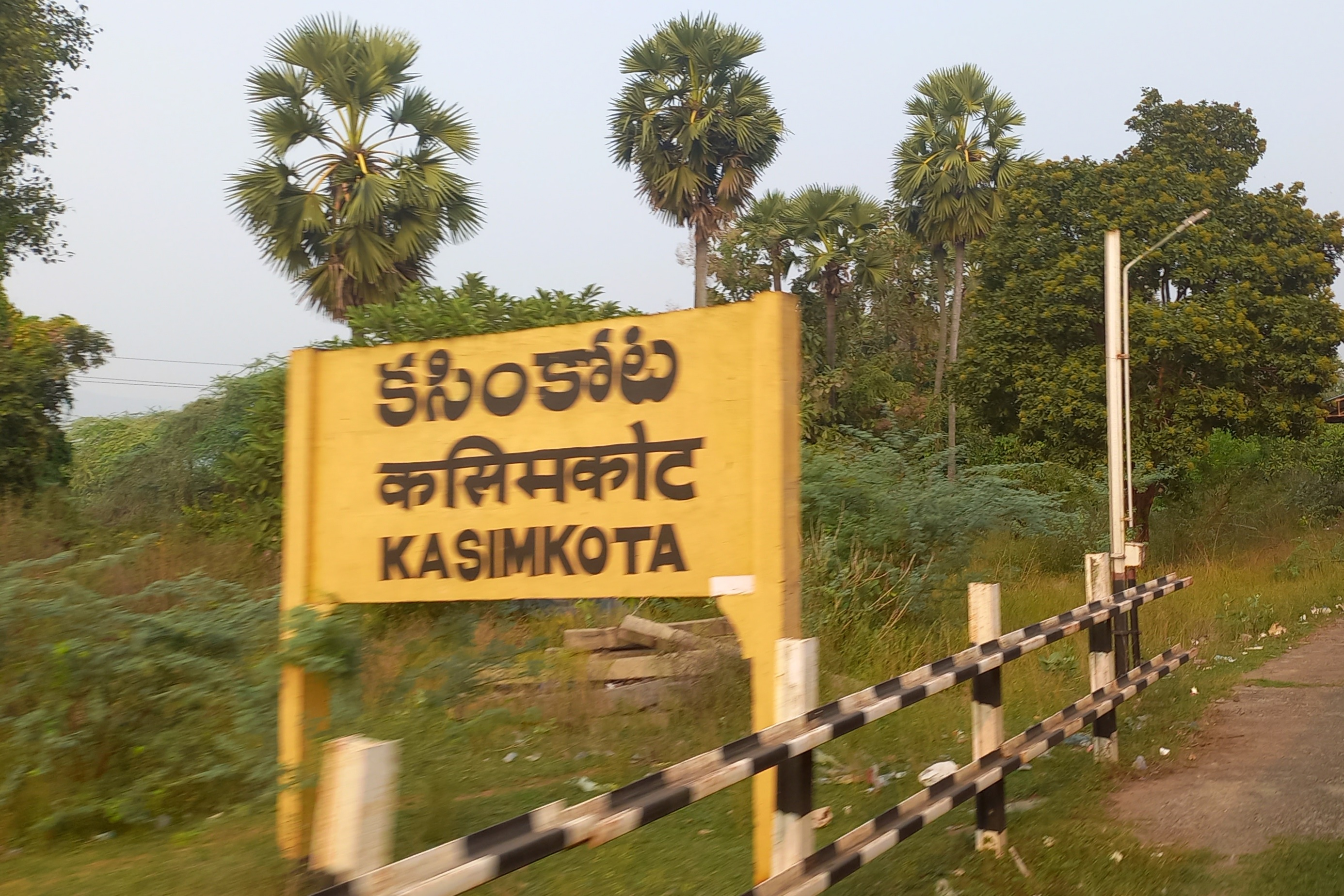

General information
- Location: Kasimkota, Anakapalli district, Andhra Pradesh; India
- Coordinates: 17°40′24″N 82°57′50″E
- Elevation: 36 m (118 ft)
- System: Express train and Passenger train station
- Owner: Indian Railways
- Operator: South Central Railway zone
- Line: Visakhapatnam–Vijayawada of Howrah–Chennai main line and
- Platforms: 2
- Tracks: 1,676 mm (5 ft 6 in)

Construction
- Structure type: Standard (on-ground station)
- Parking: Available

Other information
- Status: Functioning
- Station code: KSK
- Zone(s): South Central Railway zone
- Division(s): Vijayawada

History
- Electrified: 25 kV AC 50 Hz OHLE
Location
- Location within India Location within Andhra Pradesh

Kasimkota railway station (station code:KSK) is an Indian Railways station near Anakapalle, a neighbourhood of Anakapalli district in Andhra Pradesh. It lies on the Vijayawada–Chennai section and is administered under Vijayawada railway division of South Central Railway zone.

== History ==
Between 1893 and 1896, 1,288 km (800 mi) of the East Coast State Railway, between Vijayawada and Cuttack was opened for traffic. The southern part of the East Coast State Railway (from Waltair to Vijayawada) was taken over by Madras Railway in 1901.

== Classification ==
Kasimkota railway station is a D–category station of Vijayawada division.

Preceding station	Indian Railways	Following station
Anakapalle towards ?	South Central Railway zone Visakhapatnam–Vijayawada of Howrah–Chennai main line	Narasingapalli towards ?
