= Rolugunta =

Coordinates: 17°43′N 82°40′E

- Village
- Interactive map of Rolugunta
- Location in Andhra Pradesh, India
- Country: India
- State: Andhra Pradesh
- District: Anakapalli

Population
  - Total: 15,000

Languages
  - Official: Telugu
- Time zone: UTC+5:30 (IST)
- PIN: 531114
- Vehicle Registration: AP31 (Former); AP39 (from 30 January 2019)

Rolugunta is a village in Anakapalli district in the state of Andhra Pradesh in India.
