= Sankaram =

Protected Buddhist monument in Andhra Pradesh, India

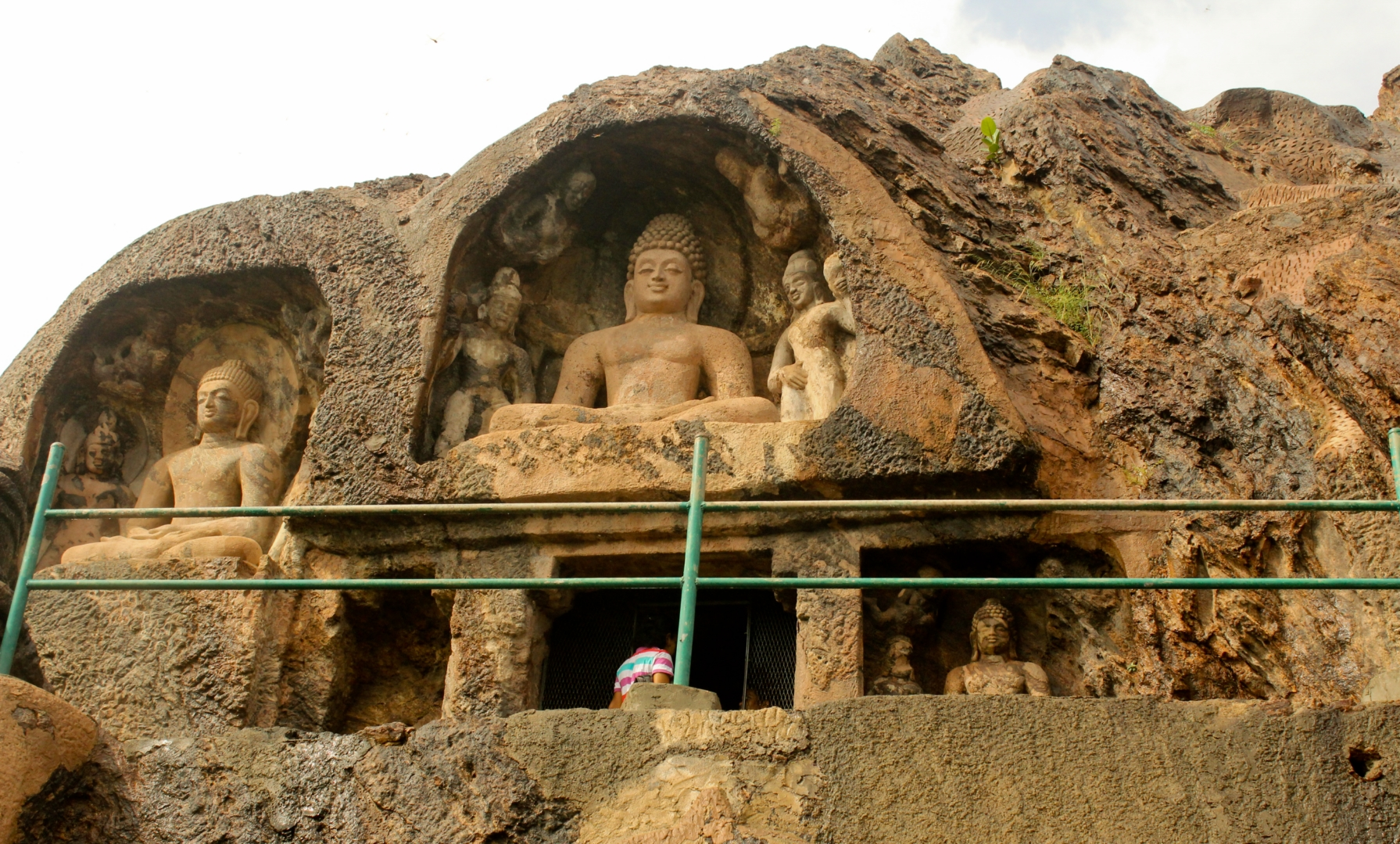
View of the site

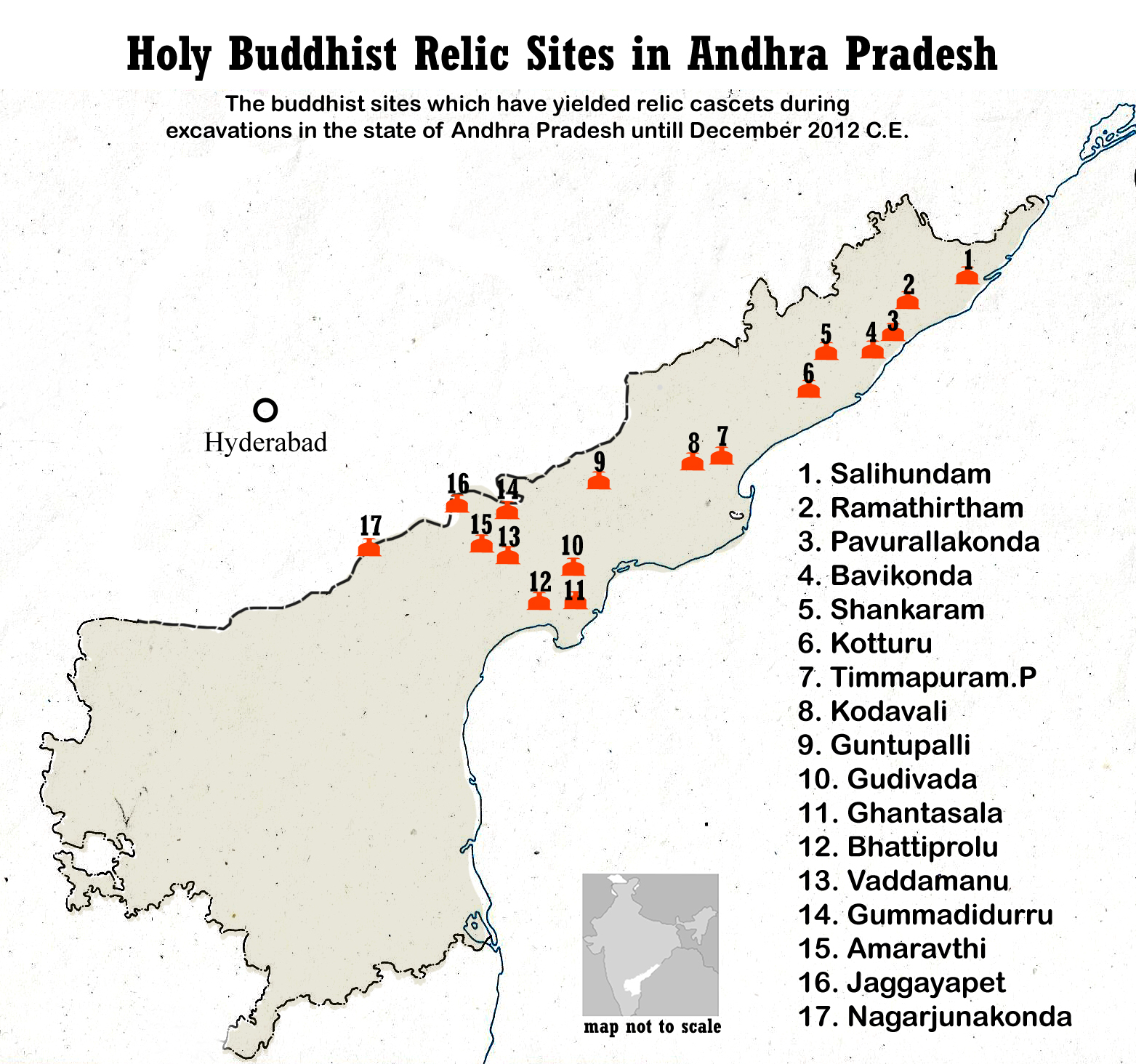
Bojjannakonda is considered by Buddhists to be one of the holy relic sites of Andhra Pradesh

Sankaram is the name given to an archaeological site located near the village of Sankaram, which is the headquarters of Anakapalli district in the Indian state of Andhra Pradesh. It is one of many notable historic Buddhist sites in the Visakhapatnam area, along with others such as Bavikonda, Pavurallakonda, and Thotlakonda. The site is administered by the Archaeological Survey of India (ASI).

Bojjannakonda and Lingalametta (or Lingalakonda) are adjacent hillocks situated near the village of Sankaram which both house rock-cut caves of Buddhist origin. The sites are believed to have been established when Buddhism was the majority religion of Sankaram. It is noted for being one of the longest-occupied Buddhist sites in Andhra, and features all three historical forms of Buddhism: Theravada, Mahayana and Vajrayana.

== Sankaram village ==
The archaeological site is named for Sankaram, a village situated three kilometres to the east of Anakapalli in the Anakapalli district of Andhra Pradesh. The village has a population of about 3000 and is primarily a commuter town for Anakapalli. Its main crop are rice paddies.

Following the formation of the new Anakapalli district in 2022, Sankaram village was chosen as the new headquarters for the district. Work began on constructing the administrative buildings in 2024.

== Archaeological site ==
A short distance to the north of the village are two hills surrounded by paddy fields. The eastern hill is called Bojjannakonda and the western one is called Lingalametta or Lingalakonda. The hills contain monolithic stupas, rock-cut caves, chaityas and monasteries forming one of the most remarkable Buddhist establishments in Andhra Pradesh during the period.

According to Debala Mitra, later the Director General of the Archaeological Survey of India:

Though the establishment had an early nucleus, its most flourishing period was the third and fourth centuries A.D. It continued its existence up to at least ninth century A.D., if not later, but it is little affected by the Vajrayāna form of Buddhism. The only detachable image found so far is that of Hāritī. The occurrence of two reliefs, one of Gaṇeṡa and the other of a terrible form of Śiva, on the façade of one of the caves proves the appropriation of the site by the Śaivas.

=== Etymology ===
The name of the village Sankaram is understood to be a corruption of Sangharam. Archaeologist K. Chitti Babu describes the site as being similar to Takṣaśilā and relates the name Sankaram to Sangrama, which he attributes to Buddhist influence as the word was not used in Andhra Pradesh.

In his initial description of the site Alexander Rea refers to it as Śaṅkaram and the eastern hill (and the hills collectively) as Bojaṅṅakoṇda. He additionally notes that the western hill is named for its many monoliths, being known as liṅgala mitta or kōḷiliṅgam; he translates the latter as "lull of the crore of the liṅgams". Debala Mitra states Lingalakonda as meaning "the hill of liṅgas".

K. R. Subramanian calls the site Sanghārāma and refers to the hills interchangeably as Lingālakoṇda and Bojjanakoṇda. He claims that the latter name is a corruption of Buddhannakoṇda. Similarly, G. Babulu of the Maha Bodhi Society claims the name was originally Buddhuni konda, meaning "hill of the Buddha".

K. Chitti Babu ascribes the name as coming from the Telugu word bojja, meaning "tummy", owing to a misidentification of one the Buddha figures as Ganesh.

=== Excavation ===
The site was excavated under the aegis of Scottish archaeologist Alexander Rea, who presented his findings in the Archaeological Survey of India's 1907-08 Annual Report. Prior to excavation most of the stupas adorning the eastern hill were buried by the earth, with only a few of the larger ones being visibly present on the hill's surface. The residential buildings to the east of the central stupa were also entirely covered by loose bricks and a large amount of earth, giving few indications as to their presence; Rea was unable to offer a satisfactory explanation for this accumulation.

Rea noted that the eastern hill was considered the more significant site, and that the hills were collectively referred to by its name. He noted the site to be older than the Seven Pagodas, and contain some of the earliest Buddhist monuments in southern India. He suggested that the site may date to before the 1st century CE and that the earliest parts may be contemporary with Ashoka, offering his belief that the site was among those that had been founded by him.

Between the hills is a figure of the goddess Hariti, who Rea identifies as "Palakamma Devi", a local goddess. He noted that at the time of his excavation the statue was almost entirely covered in stones.

Rea reported finding approximately 70 coins, mostly copper, with one gold and one lead; this was notably different to the coins found at Amaravati, which were almost all lead. The gold coin bears the image of the 4th century Emperor Samudragupta, which V. Venkayya noted to be unusually far south for such a find. Copper coins found at the site were tentatively identified by Walter Elliot as being from the Pallava dynasty. According to John Faithfull Fleet some of these coins bore markings pertaining to Kubja Vishnuvardhana, the first king of the Eastern Chalukyas; Venkayya suggests that these may have been altered by the Pallavas for continued circulation. A further copper coin dated to the 4th-5th century and bearing the word "Śrikaṁsa" remained unidentified.

Mitra indicates that the slope where most of the antiquities were found was used as dump.

Rea states that the monastery would have originally been situated on the bank of the Sarada River prior to its course changing.

=== Bojjannakonda ===
The hill is covered in rocky outcrops. The larger outcrops have been carved into stupas, creating an irregular distribution of monuments about the hill. Rea suggests these were cut in honour of donors.

The primary feature of the site is a large central stupa atop a platform, which Mitra terms the "Main Stūpa". She describes it as "definitely post-Christian" and dates it as potentially as late as the 3rd century AD. The stupa was primarily fashioned from rock, with incomplete parts of the rock filled with brick.

Nine brick stupas line the southern edge of the platform of the central stupa, all of which are missing their domes. These lie alongside the foundations of a rectangular building.

There is another brick stupa to the east of the platform, accompanied by a miniature chaitya to the south of the platform. The structures would have been covered in plaster, though only traces of this remain.

To the east of the Main Stupa is a residential complex, which Rea considered unique in form.

=== Lingalametta ===
In his initial description, Rea noted that the hill contained more than two hundred lingas.

=== Hariti figure ===
Sited between the two hills in a narrow passage is a statue of Hariti. The historian and archaeologist Sree Padma Holt notes the popularity of the goddess in the region and suggests this was a form of religious syncretism. Archaeologist and art historian K. Krishna Murthy confirms the identification of the figure as Hariti rather than the local goddess Palakamma, and dates it to the 4th century CE on stylistic grounds. Holt further notes that the presence of the Hariti figure is indicative of the transition to Mahayana Buddhism.

== Conservation ==
By the 1920s, work at the site had shifted focus towards conservation. In the 1923-24 Annual Report, A.H. Longhurst states:

The conservation of the Buddhist remains situated on the Bojjanakonda hill near Anakapaili railway station in the Vizagapatam District was carried out at very little cost. The work consisted mainly of grouting, pointing and plastering, removal of vegetation and the rebuilding of the watchman’s shed which was damaged by the severe cyclone that visited this district during the year under report.

The Indian National Trust for Arts and Cultural Heritage (INTACH) noted that Kanuma celebrations have damaged the site. It has called on local authorities to provide protection during the event, as well as encouraging its members to visit during the festivities to help preserve the site.

== Tourism ==
The Indian government allocated ₹7.30 crore (approx. $822,000 USD) for development at the site, including establishing a meditation centre. In 2023 the Archaeological Survey of India additionally proposed the construction of amenities estimated to cost ₹32 lakh (approx. $38,700 USD). Tourism to the site had led to the construction of a road in the nearby village.

In 2023 the District Tourism Officer Korada Ashok stated that an average of 5000-8000 people visit the site each month, and that major festivals like Sivarathri draw visitors from nearby villages. International tourism to the site is significantly associated with countries with large Buddhist populations.

== Religious and cultural observances ==
A number of religious and cultural observances are held at the site. Most notable are the Kanuma celebrations (locally known as Theertham), during which there is a tradition of throwing stones at the figure of Hariti, which is considered to be a demon. Rea also describes the custom of local women throwing stones at the statue, and indicates that it is not solely confined to the festival. He suggests that this practice originates from the desecration of the site by Hindus following the expulsion of Buddhists.

Other observances include Sivarathri, Buddha Purnima, and Karteeka Masam.

In 2023 construction of a meditation centre near the site began.
