= Peda Boddepalle =

- Census town
- Location in Andhra Pradesh, India Peda Boddepalle (India)
- Coordinates: 17.6719514°N 82.3695988°E
- Country: India
- State: Andhra Pradesh
- District: Anakapalli
- Mandal: Narsipatnam
  - Rank: 1

Languages
  - Official: Telugu
- Time zone: UTC+5:30 (IST)
- PIN: 531116
- Vehicle registration: AP
- Vidhan Sabha constituency: Narsipatnam
- Lok Sabha constituency: Anakapalli

Peda Boddepalle is a census town in Narsipatnam mandal of Anakapalli district in the Indian state of Andhra Pradesh. It lies 75 km towards west of Visakhapatnam. The total population of Peda Boddepalle is 12781 according to 2011 Census of India; 6464 male and 6317 female.
