= Adduroad Junction revenue division =

Revenue division in Andhra Pradesh, India

Adduroad Junction revenue division అడ్డరోడ్డు జంక్షన్ ఆదాయ విభాగం
- revenue division in Anakapalli district
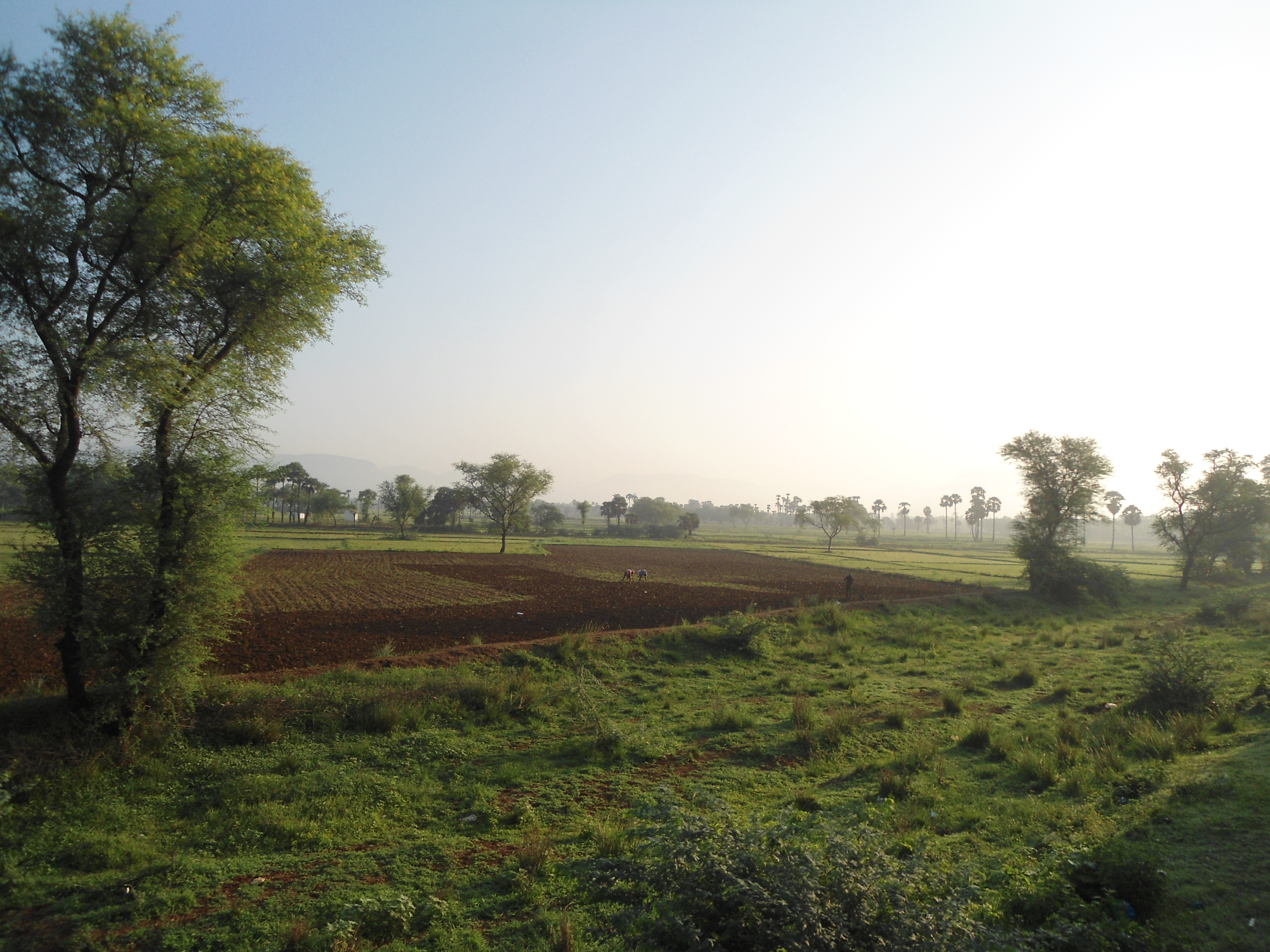
- Fields near Elamanchili
- Adduroad Junction revenue division in Anakapalli district
- Country: India
- State: Andhra Pradesh
- District: Anakapalli
- Headquarters: Thimmapuram,S.Rayavaram mandal
- Formed: 31 December 2025
- Founder: Government of Andhra Pradesh
- Time zone: UTC+05:30 (IST)

Adduroad Junction revenue division is an administrative division in the Anakapalli district of the Indian state of Andhra Pradesh. It is one of the three revenue divisions in the district and comprises seven mandals. The division was formed on 31 December 2025 as part of the district consolidation and administrative reorganisation undertaken by the Government of Andhra Pradesh during the 2025 restructuring of districts.

The revenue division comprises seven mandals:

1. Atchutapuram
2. Elamanchili
3. Kotauratla
4. Nakkapalli
5. Payakaraopeta
6. Rambilli
7. S. Rayavaram

== See also ==
- List of revenue divisions in Andhra Pradesh
- List of mandals in Andhra Pradesh
