= Petla Uma Sankara Ganesh =

Indian politician

Member of Legislative Assembly Andhra Pradesh
- In office 23 May 2019 – 21 June 2024
- Constituency: Narsipatnam

Personal details
- Party: YSR Congress Party
- Relatives: Petla Puri Jagannadh (brother); Sairam Shankar (brother)
- Occupation: Politician

Petla Uma Sankara Ganesh is an Indian politician from the YSR Congress Party. He is a former Member of the Andhra Pradesh Legislative Assembly from Narsipatnam constituency for 2019.

== Biography ==
Uma Sankara Ganesh was born in a Telugu-speaking Koppula Velama family in Narsipatnam, Visakhapatnam district of Andhra Pradesh. His native village is Bapiraju Kothapalli, Kotauratla Mandal in Visakhapatnam District. He studied at St. Theresa R.C.M. high school in Pedaboddepalli. He is the brother of Telugu film director Puri Jagannadh.
