= K. Kotapadu mandal =

Kintada Kotapadu mandal K. Kotapadu mandal
- Village
- Interactive map of Kintada Kotapadu mandal
- Location in Andhra Pradesh, India Kintada Kotapadu mandal (India)
- Coordinates: 17.8861163°N 83.0435215°E
- Country: India
- State: Andhra Pradesh
- District: Anakapalli

Languages
  - Official: Telugu
- Time zone: UTC+5:30 (IST)
- PIN: 531034
- Vehicle Registration: AP31 (Former); AP39 (from 30 January 2019)

Kintada Kotapadu mandal, commonly known as K. Kotapadu mandal is in Anakapalli district in the state of Andhra Pradesh in India. Its headquarters is at Kintada Kotapadu.

== Villages ==
1. Varada
2. Pothanavalasa
3. Ugginavalasa
4. Ramayogi Agraharam
5. K. Jagannadhapuram
6. Gavarapalem
7. Koruvada
8. Deekshitula Agraharam
9. Pindrangi
10. Srungavaram
11. Gotlam
12. Pathavalasa
13. Marri Valasa
14. Dali Valasa
15. Singannaddorapalem
16. Sureddipalem
17. Alamandakoduru
18. Alamanda Bheemavaram
19. Medicherla
20. Kintada Kotapadu
21. Kintada
22. Ksanthapalem
23. Kavi. Kondala Agraharam
24. Sudicalasa
25. Chendrayyapeta
26. Arle
27. Gondupalem
28. Paidampeta
29. Rongalinaidupalem
30. Gullepalle
31. Chowduvada
32. Garugubilli

== Notable people ==
- Tekumalla Achyutarao (18 April 1880 – 12 February 1947) was one of a major critics in Telugu language was a famous person in this village. He is known for his English work "Pingali Suranarya"(Pingali Suranna, his life and works).
