= Nathavaram =

- Village
- Interactive map of Nathavaram
- Location in Andhra Pradesh, India
- Country: India
- State: Andhra Pradesh
- District: Anakapalli

Languages
  - Official: Telugu
- Time zone: UTC+5:30 (IST)
- Postal code: 531115
- Vehicle Registration: AP31 (Former); AP39 (from 30 January 2019)

Nathavaram is a village in Nathavaram mandal, Anakapalli district in the state of Andhra Pradesh in India. One of the oldest temples in Nathavaram is Ram Mandir.
