= Narasingapalli =

Narasingapalli Narasingibilly
- Village
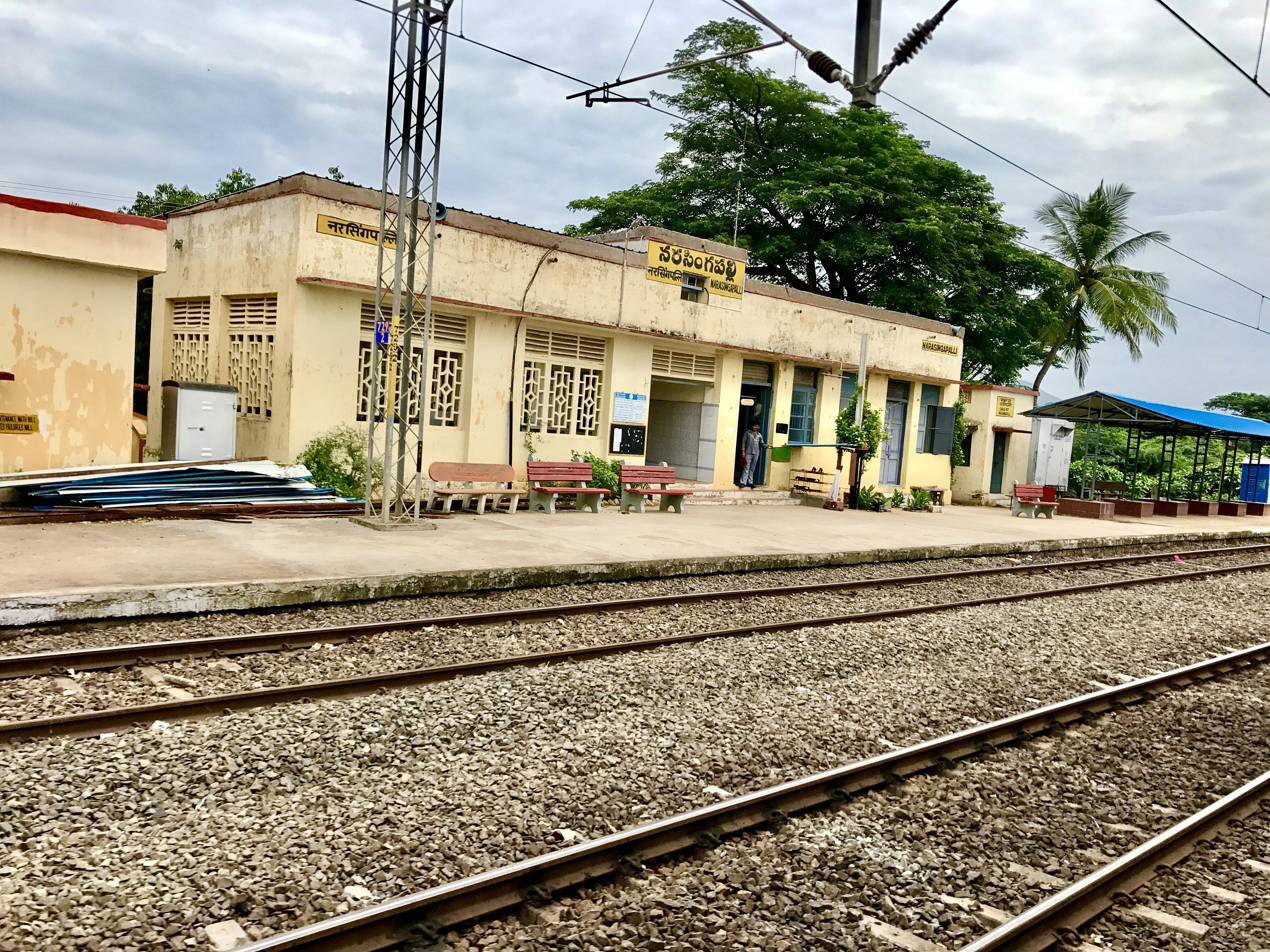
- Narasingapalli railway station
- Interactive map of Narasingapalli
- Location in Andhra Pradesh, India Narasingapalli (India)
- Coordinates: 17.607886°N 82.877036°E
- Country: India
- State: Andhra Pradesh
- District: Anakapalli

Area
  - Total: 9.06 km^{2} (3.50 sq mi)

Population (2011)
  - Total: 1,629
  - Density: 180/km^{2} (466/sq mi)

Languages
  - Official: Telugu
- Time zone: UTC+5:30 (IST)
- PIN: 531055
- Telephone code: 08924
- Vehicle registration: AP30/31/32

Narasingapalli (or Narasingibilly) is a village in Anakapalli district of the Indian state of Andhra Pradesh. It is situated in Kasimkota mandal of Anakapalli revenue division .

== Geography ==
Narasingapalli is located at 17.607886°N 82.877036°E. The village is spread over an area of 9.06 km^{2} (3.50 sq mi). It is located near Visakhapatnam at a distance of 60 km (37 mi).

== Demographics ==
As of 2011 census, Narasingapalli had a population of 1,629. The total population constitute, 786 males and 843 females —a sex ratio of 1073 females per 1000 males. 195 children are in the age group of 0–6 years, of which 99 are boys and 96 are girls. The average literacy rate stands at 53.35% with 765 literates, significantly lower than the state average of 67.41%.

== Transport ==
Narasingapalli railway station provides rail connectivity to the village.
