= Payakaraopeta =

- City
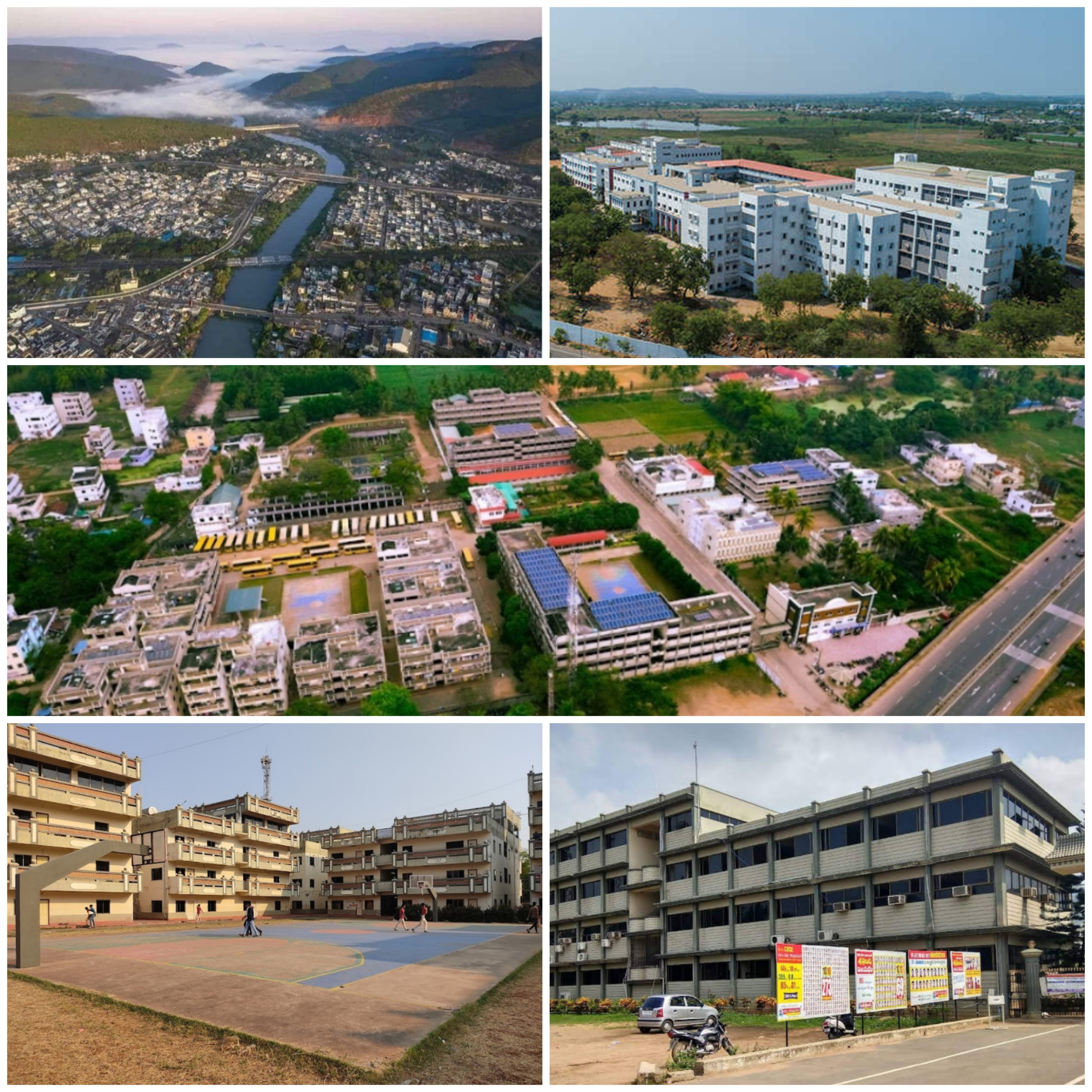
- Payakaraopeta City
- Nickname: Gate Way of Visakhapatnam
- Interactive map of Payakaraopeta
- Coordinates: 17.362656°N 82.557194°E
- Country: India
- State: Andhra Pradesh
- District: Anakapalli

Government
  - MLA: Vangalapudi Anitha (TDP)

Area
  - Total: 14.5 km^{2} (5.6 sq mi)

Population (2011)
  - Total: 127,650
  - Density: 8,800/km^{2} (22,800/sq mi)

Languages
  - Official: Telugu
- Time zone: UTC+5:30 (IST)
- PIN: 531126
- Vehicle Registration: AP31 (Former); AP39 (from 30 January 2019)

Payakaraopeta is a City in anakapalli district in the state of Andhra Pradesh in India. Payakaraopeta is a gate Way of Visakhapatnam. Tuni and Payakaraopeta are Twin Citys in Andhra Pradesh. Payakaraopeta City is fastest growing City in Andhra Pradesh. In the year 2011, The first AC library in united Andhra Pradesh was opened here.

== Demographics ==
As of Census 2011 the City has a population of 27,650. Average Sex Ratio of the City is of 1038 against state average of 993. Population of Children with age of 0-6 is 2864 which is 10.61% of total population of Payakaraopeta. Child Sex Ratio in Payakaraopeta is around 978 compared to Andhra Pradesh state average of 939. Literacy rate of the town is 76.81% higher than state average of 67.02%.

== Transport ==
Payakaraopet City has an APSRTC bus station from where there are buses to Anakapalli, Narsipatnam, Visakhapatnam, Rajahmundry and Kakinada.It is located at a distance of 0 km from Tuni. State runs APS RTC bus services from many cities in the State to this City. Being next to Tuni railway station, you can go anywhere in the country from this railway station.

== Politics ==
=== Assembly constituency ===
Payakaraopeta is an assembly constituency in Andhra Pradesh.

List of Elected Members:

- 1951 - Raja Sagi Suryanarayana Raju
- 1962 - Mande Pitchaiah
- 1967 and 1972 - Gantlana Suryanarayana
- 1978 - Maruthi Adeyya
- 1983 - Sumana Gantela
- 1989 and 1994 - Kakara Nookaraju
- 1999 and 2004 - Chengala Venata Rao
- 2009 - Golla Baburao (Congress)
- 2012 - Golla Baburao resigned
- 2012 - Golla Baburao (YSRCP)
- 2014 - Vangalapudi Anitha (TDP)
- 2019 - Golla Baburao (ysrcp)
- 2024 - Vangalapudi Anitha (TDP

== Education ==
The primary and secondary school education is imparted by government, aided and private schools, under the School Education Department of the state. The medium of instruction followed by different schools are English, Telugu.

== Schools and Colleges ==
- Samayamanthula Reddy Government Junior College
- Government I.T.I College
- Siddhartha Junior College
- Connossa school
- Sri Prakash vidhya Niketan
- Sri Prakash Junior College
- Sun flower school
- Manna public school
- Sri Chaitanya College
- Sri Prakash PG College
- Gowtham Model School
- Sri chaitanya E.M School
- Bashyam school
- Dream India School
- EuroKids Pre-School (AC campus)
- Tirumala school
- Gayathri Public School
- Gowtham Model School
- Government girls High school
- Government Raja High school
- Loyola School
- Manna Public School
- Shemford School
- Ravinadra bharathi school
- Siddhartha High school
- Siddartha Public School
- Sri Matha EM school
- Sri Chaitanya
- Shemford Little Stars School
- Vivekavardhani English Medium School
- Vijaya Public School
- Narayana e techno school
- Tagore Convent School
