= Alexander Rea =

- Born: 17 October 1858; Dundee, Scotland
- Died: 4 February 1924 (aged 65); Bangalore, Mysore State, British India
- Resting place: Wesleyan Church, Bangalore
- Occupation: Archaeologist
- Employer: Archaeological Survey of India
- Known for: Excavation of the Pallavaram sarcophagus; Excavations at Adichanallur (unearthing gold diadems); Excavations of Buddhist stupas at Amaravati and Bhattiprolu; Documentation of Pallava architecture
- Title: Superintendent of the Archaeological Survey of Southern India

Alexander Rea (17 October 1858 — 4 February 1924) was a British archaeologist who worked mainly in South British India. He is known for unearthing a sarcophagus from the hillocks of Pallavaram in Tamil Nadu.

== Early life ==
Rea was born in Dundee and educated at Glasgow. He is a F.S.A (Scot). He reached British India in 1882 and joined the Archaeological survey of Southern India.

== Career ==
First Assistant. Archaeological Survey of South India in 1882. He worked as acting lecturer on Art and Geometry in the School of Arts. Madras, between 1884 and 1888. He was Professional Adviser to Government on the conservation of ancient monuments; Member for Archaeology on the Sub-Committee on the Public Services Commission in 1887. Rea was deputed to examine and report on certain Pre-historic burial places in Madras, Chingleput, and Kodaikanal in July 1887. Rea worked as assistant editor, "Epigraphia Indica" and Record of the Archaeological Survey of India in 1888. He took charge as In charge of the Office of the Archaeological Survey of Western India from 9 July to 8 October 1889. Archaeological Surveyor in 1890; Superintendent, Archaeological Survey, Madras, 1891. Rea was deputed to examine and report on the ancient remains in Coorg in 1893; Alexander Rea became the first Superintendent of Archaeological Survey of Southern India in 1902. Honorary Assistant Superintendent, Central Museum, Madras, 1903; He retired in 1913 as Superintendent, Archaeological Survey of Southern India. His body was buried in Wesleyan Church, Bangalore on 5 February 1924.

== Publications ==
Selected publications:

- A description of the ruins of "Vijayanagar" in the Madras Christian College Magazine, 1886;
- "Some Pre-historic Burial Places in Southern India" in the Journal of the Asiatic Society of Bengal, 1888;
- "Method of Archaeological preservation in India" in the Journal of the Royal Asiatic Society of Great Britain and Ireland, 1890;
- "Pallava Architecture"
