= Kantabamsuguda =

- Census Town
- Location in Andhra Pradesh, India
- Coordinates: 18.3225°N 82.8782°E
- Country: India
- State: Andhra Pradesh
- District: Alluri Sitharama Raju
- Mandal: Arakuloya

Population (2001)
  - Total: 6,126

Languages
  - Official: Telugu
- Time zone: UTC+5:30 (IST)
- Vehicle registration: AP

Kantabamsuguda (Telugu: కాంతబంసుగూడ, Telugu pronunciation: [kaːmt̪abamsuɡuːɖa]) is a census town in Arakuloya mandal of Alluri Sitharama Raju district of the Indian state of Andhra Pradesh.

== Demographics ==
As of 2001 India census, Kantabamsuguda had a population of 6,126. Males constitute 56% of the population and females 44%. Kantabamsuguda has an average literacy rate of 82%, higher than the national average of 59.5%: male literacy is 89%, and female literacy is 72%. In Kantabamsuguda, 10% of the population is under 6 years of age.

== Education ==
The primary and secondary school education is imparted by government, aided and private schools, under the School Education Department of the state. The medium of instruction followed by different schools are English, Telugu.
