= Makavarapalem =

Coordinates: 17°37′N 82°43′E

- Village
- Interactive map of Makavarapalem
- Location in Andhra Pradesh, India
- Country: India
- State: Andhra Pradesh
- District: Anakapalli district

Languages
  - Official: Telugu
- Time zone: UTC+5:30 (IST)
- PIN: 531113
- Vehicle Registration: AP31 (Former); AP39 (from 30 January 2019)

Makavarapalem is a village in Anakapall district in the state of Andhra Pradesh in India.
