= Tekumalla Achyutarao =

Telugu and English writer

Tekumalla Achyutarao (18 April 1880 – 12 February 1947) was one of a major critics in Telugu language. He is known for his English work "Pingali Suranarya"(Pingali Suranna, his life and works).

== Biography ==
He was born in Pothanavalasa village in Visakhapatnam district in Andhra Pradesh on 18 April 1880. His parents were Kamayya and Venkamma. He was educated in Paralakhemundi and Vijayanagaram. He married Visalakshi in 1900. He had two sons and a daughter. His son kameswararao Tekumalla, who authored "Na vangmaya mitrulu".

He trained in the college of Rajamahendravaram and joined in same college as a teacher. Later he served as Headmaster. He did M.A in Kolkata university. He retired in 1934.

He was interested in English literature. He applied his knowledge in English literary criticism to Telugu literature and wrote about poets of Vijayanagar Kingdom. He has written a famous book "Pingali suranarya". His book is the precursor of others of a similar type, dealing with ancient Telugu literature, written not only by himself but by other Telugu scholars. He died on 12 February 1947.

== Works ==
- Andhra padamulu-patalu (1916–17)
- Andhra Natakamulu-rangasthalamulu
- vijayanagara samrajyamandali andhra vagmaya charitramu.
- Pingali surana (English critique)
