= Kasimkota =

- Village
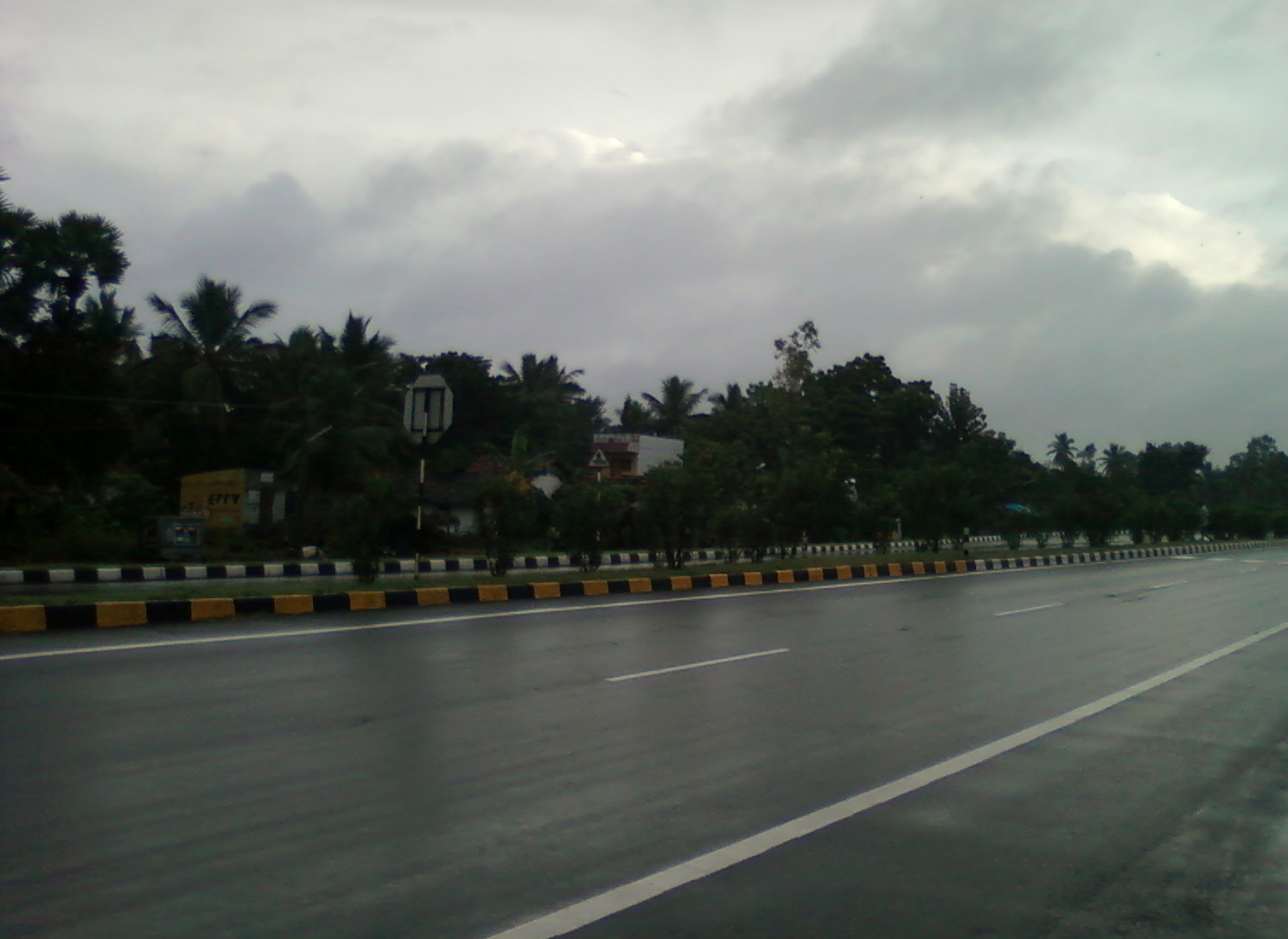
- National Highway at Kasimkota
- Interactive map of Kasimkota
- Location in Andhra Pradesh, India
- Coordinates: 17.673629°N 82.9634°E
- Country: India
- State: Andhra Pradesh
- District: Anakapalli

Area
  - Total: 161.27 km^{2} (62.27 sq mi)

Population (2011)
  - Total: 15,753
  - Density: 97.681/km^{2} (252.99/sq mi)

Languages
  - Official: Telugu
- Time zone: UTC+5:30 (IST)
- PIN: 531 031
- Telephone code: +91-8924
- Vehicle Registration: AP31 (Former); AP39 (from 30 January 2019)

Kasimkota is a village in Anakapalli district in the state of Andhra Pradesh in India. Kasimkota was one of the notable villages affected by Cyclone Hudhud.

Kasimkota railway station is a D–category station of Vijayawada division was opened in late 1800s.

Bassi Dora was arrested at Kasimkota.

Kasimkota is also part of the second largest jaggery market of the country in Anakapalle.
