= Nakkapalle =

- Census town
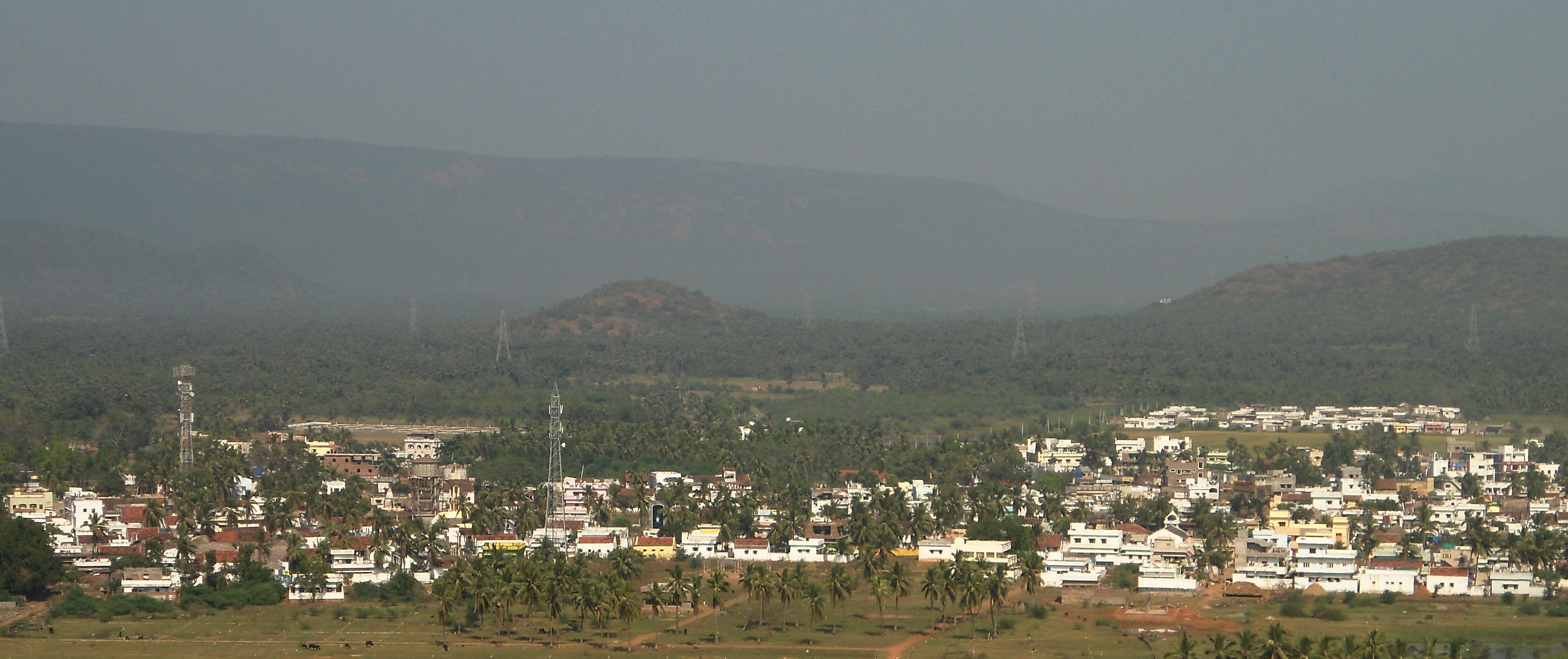
- view of Nakkapalli town from Upamaka temple
- Interactive map of Nakkapalle
- Coordinates: 17°24′38″N 82°42′58″E
- Country: India
- State: Andhra Pradesh
- District: Anakapalli

Population (2011)
  - Total: 7,603

Languages
  - Official: Telugu
- Time zone: UTC+5:30 (IST)
- PIN: 531081
- Vehicle Registration: AP31 (Former); AP39 (from 30 January 2019)

Nakkapalle or Nakkapalli is a census town in Anakapalli district in the state of Andhra Pradesh in India.

== Demographics ==
As of 2011 census the town has population of 7,603 of which 3,551 are males and 4,052 are females. Average Sex Ratio of the town is 1141 against state average of 993. Population of Children with age of 0-6 is 777 which is 10.22 % of total population of Nakkapalle. Child Sex Ratio in Nakkapalle is around 1023 compared to Andhra Pradesh state average of 939. Literacy rate of Nakkapalle town is 71.77 % higher than state average of 67.02 %.
