= Munagapaka =

Coordinates: 17°38′N 83°00′E

- Village
- Nickname: MPK
- Interactive map of Munagapaka
- Location in Andhra Pradesh, India
- Country: India
- State: Andhra Pradesh
- District: Anakapalli

Population
  - Total: 15,000+

Languages
  - Official: Telugu
- Time zone: UTC+5:30 (IST)
- Postal code: 531033
- Vehicle Registration: AP31 (Former); AP39 (from 30 January 2019)

Munagapaka is a village in Anakapalli district, in the state of Andhra Pradesh in India, with its pin code as 531033. It is also the mandal headquarters for Munagapaka mandal, which covers nearly 35 villages. In Munagapaka there are nearly more than 2000 houses with population more than 8000. Munagapaka is under the Yelamanchili constituency.
