= Anakapalli revenue division =

Anakapalli revenue division అనకాపల్లి ఆదాయ విభాగం
- revenue division
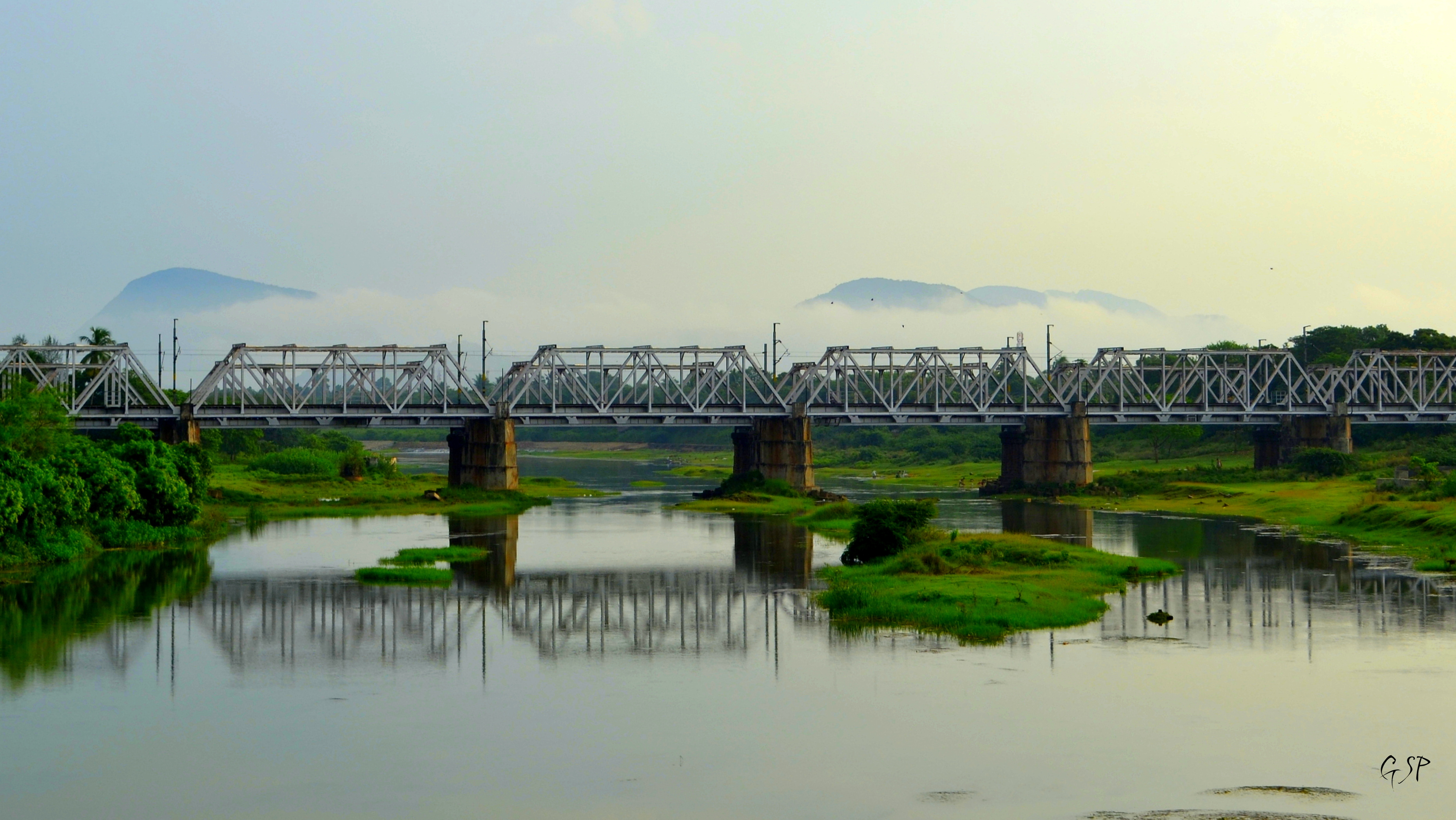
- Railway bridge over the Sarada River near Anakapalle
- Interactive map of Anakapalli revenue division
- Coordinates: 17.6913°N 83.0039°E
- Country: India
- State: Andhra Pradesh
- District: Anakapalli

Population (2011)
  - Total: 821,034

Anakapalli revenue division is an administrative division in the Anakapalli district of the Indian state of Andhra Pradesh. It is one of the three revenue divisions in the district which consists of twelve mandals under its administration. Anakapalli is the divisional headquarters.

== History ==
Based on the 2011 census, post the district restructure in 2022, the division had a population of 8,21,034 of which 7,09,263 was rural and 1,11,771 urban. Scheduled Castes and Scheduled Tribes made up 7.45% and 3.57% of the population respectively.

Hindus are 98.27% of the population while Christians are 0.70% and Muslims 0.69%.

At the time of the 2011 census 98.99% of the population spoke Telugu as their first language.

== Administration ==
There are 10 mandals under the administration of Anakapalle revenue division. They are:

1. Anakapalli
2. Butchayyapeta
3. Cheedikada
4. Chodavaram
5. Devarapalli
6. K. Kotapadu
7. Kasimkota
8. Munagapaka
9. Paravada
10. Sabbavaram

== See also ==
- List of revenue divisions in Andhra Pradesh
- List of mandals in Andhra Pradesh
