= Narsipatnam =

City in Andhra Pradesh, India

- Town
- Narsipatnam Road railway station

- Location in Andhra Pradesh, India
- Coordinates: 17.665°N 82.614°E
- Country: India
- State: Andhra Pradesh
- District: Anakapalle

Government
  - Type: Municipality
  - Body: Narsipatnam Municipality; VMRDA
  - MLA: Chintakayala ayyanna patrudu

Area
  - Total: 42.00 km^{2} (16.22 sq mi)
- Elevation: 58 m (190 ft)

Population (2011)
  - Total: 33,757
  - Density: 803.7/km^{2} (2,082/sq mi)

Languages
  - Official: Telugu
- Time zone: UTC+5:30 (IST)
- PIN: 531116
- Vehicle Registration: AP31 (Former); AP39 (from 30 January 2019)

Narsipatnam is a town in Anakapalle district of the Indian state of Andhra Pradesh. It was upgraded from a gram panchayat into municipality in 2012.

== Geography ==
Narsipatnam is located at 17.67°N 82.62°E. It has an average elevation of 58 metres (190 feet). This is one of the five places in India where the IST line passes

== Demographics ==
As of 2011 Census of India, the town had a population of 33,757. The total population constitutes, 16,076 males and 17,681 females—a sex ratio of 1100 females per 1000 males, higher than the national average of 940 per 1000. 3,262 children are in the age group of 0–6 years, of which 1,684 are boys and 1,578 are girls—a ratio of 937 per 1000.The average literacy rate stands at 78.83% with 24,040 literates, significantly higher than the national average of 73.00%.

== Town parts ==
Narsipatnam had census towns of Balighattam and Peda Bodepalle which is part of the Narsipatnam municipality.

== Legislative Assembly ==
Narsipatnam is an assembly constituency in Andhra Pradesh.
