= Anakapalli district =

District in Andhra Pradesh, India

- District of Andhra Pradesh
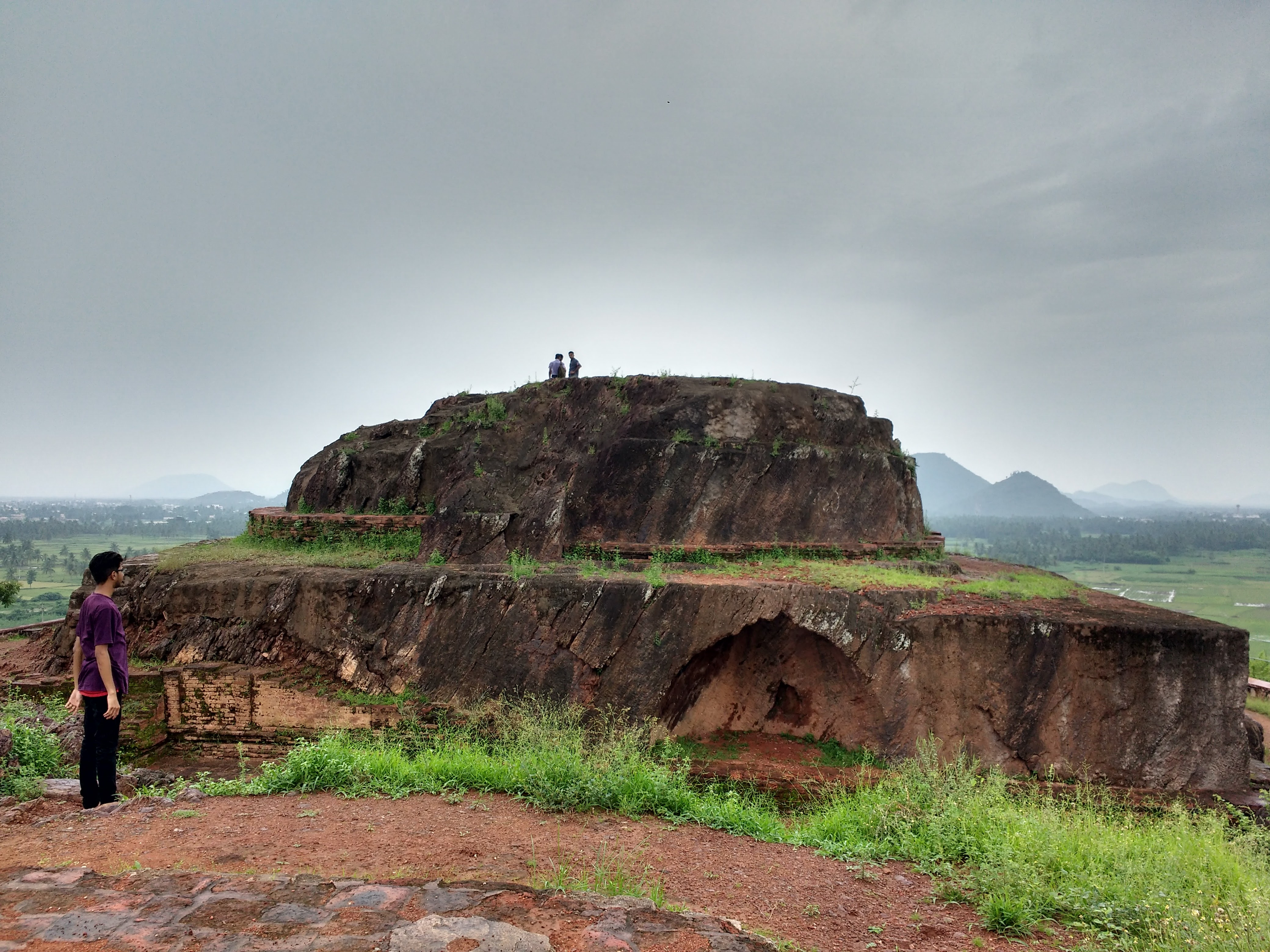
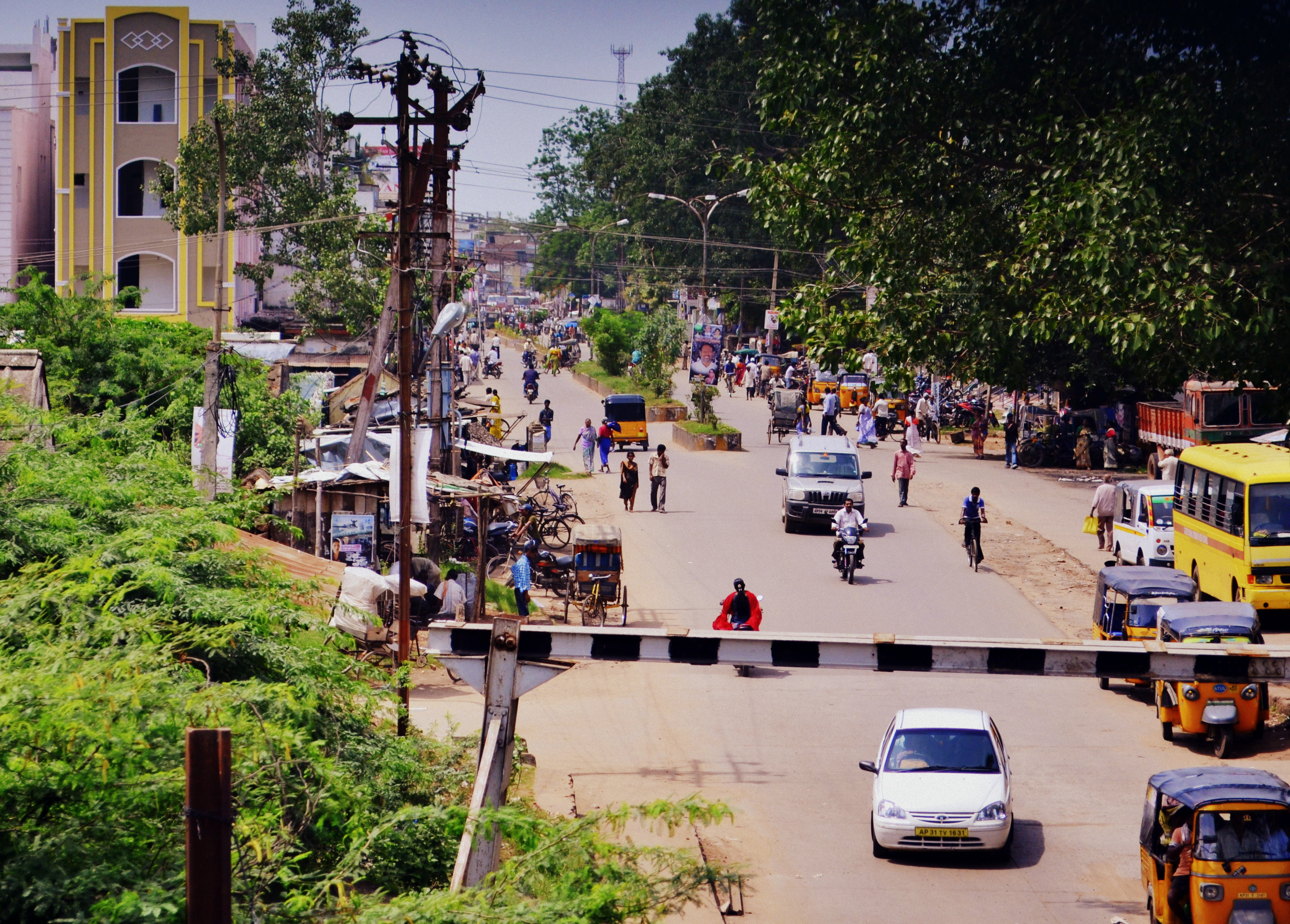
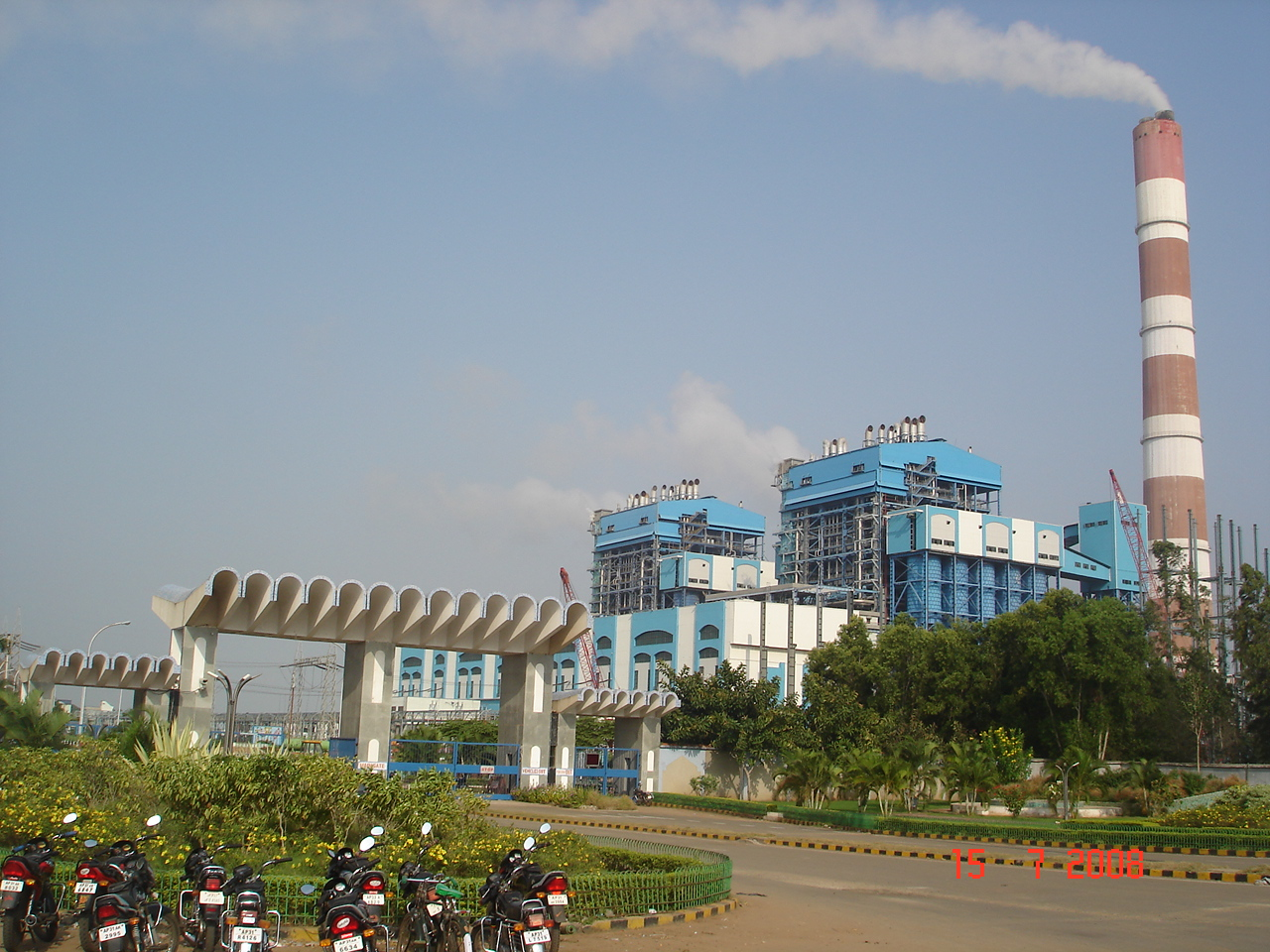
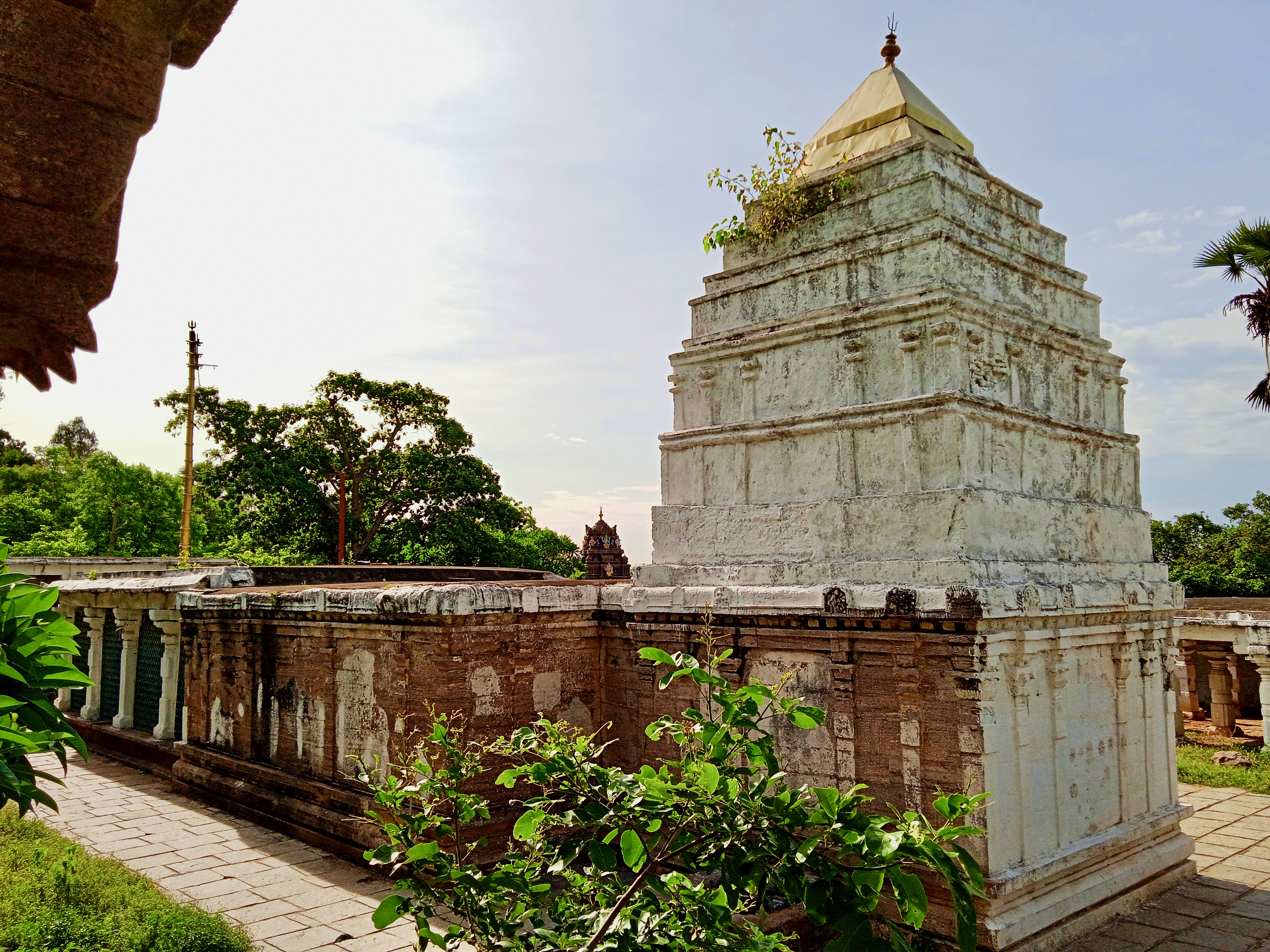
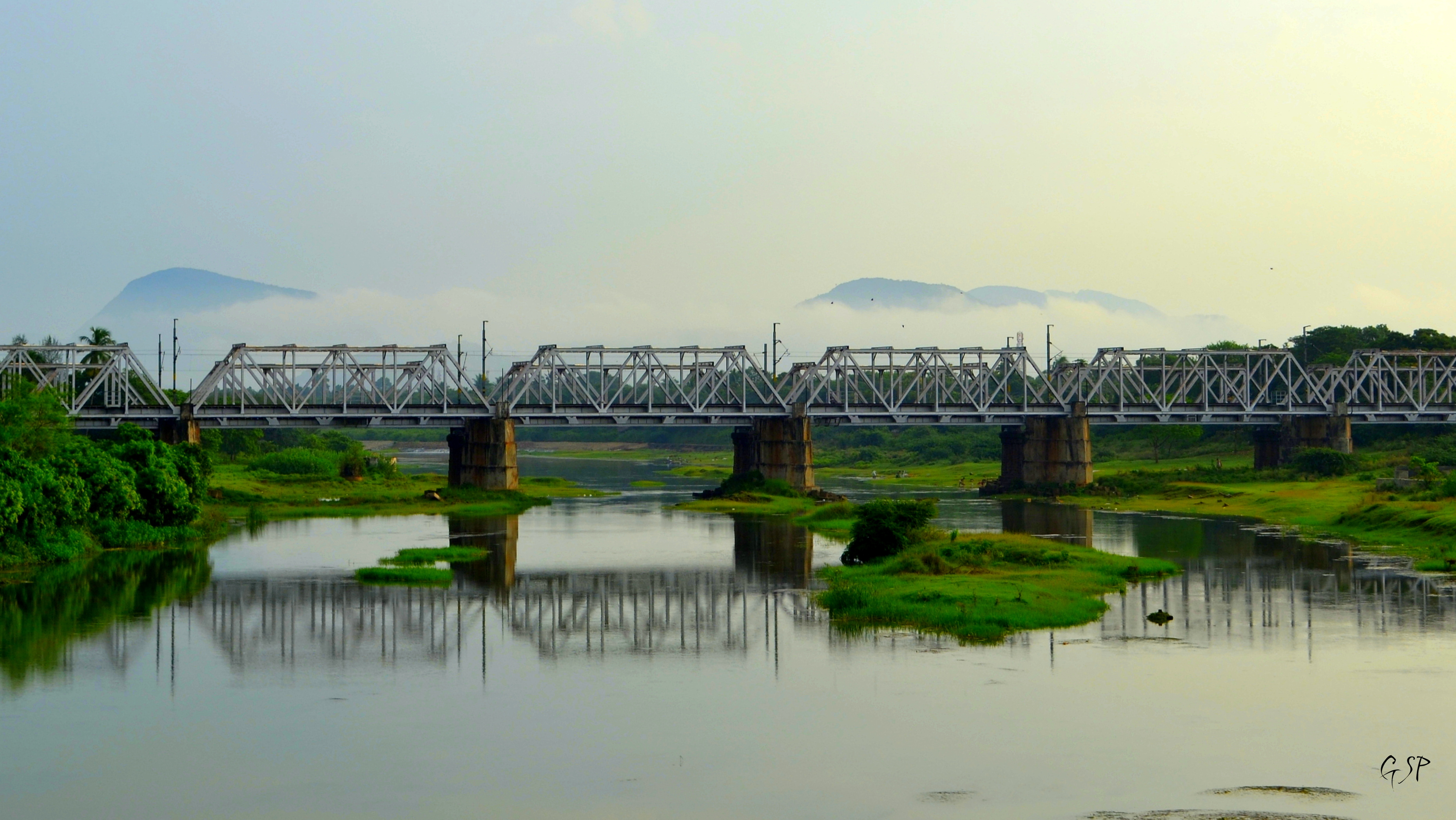
- Clockwise from top-left: Stupa at Bojjannakonda, Gandhi Nagar in Anakapalle, Dharmalingeswara Temple at Panchadharla, Bridge over the Sarada River, NTPC Simhadi Super Thermal Power Plant

- Location of Anakapalli district in Andhra Pradesh
- Interactive map of Anakapalli district
- Coordinates: 17.69°N 83.00°E
- Country: India
- State: Andhra Pradesh
- Region: Uttara Andhra
- Headquarters: Anakapalli

Government
  - Collector & District Magistrate: Smt.Vijaya Krishnan, I.A.S.
  - Lok Sabha constituencies: Anakapalli

Area
  - Total: 4,292 km^{2} (1,657 sq mi)

Population (2011)
  - Total: 1,726,998
  - Density: 402.4/km^{2} (1,042/sq mi)
  - Urban: 250,359
- Time zone: UTC+05:30 (IST)
- District LGD code: 744
- District abbreviation: NKP
- GDP (2022-23): ₹45,092 crore (equivalent to ₹490 billion or US$5.3 billion in 2026)
- Website: anakapalli.ap.gov.in

Anakapalli district is a district in the Indian state of Andhra Pradesh. It was formed on 4 April 2022 from Anakapalli and Narsipatnam revenue divisions of the old Visakhapatnam district. The administrative headquarters are at Anakapalli. Sankaram, 3 km from Anakapalli is identified to be developed as the headquarters of the new district.

== Etymology ==
This district name is derived from its headquarters Anakapalli.

== Geography ==
This district is surrounded by Alluri Sitharama Raju district to the north, Kakinada district to the west, the Bay of Bengal to the south and Vizianagaram district and Visakhapatnam district to the east.

== Demographics ==
Religions in Anakapalli district (2011)
Religion	Percent
Hinduism	98.12%
Islam	0.84%
Christianity	0.78%
Other or not stated	0.26%
Distribution of religions

At the time of the 2011 census, Anakapalli district had a population of 1,726,998, of which 250,359 (14.50%) live in urban areas. Anakapalli district had a sex ratio of 1020 females per 1000 males. Scheduled Castes and Scheduled Tribes make up 158,060 (9.15%) and 47,975 (2.78%) of the population respectively.

Telugu was the predominant language, spoken by 98.87% of the population.

== Politics ==
There are one parliamentary and seven assembly constituencies in Anakapalli district. The parliamentary constituenciy is

- Anakapalli (Lok Sabha constituency)

The assembly constituencies are

Constituency number	Name	Reserved for (SC/ST/None)	Parliament
26	Chodavaram	None	Anakapalli
27	Madugula	None	Anakapalli
30	Anakapalli	None	Anakapalli
31	Pendurthi (partially)	None	Anakapalli
32	Elamanchili	None	Anakapalli
33	Payakaraopet	SC	Anakapalli
34	Narsipatnam	None	Anakapalli

== Administrative divisions ==
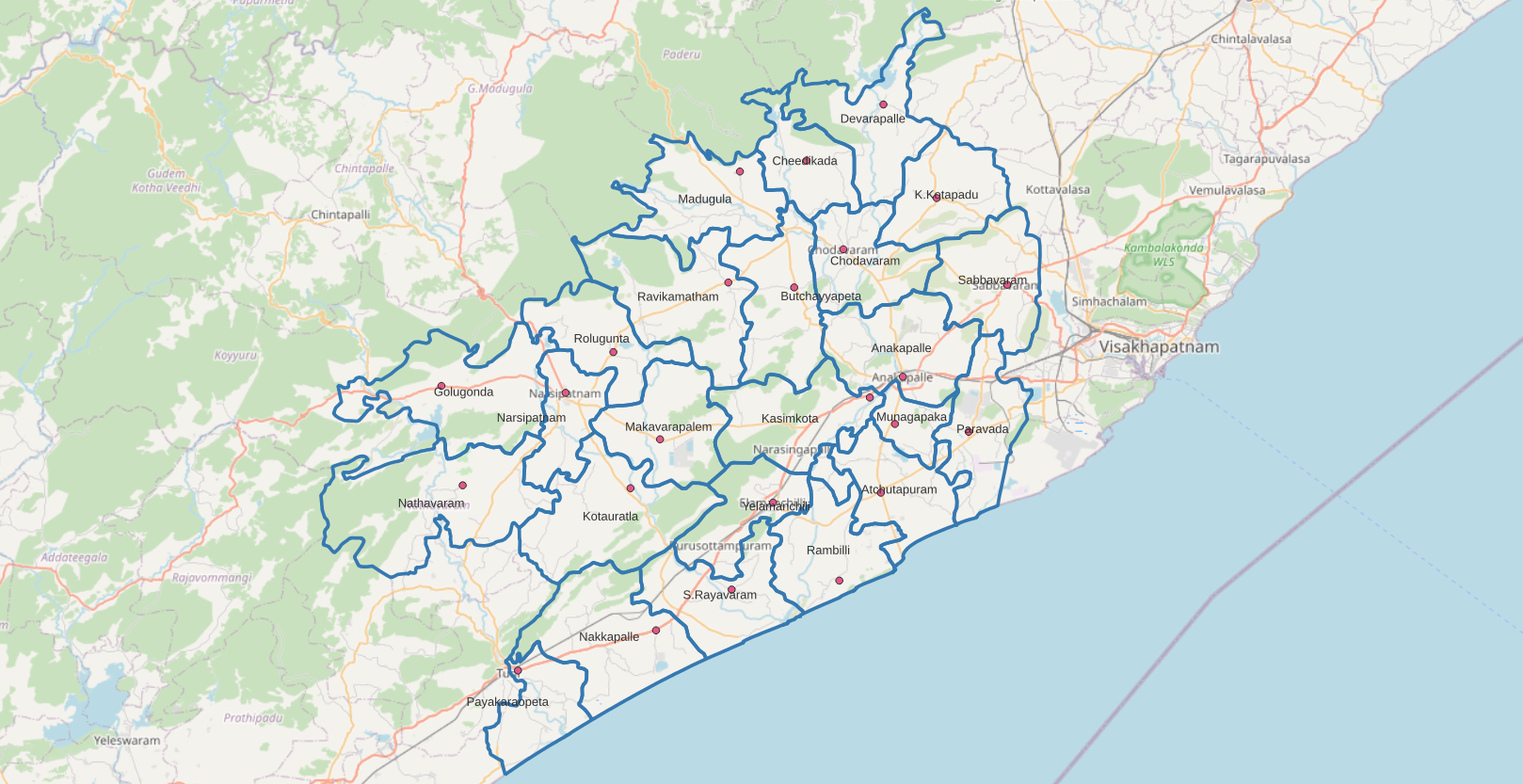
Satellite view of Anakapalli district

The district is divided into 3 revenue divisions: Anakapalli, Adduroad Junction and Narsipatnam, which are further subdivided into 24 mandals, each headed by a sub-collector.

=== Mandals ===
The list of 24 mandals in Anakapalli district, divided into 3 revenue divisions, is given below.

1. Adduroad Junction revenue division
  1. Atchutapuram
  2. Elamanchili
  3. Kotauratla
  4. Nakkapalli
  5. Payakaraopeta
  6. Rambilli
  7. S. Rayavaram
2. Anakapalle revenue division
  1. Anakapalli
  2. Butchayyapeta
  3. Cheedikada
  4. Chodavaram
  5. Devarapalli
  6. K. Kotapadu
  7. Kasimkota
  8. Munagapaka
  9. Paravada
  10. Sabbavaram
3. Narsipatnam revenue division
  1. Golugonda
  2. Madugula
  3. Makavarapalem
  4. Narsipatnam
  5. Nathavaram
  6. Ravikamatham
  7. Rolugunta

=== Cities and towns ===
The district consists of two municipalities and 8 census towns. Anakapalli falls under Greater Visakhapatnam Municipal Corporation and the two municipalities in the district are Elamanchili and Narsipatnam. The census towns are Bowluvada, Chodavaram, Kantabamsuguda, Mulakuddu, Nakkapalle, Narsipatnam, Peda Boddepalle, Payakaraopeta.

== Notable people from Anakapalli district ==
- Aarudra, writer
- Beesetti Venkata Satyavathi, former Member of Parliament(Lok Sabha)
- Dadi Veerabhadra Rao, former state minister and Member of Legislative Assembly(Andhra Pradesh)
- Gunasekhar, film producer and director
- Gurajada Apparao, poet and writer
- Konathala Ramakrishna, former state minister and Member of Parliament(Lok Sabha)
- Malla Venkata Manikyalu, Indian weightlifter
- Peela Govinda Satyanarayana, former Member of Legislative Assembly(Andhra Pradesh)
- Peela Mallikarjuna Rao, Telugu character actor(comedian) & former general secretary of Telugu Movie Artists Association (MAA)
- Pethakamsetti Appala Narasimham, former Member of Parliament(Lok Sabha), former MLA and former VUDA Chairman
- Puri Jagannadh, film producer and director
- Shobha Naidu, kuchipudi dancer
- Sirivennela Seetharama Sastry, lyricist
- S. R. A. S. Appala Naidu, State Minister and Member of Parliament(Lok Sabha)
- Vangalapudi Anitha, Minister of Home Affairs & Disaster Management
- Villuri Venkata Ramana, former Member of Parliament(Rajya Sabha)
