= Hyderabad–Visakhapatnam Godavari Express =

Train in India

Hyderabad-Visakhapatnam Godavari Express
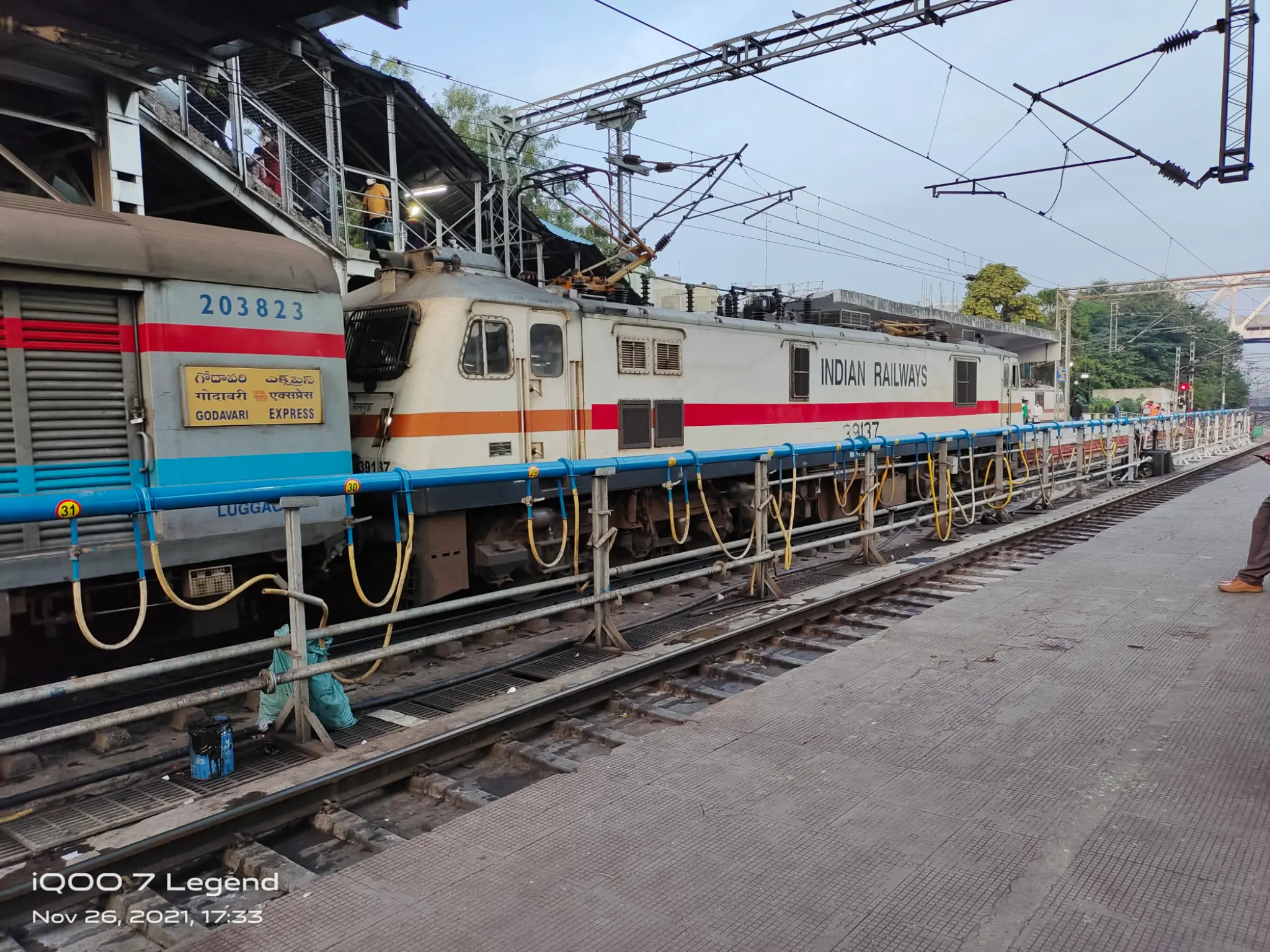
- Godavari Express at Hyderabad Nampally

Overview
- Service type: Superfast Express
- Locale: Telangana & Andhra Pradesh
- First service: 1 February 1974; 52 years ago
- Current operator: South Central Railway

Route
- Termini: Hyderabad Deccan (HYB); Visakhapatnam (VSKP)
- Stops: 18
- Distance travelled: 710 km (441 mi)
- Average journey time: 12 hours 25 minutes
- Service frequency: Daily
- Train number: 12727 / 12728

On-board services
- Classes: AC 2 Tier, AC 3 Tier, Sleeper Class, General Unreserved
- Seating arrangements: Yes
- Sleeping arrangements: Yes
- Catering facilities: E-Catering, On-board catering
- Observation facilities: Large windows
- Baggage facilities: Available
- Other facilities: Below the seats

Technical
- Rolling stock: LHB coach
- Track gauge: Broad Gauge (1,676 mm)
- Operating speed: 60 km/h (37 mph) average including halts.
Route map
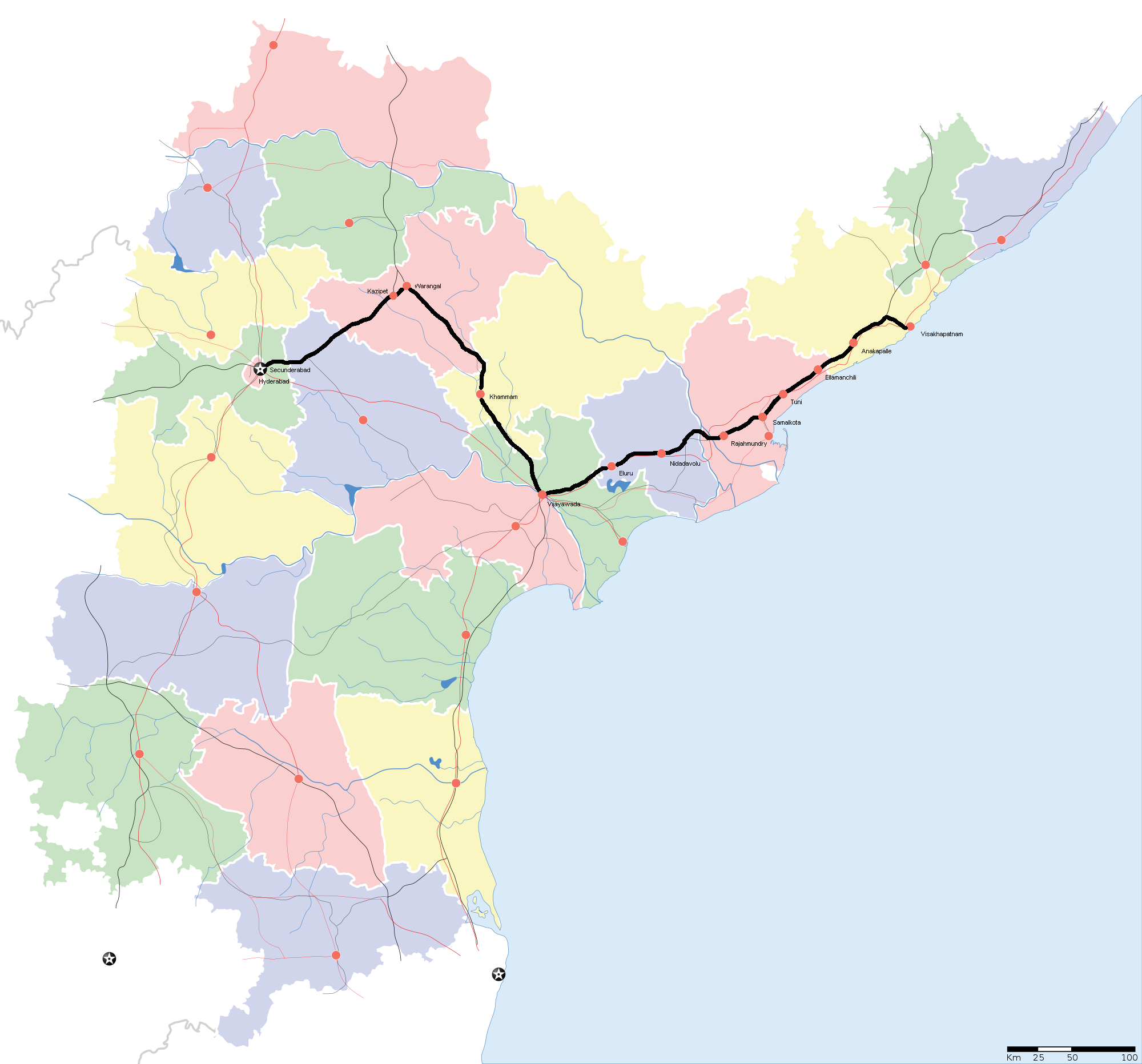
- The route map of Godavari Express.

The 12727 / 12728 Hyderabad-Visakhapatnam Godavari Express is a superfast express train of South Central Railway zone, operating between Hyderabad and Visakhapatnam.

== History ==
On 1 February 1974, the Indian Railways announced the first railway service between Hyderabad and Visakhapatnam, the Waltair-Hyderabad Express.

In the early days, the train ran once daily, departing from Visakhapatnam station at 5:20 p.m. and arriving at Hyderabad station at 6:45 a.m. the next morning. During the return journey, the train departed Hyderabad at 5:15 p.m. and arrived at Visakhapatnam station at 5:50 a.m. the next morning. The train was officially renamed Godavari Express as it provided rail connectivity to nine stations across East and West Godavari districts.

It was hauled by a steam locomotive and had 17 coaches. Its highest speed of 50 km/h came between Samalkot and Rajahmundry. A slip service was introduced during 1975, and the train began to run up to Kakinada. As a result, five more coaches were added. The train entered a Rake Sharing Agreement or RSA with Simhadri Express, which ran between Visakhapatnam and Rajahmundry. However, in 1980, both the slip service and the RSA were canceled as the Simhadri Express was extended to Bhimavaram and the Kakinada–Secunderabad Gowthami Express was introduced.

The train later ran with a diesel locomotive. By 1990, the train had become popular, and two more coaches were introduced, taking the total to 24. It became one of the longest trains in India. When the Visakhapatnam–Vijayawada line and the Vijayawada–Kazipet–Hyderabad lines were electrified, the train started running with the WAP-4 electric locomotive. Soon, the Godavari Express became the first South Central Railway train to offer 5 air-conditioned coaches.

In June 1999, the train met with its first accident, derailing at Ghanpur near Warangal. In the year 2000, the Godavari Express became the first train in the South Central railway to run with an air-conditioned first-class coach and the first in the Zone to have 6 air-conditioned coaches. In 2011, on becoming a Superfast train, it was renumbered to 12727 and was hauled by a WAP-7. Engineers modified the train timings again, and consequently, further reduced the journey time by 15 minutes.

In July and August 2011, passengers of the air-conditioned coaches were robbed twice, and a hoax call was made regarding a bomb in the sixth coach. As a result, safety was enhanced, and the train started running with a WAP-7 from end to end. This train then became the first to run with a WAP-7 between Visakhapatnam and Vijayawada. Hundreds of people from Visakhapatnam district travel to Secunderabad daily through Godavari Express.

== Coaches ==
The train was upgraded with LHB coach on 1 June 2020, running from both Hyderabad and Visakhapatnam by South Central Railway. Previously It was upgraded as an Utkrist CBC rake train in 2018. It ran until 22 March 2020 when lockdown started.

== Route and halts ==
- Visakhapatnam
- Duvvada
- Anakapalle
- Elamanchili
- Narsipatnam Road
- Tuni
- Annavaram
- Pithapuram
- Samalkot Junction
- Anaparti
- Rajahmundry
- Nidadavolu Junction
- Tadepalligudem
- Eluru
- Vijayawada Junction
- Khammam
- Warangal
- Kazipet Junction
- Secunderabad Junction
- Hyderabad Deccan

== Traction ==
It is hauled by a Lallaguda Loco Shed based WAP-7 electric locomotive from end to end.

== Celebration ==
The South coast Railway in Visakhapatnam Junction and South Central Railway in Hyderabad Deccan has celebrated which the train marked the 50th anniversary of a train on February 2, 2024.

== See also ==
- Secunderabad railway station
- Visakhapatnam railway station
