= Mallavaram railway station =

Railway station in Andhra Pradesh, India

Mallavaram

General information
- Location: Chebrolu, Kakinada district, Andhra Pradesh; India
- Coordinates: 17°11′12″N 82°19′17″E
- Elevation: 14 m (46 ft)
- System: Passenger train station
- Owner: Indian Railways
- Operator: South Coast Railway zone
- Line: Visakhapatnam–Vijayawada of Howrah–Chennai main line and
- Platforms: 2
- Tracks: 2 1,676 mm (5 ft 6 in)

Construction
- Structure type: Standard (on-ground station)
- Parking: Available

Other information
- Status: Closed
- Station code: MVRM
- Zone(s): South Coast Railway zone
- Division(s): Vijayawada

History
- Electrified: 25 kV AC 50 Hz OHLE
Location
- Location within Andhra Pradesh

Mallavaram railway station (station code:MVRM), is an Indian Railways station in Chebrolu, a village in Kakinada district of Andhra Pradesh. It lies on the Vijayawada–Chennai section and is administered under Vijayawada railway division of South Coast Railway zone.

== History ==
Between 1893 and 1896, 1,288 km (800 mi) of the East Coast State Railway, between Vijayawada and Cuttack was opened for traffic. The southern part of the East Coast State Railway (from Waltair to Vijayawada) was taken over by Madras Railway in 1901.

Preceding station	Indian Railways	Following station
Durgada Gate towards ?	South Coast Railway zone Visakhapatnam–Vijayawada of Howrah–Chennai main line	Gollaprolu towards ?
