= Peddabrahmadevam railway station =

Railway station in Andhra Pradesh, India

Peddabrahmadevam

General information
- Location: Peddabrahmadevam, Kakinada district, Andhra Pradesh; India
- Coordinates: 16°59′26″N 82°04′42″E
- Elevation: 17 m (56 ft)
- System: Passenger train station
- Owner: Indian Railways
- Operator: South Central Railway zone
- Line: Visakhapatnam–Vijayawada section of Howrah–Chennai main line and
- Platforms: 2
- Tracks: 2 1,676 mm (5 ft 6 in)

Construction
- Structure type: Standard (on-ground station)
- Parking: Available

Other information
- Status: Functioning
- Station code: PBD
- Zone(s): South Central Railway zone
- Division(s): Vijayawada

History
- Electrified: 25 kV AC 50 Hz OHLE
Location
- Location within India Location within Andhra Pradesh

Peddabrahmadevam is an Indian Railways station in Peddabrahmadevam, a village in Kakinada district of Andhra Pradesh. It lies on the Visakhapatnam–Vijayawada section and is administered under Vijayawada railway division of South Central Railway zone. Six trains halt in this station every day.

== History ==
Between 1893 and 1896, 1,288 km (800 mi) of the East Coast State Railway, between Vijayawada and Cuttack was opened for traffic. The southern part of the East Coast State Railway (from Waltair to Vijayawada) was taken over by Madras Railway in 1901.

Preceding station	Indian Railways	Following station
Medapadu towards ?	South Central Railway zone Visakhapatnam–Vijayawada of Howrah–Chennai main line	Bikkavolu towards ?
