= Chandrampalem railway station =

Rail station in Andhra Pradesh, India

Chandramapalem

General information
- Location: Chandramapalem, Kakinada district, Andhra Pradesh; India
- Coordinates: 17°05′00″N 82°13′14″E
- Elevation: 17 m (56 ft)
- System: Express train and Passenger train station
- Owner: Indian Railways
- Operator: South Coast Railway zone
- Line: Visakhapatnam–Vijayawada of Howrah–Chennai main line and
- Platforms: 2
- Tracks: 2 1,676 mm (5 ft 6 in)

Construction
- Structure type: Standard (on-ground station)
- Parking: Available

Other information
- Status: Closed
- Station code: CRPM
- Zone(s): South Coast Railway zone
- Division(s): Vijayawada

History
- Electrified: 25 kV AC 50 Hz OHLE
Location
- Location within Andhra Pradesh Location within India

Chandramapalem railway station (station code:CRPM), was an Indian Railways station in Chandramapalem, a village in Kakinada district of Andhra Pradesh. It lies on the Vijayawada–Chennai section and is administered under Vijayawada railway division of South Coast Railway zone. No trains halt in this station every day. It is the 806th-busiest station in the country.

== History ==
Between 1893 and 1896, 1,288 km (800 mi) of the East Coast State Railway, between Vijayawada and Cuttack was opened for traffic. The southern part of the East Coast State Railway (from Waltair to Vijayawada) was taken over by Madras Railway in 1901.

Preceding station	Indian Railways	Following station
Pithapuram towards ?	South Coast Railway zone Visakhapatnam–Vijayawada of Howrah–Chennai main line	Samalkot Junction towards ?
