= Duvvada–Vijayawada section =

Indian railway route

Vijayawada–Duvvada section
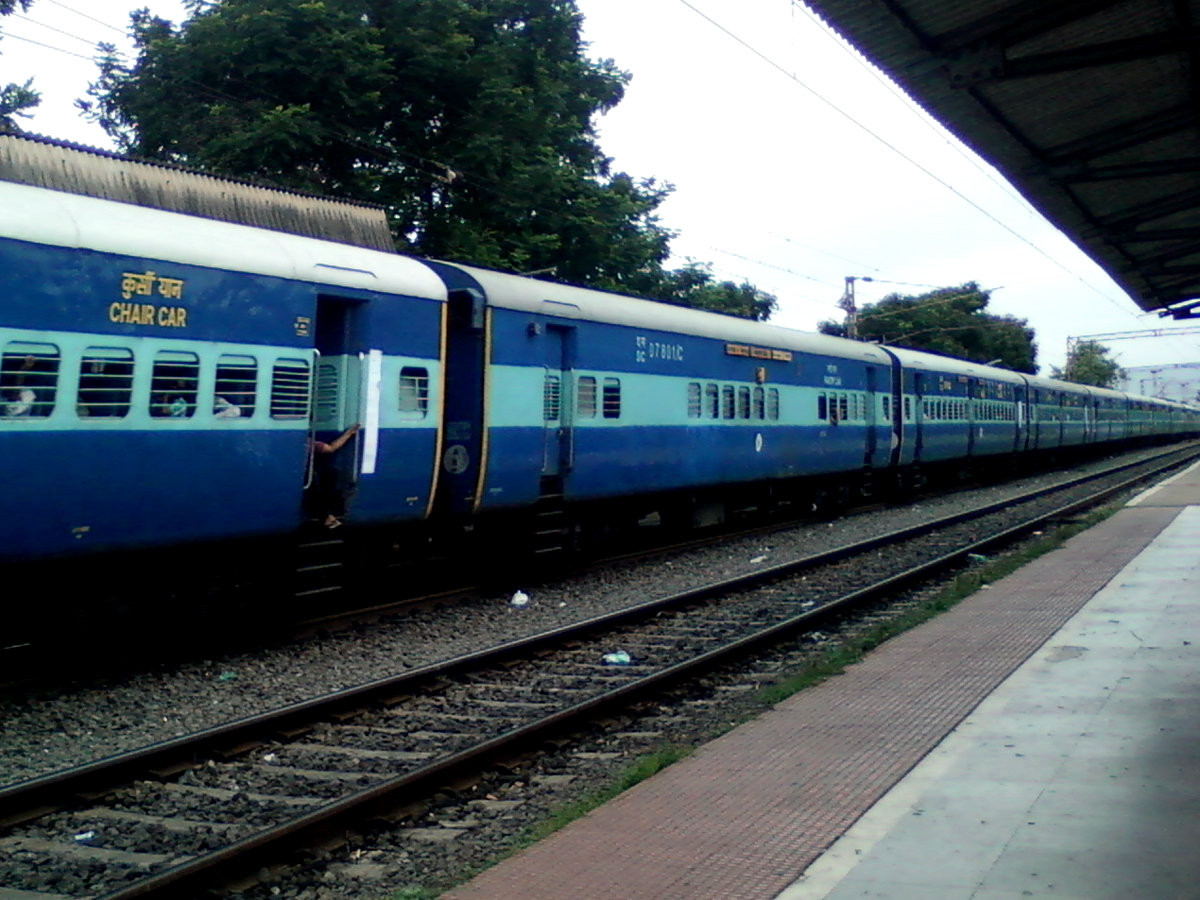
- Ratnachal Express is one of the fastest and prestigious trains on Vijayawada- Duvvada section

Overview
- Status: Operational
- Owner: Indian Railways
- Locale: Andhra Pradesh
- Termini: Vijayawada; Duvvada

Service
- Operator: South Coast Railway

History
- Opened: 1897

Technical
- Track length: 350 km (217 mi)
- Number of tracks: 2
- Track gauge: 5 ft 6 in (1,676 mm) broad gauge
- Operating speed: up to 130 km/h (81 mph)
Route map
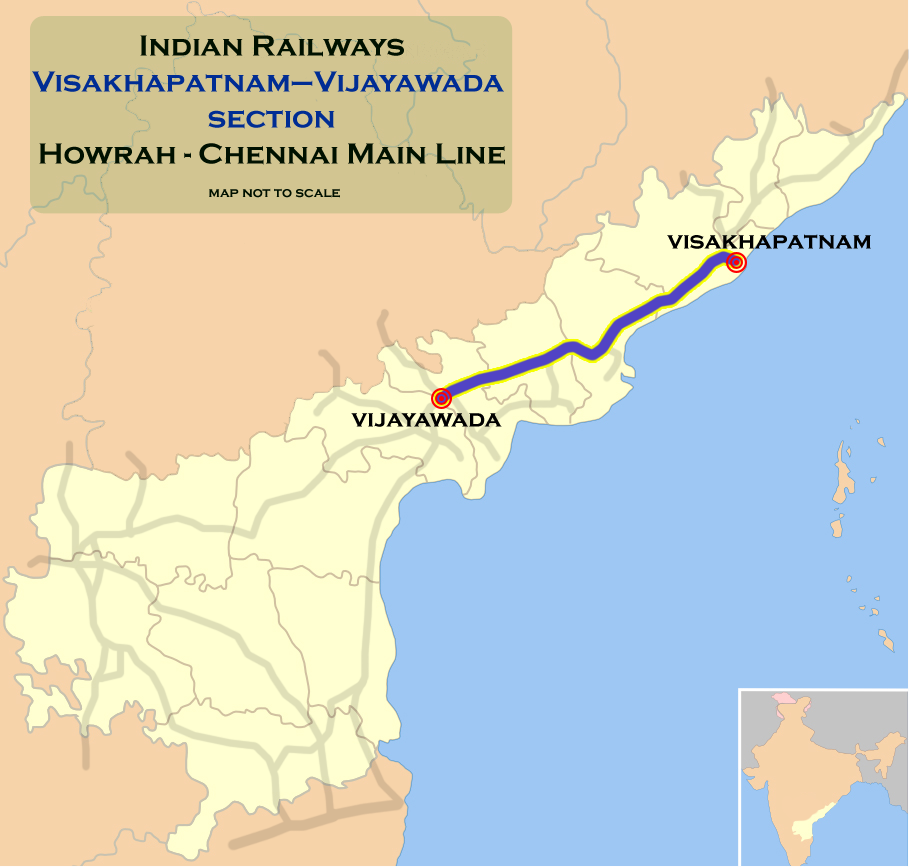
- Sources: Google maps, India Rail Info 57226, Visakhapatnam-Machilipatnam passenger, Machilipatnam Vijayawada DEMU, Kakinada-Kotipalli Rail Car, Narsapur Hyerabad Express; Narsapur-Bhimavaram Passenger

The Vijayawada-Duvvada section (also known as Visakhapatnam–Vijayawada line) is a railway line connecting Duvvada in the city of Visakhapatnam and Vijayawada, both in the Indian state of Andhra Pradesh. The main line is part of the Howrah–Chennai main line. The track from Duvvada to Thadi is under the administrative jurisdiction of East Coast Railway zone, and the rest of the line from Vijayawada to Anakapalle is under the administrative jurisdiction of South Central Railway zone.

== History ==
Some years before passenger railways started functioning in India railway lines were laid for carrying construction materials. Amongst these were a line used for construction of the Solani aqueduct over the Ganges Canal near Roorkee in the 1830s, the Red Hill Railroad in 1837 used for construction of a canal near Chennai, and the Godavari Dam Construction Railway used for transporting materials for the construction of the Dowlaisweram Anicut at Rajahmundry around 1845. The project was completed in 1852 and the railway was closed down.

The Red Hill Railroad near Chennai, used in 1837 for transporting granite, is considered by many as the first operational railway in India. Madras Railway was incorporated in 1853 the Great Southern Railway of India was formed in 1858. The Great Southern of India Railway was merged with the Carnatic Railway in 1872 and renamed South Indian Railway in 1874. The main eastward route of Southern Mahratta Railway connected with other routes till Vijayawada (then known as Bezwada) in 1888. The mainline of Nizam's Guaranteed State Railway was extended to Vijayawada in 1889.

During the period 1893 to 1896, 1,287 km (800 mi) of the East Coast State Railway, from Vijayawada to Cuttack was built and opened to traffic. The construction of the Old Godavari Bridge in 1897 and construction of the Vijayawada–Madras link in 1899 enabled the through running of trains.

The southern part of the East Coast State Railway (from Waltair to Vijayawada) was taken over by Madras Railway in 1901.

=== Railway reorganization ===
In the early 1950s legislation was passed authorizing the central government to take over independent railway systems that were there. On 14 April 1951 the Madras and Southern Mahratta Railway, the South Indian Railway Company and Mysore State Railway were merged to form Southern Railway. Subsequently, Nizam's Guaranteed State Railway was also merged into Southern Railway. On 2 October 1966, the Secunderabad, Solapur, Hubli and Vijayawada Divisions, covering the former territories of Nizam's Guaranteed State Railway and certain portions of Madras and Southern Mahratta Railway were separated from Southern Railway to form the South Central Railway. In 1977, Guntakal division of Southern Railway was transferred to South Coast Railway and the Solapur division transferred to Central Railway. Amongst the seven new zones created in 2010 was South Western Railway, which was carved out of Southern Railway. In 2019 it was moved to South Coast Railway zone.

== Stations ==
- Eluru
- Bhimadole
- Duvvada
- Anakapalle
- Kasimkota
- Bayyavaram
- Narasingapalli
- Elamanchili
- Regupalem
- Narsipatnam Road
- Gullipadu
- Tuni
- Hamsavaram
- Timmapuram
- Annavaram
- Ravikampadu
- Durgada Gate
- Gollaprolu
- Pithapuram
- Samalkot Junction
- Gudaparti
- Medapadu
- Pedabramadvam (alternatively Peddabrahmadevam)
- Bikkavolu
- Balabhadrapuram
- Anaparti
- Anaparti
- Dwarapudi
- Kesavaram
- Kadiyam
- Rajahmundry
- Marripalem
- Simhachalam
- Pendurthi (alternatively Pendurti)
- Peda Avutapalle
- Gunadala
- Vijayawada
- Tadepalligudem

== Electrification ==
Howrah–Chennai Mail was the first train in South Eastern Railway to be hauled by a diesel engine (WDM-1) in 1965.

== Speed limits ==
The entire Kharagpur–Duvvada–Vijayawada main line is classified as a "Group B" line which can take speeds up to 130 km/h. On the branch lines the speed limit is 100 km/h.

== Passenger movement ==
Eluru, Rajahmundry and Vijayawada, on this line, are amongst the top hundred booking stations of Indian Railway.
