= Duvvada railway station =

Railway station in Andhra Pradesh, India

Duvvada
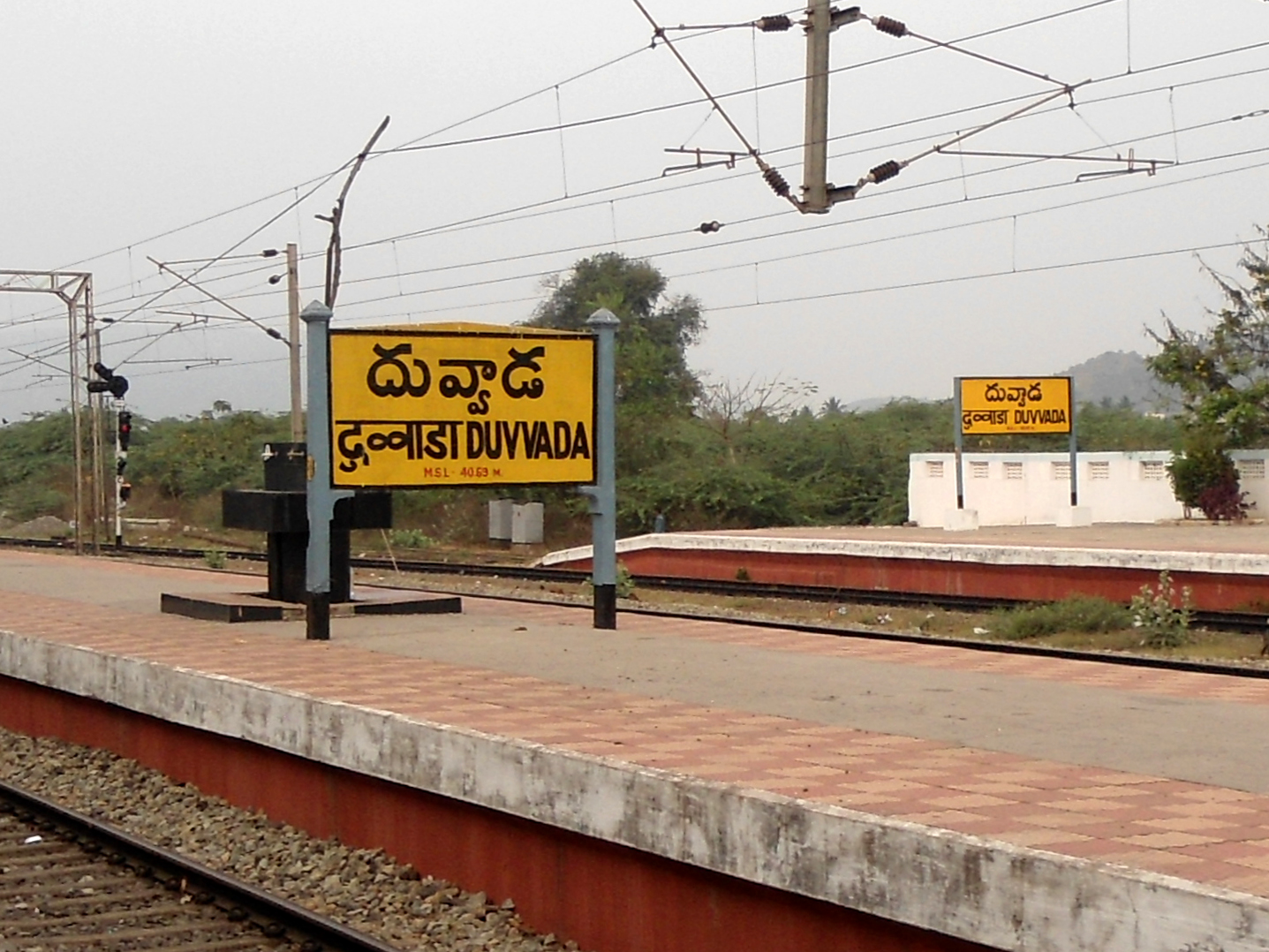
- Duvvada railway station

General information
- Location: Duvvada, Visakhapatnam, Andhra Pradesh, 530046; India
- Coordinates: 17°42′12″N 83°09′07″E
- Elevation: 46 m (151 ft)
- System: Indian Railways station
- Line: Visakhapatnam–Vijayawada section of Howrah–Chennai main line
- Platforms: 4
- Tracks: 5 ft 6 in (1,676 mm) broad gauge

Construction
- Structure type: Standard (on-ground station)
- Parking: Available

Other information
- Status: Functioning
- Station code: DVD
- Zone(s): South Coast Railway
- Division(s): Visakhapatnam

Services
Preceding station	Indian Railways	Following station
Marripalem towards ?	South Coast Railway zone Visakhapatnam–Vijayawada section of Howrah–Chennai main line	Thadi towards ?
Location
- Location within Visakhapatnam

Duvvada railway station (station code:DVD) located in the Indian state of Andhra Pradesh, serves Duvvada, the southern outskirts of Visakhapatnam. It lies on the Howrah–Chennai main line.

== History ==
Between 1893 and 1896, 1,288 km (800 mi) of the East Coast State Railway was opened for traffic. In 1898–99, Bengal Nagpur Railway was linked to the lines in southern India.

Visakhapatnam Steel Plant was established in the 1980s and the first coke oven battery was commissioned in 1989.

== Development ==
With the expansion of Visakhapatnam city, particularly with the setting up of Visakhapatnam Steel Plant, large groups of people started living away from the main city. People inhabiting neighbourhoods such as Aganampudi, Lankelapalem, Paravada, NTPC township, Pharma City and Ukkunagaram needed a large railway station nearer to their homes. Duvvada railway station serves the population in the southern outskirts of Visakhapatnam.

The nearest airport is Visakhapatnam Airport/VTZ which is 8 km from Duvvada railway station. Lifts are under construction at the platforms

== Passenger movement ==
Duvvada railway station serves about 108,000 passengers on a daily basis. Many trains always rush like Jhanmabhoomi express, Ratnachal express which are inter city service to other big cities like Secunderabad and Vijayawada.

== Gallery ==
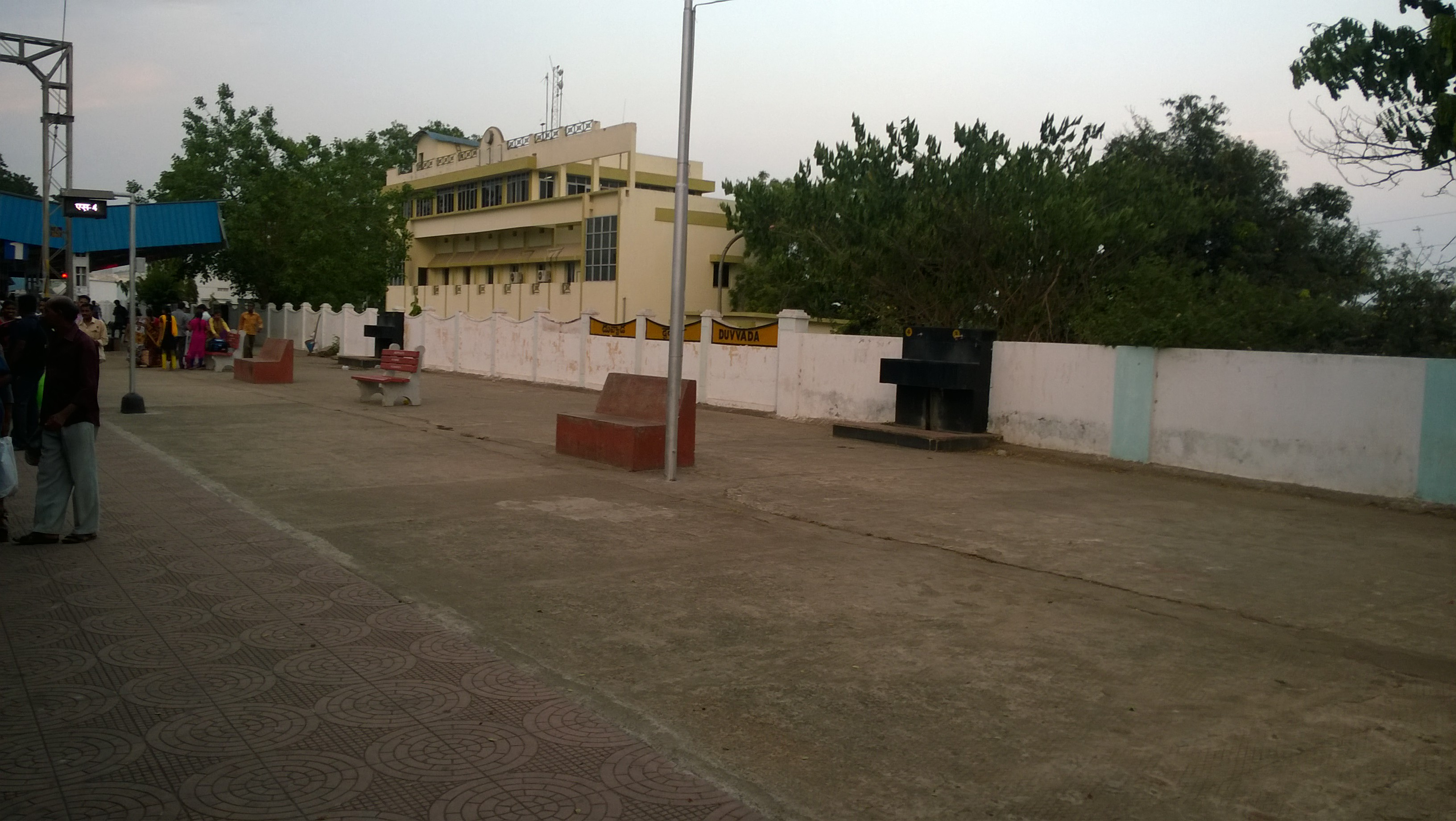
Duvvada station Platform 1

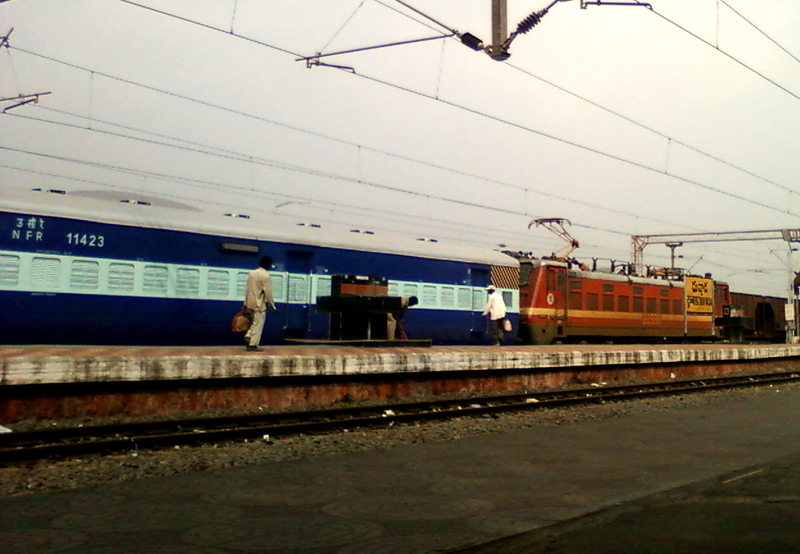
Kaziranga Express in Duvvada

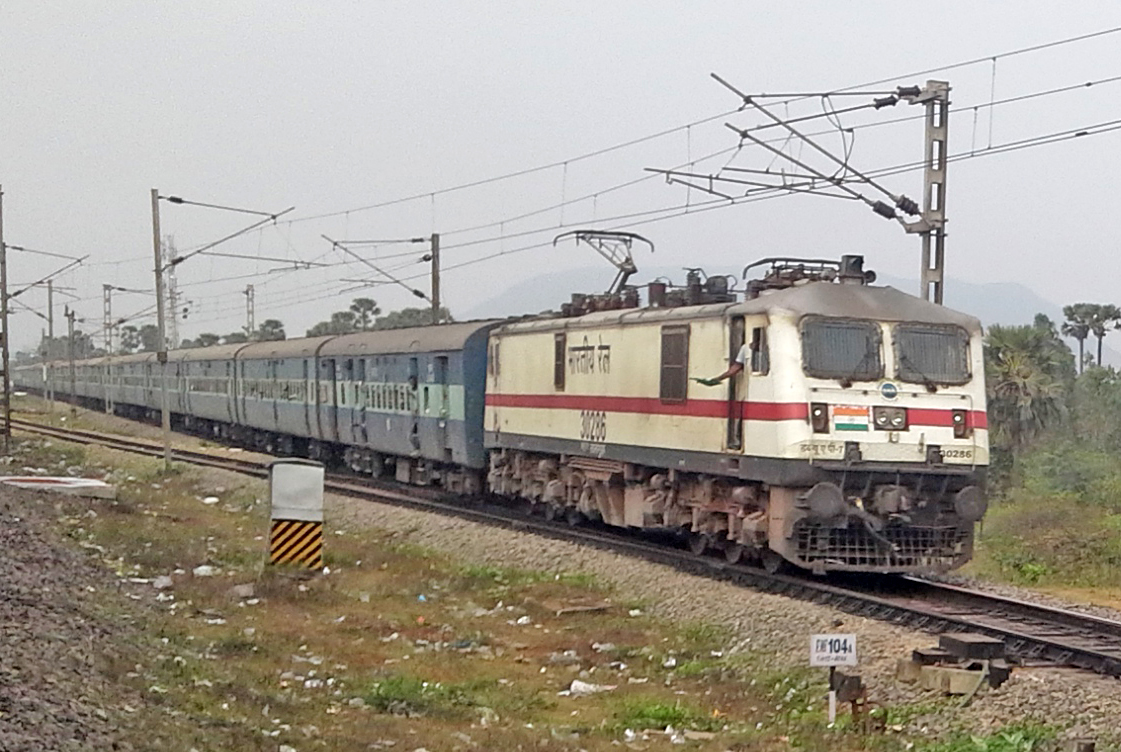
Amaravati Express with a WAP7 loco at Duvvada railway station

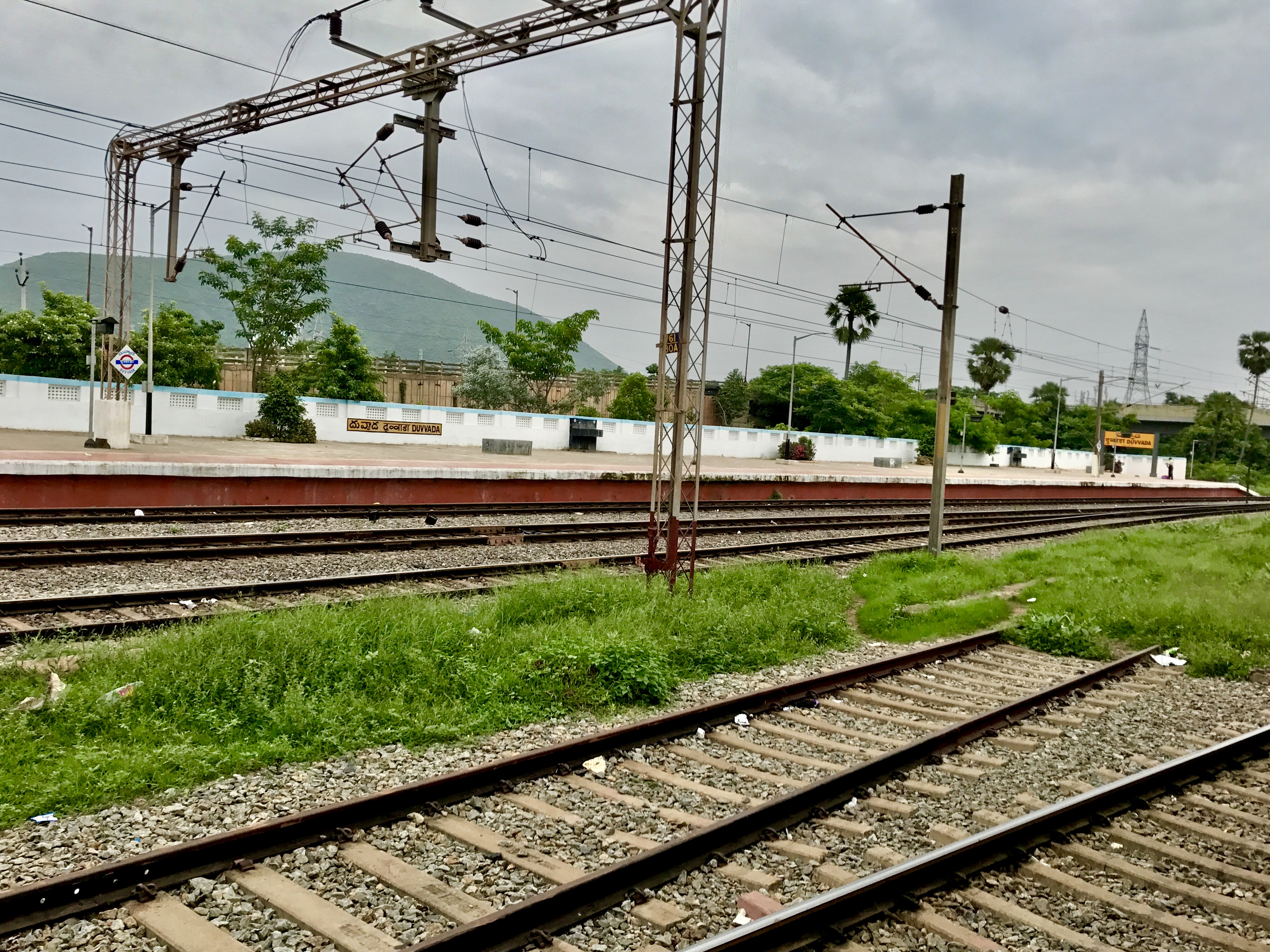
Duvvada railway station platforms

== See also ==
- Duvvada
- Visakhapatnam railway station
- Visakhapatnam railway division
- Hyderabad–Visakhapatnam Godavari Express
- Visakhapatnam Steel Plant
