= Chebrolu =

Chebrolu may refer to any of the following places in the Indian state of Andhra Pradesh:

- Chebrolu, East Godavari district, a village in Gollaprolu mandal
- Chebrolu, West Godavari district, a village in Unguturu mandal
- Chebrolu mandal, a mandal in Guntur district
  - Chebrolu, Guntur district, a temple town and mandal headquarters for Chebrolu mandal
