= Medapadu railway station =

Railway station in Andhra Pradesh, India

Medapadu
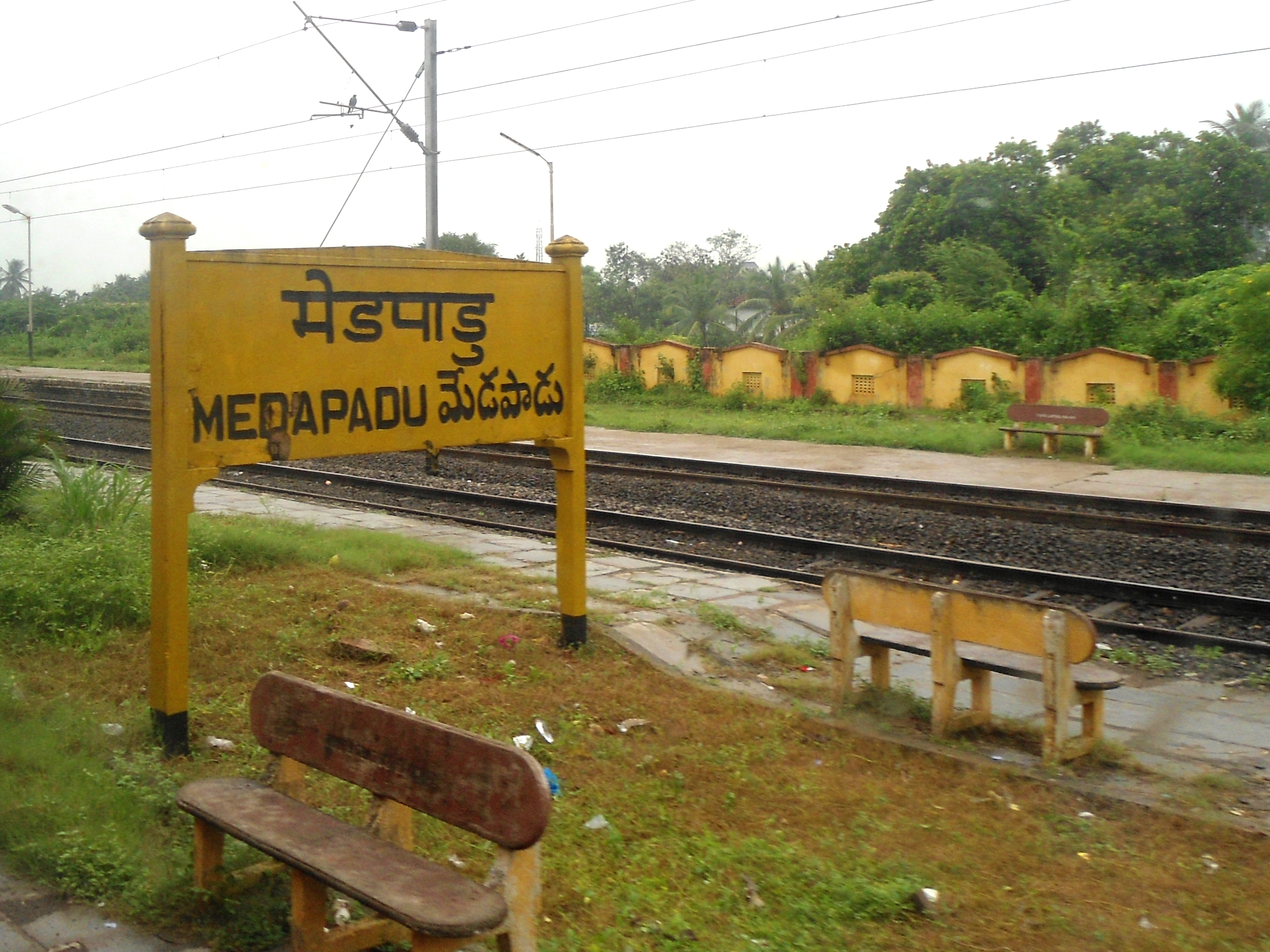

General information
- Location: Medapadu, Kakinada district, Andhra Pradesh; India
- Coordinates: 17°00′17″N 82°05′44″E
- Elevation: 21 m (69 ft)
- System: Passenger train station
- Owner: Indian Railways
- Operator: South Central Railway zone
- Line: Visakhapatnam–Vijayawada of Howrah–Chennai main line and
- Platforms: 2
- Tracks: 5 1,676 mm (5 ft 6 in)

Construction
- Structure type: Standard (on-ground station)
- Parking: Available

Other information
- Status: Functioning
- Station code: MPU
- Zone(s): South Central Railway zone
- Division(s): Vijayawada

History
- Electrified: 25 kV AC 50 Hz OHLE
Location
- Location within India Location within Andhra Pradesh

Medapadu railway station (station code:GDPT), is an Indian Railways station in Medapadu, a village in Samarlakota Mandal in Kakinada district of Andhra Pradesh. It is located 15 km towards west from district headquarters Kakinada, 12 km from Samarlakota and 232 km from State Capital Amaravathi. G. Medapadu pincode is 533434. It lies on the Vijayawada–Chennai section and is administered under Vijayawada railway division of South Central Railway zone. 11 trains halt in this station every day. It is the 2140th-busiest station in the country.

== History ==
Between 1893 and 1896, 1,288 km (800 mi) of the East Coast State Railway, between Vijayawada and Cuttack was opened for traffic. The southern part of the East Coast State Railway (from Waltair to Vijayawada) was taken over by Madras Railway in 1901.

== Classification ==
In terms of earnings and outward passengers handled, Medapadu is categorized as a Non-Suburban Grade-6 (NSG-6) railway station. Based on the re–categorization of Indian Railway stations for the period of 2017–18 and 2022–23, an NSG–6 category station earns nearly ₹1 crore and handles close to 1 million passengers.

Preceding station	Indian Railways	Following station
Gudaparti towards Visakhapatnam	South Central Railway zone Visakhapatnam–Vijayawada of Howrah–Chennai main line	Peddabrahmadevam towards Vijayawada
