= Gullipadu railway station =

Railway station in Andhra Pradesh, India

Gullipadu
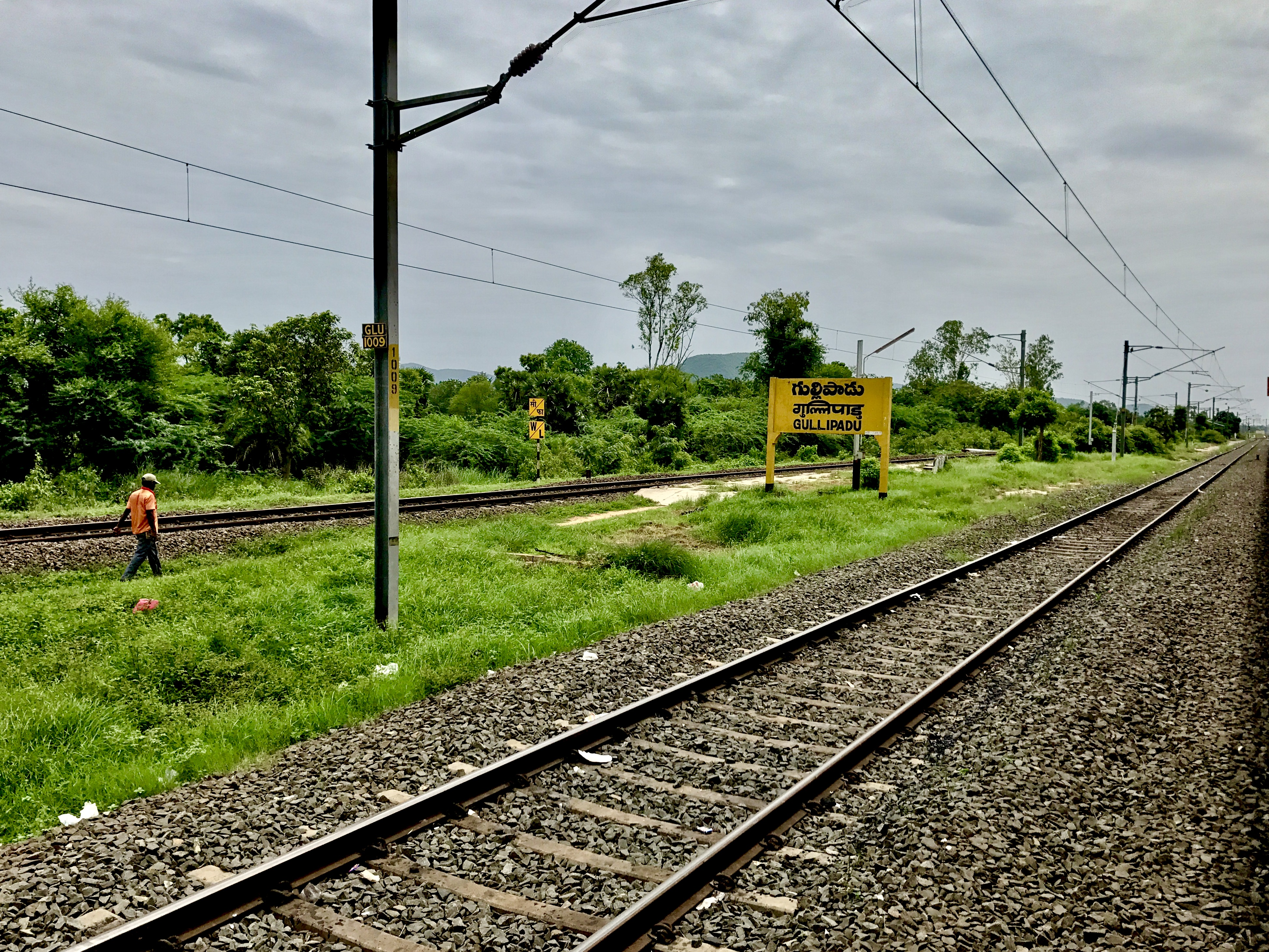

General information
- Location: Gullipadu, Visakhapatnam district, Andhra Pradesh; India
- Coordinates: 17°24′35″N 82°38′02″E
- Elevation: 30 m (98 ft)
- System: Passenger train station
- Owner: Indian Railways
- Operator: South Coast Railway zone
- Line: Visakhapatnam–Vijayawada of Howrah–Chennai main line and
- Platforms: 2
- Tracks: 1,676 mm (5 ft 6 in)

Construction
- Structure type: Standard (on-ground station)
- Parking: Available

Other information
- Status: Functioning
- Station code: GLU
- Zone(s): South Coast Railway zone
- Division(s): Vijayawada

History
- Electrified: 25 kV AC 50 Hz OHLE
Location
- Location within India Location within Andhra Pradesh

Gullipadu railway station (station code:GLU), is an Indian Railways station in Gullipadu, a village in Visakhapatnam district of Andhra Pradesh. It lies on the Vijayawada–Chennai section and is administered under Vijayawada railway division of South Coast Railway zone.

== History ==
Between 1893 and 1896, 1,288 km (800 mi) of the East Coast State Railway, between Vijayawada and Cuttack was opened for traffic. The southern part of the East Coast State Railway (from Waltair to Vijayawada) was taken over by Madras Railway in 1901.

== Classification ==
Gullipadu railway station is categorized as a Non-Suburban Grade-6 (NSG-6) station in the Vijayawada railway division.

Preceding station	Indian Railways	Following station
Narsipatnam Road towards ?	South Coast Railway zone Visakhapatnam–Vijayawada of Howrah–Chennai main line	Tuni towards ?
