= Ravikampadu railway station =

Railway station in Andhra Pradesh, India

Ravikampadu
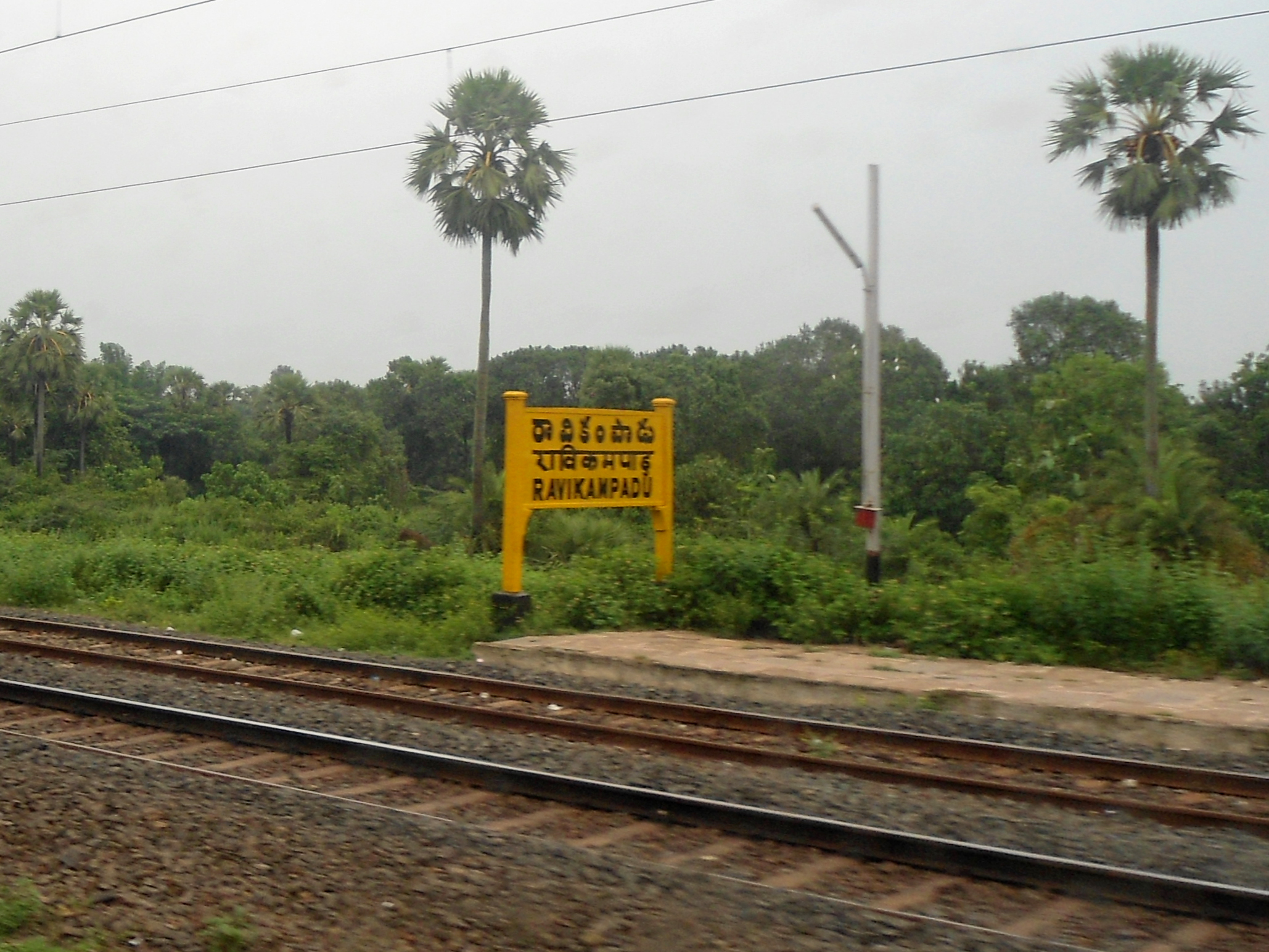

General information
- Location: Ravikampadu, Kakinada district, Andhra Pradesh; India
- Coordinates: 17°13′46″N 82°22′01″E
- Elevation: 28 m (92 ft)
- System: Passenger train station
- Owner: Indian Railways
- Operator: South Central Railway zone
- Line: Visakhapatnam–Vijayawada of Howrah–Chennai main line and
- Platforms: 2
- Tracks: 3 1,676 mm (5 ft 6 in)

Construction
- Structure type: Standard (on-ground station)
- Parking: Available

Other information
- Status: Functioning
- Station code: RVD
- Zone(s): South Central Railway zone
- Division(s): Vijayawada

History
- Electrified: 25 kV AC 50 Hz OHLE
- Former names: It was established because of Muthyala satyanarayana a farmer
Location
- Location within Andhra Pradesh Location within India

Ravikampadu railway station (station code:RVD), is an Indian Railways station in Ravikampadu, a village in Kakinada district of Andhra Pradesh. It lies on the Vijayawada–Chennai section and is administered under Vijayawada railway division of South Central Railway zone. Eight trains halt in this station every day. It is the 3885th-busiest station in the country.

== History ==
Between 1893 and 1896, 1,288 km (800 mi) of the East Coast State Railway, between Vijayawada and Cuttack was opened for traffic. The southern part of the East Coast State Railway (from Waltair to Vijayawada) was taken over by Madras Railway in 1901.

== Classification ==
In terms of earnings and outward passengers handled, Ravikampadu is categorized as a Non-Suburban Grade-6 (NSG-6) railway station. Based on the re–categorization of Indian Railway stations for the period of 2017–18 and 2022–23, an NSG–6 category station earns nearly ₹1 crore and handles close to 1 million passengers.

Preceding station	Indian Railways	Following station
Annavaram towards Visakhapatnam	South Central Railway zone Visakhapatnam–Vijayawada of Howrah–Chennai main line	Durgada Gate towards Vijayawada
