= Gollaprolu mandal =

- Mandal
- Interactive map of Gollaprolu mandal
- Country: India
- State: Andhra Pradesh
- District: Kakinada

Area
  - Total: 121.54 km^{2} (46.93 sq mi)
- Time zone: UTC+5:30 (IST)

Gollaprolu mandal is one of the 21 mandals in Kakinada District of Andhra Pradesh. As per census 2011, there are 10 villages within the mandal.

== Demographics ==
Gollaprolu mandal has total population of 78,926 as per the 2011 Census out of which 39,773 are males while 39,153 are females and the average sex ratio is 984. The total literacy rate is 61.97%. The male literacy rate is 58.35% and the female literacy rate is 52.03%.

== Towns and villages ==
=== Villages ===
1. Chebrolu
2. Chendurthi
3. China Jaggampeta
4. Durgada
5. Gollaprolu
6. Kodavali
7. Mallavaram
8. Tatiparthi
9. Vannepudi
10. Vijayanagaram

== See also ==
- List of mandals in Andhra Pradesh
