= Bikkavolu railway station =

Railway station in Andhra Pradesh, India

Bikkavolu
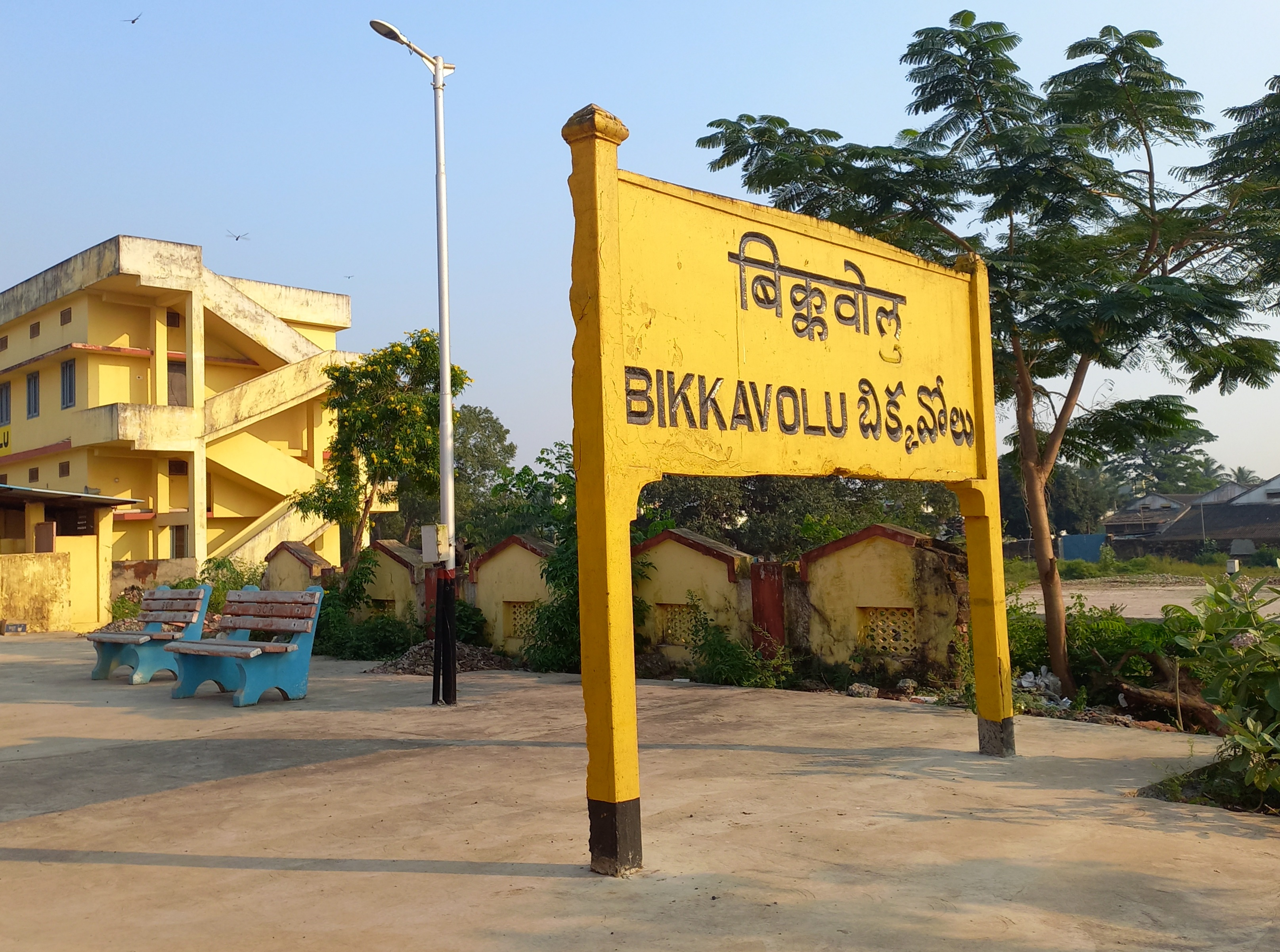
- Bikkavolu railway station signboard

General information
- Location: Bikkavolu, East Godavari district, Andhra Pradesh; India
- Coordinates: 16°58′09″N 82°01′55″E
- Elevation: 19 m (62 ft)
- System: Passenger train station
- Owner: Indian Railways
- Operator: South Coast Railway zone
- Line: Visakhapatnam–Vijayawada of Howrah–Chennai main line and
- Platforms: 2
- Tracks: 5 1,676 mm (5 ft 6 in)

Construction
- Structure type: Standard (on-ground station)
- Parking: Available

Other information
- Status: Functioning
- Station code: BVL
- Zone(s): South Coast Railway zone
- Division(s): Vijayawada

History
- Electrified: 25 kV AC 50 Hz OHLE
Location
- Location within India Location within Andhra Pradesh

Bikkavolu is an Indian Railways station at Bikkavolu, a village in East Godavari district of Andhra Pradesh. It lies on the Vijayawada–Chennai section and is administered under Vijayawada railway division of South Coast Railway zone. Eleven trains halt in this station every day. It is the 2140th-busiest station in the country.

== History ==
Between 1893 and 1896, 1,288 km (800 mi) of the East Coast State Railway, between Vijayawada and Cuttack was opened for traffic. The southern part of the East Coast State Railway (from Waltair to Vijayawada) was taken over by Madras Railway in 1901.

== Classification ==
In terms of earnings and outward passengers handled, Bikkavolu is categorized as a Non-Suburban Grade-6 (NSG-6) railway station. Based on the re–categorization of Indian Railway stations for the period of 2017–18 and 2022–23, an NSG–6 category station earns nearly ₹1 crore and handles close to 1 million passengers.

== Important persons ==
- Munta Phani Kumar
- Thatholu Veerababu
- Nelli Suresh

Preceding station	Indian Railways	Following station
Peddabrahmadevam towards Visakhapatnam	South Coast Railway zone Visakhapatnam–Vijayawada of Howrah–Chennai main line	Balabhadrapuram towards Vijayawada
