= Elamanchili railway station =

Railway station in Andhra Pradesh, India

Elamanchili
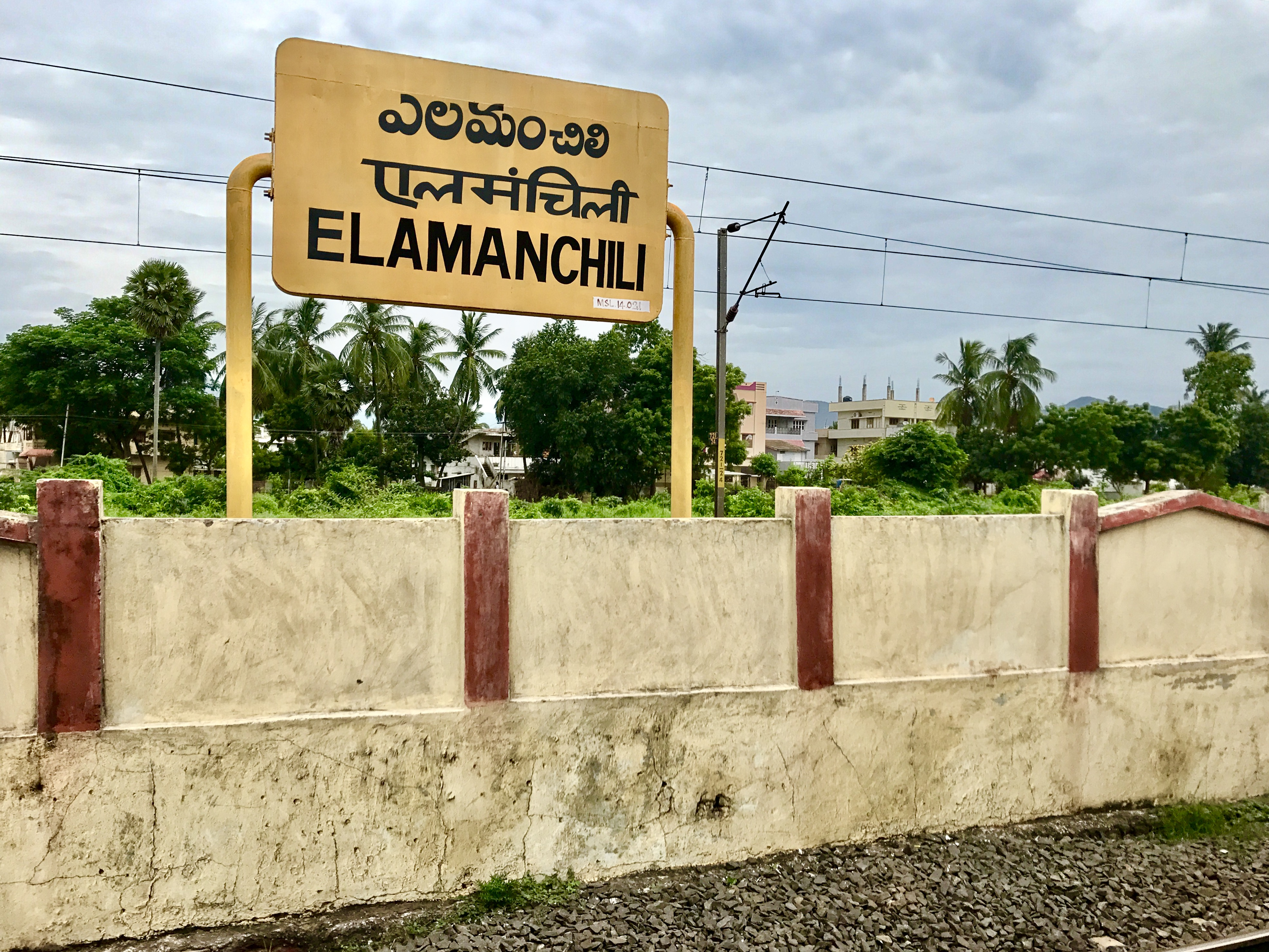
- Railway station signboard

General information
- Location: Elamanchili, Anakapalli district, Andhra Pradesh; India
- Coordinates: 17°33′13″N 82°51′10″E
- Elevation: 22 m (72 ft)
- System: Express train and Passenger train station
- Owner: Indian Railways
- Operator: South Coast Railway zone
- Line: Visakhapatnam–Vijayawada of Howrah–Chennai main line and
- Platforms: 2
- Tracks: 1,676 mm (5 ft 6 in)

Construction
- Structure type: Standard (on ground station)
- Parking: Available

Other information
- Status: Functioning
- Station code: YLM
- Zone(s): South Coast Railway zone
- Division(s): Vijayawada

History
- Electrified: 25 kV AC 50 Hz OHLE
Location
- Location within India Location within Andhra Pradesh

Elamanchili railway station (station code:YLM), is an Indian Railways station in Elamanchili, a municipality in Anakapalli district of Andhra Pradesh. It lies on the Vijayawada–Chennai section and is administered under Vijayawada railway division of South Coast Railway zone.

== History ==
Between 1893 and 1896, 1,288 km (800 mi) of the East Coast State Railway, between Vijayawada and Cuttack was opened for traffic. The southern part of the East Coast State Railway (from Waltair to Vijayawada) was taken over by Madras Railway in 1901.

== Classification ==
In terms of earnings and outward passengers handled, Elamanchili is categorized as a Non-Suburban Grade-5 (NSG-5) railway station. Based on the re–categorization of Indian Railway stations for the period of 2017–18 and 2022–23, an NSG–5 category station earns between ₹1–₹10 crore and handles 1–2 million passengers.

Preceding station	Indian Railways	Following station
Narasingapalli towards ?	South Coast Railway zone Visakhapatnam–Vijayawada of Howrah–Chennai main line	Regupalem towards ?
