= Golagam =

- Village
- Interactive map of Golagam
- Location in Andhra Pradesh, India Golagam (India)
- Coordinates: 17.685312°N 83.033435°E
- Country: India
- State: Andhra Pradesh
- District: Vizianagaram
- Mandal: Denkada

Population (2011)
  - Total: 3,082

Languages
  - Official: Telugu
- Time zone: UTC+05:30 (IST)
- Postal code: 531 001

Golagam is a village in Denkada mandal of Vizianagaram district of the Indian state of Andhra Pradesh. It is located at a distance of 1 km from gurla and at a distance of 1 km from vizayanagaram.

== Demographics ==
As of 2011 Census of India, Golagam had a population of 3082. The total population constitute, 1547 males and 1535 females with a sex ratio of 992 females per 1000 males. 346 children are in the age group of 0–6 years, with child sex ratio of 891 girls per 1000 boys. The average literacy rate stands at 58.74%.

== Transport ==
APSRTC runs buses from Anakapalle and Visakhapatnam to Golagam. Thadi and Anakapalle railway stations serve the village.
