= Durgada, Kakinada district =

Durgada
- Village
- Interactive map of Durgada
- Location in Andhra Pradesh, India Durgada (India)
- Coordinates: 17°12′54″N 82°20′36″E
- Country: India
- State: Andhra Pradesh
- District: Kakinada
- Mandal: Gollaprolu

Area
  - Total: 14.4 km^{2} (5.6 sq mi)

Population (2011)
  - Total: 10,717
  - Density: 744/km^{2} (1,930/sq mi)

Languages
  - Official: Telugu
- Time zone: UTC+5:30 (IST)
- PIN: 533449

Durgada, formerly Durga Ooda or Durga Vaahini, is a rural village in Gollaprolu Mandal, Kakinada district, Andhra Pradesh, India. It is located northeast of Pithapuram and Gollaprolu. The village is located 1.8 kilometers away from NH 214 and 3 kilometers away from NH 5. The nearest city (35 km) is Kakinada.

The village has rail access through a halt, and the nearest railway stations are Ravikampadu East Godavari (2.6 km) and Gollaprolu (9.2 km). The nearest railway junction is Samalkot. The nearest airstrip is Madhurapudi, Rajahmundry (75 km) and the nearest airport is Vishakapatnam (125 km). The nearest seaport is Kakinada Port.

== Transport ==
Roadways

There was once an APSRTC bus facility, but it was removed. The people depend on Autorikshas as their primary form of transportation.

Railways

There is a railway gate halt in the village. There are 2 passenger trains available every day. Of these two, one heads towards Vishakapatnam while the other heads towards Samalkot Junction.

== History ==
It is unknown when the village was built, but Pullakavi, a famous author, lived in Durgada in the 15th century. There are some monuments and buildings that show the signs of British colonial rule. it was under the rule of Rao Venkata Kumara Mahipati Surya Rau Maharaja of Pithapuram for a period of time.

== Demographics ==
As of the census of 2011, there are 10,717 people residing in the village. The population density was 740 people per square kilometer (1,900 people/mi^{2}). There were 3075 households within the village. Males constitute 50.1% of the population and females 49.9%. Durgada has an average literacy rate of 53%, substantially lower than the national average of 74%. Male literacy is at 28.1%, while female literacy is 24.9%. In Durgada, 11.1% of the population is age 6 or under.

== Economy ==
Most of the villagers are small and marginal farmers having less than 5 acres of agricultural land. Fewer people are engaged in other works such as mango pickle manufacturing and gold selling. Others work in railways, banking, software, and education.

== Caste profile ==
Most castes are found here. About half of the people are Kapu, and Schedule castes constitute 12% of the population.

== Crops ==
As there is no irrigation by rivers or canals, people depend on groundwater irrigation. The people in the village cultivate less water-consuming crops. Some crops farmed include onion, mango, papaya, ground nuts, and various vegetables. Most of the people will cultivate two crops per year such onions during kharif crop and sesame or watermelon during Rabi or some other vegetable crops.
