= Hamsavaram railway station =

Railway station in Andhra Pradesh, India

Hamsavaram
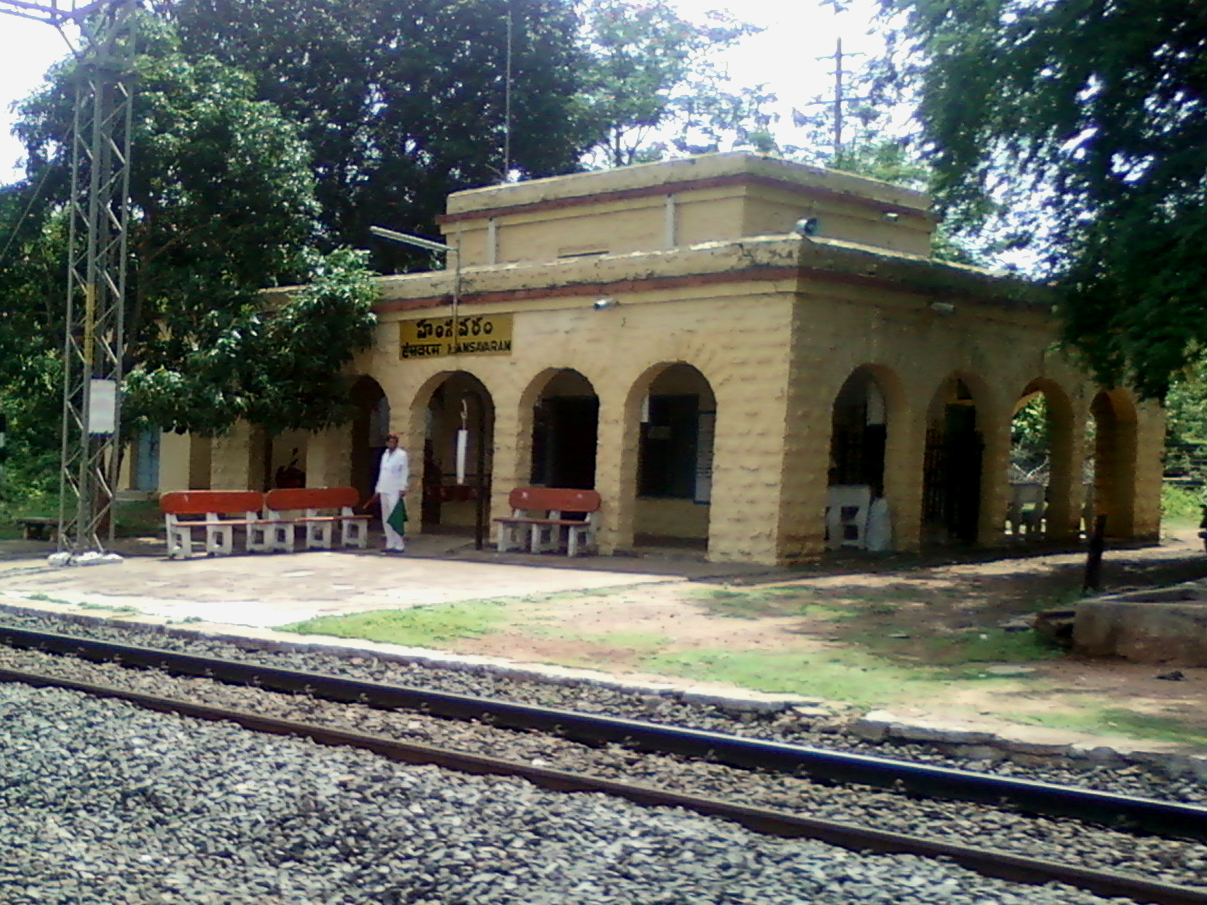

General information
- Location: Hamsavaram, Andhra Pradesh; India
- Coordinates: 17°18′58″N 82°29′22″E
- Elevation: 24 m (79 ft)
- System: Passenger train station
- Line: Visakhapatnam–Vijayawada section of Howrah–Chennai main line
- Platforms: 2 side platform
- Tracks: 2 5 ft 6 in (1,676 mm) broad gauge

Construction
- Structure type: Standard (on-ground station)
- Parking: Available

Other information
- Status: Functioning
- Station code: HVM
- Zone(s): South Coast Railway
- Division(s): Vijayawada
Location
- Location within Andhra Pradesh

Hamsavaram railway station (station code:HVM), is an Indian Railways station in Hamsavaram of Kakinada district in the Indian state of Andhra Pradesh. It lies on the Howrah–Chennai main line. It is administered under Vijayawada railway division of South Coast Railway zone. It is 3378th most busiest railway station in India It halts 8 trains every day.

== History ==
Between 1893 and 1896, 1,288 km (800 mi) of the East Coast State Railway, between Vijayawada and Cuttack was opened for traffic. The southern part of the East Coast State Railway (from Waltair to Vijayawada) was taken over by Madras Railway in 1901.

== Classification ==
In terms of earnings and outward passengers handled, Hamsavaram is categorized as a Non-Suburban Grade-6 (NSG-6) railway station. Based on the re–categorization of Indian Railway stations for the period of 2017–18 and 2022–23, an NSG–6 category station earns nearly ₹1 crore and handles close to 1 million passengers.

| Preceding station | Indian Railways | Following station |
|---|---|---|
| Tuni towards Visakhapatnam | South Central Railway zone Visakhapatnam–Vijayawada section of Howrah–Chennai main line | Timmapuram towards Vijayawada |
