= Balabhadrapuram railway station =

Railway station in Andhra Pradesh, India

Balabhadrapuram

General information
- Location: Balabhadrapuram, East Godavari district, Andhra Pradesh; India
- Coordinates: 16°57′59″N 82°00′02″E
- Elevation: 23 m (75 ft)
- System: Passenger train station
- Owner: Indian Railways
- Operator: South Coast Railway zone
- Line: Visakhapatnam–Vijayawada section of Howrah–Chennai main line and
- Platforms: 3
- Tracks: 4 1,676 mm (5 ft 6 in)

Construction
- Structure type: Standard (on-ground station)
- Parking: Available

Other information
- Status: Functioning
- Station code: BBPM
- Zone(s): South Coast Railway zone
- Division(s): Vijayawada

History
- Electrified: 25 kV AC 50 Hz OHLE
Location
- Location within India Location within Andhra Pradesh

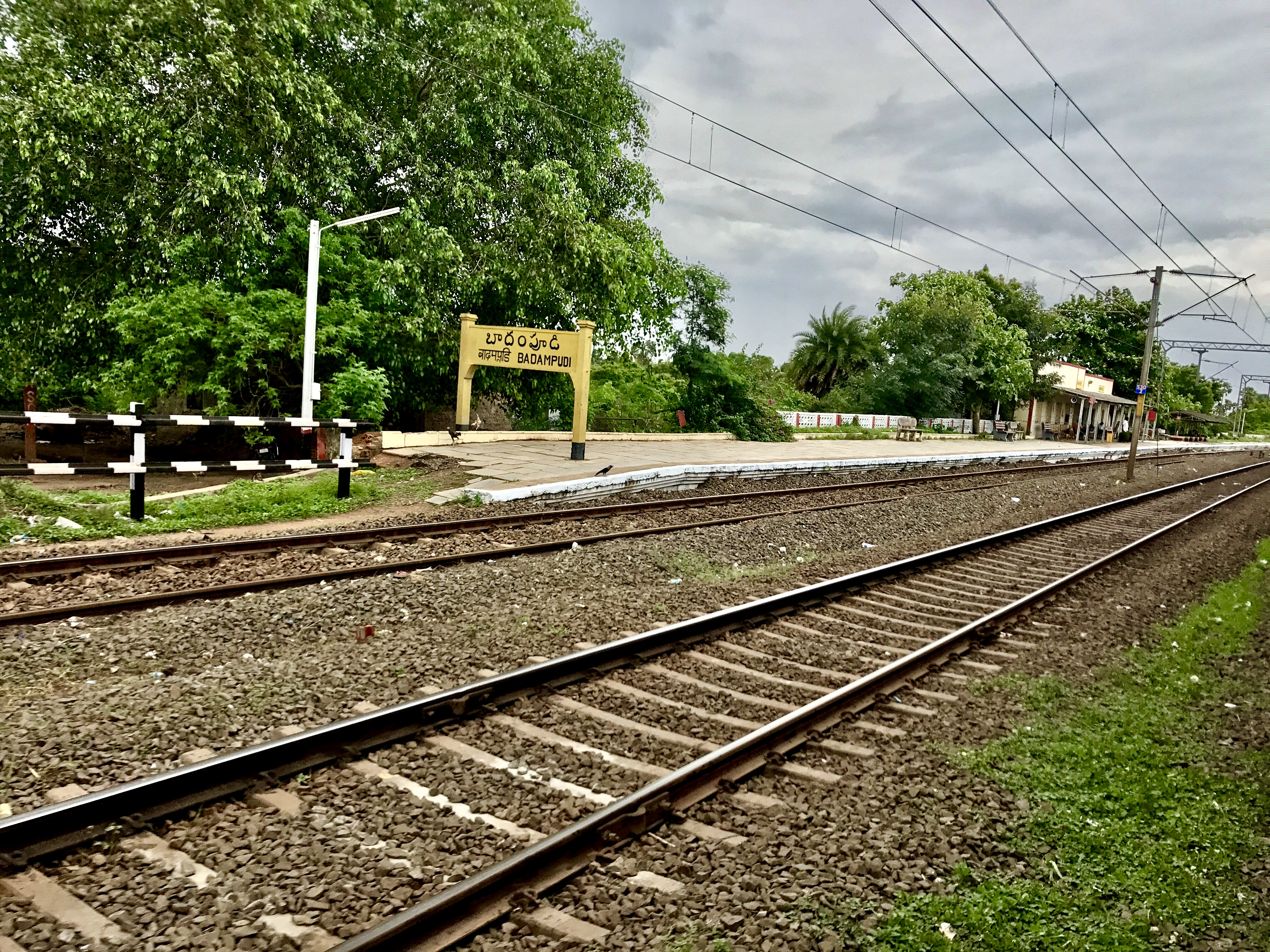
Badampudi railway station board

Balabhadrapuram is an Indian Railways station in Balabhadrapuram, a village in East Godavari district of Andhra Pradesh. It lies on the Vijayawada–Chennai section and is administered under Vijayawada railway division of South Coast Railway zone. Six trains halt in this station every day. It is the 3049th-busiest station in the country.

== History ==
Between 1893 and 1896, 1,288 km (800 mi) of the East Coast State Railway, between Vijayawada and Cuttack was opened for traffic. The southern part of the East Coast State Railway (from Waltair to Vijayawada) was taken over by Madras Railway in 1901.

Preceding station	Indian Railways	Following station
Bikkavolu towards Visakhapatnam	South Coast Railway zone Visakhapatnam–Vijayawada section of Howrah–Chennai main line	Anaparti towards Vijayawada
