= Thadi railway station =

Railway station in Andhra Pradesh, India

Thadi
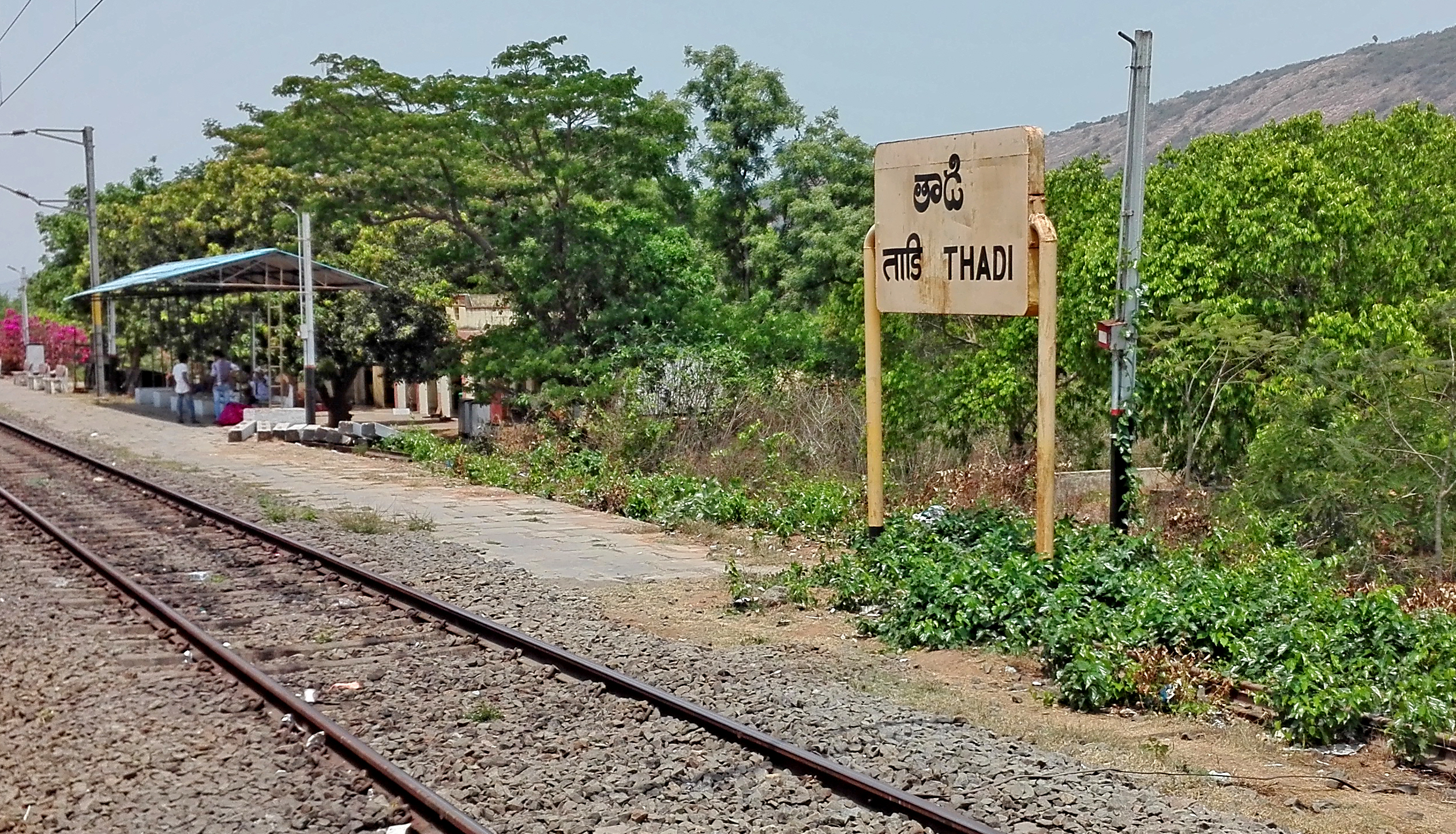

General information
- Location: Thadi, Visakhapatnam, Andhra Pradesh; India
- Coordinates: 17°41′10″N 83°04′01″E
- Elevation: 35 m (115 ft)
- System: Indian Railways station
- Line: Visakhapatnam–Vijayawada section of Howrah–Chennai main line
- Platforms: 2
- Tracks: 5 ft 6 in (1,676 mm) broad gauge

Construction
- Structure type: Standard (on-ground station)
- Parking: Not available

Other information
- Status: Functioning
- Station code: THY
- Zone(s): South Coast Railway
- Division(s): Visakhapatnam

Services
Preceding station	Indian Railways	Following station
Duvvada towards ?	South Coast Railway zone Visakhapatnam–Vijayawada section of Howrah–Chennai main line	Anakapalle towards ?
Location
- Location within Visakhapatnam

Thadi railway station (station code: THY), located in the Indian state of Andhra Pradesh, serves Golagam and Thadi villages from Anakapalle mandal in Anakapalli district. It lies in Howrah–Chennai main line. It is 10 km from Duvvada and 6 km from Anakapalle.

== History ==
Between 1893 and 1896, 1,288 km (800 mi) of the East Coast State Railway was opened for traffic. In 1898–99, Bengal Nagpur Railway was linked to the lines in southern India.

Visakhapatnam Steel Plant was established in the 1980s and the first coke oven battery was commissioned in 1989.

== Classification ==
In terms of earnings and outward passengers handled, Thadi is categorized as a Non-Suburban Grade-6 (NSG-6) railway station. Based on the re–categorization of Indian Railway stations for the period of 2017–18 and 2022–23, an NSG–6 category station earns nearly ₹1 crore and handles close to 1 million passengers.

== See also ==
- List of railway stations in India
