= Tatiparthi =

Tatiparthi Weaving tradition
- Village
- Nickname: paddy village
- Interactive map of Tatiparthi
- Location in Andhra Pradesh, India
- Coordinates: 17.176880°N 82.2756600°E
- Country: India
- State: Andhra Pradesh
- District: Kakinada district
- Established: 1692
- Founder: Saliyar
- Named for: Textile village
- Talukas: Gollaprolu Mandal
  - Rank: 1ST

Population (2011)
  - Total: 9,875

Languages
  - Official: Telugu
- Time zone: UTC+5:30 (IST)
- PIN: 533445
- Vehicle registration: AP31

Tatiparthi is a village in Gollaprolu Mandal, located in Kakinada district of the Indian state of Andhra Pradesh. with agriculture and weaving as major occupations. The name 'Tatiparthi' is made up of two words, 'Tati' and 'Parthi' that translate to 'Palm' and 'Cotton' in English. Palm trees are found in large number around this place. Agriculture is one of the main occupation of the Villagers with Rice, Cotton, Sugarcone and Corn being the important crops grown here.

The village is well known for its traditions, festivals and temples. The village has a famous temple of Goddess Gajjalamma, who is also the 'Graama Devata'. The temple is said to be 300 years old. The village also has a temple for Lord Subrahmanyeswara Swamy. Both temples are well known for their annual celebrations known as 'Gajjalamma Teertham' and 'Subrahmanya Shashti'. A temple dedicated to Aparna Devi is also located here. The goddess is revered by many people in the vicinity of Tatiparthi.

In recent years, it has been famous for various types of Sarees woven by local artisans and available at cheaper prices. Padmashali is a weaver community most popular to produce large amount of sarees. Nearly 5000 weavers situated here. They manufacture different kind of sarees like Jamdhani, Pure pattu, cotton sarees etc.

How to reach:

- Nearest Bus Stand is 8 km away at Pithapuram from where one can reach Tatiparthi via Auto.
- Nearest Major Railway Station is 20 km away Samarlakota, which is situated on the main line between Chennai and Howrah.
- Nearest Airport is at Rajahmundry, approx 80 km from the village.

== Climate ==
The climate is dry and moderate throughout the year. The hottest part of the year is between April and mid June with maximum temperatures around 38–42 °C (100–108 °F). The coolest part of the year is January, with minimum temperatures around 18–20 °C (64–68 °F). The city gets most of its seasonal rainfall from the south-west monsoon winds although a good deal of rains greet these parts during the northeast monsoon from mid-October to mid-December. Depressions/cyclones in the Bay of Bengal causes heavy rain falls and thunderstorms.
