= Narsipatnam Road railway station =

Railway station in Andhra Pradesh, India

Narsipatnam Road

General information
- Location: Narsipatnam, Anakapalli district, Andhra Pradesh; India
- Coordinates: 17°27′08″N 82°43′27″E
- Elevation: 23 m (75 ft)
- System: Express train and Passenger train station
- Owner: Indian Railways
- Operator: South Central Railway zone
- Line: Visakhapatnam–Vijayawada of Howrah–Chennai main line and
- Platforms: 2
- Tracks: 1,676 mm (5 ft 6 in)

Construction
- Structure type: Standard (on ground station)
- Parking: Available

Other information
- Status: Functioning
- Station code: NRP
- Zone(s): South Central Railway zone
- Division(s): Vijayawada

History
- Electrified: 25 kV AC 50 Hz OHLE
Location
- Location within Andhra Pradesh

Narsipatnam Road railway station (station code:NRP), is an Indian Railways station in Anakapalli district of Andhra Pradesh. It is situated on Vijayawada–Gudur section of Howrah–Chennai main line and is administered under Vijayawada railway division of South Central Railway zone. It is the 152nd most busiest railway station in India.

== History ==
Between 1893 and 1896, 1,288 km (800 mi) of the East Coast State Railway, between Vijayawada and Cuttack was opened for traffic. The southern part of the East Coast State Railway (from Waltair to Vijayawada) was taken over by Madras Railway in 1901.

== Classification ==
In terms of earnings and outward passengers handled, Narsipatnam Road is categorized as a Non-Suburban Grade-5 (NSG-5) railway station. Based on the re–categorization of Indian Railway stations for the period of 2017–18 and 2022–23, an NSG–5 category station earns between ₹1–₹10 crore and handles 1–2 million passengers.

== Station amenities ==
It is one of the 38 stations in the division to be equipped with Automatic Ticket Vending Machines (ATVMs).

Preceding station	Indian Railways	Following station
Regupalem towards ?	South Central Railway zone Visakhapatnam–Vijayawada of Howrah–Chennai main line	Gullipadu towards ?
