= Regupalem =

- Village
- Interactive map of Regupalem
- Location in Andhra Pradesh, India
- Coordinates: 17.503637°N 82.792949°E
- Country: India
- State: Andhra Pradesh
- District: Anakapalli

Population
  - Total: 4,960

Languages
  - Official: Telugu
- Time zone: UTC+5:30 (IST)
- PIN: 531055
- Telephone code: 08931
- Vehicle registration: AP31

Regupalem is a village in Anakapalli district in the state of Andhra Pradesh in India.

== Demographics ==
As of Census 2011 the town has population of 4,960 of which 2431 are males and 2529 are females. Average Sex Ratio is of 1040 against state average of 993. Population of Children with age of 0-6 is 457 which is 9.21% of total population of Regupalem. Child Sex Ratio in the town is around 1031 compared to Andhra Pradesh state average of 939. Literacy rate of Regupalem town is 67.58% lower than state average of 67.02%.
