= Tuni railway station, Andhra Pradesh =

Railway station in Andhra Pradesh, India

Tuni railway station
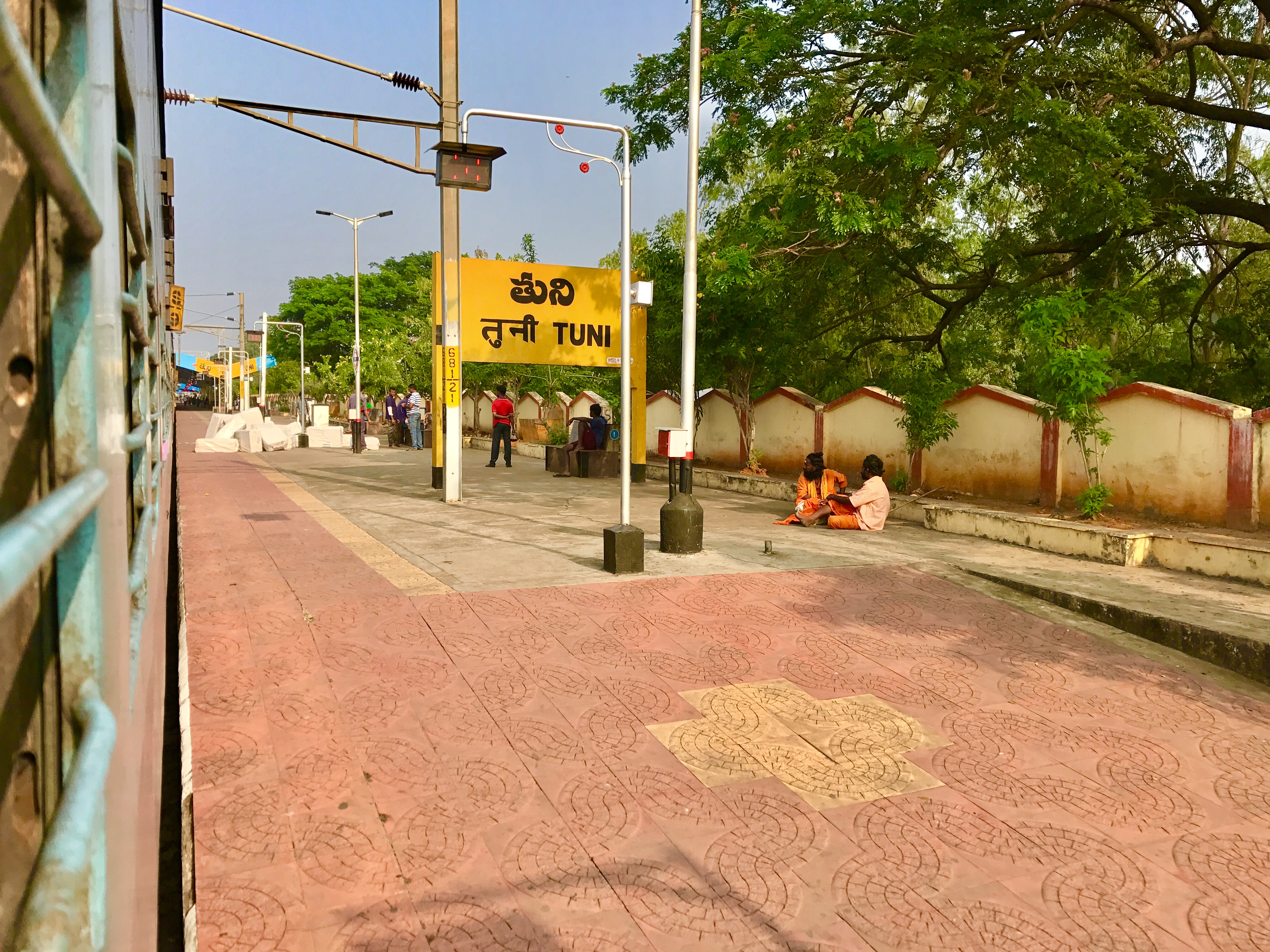

General information
- Location: Tuni, Andhra Pradesh; India
- Coordinates: 17°21′39″N 82°32′33″E
- Elevation: 24 m (79 ft)
- System: Indian Railway station
- Owner: Indian Railways
- Operator: Indian Railways
- Line: Visakhapatnam–Vijayawada section of Howrah–Chennai main line
- Platforms: 2 side platform
- Tracks: 3 5 ft 6 in (1,676 mm) broad gauge
- Connections: Bus stand, Auto, Taxi stand

Construction
- Structure type: Standard (on ground station)
- Parking: Available
- Cycle facilities: Yes
- Accessible: Available

Other information
- Status: Functioning
- Station code: TUNI
- Zone(s): South Central Railway
- Division(s): Vijayawada
- Classification: Non-Suburban Grade-3 (NSG-3)

History
- Opened: 1899
- Electrified: 1980-1981
Location
- Location within Andhra Pradesh Location within India

Tuni railway station (station code:TUNI) is an Indian Railways station in Tuni City of Kakinada district in the Indian state of Andhra Pradesh. It lies on the Howrah–Chennai main line. It is administered under Vijayawada railway division of South Coast Railway zone (formerly South Central Railway zone). It is one of the 38 stations in the division to be equipped with Automatic Ticket Vending Machines (ATVMs).

== History ==
Between 1893 and 1896, 1,288 km (800 mi) of the East Coast State Railway, between Vijayawada and Cuttack was opened for traffic. The southern part of the East Coast State Railway (from Waltair to Vijayawada) was taken over by Madras Railway in 1901.

== Classification ==
In terms of earnings and outward passengers handled, Tuni is categorized as a Non-Suburban Grade-3 (NSG-3) railway station. Based on the re–categorization of Indian Railway stations for the period of 2017–18 and 2022–23, an NSG–3 category station earns between ₹20–₹50 crore and handles 3–10 million passengers.

| Preceding station | Indian Railways | Following station |
|---|---|---|
| Gullipadu towards ? | South Central Railway zone Visakhapatnam–Vijayawada section of Howrah–Chennai main line | Hamsavaram towards ? |
