= Chebrolu, Kakinada district =

Chebrolu
- Village
- Interactive map of Chebrolu
- Location in Andhra Pradesh, India Chebrolu (India)
- Coordinates: 17.195653°N 82.315922°E
- Country: India
- State: Andhra Pradesh
- District: Kakinada
- Talukas: Gollaprolu

Population (2011)
  - Total: 14,912

Languages
  - Official: Telugu
- Time zone: UTC+5:30 (IST)
- PIN: 533449
- Telephone code: 08869

Chebrolu is a village in Gollaprolu Mandal in Kakinada district of Andhra Pradesh, India.

The village is known for the Seetharama temple and its festival in Srirama Navami used to done for 7 days from Navami.

The village is also known for Seri Culture Cultivation, more than 60% farming is basically on seri culture.

The village is biggest major panchayat in Gollaprolu Mandal.

Various private schools, Government high school and women's intermediate college and Polytechnic, Engineering, MTech & MBA college Namely Adarsh College of engineering are available in the village.

One IPS, 2 Group -2 officers, doctors, government teachers, central and state government employees, railway employees, bankers, police department, software employees, upcoming entrepreneurs and most important, the backbone of the country, farmers.
