= Gollaprolu =

- Town
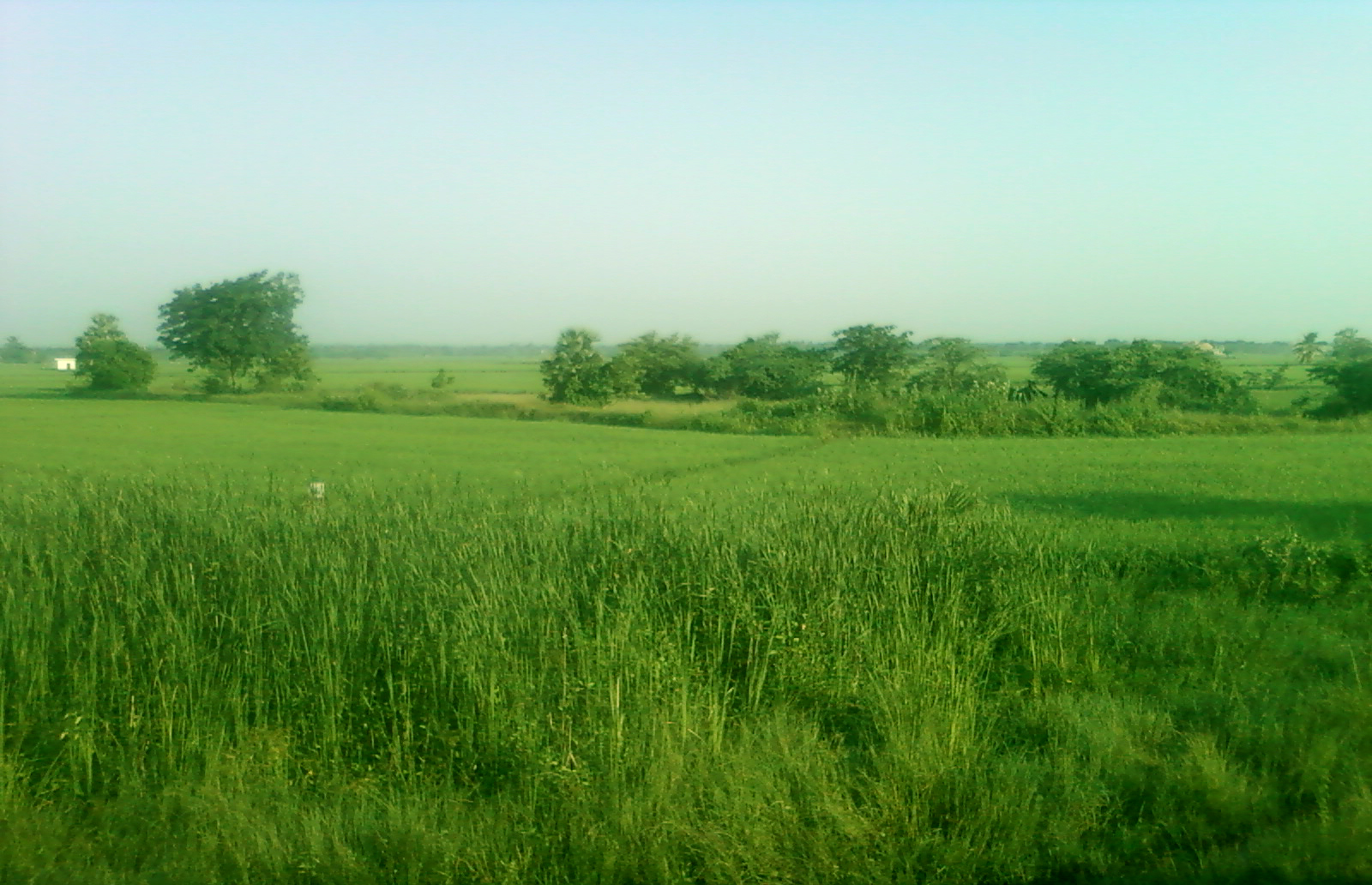
- Fields between Pithapuram and Gollaprolu

- Location in Andhra Pradesh, India
- Coordinates: 17.1672°N 82.2847°E
- Country: India
- State: Andhra Pradesh
- District: Kakinada
- Talukas: Gollaprolu

Government
  - Type: Urban local body
  - Body: Gollaprolu municipal council

Area
  - Total: 7.10 km^{2} (2.74 sq mi)

Population (2011)
  - Total: 35,768
  - Rank: 102
  - Density: 5,040/km^{2} (13,000/sq mi)

Languages
  - Official: Telugu
- Time zone: UTC+5:30 (IST)
- PIN: 533445
- Telephone code: +91–8869
- Vehicle Registration: AP05 (Former); AP39 (from 30 January 2019)
- Website: gollaprolu.cdma.ap.gov.in

Gollaprolu is a town in Kakinada district of the Indian state of Andhra Pradesh. It is a Municipality in Gollaprolu mandal of Kakinada revenue division. Business is the main occupation of this town. The town also forms a part of Pithapuram Area Development Authority & Kakinada Urban Development Authority.

== Geography ==
The region is cyclone-prone with agricultural dependant. The villagers are known for growing one of the most sought after varieties of hot pepper and is famous for the production of onions, ground nuts, cotton and rice.

== Governance ==
The town was upgraded from Nagara panchayat to 3rd grade Municipality on 07 April 2026. Gollaprolu Municipal Council is the governing body responsible for town.

== Transport ==
Gollaprolu is located on National Highway 216.Gollaprolu Railway Station is located on Howrah-Chennai main line. Rajahmundry Airport is 60km from the town.

== Education ==
Sri Seth Peraji Lumbaji Zilla Parishat High School
