= East Coast State Railway =

Railway company operating in India

Overview
- Locale: British India
- Dates of operation: 1890–1902
- Successor: Madras Railway (southern section); Bengal Nagpur Railway (northern section)

Technical
- Track gauge: 5 ft 6 in (1,676 mm)
- Length: 1,287 km (800 mi)

The East Coast State Railway was a guaranteed railway company formed in 1890 that operated in British India. Following a brief existence, its southern section (from Waltair to Vijayawada) was taken over by the Madras Railway in 1901, while the northern section was merged into the Bengal Nagpur Railway in 1902.

Between 1893 and 1896, 1,287 km (800 mi) of the railway from Vijayawada to Cuttack was constructed and opened to traffic, including a branch line to Puri.
