= Narayangarh =

Narayangarh may refer to:

- Narayangarh, Chitwan, a city in Nepal
- Naraingarh or Narayangarh, a city in Haryana, India
  - Naraingarh (Vidhan Sabha constituency)
- Narayangarh, Mandsaur, a town in Madhya Pradesh, India
- Narayangarh, Paschim Medinipur, a village in Paschim Medinipur, West Bengal, India
  - Narayangarh railway station
- Narayangarh (community development block), a division in Paschim Medinipur district in West Bengal, India
- Narayangarh (Vidhan Sabha constituency), an assembly constituency in West Bengal, India
