= Nekurseni =

Town in West Bengal, India

Nekurseni is a small town in Paschim Medinipur District of West Bengal, India located approximately 50 km south of Kharagpur. Nekurseni is an ancient town dating back to the era of Ashoka. Nekurseni is named after the wife of the fabled giant Nekursena. The NH 60, familiar as O. T. Road before has connected this town to the rest part of India.

Nekurseni railway station is administrative control of South Eastern Railway. Nearby two stations are Belda and Dantan. Nearby railhead junction station is Khargapur.

== Geography ==
Nekurseni is located at 21.92475°N 87.27965°E. The gram panchayats Ranisarai-8 located in the Narayangarh community development block in the Kharagpur subdivision of the Paschim Medinipur district.

== Culture and festival ==
Inspired by Bengali Cultures. Most famous festivals are Durga Puja, Kali Puja, Saraswati Puja, Diwali and another one.

== Going to Nekurseni ==
=== From Kolkata ===
- By train: It's 162 km from Howrah via Khargapur, previous station is Belda.
- By Bus: It's too hard to go through Bus.

Local Trains from Khargapur are frequently available which stops at Nekurseni. Starting from morning 6.30 am at Khargapur, there are 4 trains to Nekurseni till 6 pm.

=== From Kharagpur or Midnapore ===
Take a bus to Sonakonia from Khargapur or Midnapore. From Kharagpur it takes about 60 min. Mainly two Bus stands - Nekurseni School Nekurseni Bazar

=== From Dantan or Sonakonia ===
Take a bus to Contai or Midnapore from Sonakonia or Dantan. From Dantan it takes about 15 minute.

== Schools ==
- Nekurseni Vivekananda Vidyabhaban
- Nekurseni Primary School
