= List of Indian tornadoes =

List of tornadoes in the country of India

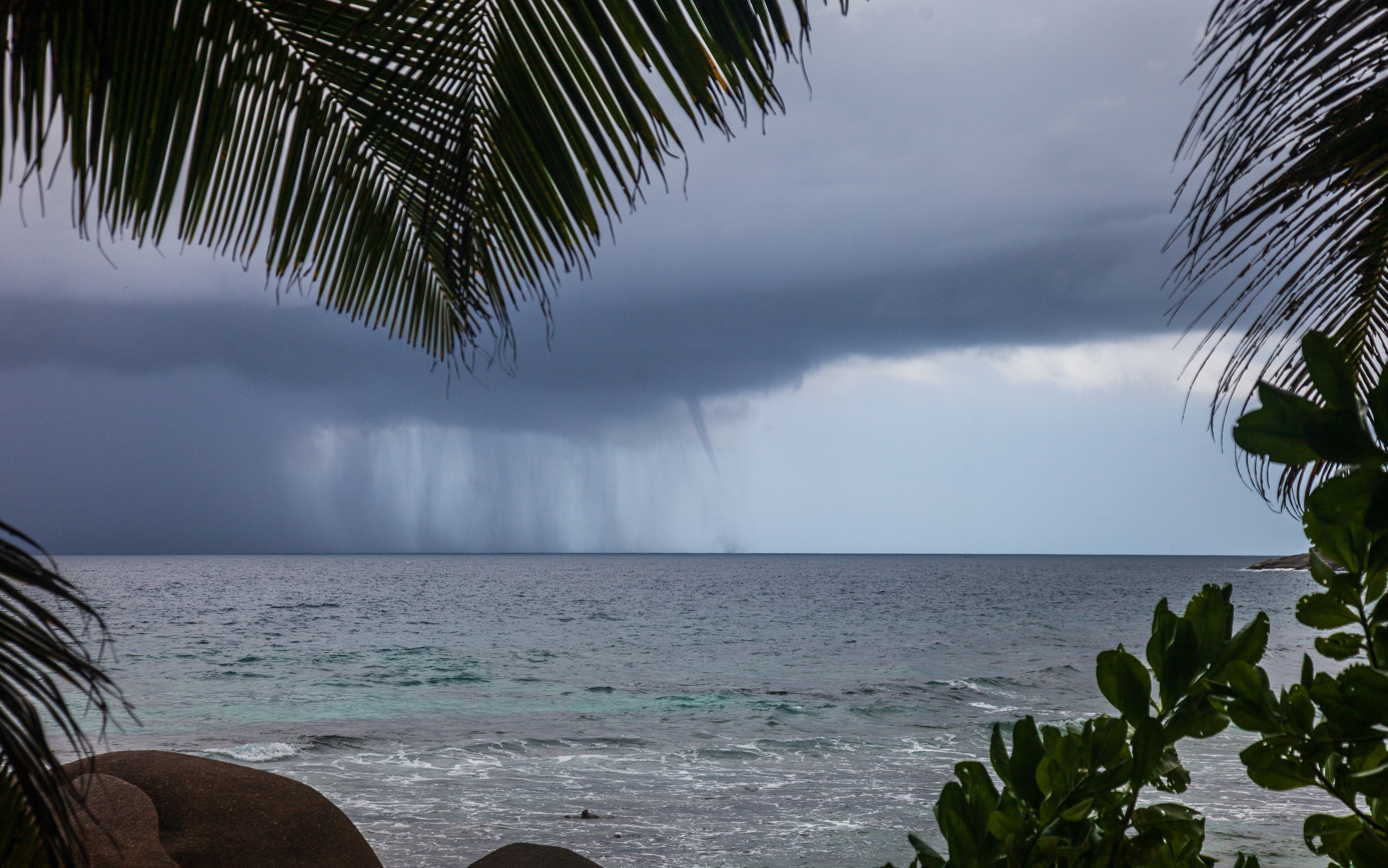
A waterspout in the Indian Ocean

Tornadoes in India are rare, with only ~12 tornadoes being recorded between 1976 and 2010 (only officially, most go unreported). Most tornadoes in India are deadly, with an average of 80 people killed per tornado. The deadliest Indian tornado on record hit areas near Belda on March 24, 1998, killing 250 people.

== Events ==
=== Pre-1950s ===
FU	F0	F1	F2	F3	F4	F5
5	0	0	0	0	0	1

- April 8, 1838 – A long-tracked and destructive unofficially estimated F5 tornado tore through downtown Kolkata, damaging numerous structures and killing 215.
- May 1, 1865 – A strong FU tornado tracks through rural areas west of Pandua, taking an extremely unusual sharp-turned path and killing 20 people.
- April 27, 1888 – A relatively brief FU tornado moves through Serampore, killing 7 people.
- March 13, 1921 – A violent tornado struck Barisal, West Bengal and caused significant damage to property and infrastructure. Homes were razed, trees were uprooted and many person were killed or injured.
- June 30, 1936 – A "terrific cyclone" in North Malabar affected a large swath of area, causing 2 thousand crore in damage before dissipating.
- March 2, 1942 – A tornado occurred in Burdwan

=== 1950s ===
- March 20, 1951 – A brief and extremely weak FU tornado touches down in the outskirts of Sherpur, causing no damage.

=== 1960s ===
- April 19, 1963 – On April 19, 1963, a tornado impacted Cooch Behar district in North Bengal and the adjacent Goalpara district in North Assam, India. The tornado's path spanned 36 kilometres and had a funnel diameter of 100–130 meters, rotating anticlockwise.
- March 21, 1969 – A weak FU tornado tracks through areas near Ushti, causing little damage and no fatalities.

=== 1970s ===
- April 7, 1977 – A brief FU tornado tracks through rural Palashipara, killing 2 people.
- April 15, 1977 – An FU tornado affects areas north of Contai, killing 10.
- March 18, 1978 – A freak tornado hit the university campus area in New Delhi killing at least 28 people and injuring over 700 others, about 100 of them seriously.
- April 16th-18th, 1978 – A small but deadly tornado outbreak hit Northern Odisha and Southern West Bengal. It had 3 tornadoes and all had ≥100 fatalities.
  - April 16, 1978 – A brief but extremely powerful FU tornado touches down west of Bhadrak, in Purana Bandgoda, killing 141-150, though some say the number is as high as 178. It's estimated windspeeds are 150-200 km/h, making it a mid/high-end EF1 to mid-end EF2.
  - April 17, 1978 – 100 people were killed and more than 500 injured as a tornado battered Ramachandrapur in the administrative district of Keonjhar, Orissa.
  - April 18, 1978 – a FU tornado hit Karimpur in Nadia district and went on to Murshidabad district. 128 deaths were reported.

=== 1980s ===
- April 17, 1981 – A strong FU tornado tracks through populated areas east of Kendujhar, reaching a maximum width of 997 meters and killing ~120.
- April 12, 1983 – A brief but powerful FU tornado touches down in rural areas surrounding Kanchrapara, destroying crops and other structures in its path. The tornado is estimated to have killed 50 people.

=== 1990s ===
- April 9, 1993 – An F2 tornado tracks through densely populated areas south of Berhampore, killing 145 and injuring an unknown number of people.
- March 24, 1998 – A relatively strong but brief tornado inflicts F2 damage to areas outside of Belda, inflicting damage to buildings and killing 250 people.

=== 2000s ===
- October 9, 2003 – An FU tornado caused damage to several buildings and injured several people when it went through the 3 villages of Harahari, Chhamugram and Manigram in Murshidabad district. It lasted 5 minutes and occurred at 10 am local time.
- August 15, 2007 – An EF0 tornado was spotted close to Sahanewal Airport and damaged standing crops, uprooted trees and blew off the roof of a tube well.
- March 31, 2009 – An EF3+ tornado destroyed 300 homes in Rajkanika and 11 other villages in Kendrapada District. There were about 20 casualties and 150 injured.

=== 2010s ===
- April 15, 2010 – 128 were killed by EFU tornado in Bihar caused by a Nor' Wester.
- May 16, 2012 – An EFU tornadic waterspout formed on the Godavari River in Dummugudem mandel in Andhra Pradesh (in present-day Telangana). The tornado lasted 10–15 minutes and sucked out many fish from the water. No injuries were caused by it.
- August 26, 2013 – An EFU tornado ripped off at least 40 feet of the roof of the terminal building of Ranchi Airport. It lasted 15 minutes and caused no injuries.
- April 2, 2015 – A dark and dusty EFU tornado in Bikaner, Rajasthan displaced 50 families and ripped off trees and power lines.
- May 31, 2017 – A sudden tornado impacted Chagharia and a few other villages in Kendrapada District. 30 thatched houses were damaged, trees were uprooted and 5 people were injured.
- October 12, 2018 – A Multi-Vortex tornado hit Kharagpur, West Bengal and snapped power lines, downed trees, and caused significant damage to homes. There was a lot of footage of the tornado destroying trees and houses, most of it was posted on Facebook. The tornado was caused by Cyclone Titli.
- February 7, 2019 – A large tornado struck Faridabad, Haryana, a satellite city of New Delhi (India's Capital), causing downed trees, roof damage and some other Major damage. Along with the tornado, New Delhi, Faridabad and nearby cities, towns and villages, were hit by a hailstorm which caused 40 injuries, and also a rainstorm which caused New Delhi to get 30 millimetres of rain, which is more than the average 22 millimeters of rain New Delhi gets in the month of February.
- October 1, 2019 – A very likely tornado touched down in Talod, Sabarkantha District, Gujarat and caused light damage to cotton and peanut plants. There are only a few videos of the Tornado and several news channels said it was 'Tornado-like cloud' even though it was rotating and had some debris flying around it.

=== 2020s ===
- June 15, 2020 – A tornado touched down in the Kendrapara District of Odisha and caused damage to 70 thatched houses in the villages of Talchua, Tikayat Nagar, RajendraNagar, Baghamari, Giria Pahi, Garta and Banipal in Rajnagar Block. It was on the ground for 5 to 10 minutes and caused 12 injuries. Kendrapara District Collector Samarth Verma said that the wind speed of the tornado was probably more than 100 kmph (60 mi/h)
- May 25–26, 2021 – Three tornadoes were spawned by the outer bands of Cyclone Yaas in the districts of North 24 Paragana and Hooghly, as part of a small tornado outbreak consisting of only them. One tornado was reported in Halishar with another reported in Chinsurah. Two people died with five injured, and 80 houses were damaged. Damage to trees and some businesses occurred as well. On May 26, Another tornado was spotted in Mahakalapada, Kendrapada District.
- May 7, 2022 – On May 7, A tornadic waterspout that formed on the Brahmaputra river caused significant damage to several huts in Barpeta, Assam at 10:20 a.m local time. No deaths or injuries were reported. It occurred during Severe Cyclonic Storm Asani.
- March 24, 2023 – A large cone tornado struck Fazilka in India on March 24, causing significant damage. At least 50 un-reinforced masonry homes were severely damaged or destroyed. Farming equipment was tossed, trees were snapped or uprooted, power poles were downed, and there was significant crop damage in farm fields. At least 12 people were injured.
- July 2, 2023 – On July 2, a tornado struck Rajkania block in Kendrapada District, Odisha and caused light damage to few huts in the villages of Talchua and RajendraNager.
- March 2, 2024 – A tornado touched down near Moga, Punjab, causing significant damage.
- March 31, 2024 – A tornado, accompanied by a nor'wester, struck the city of Jalpaiguri, West Bengal, killing five people and injuring over 100 others. More than 100 houses were destroyed by the tornado.
- March 15, 2026 – An EF2 tornado, which was formed by a nor'wester, struck the Mayurbhanj district of Odisha. The tornado killed 2 and injured 29 people.
- April 11, 2026 - A rare tornado touched down in rural land during scattered afternoon thundershowers near Devipur in Akhnoor, Jammu and Kashmir. No damage or casualties were reported.
- June 21, 2026 - An EF1 landspout touched down at Thoothukudi airport in the state of Tamil Nadu. It hit an amusement park, injuring 6 and destroying nearly 200 homes and leveling a village and part of the town along with the airport.
- September 23, 2026 – In the evening, the revenue village of Morampalli Banjar, in the Burgampadu mandel, Telangana was hit by a possible tornado. Lots of wind carrying along with it dust and rain slammed into the village, leaving a tornado-like trail of destruction. Trees were uprooted, snapped electricity poles etc. It injured a local fruit vender and a few others. It was reported as a gale-force squall or storm/windstorm or powerful/squally winds officially but was very likely a tornado.

== Bibliography ==
- Dewan, Ashraf; Finch, Jonathon (July 8, 2024). "Bengal Tornadoes". Bangladesh and East India Tornadoes Background Information.
