= Belda College =

College in West Bengal

- Type: Undergraduate college Public college
- Established: 1963; 63 years ago
- Affiliations: Vidyasagar University
- Principal: Dr. Chandrasekhar Hajra
- Location: Belda, West Bengal, 721424, India; 22.0753023°N 87.3296615°E
- Campus: Urban
- Website: Belda College

Belda College is a co-educational college situated at Belda, Paschim Medinipur, West Bengal. The college was established in 1963 and offers undergraduate education. The college is affiliated to Vidyasagar University.

== History ==
The college was established on 16 August 1963. Belda Satyanarayana Mandir committee and Deuli Sudhir Primary School Committee donated the land and money.

== Facilities and campus ==
The college is situated slightly away from town with a campus of 11 acres (45,000 m^{2}) with a built up area of 4 acres (16,000 m^{2}). The college has its own hostels for boys and girls with a seating capacity of 80 and 30 respectively. The college have separate common rooms for boys and girls with facilities for indoor games like carrom and chess. Further there is provision for playing outdoor games. There is a in campus canteen offering snacks and beverages. The college also have a Netaji Subhas Open University and an IGNOU study center to facilitate distance education.

The college has a well-developed library with about 15,128 books, journals and periodicals along with internet and computer and photocopying facilities. There is a reading room with a seating capacity of 80 students. There are eleven laboratories with minimum adequate facilities for the laboratory based subjects.

== Accreditation ==
The college is recognized by the University Grants Commission (UGC) and accredited as a A+ grade college by the National Assessment and Accreditation Council (NAAC).

== See also ==
- List of institutions of higher education in West Bengal
- Education in India
- Education in West Bengal
