= Hijli railway station =

Railway Station in West Bengal, India

HIJLI

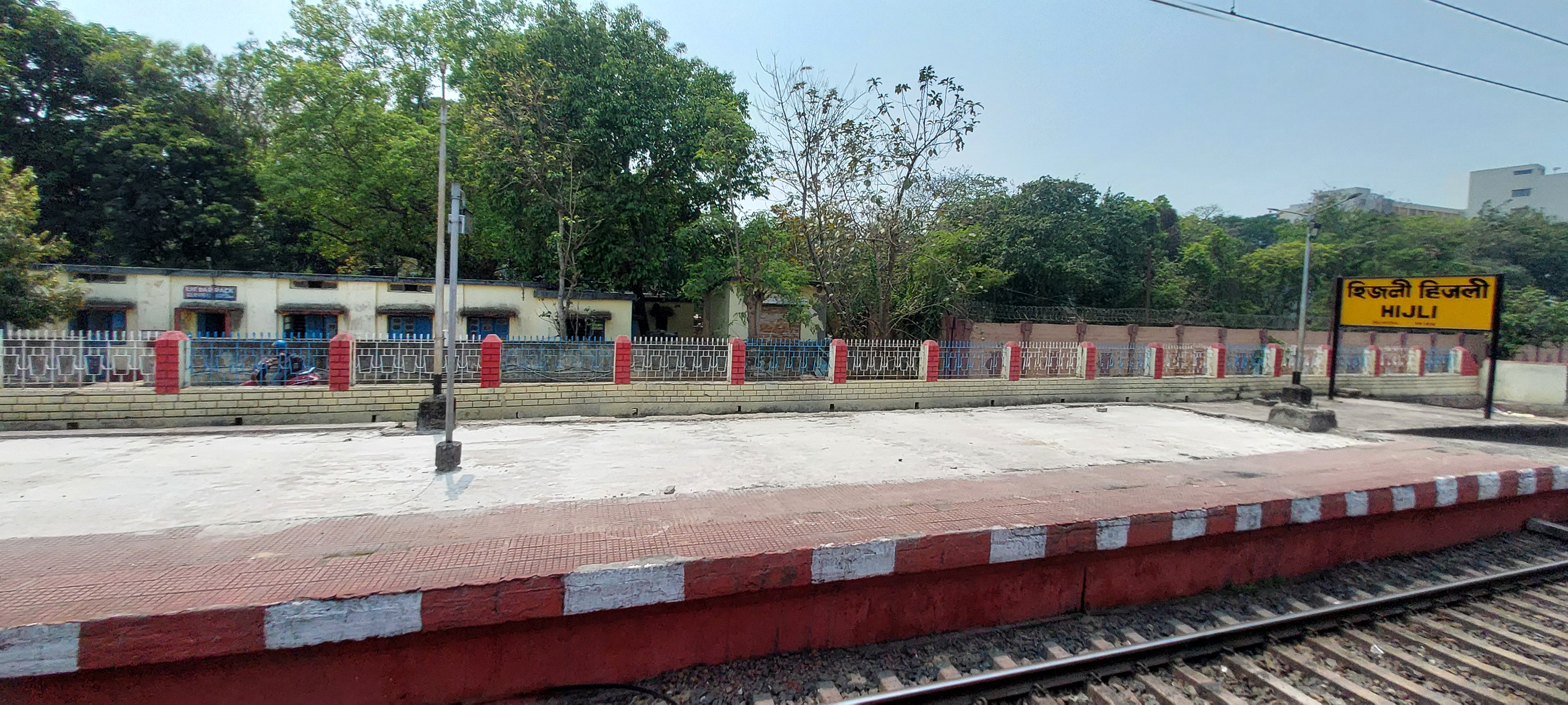
- Hijli railway station platform

General information
- Location: Hijli, Kharagpur, West Bengal, India
- Coordinates: 22.319921°N 87.320169°E
- Elevation: 48 m (157 ft)
- System: Passenger train station, Intercity station
- Owner: Indian Railways
- Operator: South Eastern Railway
- Lines: Howrah–Chennai main line Kharagpur–Puri line
- Platforms: 2
- Tracks: 6

Construction
- Structure type: At grade

Other information
- Status: Functioning
- Station code: HIJ
- Zone(s): South Eastern Railway
- Division(s): Kharagpur

History
- Opened: 1901; 125 years ago
- Former names: East Coast State Railway

Services
| Preceding station | Indian Railways | Following station |
|---|---|---|
| Kharagpur Junction towards Howrah Junction | South Eastern Railway zone Howrah–Chennai main line | Benapur towards Chennai Central |
Location
- Location within India Location within West Bengal
- Interactive map of Hijli

Hijli railway station is a railway station on Kharagpur–Puri line, part of the Howrah–Chennai main line under Kharagpur railway division of South Eastern Railway zone. It is situated at Hijli, Kharagpur in Paschim Medinipur district in the Indian state of West Bengal. It is an alternate railway station to Kharagpur railway station serving the city of Kharagpur.

== History ==
In between 1893 and 1896 the East Coast State Railway constructed Howrah–Chennai main line. Kharagpur–Puri branch was finally opened for public in 1901. The route was electrified in several phases. In 2005, Howrah–Chennai route was completely electrified.
