= Dantan =

- Village
- Location in West Bengal, India Dantan (India)
- Coordinates: 21°54′38.2″N 87°16′12.0″E
- Country: India
- State: West Bengal
- District: Paschim Medinipur

Languages*
  - Official: Bengali, Santali, English
- Time zone: UTC+5:30 (IST)
- PIN: 721426 (Dantan)
- Telephone/STD code: 03229
- Lok Sabha constituency: Medinipur
- Vidhan Sabha constituency: Dantan
- Website: paschimmedinipur.gov.in

Dantan (Bengali pronunciation: [dãtɔn]) is a village in the Dantan I CD block in the Kharagpur subdivision of the Paschim Medinipur district in the state of West Bengal, India.

== Geography ==
Cities and towns in the southern portion of Kharagpur subdivision (including Dantan I & II, Mohanpur, Keshiary, Narayangarh and Sabang CD blocks) of Paschim Medinipur district
CT: census town, R: rural/ urban centre, H: historical/ religious centre
Owing to space constraints in the small map, the actual locations in a larger map may vary slightly

=== Location ===
Dantan is located at 21°54′38.2″N 87°16′12.0″E.

=== Area overview ===
Kharagpur subdivision, shown partly in the map alongside, mostly has alluvial soils, except in two CD blocks in the west – Kharagpur I and Keshiary, which mostly have lateritic soils. Around 74% of the total cultivated area is cropped more than once. With a population density of 787 persons per km^{2,} nearly half of the district’s population resides in this subdivision. 14.33% of the population lives in urban areas and the rest in the rural areas.

Note: The map alongside presents some of the notable locations in the subdivision. All places marked in the map are linked in the larger full screen map.

== Civic administration ==
=== CD block HQ ===
The headquarters of Dantan I CD block are located at Dantan.

=== Police station ===
Dantan police station has jurisdiction over Dantan I CD block.

== Transport ==
The Kolkata-Chennai South Eastern Railway passes through Dantan I CD Block and there is a station at Dantan named Dantan railway station.

The Kolkata-Chennai Golden Quadrilateral National Highway 16 or Kolkata-Bengaluru Asian Highway 45 passes through Dantan. Dantan is well connected with Nayagram via Mogalmari Bhasraghat Road.

== Education ==
Bhatter College at Dantan was established in 1963 and is affiliated to Vidyasagar University. It offers undergraduate courses in arts, commerce and science and also has facilities for some post-graduate courses. The college is named after Mathuranath Bhatter, a local businessman and social worker who had contributed handsomely to set up the college.
