= Nekurseni railway station =

Railway station in West Bengal

General information
- Location: National Highway 16, Nekurseni, Paschim Medinipur district, West Bengal; India
- Coordinates: 22.004654°N 87.306186°E
- Elevation: 24 m (79 ft)
- System: Passenger train station
- Owner: Indian Railways
- Operator: South Eastern Railway
- Lines: Howrah–Chennai main line Kharagpur–Puri line
- Platforms: 3
- Tracks: 4

Construction
- Structure type: Standard (on ground station)

Other information
- Status: Functioning
- Station code: NSI
- Zone(s): South Eastern Railway zone
- Division(s): Kharagpur railway division

History
- Opened: 1901; 125 years ago
- Former names: East Coast State Railway

Services
Preceding station	Indian Railways	Following station
Belda towards Howrah Junction	South Eastern Railway zone Howrah–Chennai main line	Dantan towards Chennai Central
Location
- Location within India Location within West Bengal

Nekurseni railway station is a railway station on Kharagpur–Puri line, part of the Howrah–Chennai main line under Kharagpur railway division of South Eastern Railway zone. It is situated beside National Highway 60 at Nekurseni in Paschim Medinipur district in the Indian state of West Bengal.

== History ==
In between 1893 and 1896 the East Coast State Railway constructed Howrah–Chennai main line. Kharagpur–Puri branch was finally opened for public in 1901. The route was electrified in several phases. In 2005, Howrah–Chennai route was completely electrified.
