= Rajnagar Block, Kendrapara =

Rajnagar Block
- Interactive map of Rajnagar Block
- Coordinates: 20.57°N 86.71°E
- Elevation: 4.00 m (13.12 ft)

Rajnagar Block is a block in Kendrapara district of the Indian state of Odisha.

== Geography ==
It is surrounded by the Bay of Bengal to the east, the Bhadrakh district to the North, the Rajkanika block to west, and Pattamundai, and Mahakalapada block in South.

The main river of Rajnagar Block is the Hansua, which is a branch of the Brahmani River.

The members of the Gram Panchayats (village council) of this block are Baghamari, Balisahi Patna, Bandhapada, Belpal, Bhitargada, Brahman Sahi, Chandi Baunsamula, Dangamal, Dera, Ghadiamal, Gupti, Hatina, Iswarpur, Kandira, Keredagada, Keruapal Khamarsahi, Koilipur, Krushna Nagar, Kurunti, Mahnisasura, Mahulia, Ostia, Rajnagar, Rajpur, Rangani, Sanabada Gopalpur, Satavaya, Talachua.

== Demographics ==
According to the 2011 census, Rajnagar hosted a population of 170,110. Rajnagar has a gender-ratio of 979 females for every 1000 males. The majority language is Odia.

== Culture ==
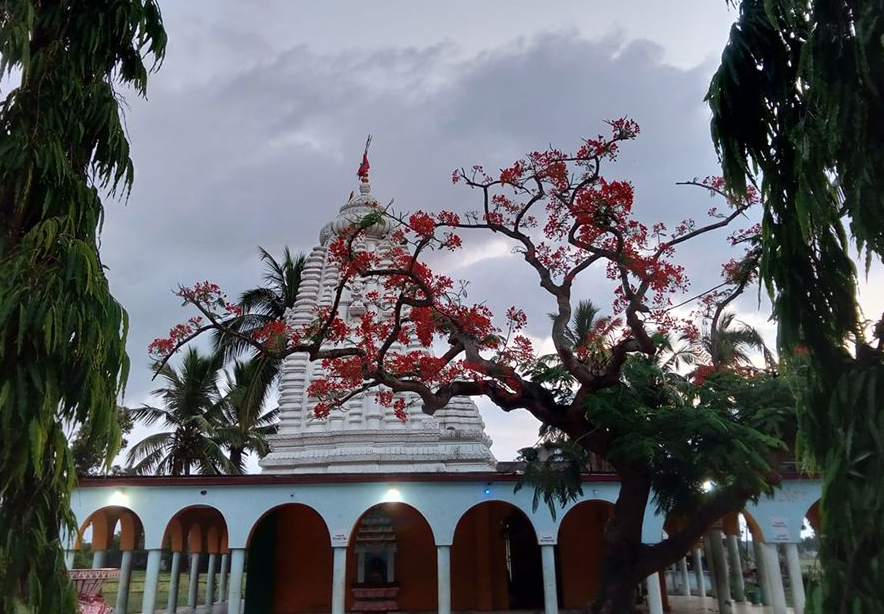
Garteswar Temple

In Kendrapara people celebrate Raja Parba, Dola Yatra, Ratha Yatra, Durga Puja Kumar Purnima, Shiva Ratri, Shiba Vibah and Makar Sankranti festivals. Raja Parba is related to cultivation. Rajnagar and the nearby periphery are popular during Durga Puja. The Garteswar Pitha is situated at Gosigan village and attracts devotees during Shiva Ratri and Shiva Vibah.

== Economy ==
Most of the residents are farmers, while some work in business. Fishing in the Hansua River is a common occupation. Farming prawn near the seashore is a profitable business.

== Tourism ==
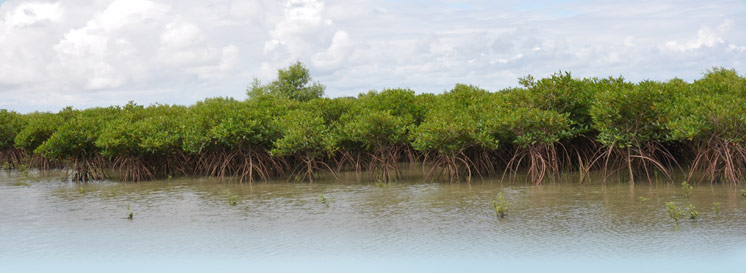
Mangrove forest Bhitarkanika

Bhitarkanika National Park was declared a sanctuary on 21 April 1975. It is covered with deep mangrove forests, saline rivers, and is known for crocodile breeding. Other animals including deer, wild boar, monkey, pythons and king cobras are also found there. It is located in the Estuarial region of Brahmani-Baitarani. The park covers 145 square kilometres (56 sq mi).

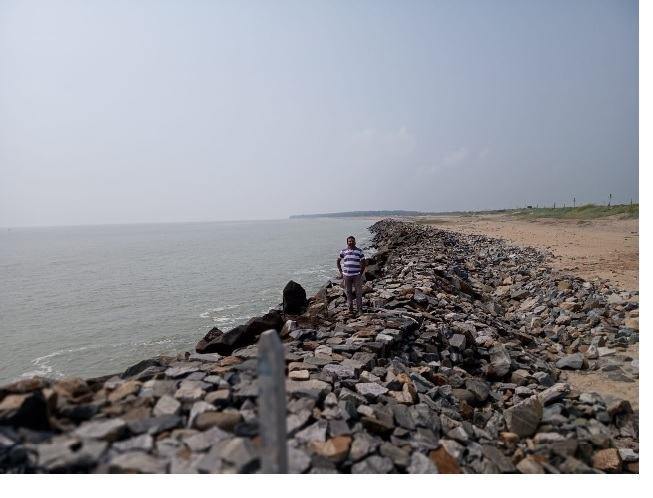
Pentha Seabeach Rajnagar Kendrapara

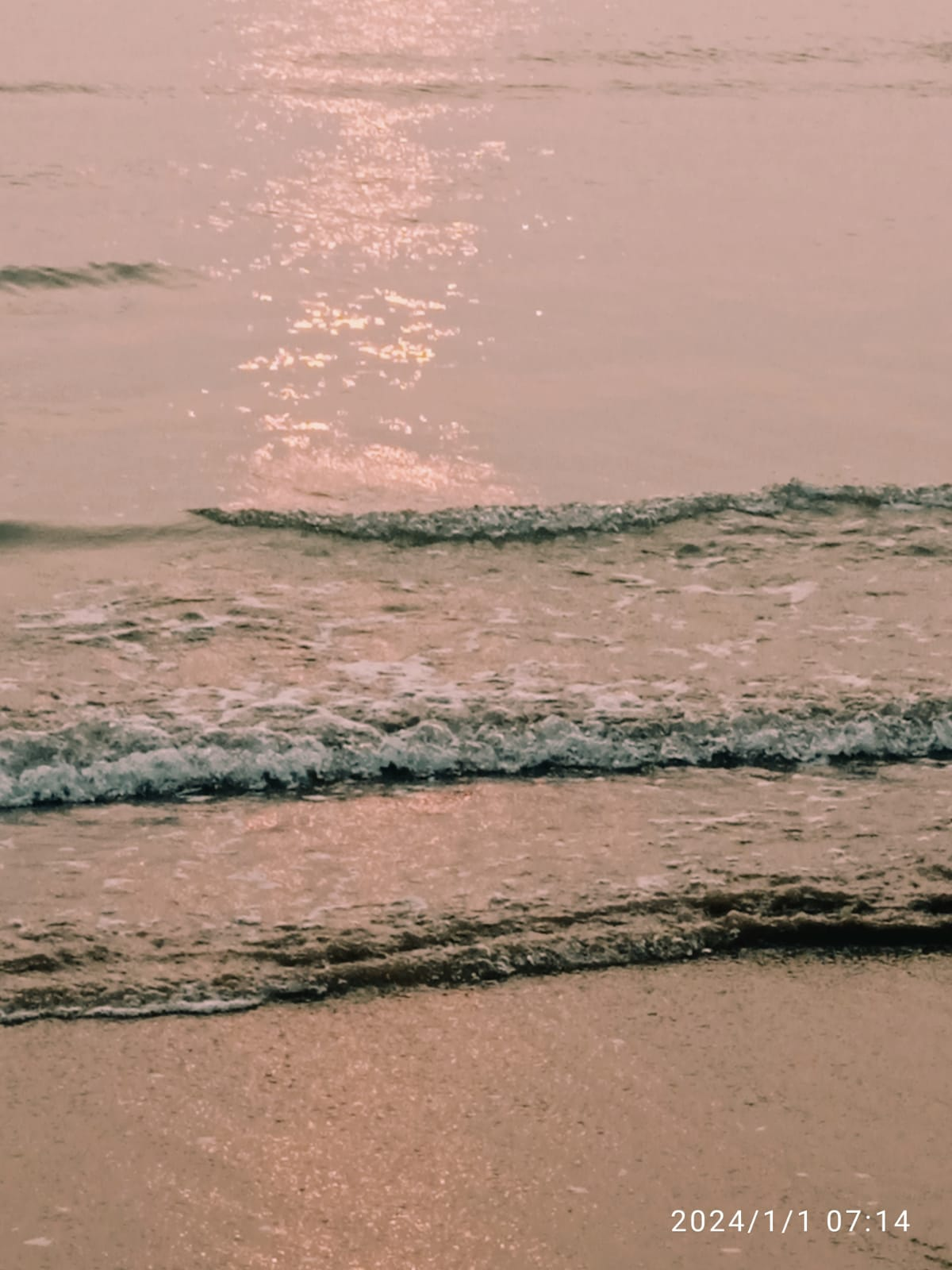
Sun rise at Pentha Sea Beach, Kendrapara

Pentha The 10-km-long sea beach at Pentha is neglected with no visitor infrastructure. Nowadays Odisha Tourism dept has initiated eco tourism near on sea beach which is a good step to attract tourists. Close to the beach is a forest along with the Barunei river mouth.
