= Narayangarh, Mandsaur =

Narayangarh
- city
- Location in Madhya Pradesh, India Narayangarh (India)
- Coordinates: 24.28°N 75.05°E
- Country: India
- State: Madhya Pradesh
- District: Mandsaur
- Founder: Narayan Rao Bargal
- Elevation: 434 m (1,424 ft)

Population (2011)
  - Total: 10,191

Languages
  - Official: Hindi
- Time zone: UTC+5:30 (IST)
- Postal code: 458553
- ISO 3166 code: IN-MP
- Vehicle registration: MP-14

Narayangarh is a nagar panchayat city in district of Mandsaur, Madhya Pradesh. The city is divided into 15 wards for which elections are held every 5 years. The Narayangarh Nagar Panchayat has population of 10,191 of which 5,168 are males while 5,023 are females as per report released by Census India 2011.

Narayangarh has a small lake. It has an agriculture based economy. Its main crops are garlic, soya bean, isabgol, wheat and opium. The town is known for its quality opium production.

== Geography ==
It has an average elevation of 434 metres (1,423 feet).

== Demographics ==
As of 2001 India census, Narayangarh had a population of 10,191. Males constitute 51% of the population and females 49%. Thirteen percent of the population is under age 6. Narayangarh has an average literacy rate of 70%. Male literacy is 80%, and female literacy is 60%. Narayangarh is also known for its agriculture production. It has been a producer of soybean, garlic and isabgol and opium.

== Transport ==
Narayangarh is well connected by roads, and is situated on Pipliya-manasa-kota (R.J) Road, it is 12 km from Pipliya Mandi. It is 28 kilometres from District HQ-Mandsaur and 7 kilometres from Tehsil HQ-Malhargarh. The nearest airport is Udaipur Rajasthan.
