= Sherpur Bhura =

Village in Uttar Pradesh, India

- Village
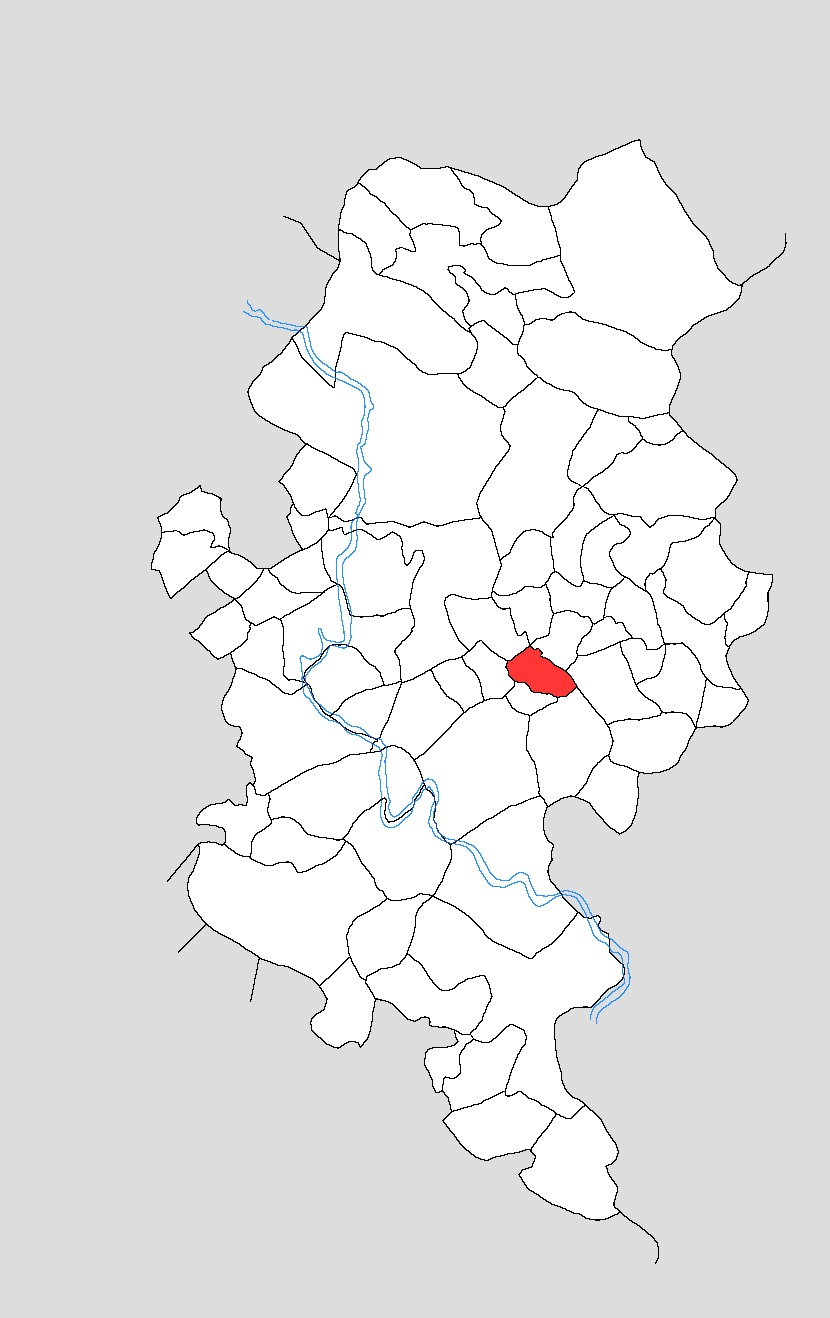
- Map showing Sherpur Bhura in Kotla block

- Location in Uttar Pradesh, India
- Coordinates: 27.26451°N 78.43536°E
- Country: India
- State: Uttar Pradesh
- District: Firozabad
- Tehsil: Firozabad

Area
  - Total: 1.141 km^{2} (0.441 sq mi)

Population (2011)
  - Total: 115
  - Density: 101/km^{2} (261/sq mi)
- Time zone: UTC+5:30 (IST)

Sherpur Bhura (Śerpur Bhūṛā) is a village in Kotla block of Firozabad district, Uttar Pradesh, India. As of 2011, it had a population of 115, in 22 households.

== Demographics ==
As of 2011, Sherpur Bhura had a population of 115, in 22 households. This population was 56.5% male (65) and 43.5% female (50). The 0-6 age group numbered 14 (9 male and 5 female), making up 12.2% of the total population. No residents were members of Scheduled Castes.

The 1981 census recorded Sherpur Bhura as having a population of 79 people (46 male and 33 female), in 13 households and 13 physical houses.

The 1961 census recorded Sherpur Bhura as comprising 1 hamlet, with a total population of 37 people (22 male and 15 female), in 6 households and 5 physical houses. The area of the village was given as 289 acres.

== Infrastructure ==
As of 2011, Sherpur Bhura did not have any schools or healthcare facilities. Drinking water was provided by hand pump and tube well/borehole; there were no public toilets. The village did not have a post office or public library; there was at least some access to electricity for all purposes. Streets were made of both kachcha and pakka materials.
