= Belda =

- Town
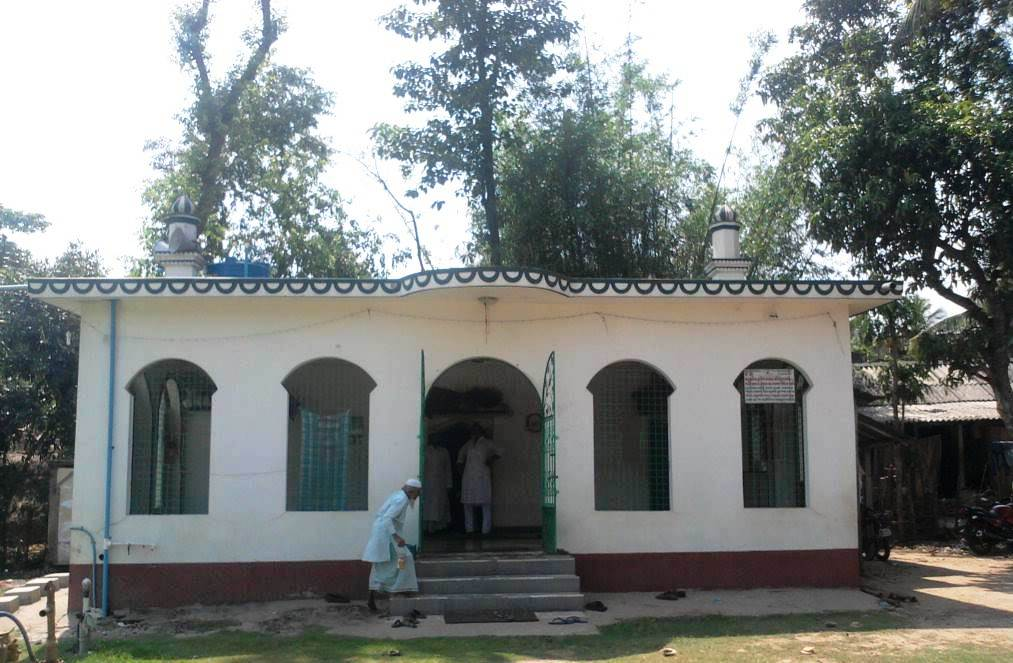
- Belda Jame Mosque

- Location in West Bengal, India
- Coordinates: 22.08°N 87.35°E
- Country: India
- State: West Bengal
- District: Paschim Medinipur
- Elevation: 42 m (138 ft)

Population (2011)
  - Total: 25,000

Languages
  - Official: Bengali, English
- Time zone: UTC+5:30 (IST)
- PIN: 721424
- Telephone code: 03229
- ISO 3166 code: IN-WB
- Vehicle registration: WB
- Website: paschimmedinipur.gov.in

Belda (Bengali pronunciation: [belda]), is a town in the Narayangarh CD block in the Kharagpur subdivision of the Paschim Medinipur district in West Bengal, India.

== Geography ==
Cities and towns in the southern portion of Kharagpur subdivision (including Dantan I & II, Mohanpur, Keshiary, Narayangarh and Sabang CD blocks) of Paschim Medinipur district
CT: census town, R: rural/ urban centre, H: historical/ religious centre
Owing to space constraints in the small map, the actual locations in a larger map may vary slightly

=== Location ===
Belda is located at 22.08°N 87.35°E. It has an average elevation of 12 metres (42 feet).

It is located approximately 35 km south of Kharagpur town, 50 km from district headquarter Midnapore and 165 km from the state capital city Kolkata/Calcutta. NH 60 and SH 5 cross at Belda. It is also well connected by railways and also known as 'The Gateway to Odisha'. Thus, Belda plays an important role in connecting eastern India with southern India. Due to its easy access from different parts, it is a good business center.

=== Area overview ===
Kharagpur subdivision, shown partly in the map alongside, mostly has alluvial soils, except in two CD blocks in the west – Kharagpur I and Keshiary, which mostly have lateritic soils. Around 74% of the total cultivated area is cropped more than once. With a density of population of 787 per km^{2}nearly half of the district's population resides in this subdivision. 14.33% of the population lives in urban areas and 86.67% in the rural areas.

Note: The map alongside presents some of the notable locations in the subdivision. All places marked in the map are linked in the larger full screen map.

== Demographics ==
According to the 2011 Census of India, Belda had a total population of 762 of which 386 (51%) were males and 376 (49%) females. Population in the age range 0–6 years was 75. The total number of literate persons in Belda was 665 (87’27% of the population over 6 years).

== Police station ==
Belda police station has jurisdiction over the Dantan II CD block.

== Transport ==
Belda railway station is under the administrative control of the South Eastern Railway. The station is located about 70 km (43.50 mi) from Digha and is on the Kharagpur-Puri line. The main train connections include East Coast Express, Sri Jagannath Express, Puri Weekly SF Express, Bhubaneswar Jan Shatabdi Express, Simlipal Intercity Express, SMVT Bengaluru Amrit Bharat Express, Villupuram SF Express, Shalimar SF Express, Khurda Road Express, Coromandel Express, Jajpur Keonjhar Road Express, Bagha Jatin Express, Dhauli Express etc.Computerized Reserved and Unreserved ticketing facility is available here. The major railhead close to the station is Kharagpur Junction Railway Station.

The Kolkata-Chennai Golden Quadrilateral National Highway 16 or Kolkata-Bengaluru Asian Highway 45 passes through Belda.

== Cultures and festivals ==
Belda celebrates most of the common Bengali festivals. Most important festival is Durga Puja, which attracts thousands of people. Kali puja is another popular one. Other festivals includes Saraswati puja, Basanti puja, Janmashtami, Rath Yatra, Ram Navami, Shitala puja, Ganesh Chaturthi. Dassera and Diwali are very well known among the Gujrati communities living in this town.

And most popular Mela of Basanta Utasab.

Satyanarayan Mandir is one of the mandir where Navratri is celebrated with a bright, elegant and traditional dance style called Garba. It attracts Gujaratis from places far as it is still conducted in traditional form and is still pure in devotion of Maa Ambi and also ratha jatra.

Almost all type of religious people stay at Belda. And because of these reason, not only all Beli festivals, others religious festivals also happens at Belda like: Navratri, Marwar Festival,Chhath Puja, Mahavir Jayanti, Basanta Utsab etc.

== Education ==
=== Schools ===
- Belda Gangadhar Academy
- Belda Prabhati Balika Vidyapith
- Belda Binapani Primary School
- Belda Himansu Sekhar Prathamik Vidhyalaya
- Belda Saradamoyee primary School
- Belda English Medium School(C.I.S.C.E/I.C.S.E)
- Belda Lions School Life & Light
- Shivananda Shiksha Niketan
- Belda Janaki School
- Belda Janaki Hindi Shiksha Niketan [Hindi Medium-Primary School]
- Deuli High School
- Deuli Sudhir buniyadi Primary School

=== Colleges ===
- Belda College: It is affiliated to Vidyasagar University and it provides graduation on many of major subjects and it is also provides post graduation in English and Bengali. Belda College is in the list of top three colleges among V.U colleges.

== Notable people ==
- Hemchandra Kanungo- born in Radhanagar he was an Indian nationalist and a member of the Anushilan Samiti.
