= Thotlakonda =

Thotlakonda Buddhist Complex Senagiri
- Protected Buddhist Monument
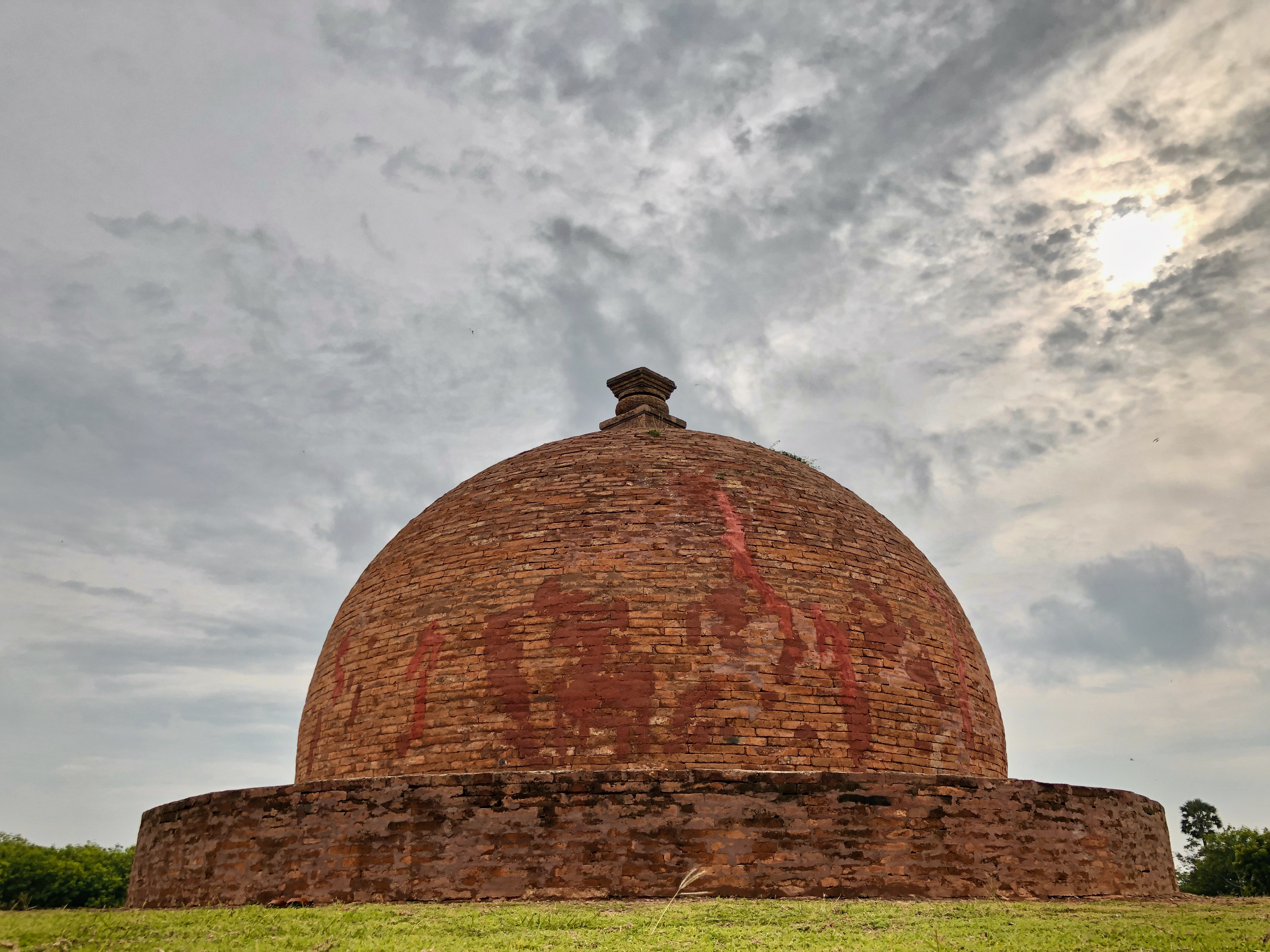
- Maha Stupa at Thotlakonda

- Location in Andhra Pradesh, India
- Coordinates: 17°49′35″N 83°24′34″E
- Country: India
- State: Andhra Pradesh
- District: Visakhapatnam

Languages
  - Official: Telugu
- Time zone: UTC+5:30 (IST)
- Nearest city: Visakhapatnam

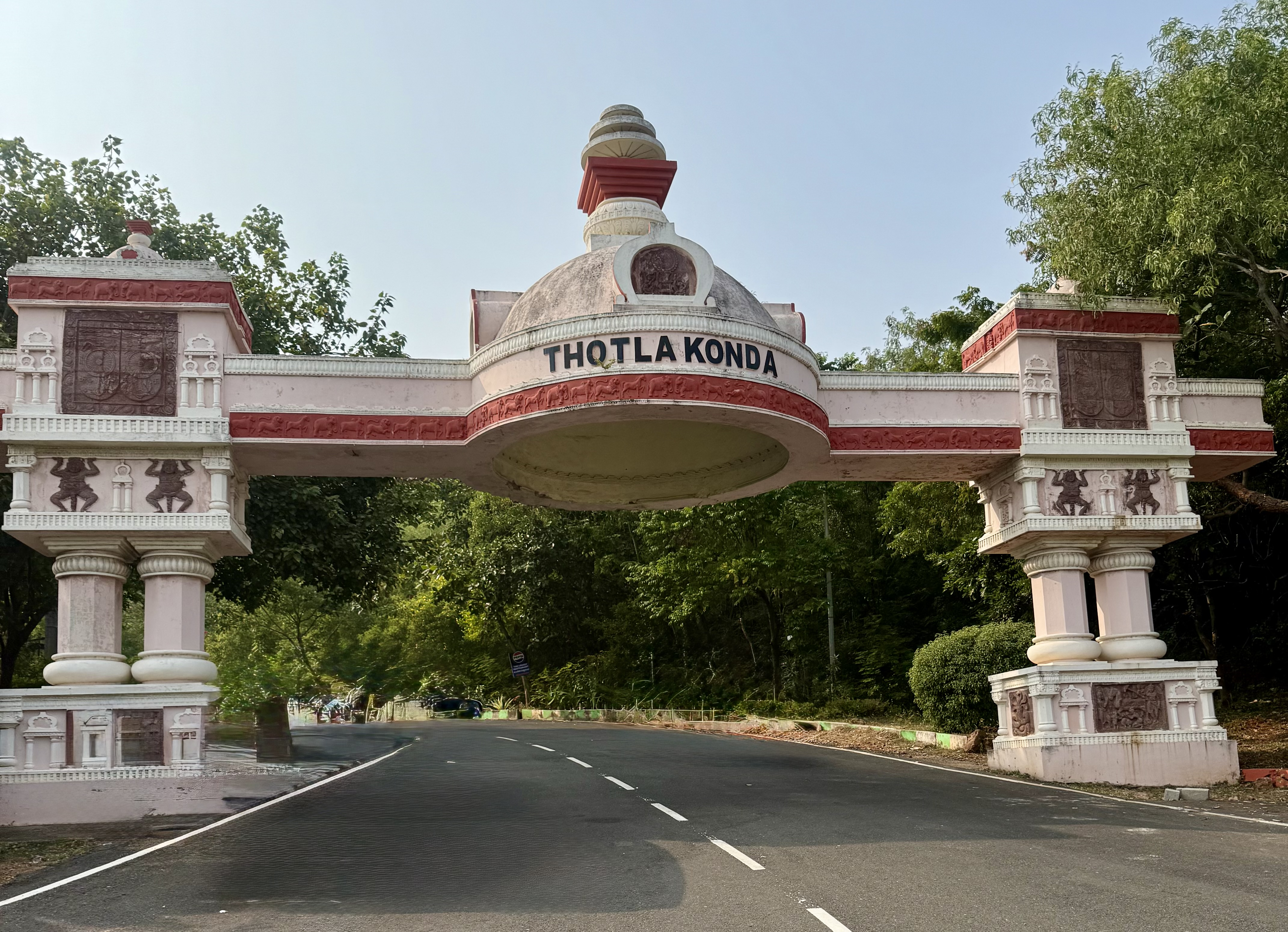
Entrance to Totlakonda

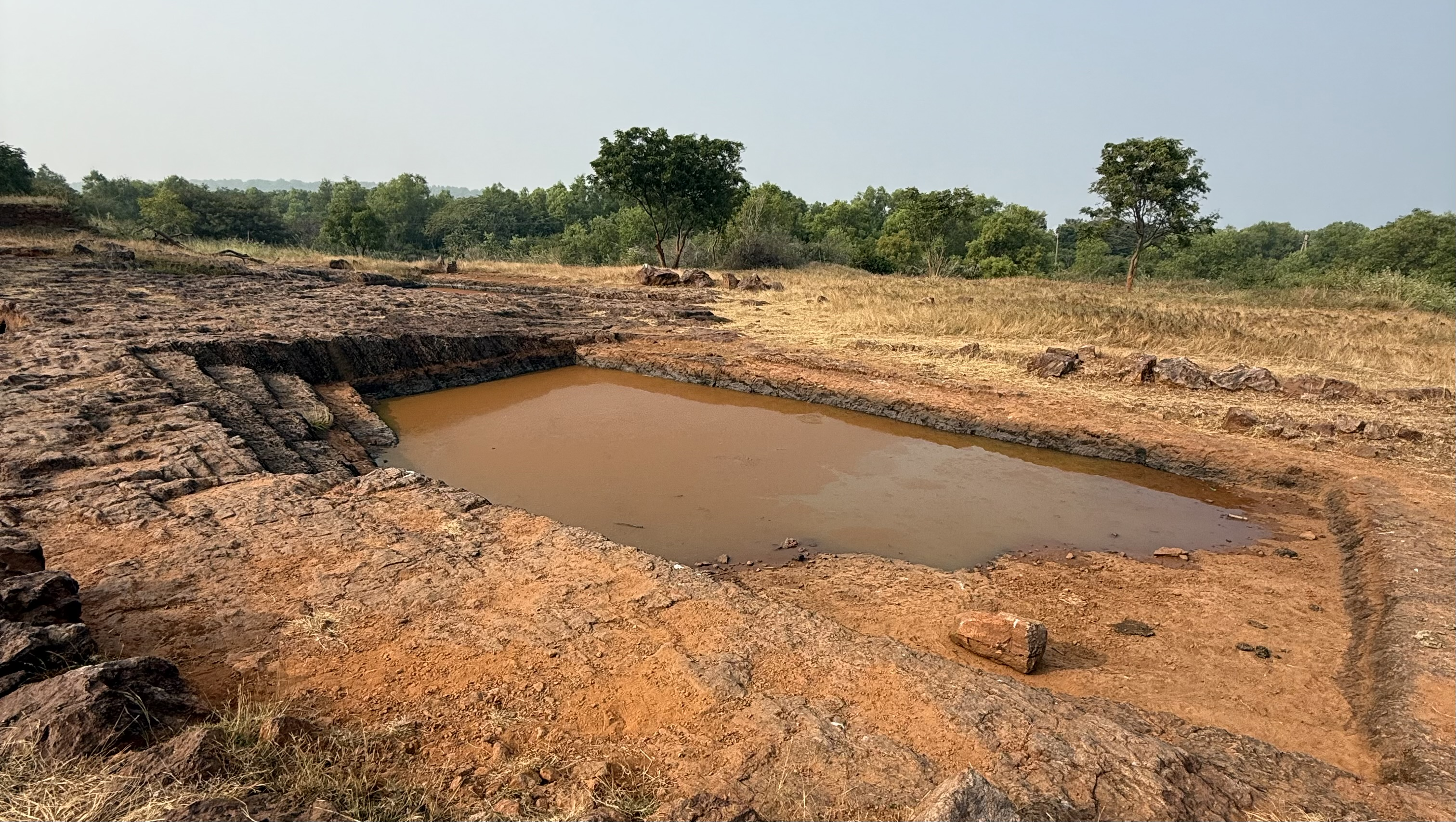
Water tank carved in rock, Totlakonda

Thotlakonda Buddhist Complex is situated on a hill near Bheemunipatnam about 15 kilometres (9.3 mi) from Visakhapatnam in Andhra Pradesh, India. The hill is about 128 metres (420 ft) above sea level and overlooks the ocean. The Telugu name Toṭlakoṇḍa (తొట్లకొండ) derived from the presence of a number of rock-cut cisterns hewn into the bedrock of the hillock. “Thotlakonda" may also mean “hill of cisterns.” In 2019, the stupa was partially damaged due to monsoons, but it was restored by 2021 at the cost of Rs 42 lakh.

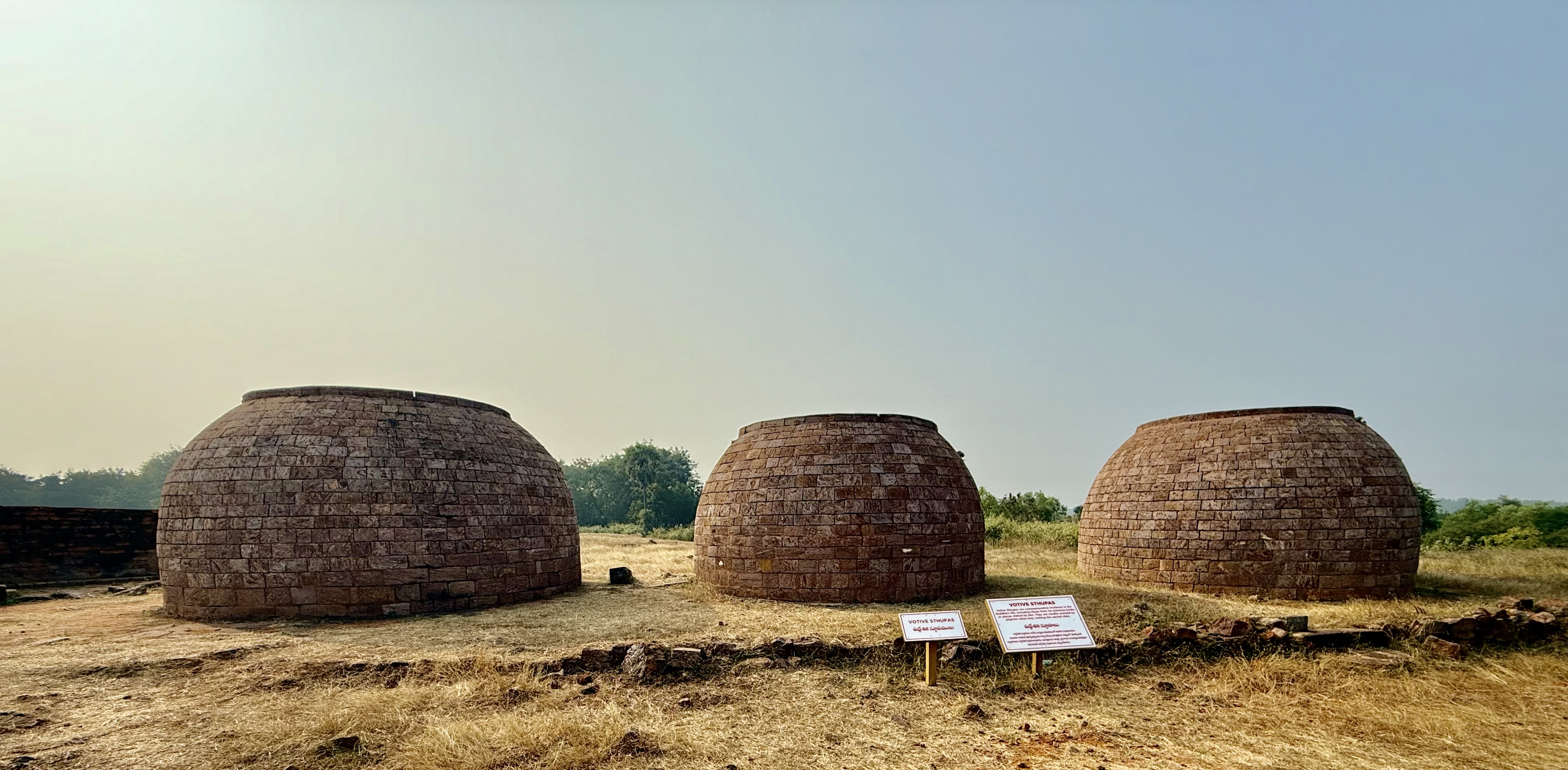
Votive Sthupas, Totlakonda

Thotlakonda was well within the influence of Kalinga, an important source of dissemination of Buddhism to Sri Lanka and various parts of Southeast Asia. Also, it was one of the ports of entry for pilgrims arriving via th sea to visit prominent Buddhist places located near the 83.3 degree Meridian East. Thotlakonda's history provides an insight into the process of transoceanic diffusion of Indic culture, especially Buddhism.

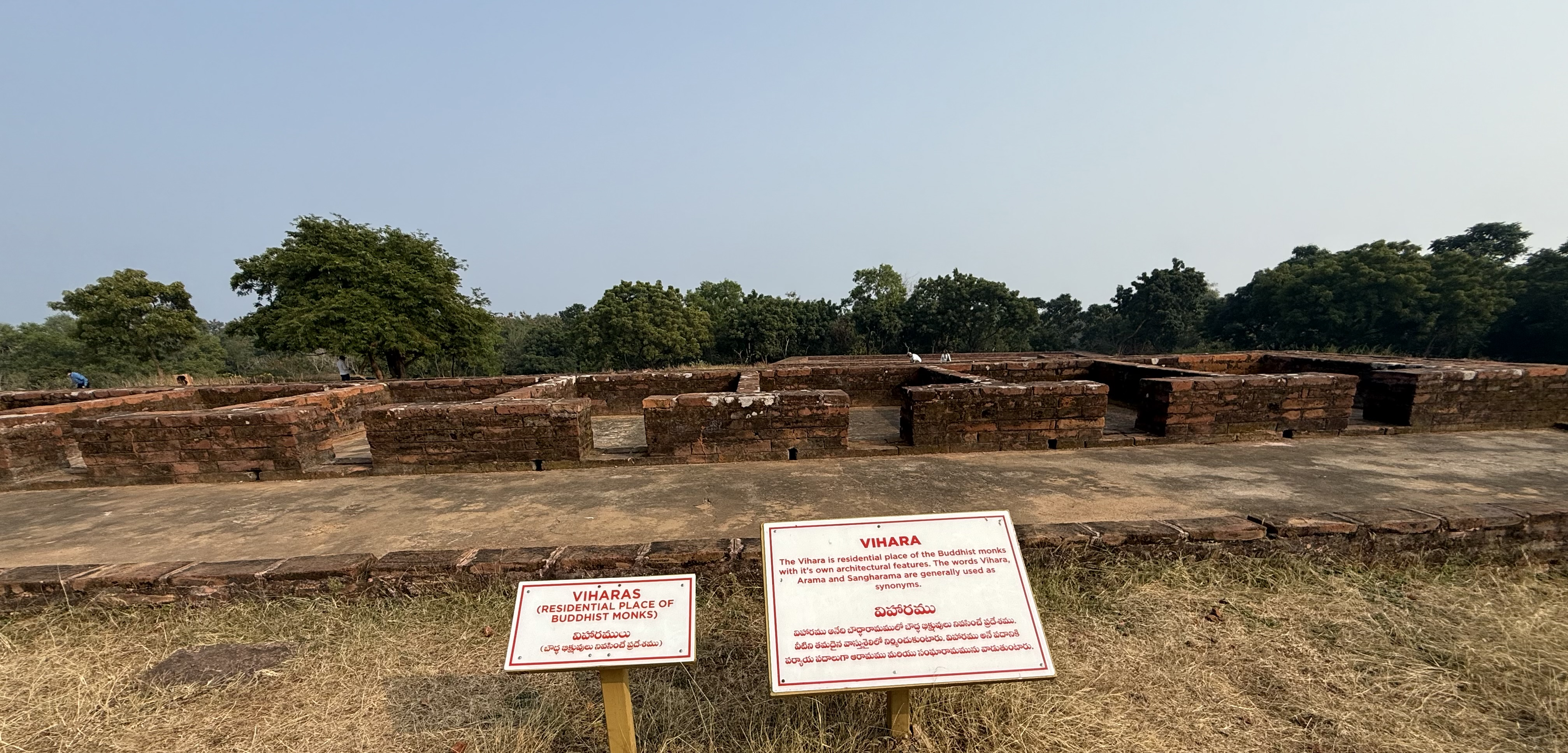
Bauddha Viharas, Totlakonda

A hill on the sea coast with a salubrious (healthy) climate was an ideal attraction for the Buddhist monks to build a monastery complex. The placid sea, sheltered by the deeply curved coastline, provided a safe haven for anchoring ships. Buddhist sites such as Thotlakonda, Sarnath, Kushinagar and Lumbini lie very close to the longitudinal 83.3 degrees Meridian East. People coming to India by sea to visit important Buddhist sites looked for the shortest route to travel; it is believed that many stopped at Thotlakonda, a transit point where they anchored their ships, rested on the hill for a while, and then continued along the 83.3° East meridian northwards.

Thotlakonda came to light during an aerial survey by the Indian Navy for setting up a naval base. After its discovery, major excavations were conducted by the Andhra Pradesh State Archaeology Department from 1988 to 1993. The excavations established the existence of a Nikaya Buddhist complex which flourished 2000 years ago. To the south of the complex there is a tank which served as a water source to the monastery inhabitants.

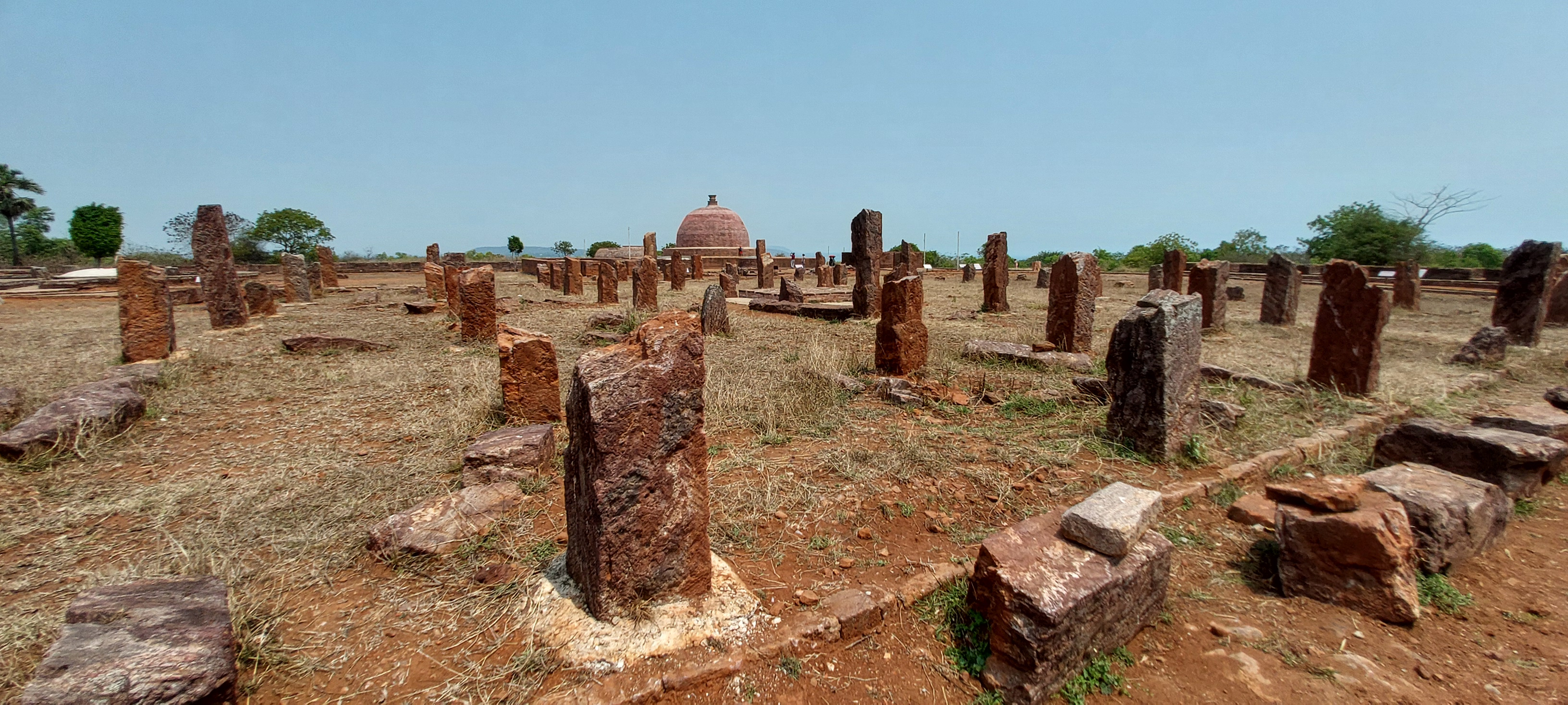
Thotlakonda Buddhist Complex

The excavations reveal Satavahana dynasty lead and Roman silver coins indicating foreign trade; terracotta tiles, stucco decorative pieces, sculptured panels, miniature stupa models in stone, and Buddha footprints were also found. The excavations also yielded twelve inscriptions. From linguistic studies, it appears that the hill might have been known as Senagiri; Sena in Pali means "elder, superior".

Thotlakonda's peak activity was between the 2nd century BCE and the 2nd century CE owing to brisk Roman trade and religious missions sent abroad. Thotlakonda came into existence along with nearby Buddhist sites in Visakhapatnam like Bavikonda and Pavurallakonda. The lofty stupas shining during the day, with their light lime plaster and with rows of wick lamps during nights, might have served as guiding landmarks of nautical commuters. While there appears to have been no royal patronage, traders and local Buddhists seem to have supported the monasatic sangha. In its heyday, Thotlakonda might have accommodated more than 100 bhikkhus.

The complex served as a religious-academic center, with arrangements for storing food, clothing, and medicines. Nikaya Buddhism appears to have been practiced at Thotlakonda, including the worship of Gautama Buddha through aniconic symbols such as padukas, ashtamangala and other methods of non-human representation.

Thotlakonda had declined by the end of the 3rd century.

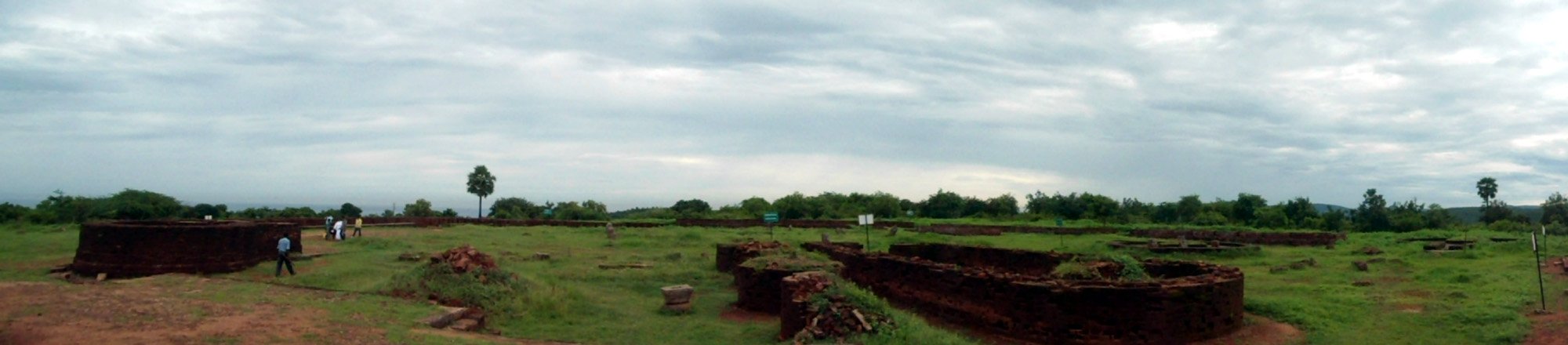
Thotlakonda Monastic Complex Panoramic view
