= Pavurallakonda =

Ancient protected Buddhist monument in Andhra Pradesh, India

Pavurallakonda Pavurallabodu
- Protected Buddhist Monument
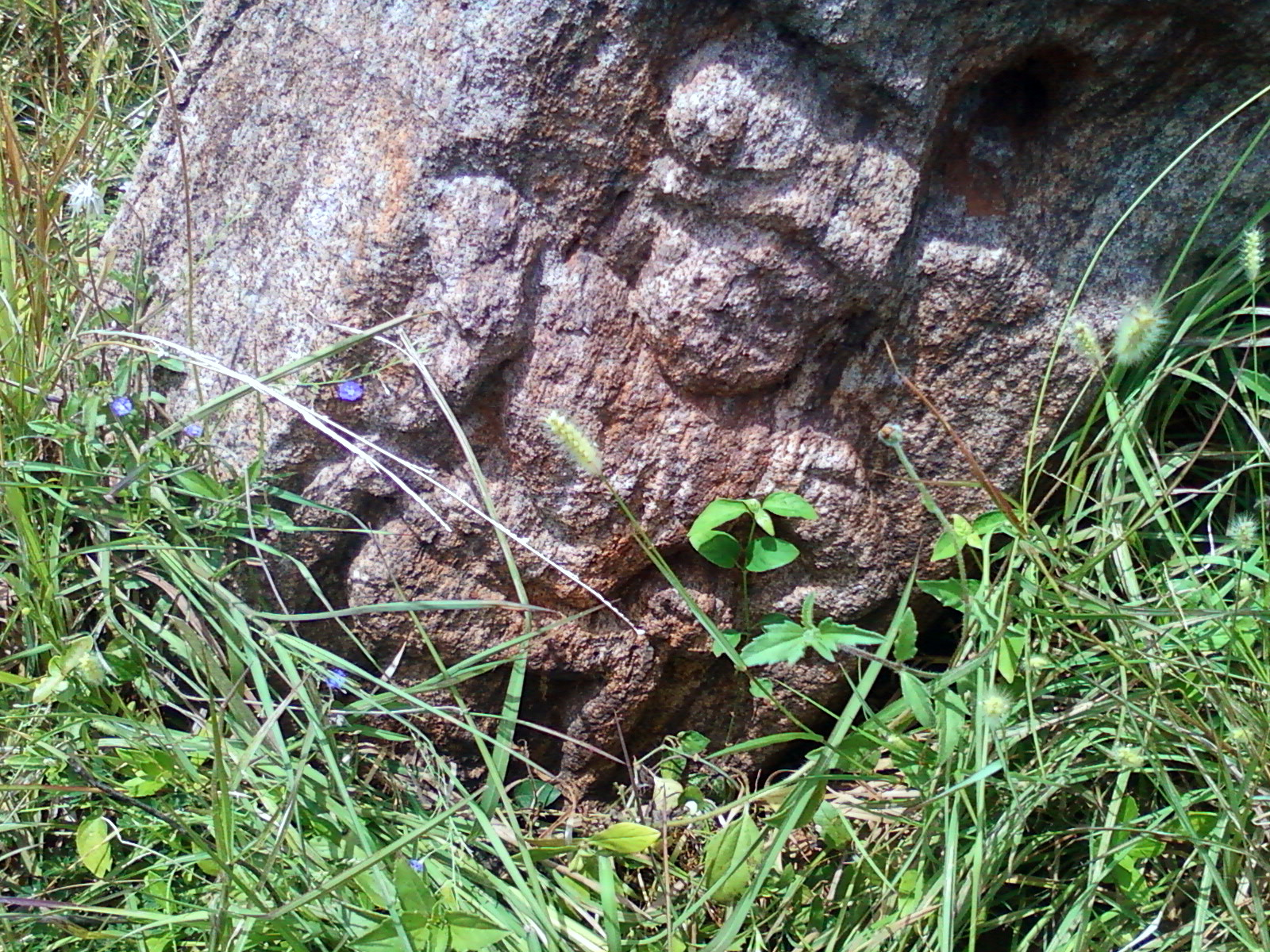
- Yaksha sculpture at Pavurallakonda near Bheemunipatnam

- Location in Visakhapatnam, India
- Coordinates: 17°53′19″N 83°26′14″E
- Country: India
- State: Andhra Pradesh
- District: Visakhapatnam
- Elevation: 150 m (490 ft)

Languages
  - Official: Telugu
- Time zone: UTC+5:30 (IST)
- Nearest city: Visakhapatnam

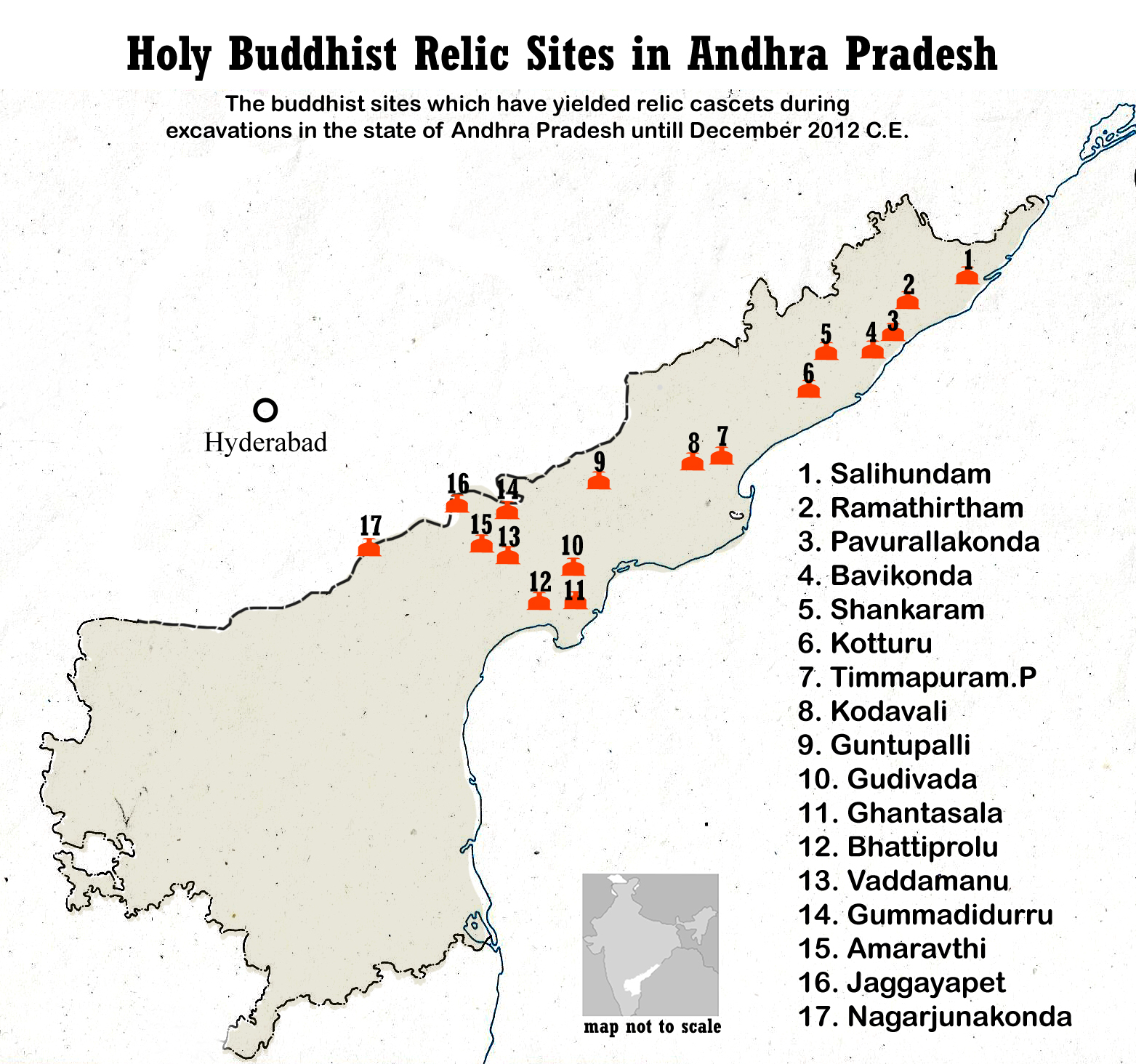
Holy relic sites map of Andhra Pradesh

Pavurallakonda or Pavurallabodu is a hill popularly known as Narasimhaswamy Konda. It is located near Bheemunipatnam, about 25 km north of Visakhapatnam, Andhra Pradesh, India.

Pavurallakonda consists of a ruined hilltop Buddhist monastic complex that witnessed human habitation anywhere from the 3rd century BCE to the 2nd century CE. It is one of the largest Buddhist monasteries in the North Coastal Andhra Region. Hinayana Buddhism may have been practiced at this hilltop site.

The initial excavation of this site yielded many relics. Among the ruins are two Brahmi label inscriptions, foundations of Viharas, circular chaityas, votive stupas, and halls. Coins, polished ware, beads, and other artifacts were unearthed from the site by the Andhra Pradesh Department of Archaeology and Museums. Nearly sixteen rock-cut cisterns were carved on the hill for the storage of rainwater. Excavations and restoration programs are ongoing at Pavurallakonda.

The Gosthani River flows near this site and is near Bavikonda and Thotlakonda, two Buddhist sites in the Visakhapatnam district.

The Indian National Trust for Arts and Cultural Heritage (INTACH) has appealed to the authorities to ensure better protection of Buddhist sites after Bavikonda, Thotlakonda, Pavurallakonda, and Bojjannakonda were designated as heritage sites by UNESCO.

== Origin of the name ==
Pavurallakonda means 'The Hill of the Pigeons' (pavuralu in Telugu means pigeons, and konda means hill). However, some studies conducted at this site suggest that it may be known as Pavurallakonda due to the white stones on the hillock (pavurallu means "white stones" locally).

== Gallery ==
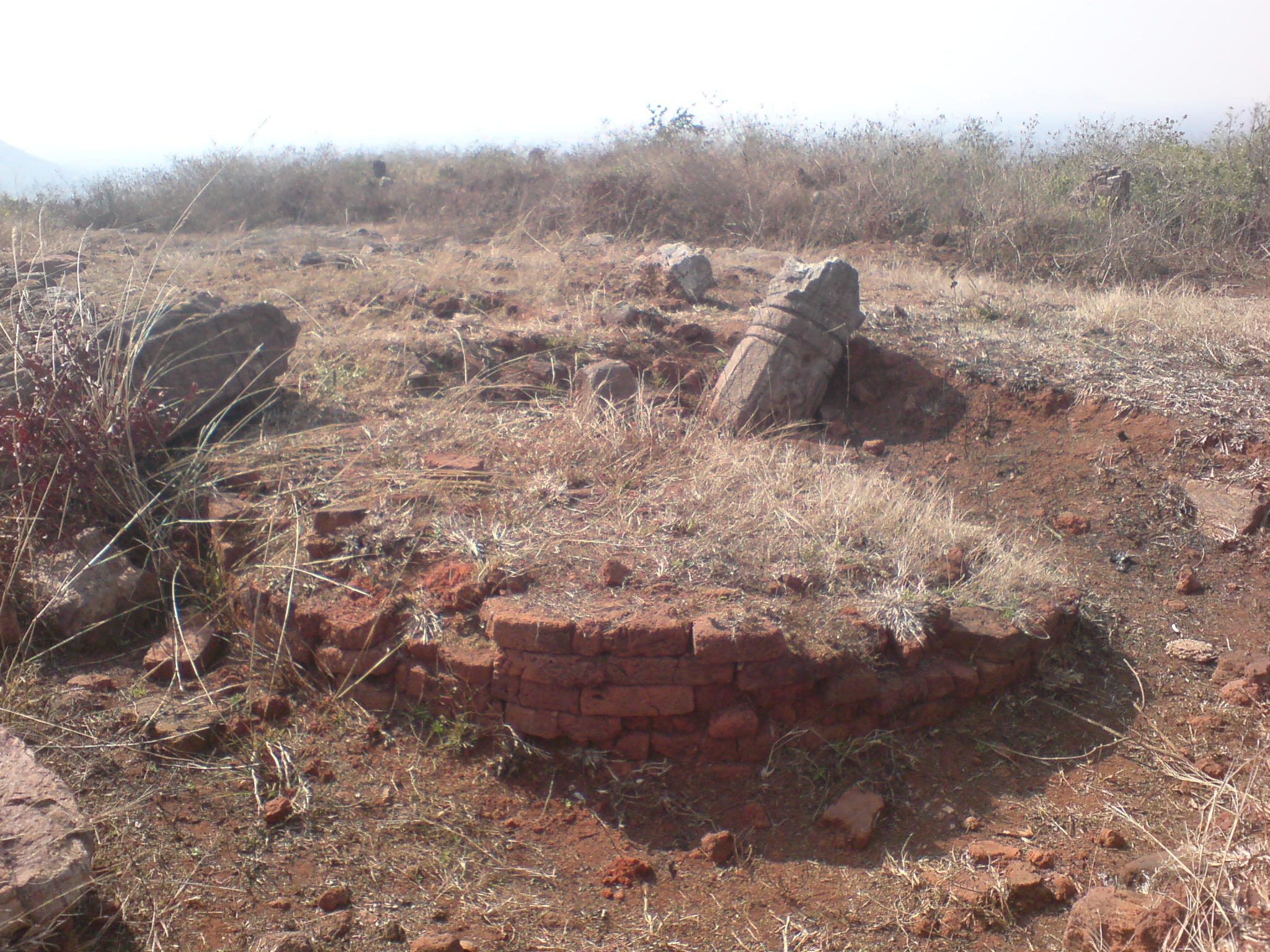
Remnants of a Buddhist Stupa at Pavurallakonda

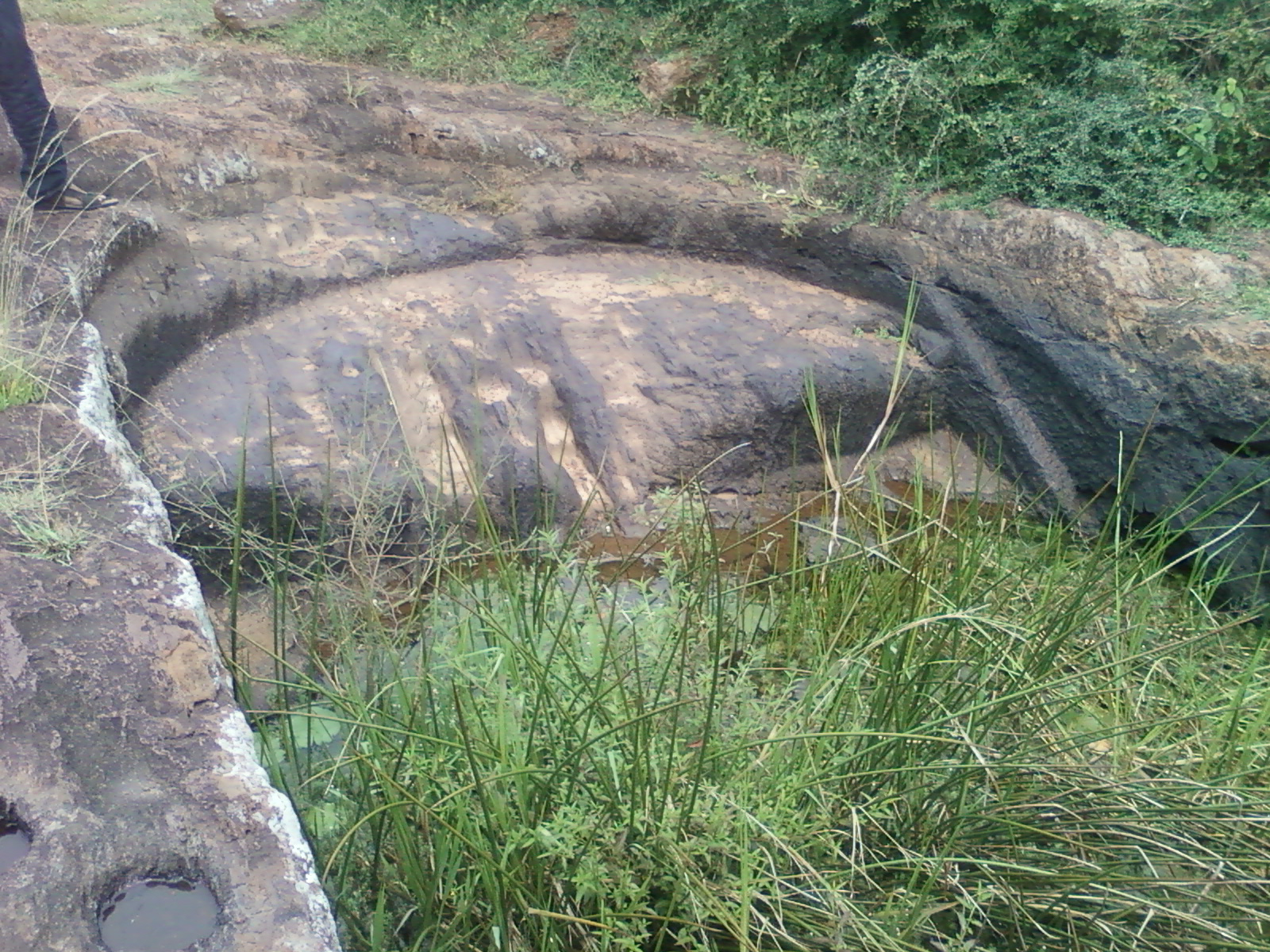
Buddhist rock-cut Cistern at Pavurallakonda

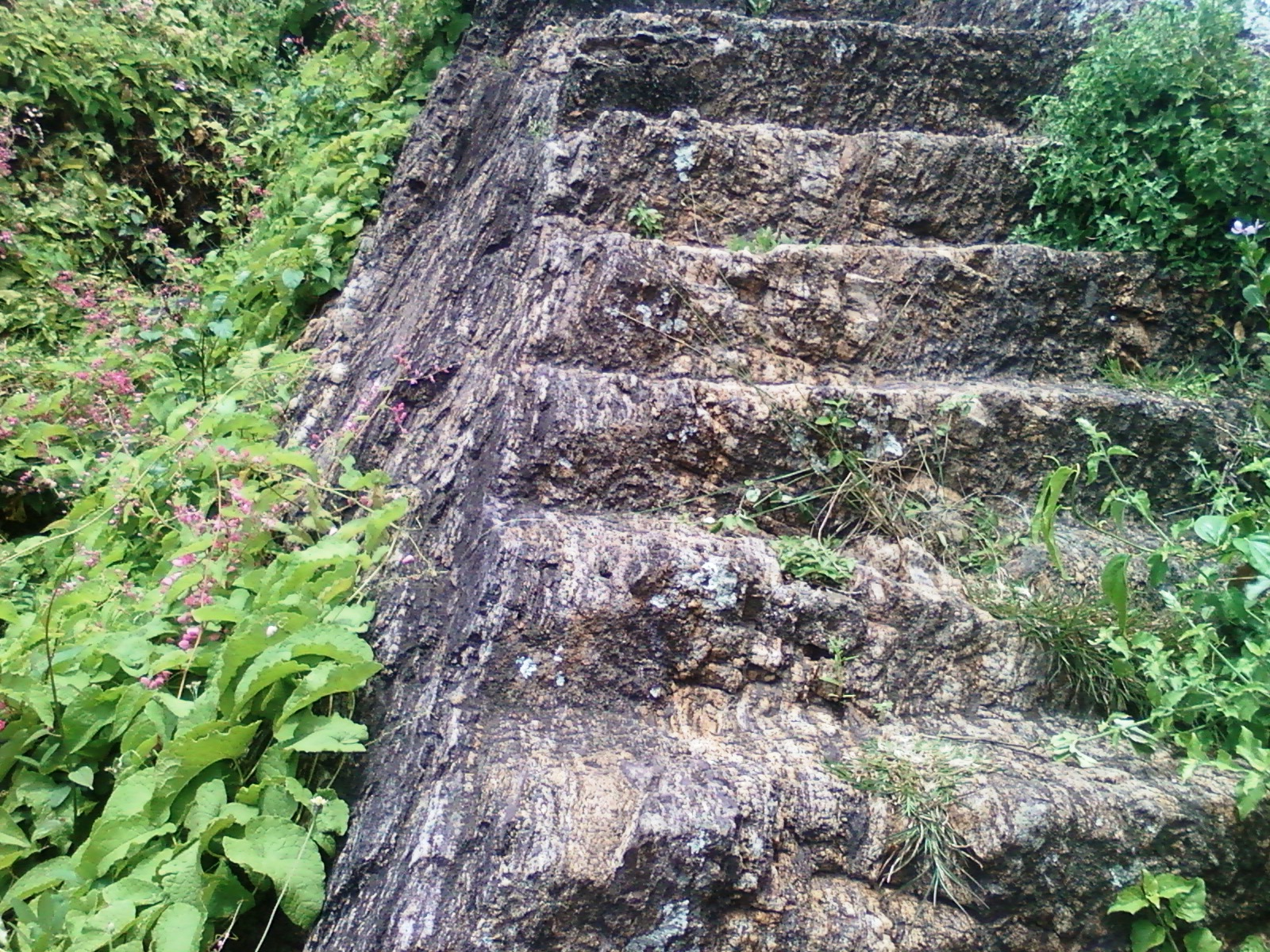
Rock-cut steps Pavurallakonda Buddhist ruins

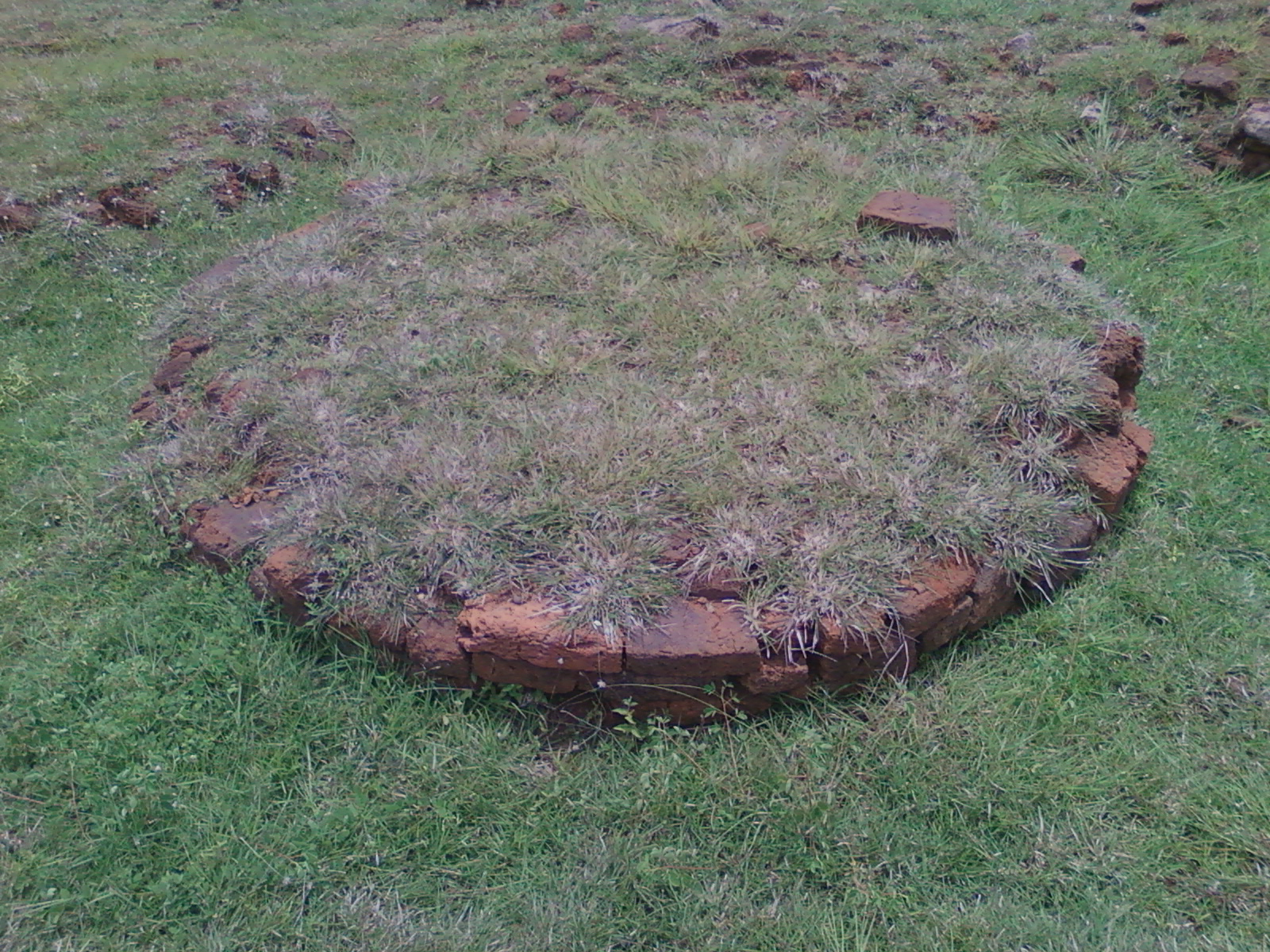
Ruins of a Votive Stupa at Pavurallakonda near Bheemunipatnam

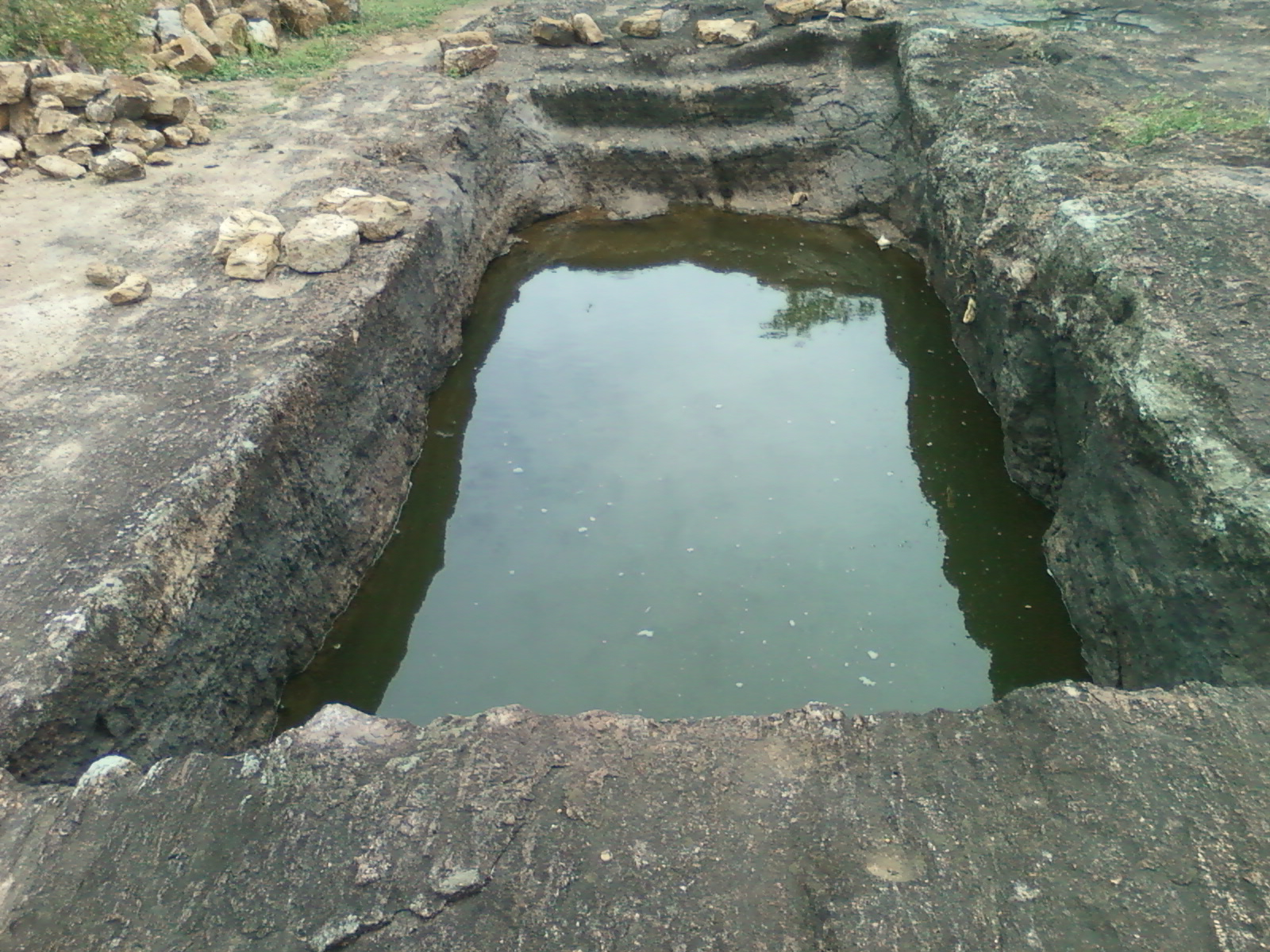
One of the 16 rock-cut cisterns at Pavurallakonda Bheemili

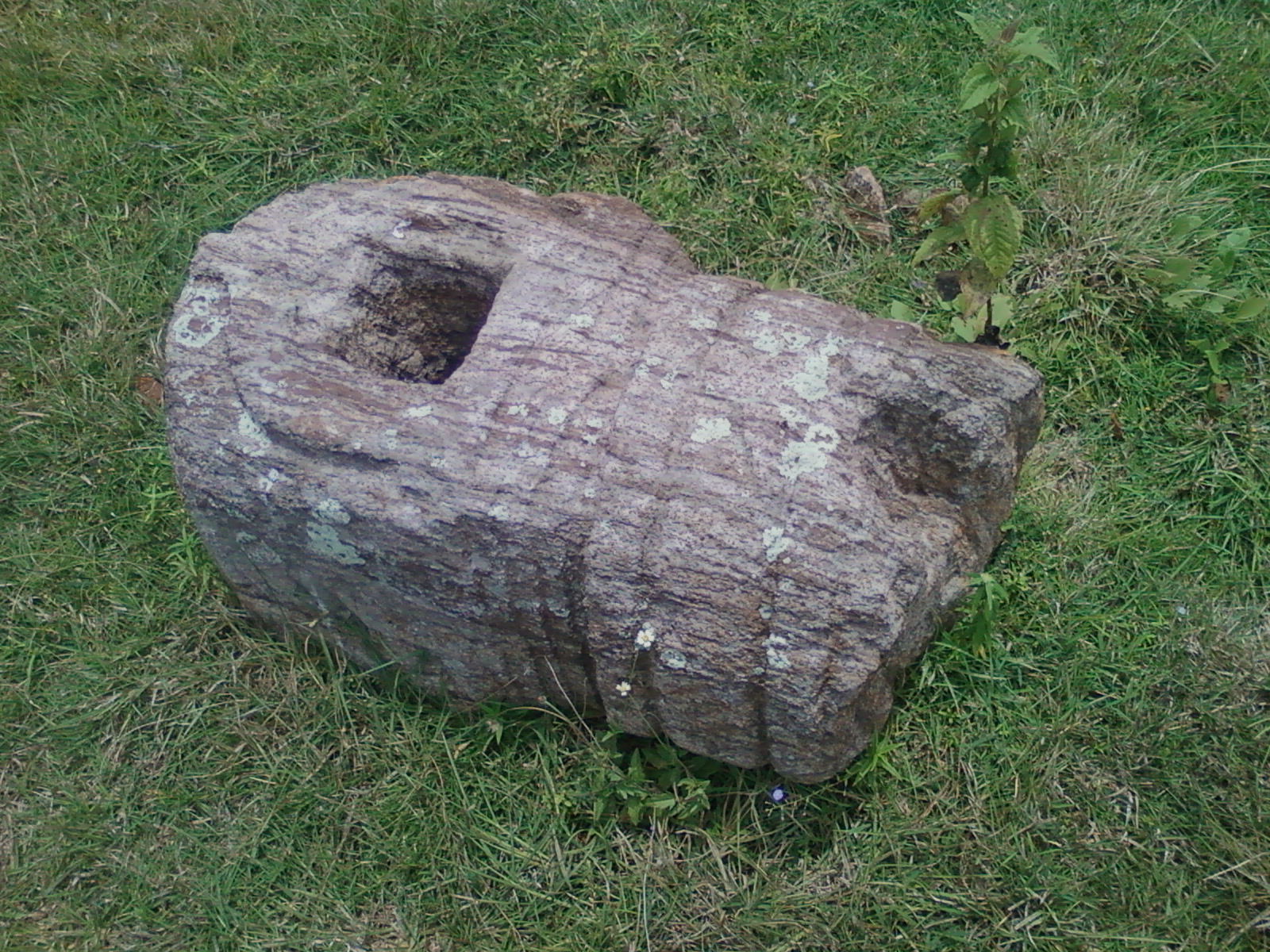
Buddhist relief Pavurallakonda Site Bheemunipatnam

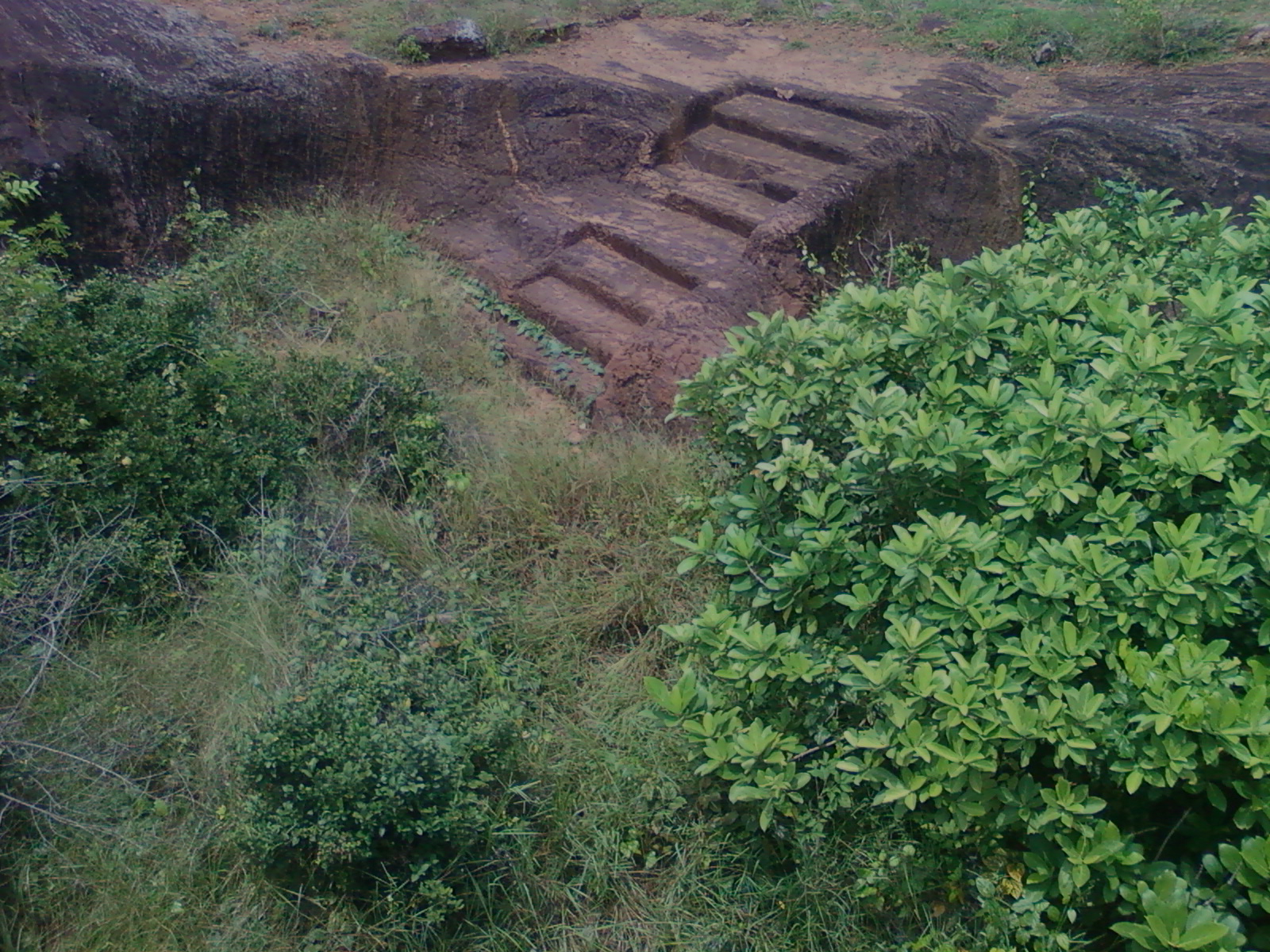
Rock-cut steps to a large cistern Pavurallakonda

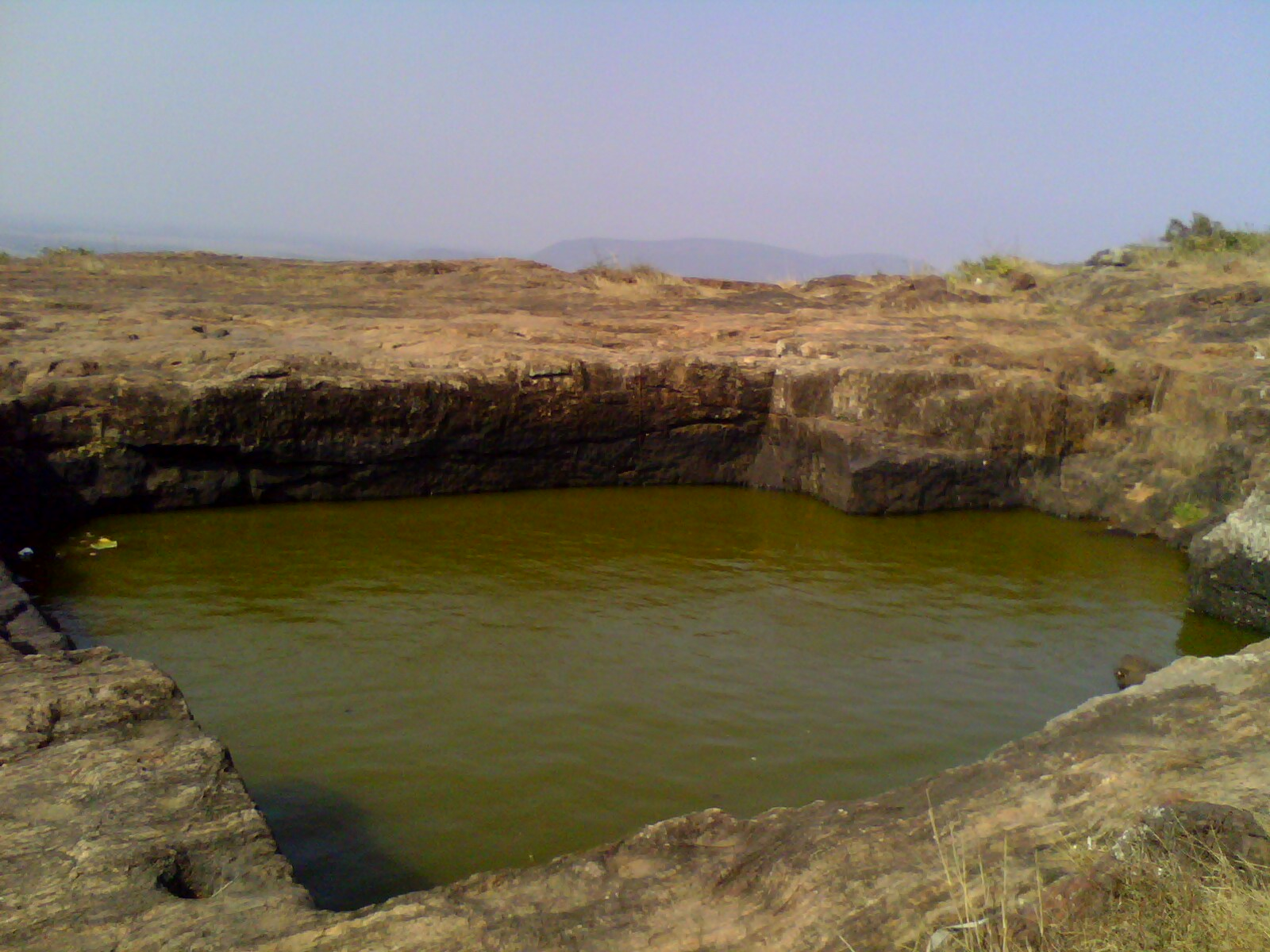
Medium-sized rock-cut cistern at Pavurallakonda

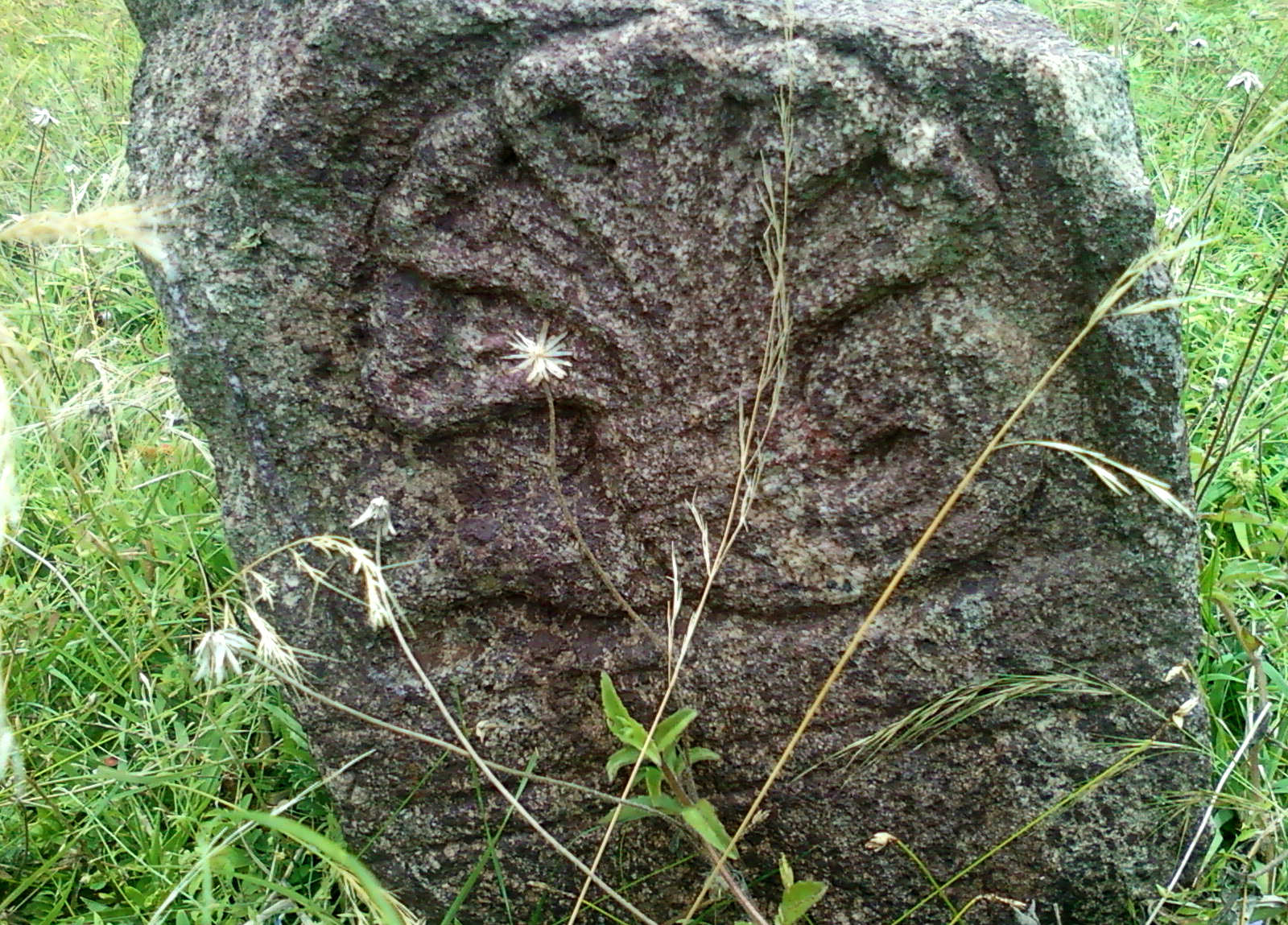
Five Headed Serpent Relief at Pavurallakonda

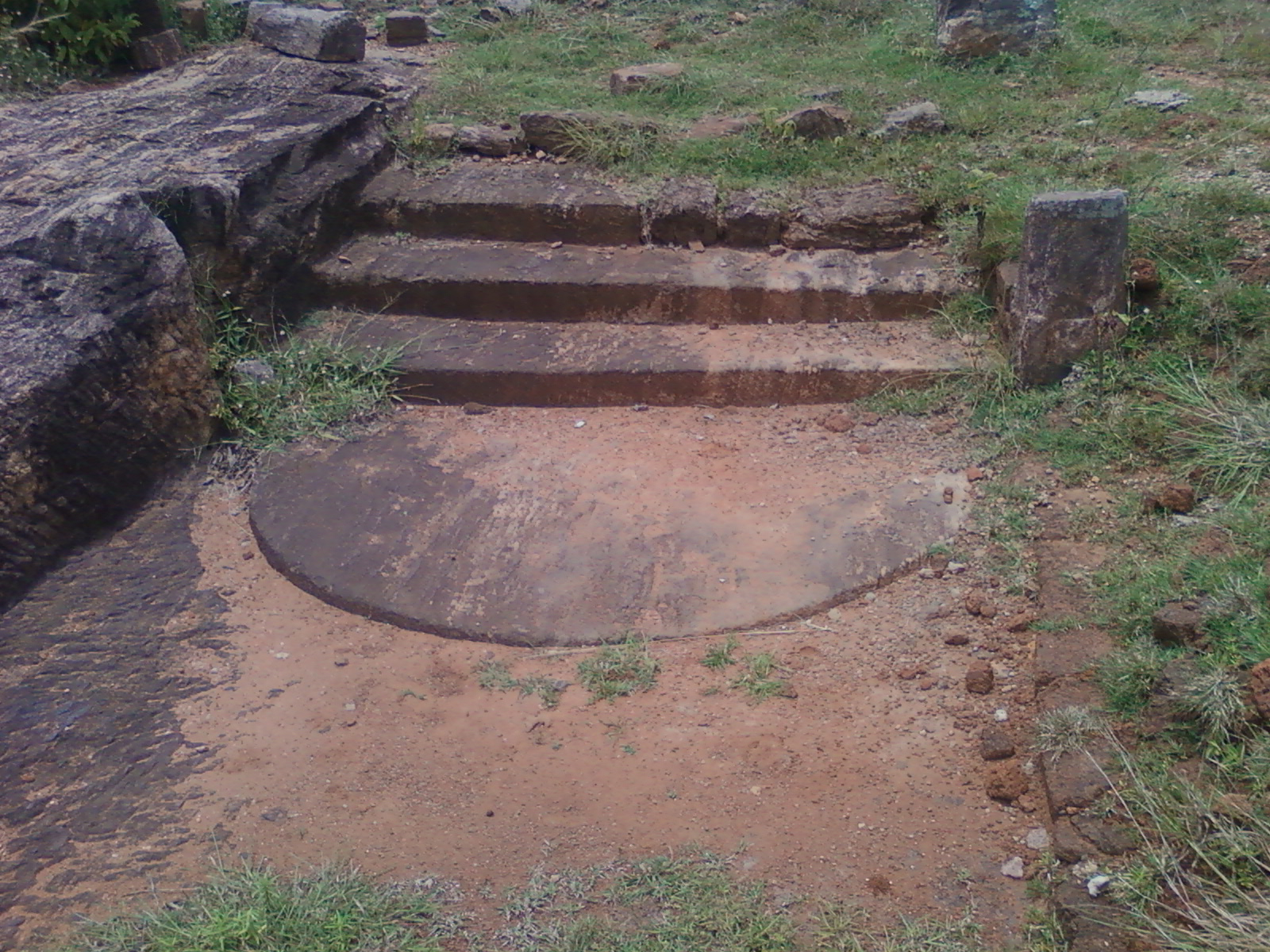
Moonstone and steps at Pavurallakonda Buddhist Ruins
