= Bheemunipatnam =

Bheemunipatnam Bheemili
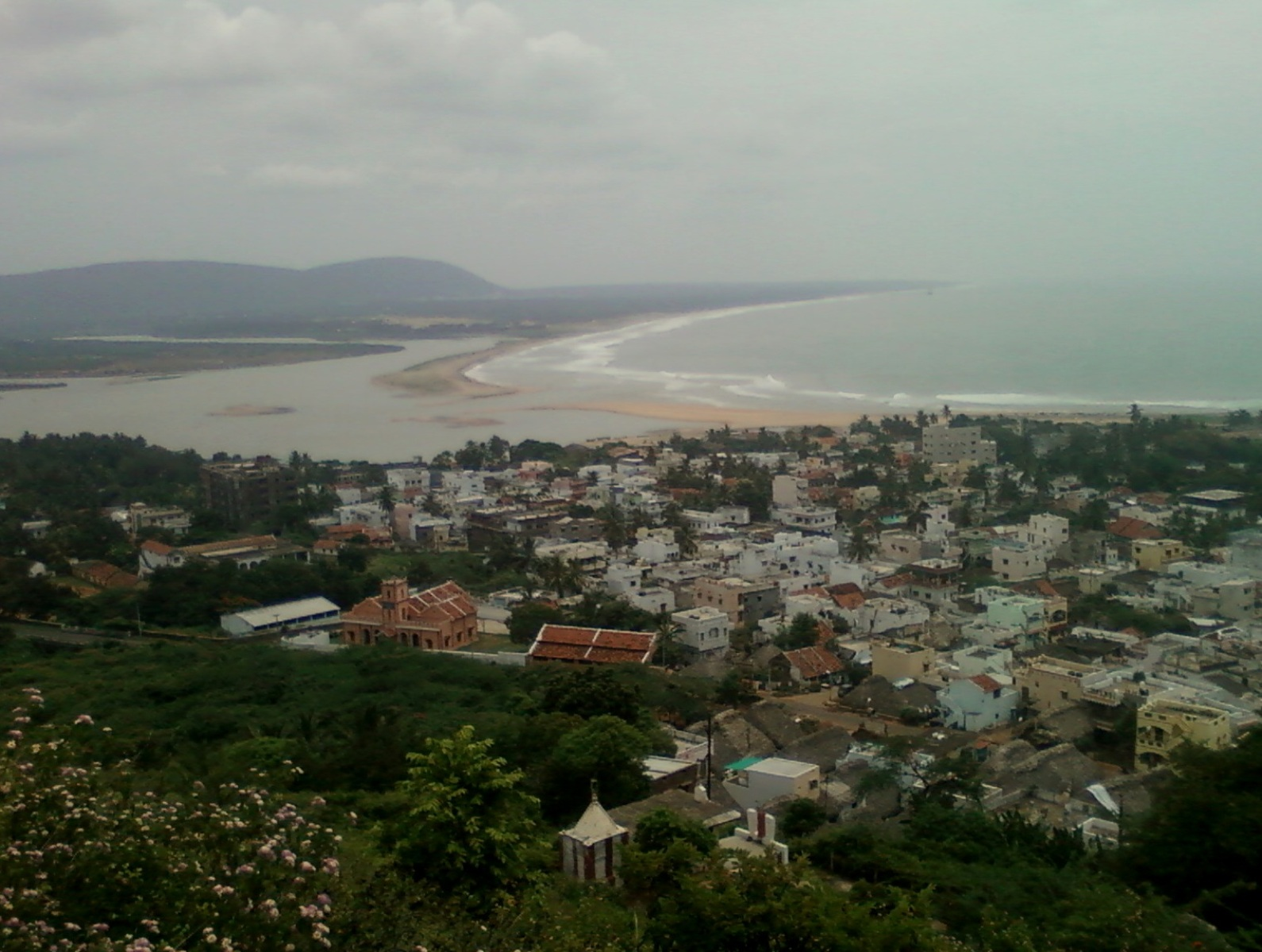
- Hill-top view of Bheemunipatnam town
- Nickname: భీమునిపట్నం
- Location in Visakhapatnam
- Coordinates: 17.884560°N 83.439342°E
- Country: India
- State: Andhra Pradesh
- District: Visakhapatnam
- City: Visakhapatnam
- Named for: Bhima

Government
  - Type: Municipal corporation
  - Body: Greater Visakhapatnam Municipal Corporation
  - MLA: Ganta Srinivasa Rao

Area
  - Total: 18.90 km^{2} (7.30 sq mi)

Population (2011)
  - Total: 55,082
  - Density: 2,914/km^{2} (7,548/sq mi)

Languages
  - Official: Telugu
- Time zone: UTC+5:30 (IST)
- PIN: 531163/62
- Vehicle Registration: AP31 (Former); AP39 (from 30 January 2019)
- Vidhan Sabha: Bheemili
- Lok Sabha constituency: Visakhapatnam

Bheemunipatnam (also known as Bheemili) is a suburb of Visakhapatnam, India. The town was named after Bhima, a character in the Hindu epic Mahabharata. It was formerly administered under the Bheemunipatnam municipality but merged into GVMC in 2017. It is currently under the administration of Bheemunipatnam Revenue Division and its headquarters is at Bheemunipatnam.

== Geography ==
Bheemunipatnam is located about 40 km from INS Dega, about 31 km from Visakhapatnam railway station, and 29 km from Visakhapatnam City Central Bus Station. It lies north of Visakhapatnam City and is loosely bordered by Rushikonda to the south, Bay of Bengal to the east, Madhurawada to the west, and Bhogapuram to the north.

== History ==
=== Buddhism ===
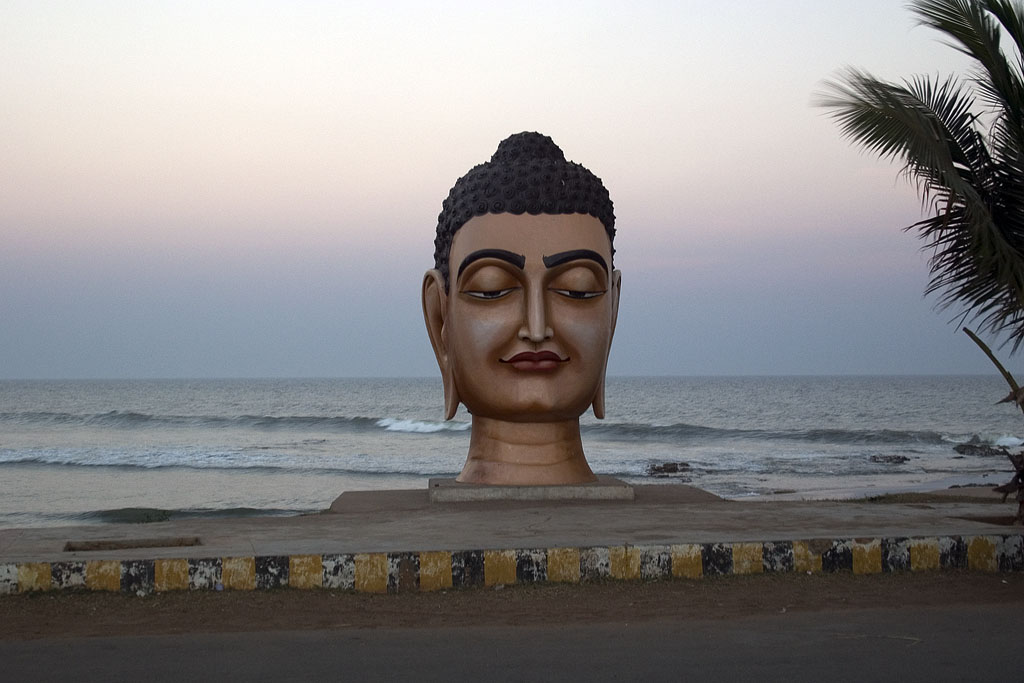
Buddha Statue at Bheemunipatnam Beach Road

Historical evidences of Buddhist Culture have been noticed at Bheemunipatnam dating back to 3rd century BCE on the hillock Pavurallakonda (also known as Narsimhaswami Konda locally) in the town. Buddhist remains were found during the excavations here along with Relic caskets. Both the schools of Buddhism Hinayana and Mahayana were propagated in this land and also to the far east lands from the port of River Gosthani. See pavurallakonda page for more details.

=== Narasimha temple ===
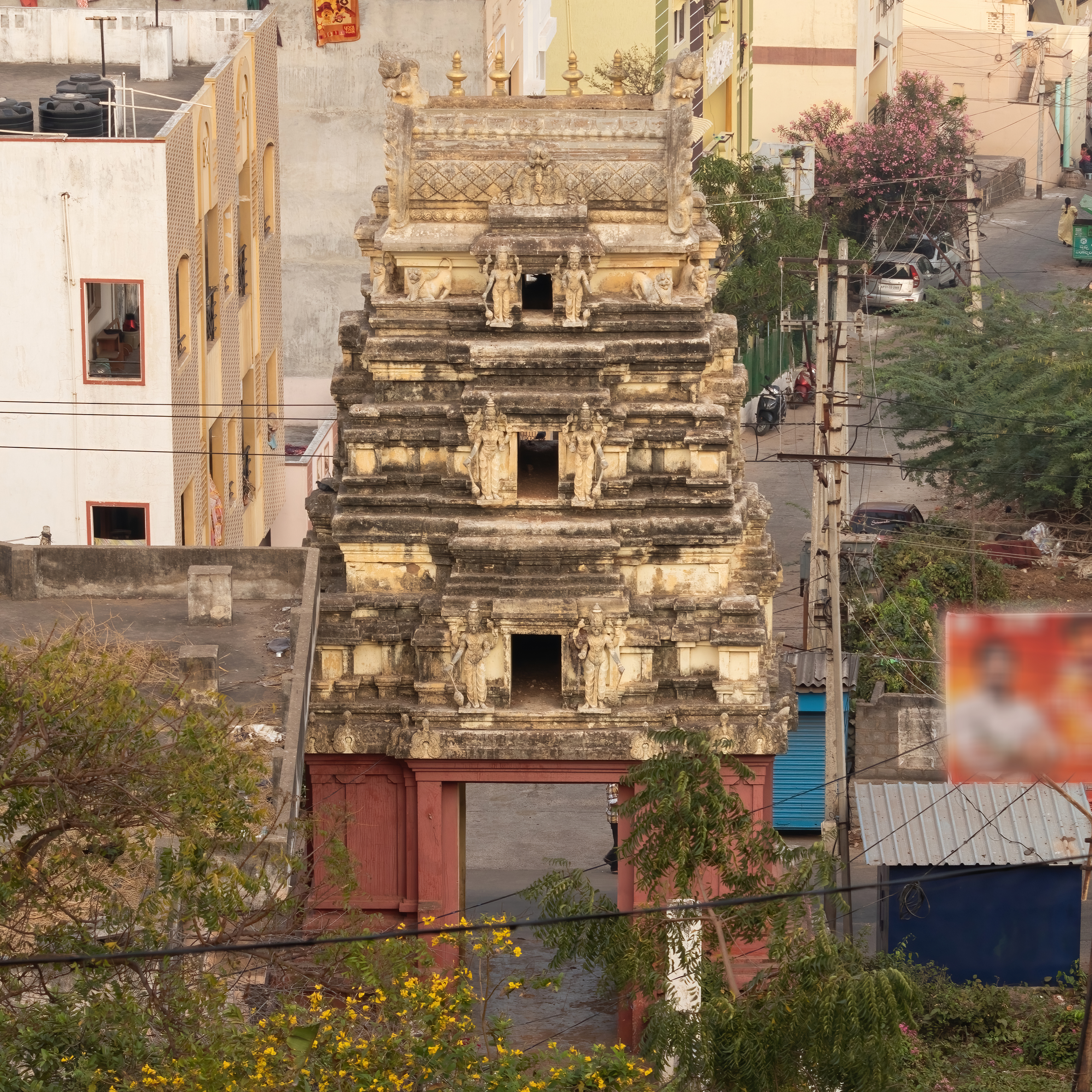
Galigopuram of Narasimha temple

There is a Hindu temple dedicated to Lord Narasimha on the eastern side of Pavurallakonda facing the sea. As per the historical evidences the temple is constructed around 14th century by Mindi Kings. There are two more temples in the town of Bhimili, which date back to the times of Chola's as Bheemeswaralayam and Choleswaralayam.

=== Dutch settlements ===
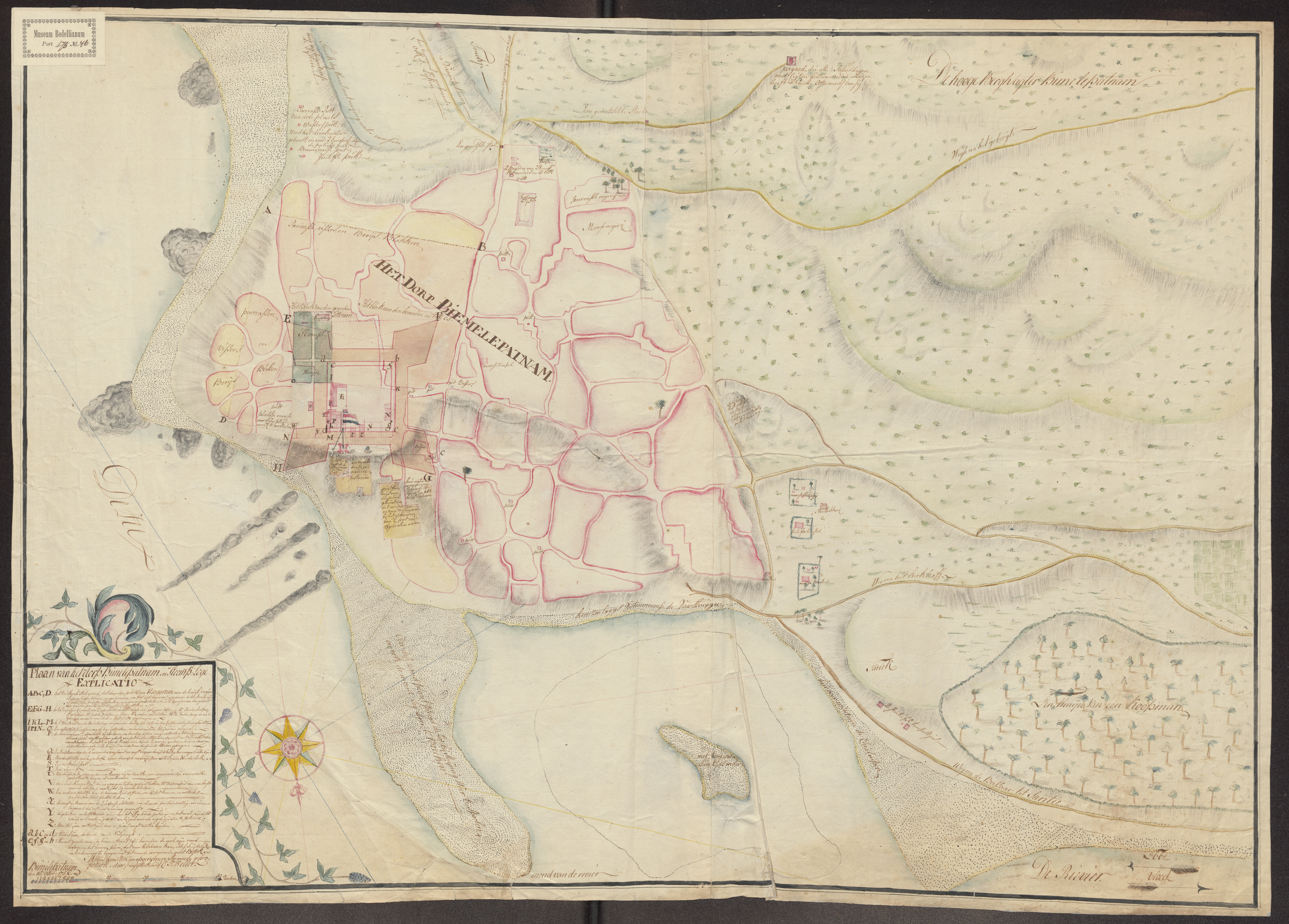
A Dutch map of Bheemunipatnam by Coenraad Pieter Keller with the projected new fort from 1756.

Known to the Dutch as Bimilipatnam, Bheemunipatnam was one among the major Dutch settlements of the Dutch Coromandel coast in the 17th century. There are remnants of the Dutch East India Company trading post when the town was a port. The town contains one of the oldest Christian cemeteries on the coast. Bhimili also had a currency mint during the times of Dutch. Portuguese also visited Bhimili in the same time as the Dutch. St.Peter's church is a historical monument which signifies the ancient architecture.

After Bheemunipatnam was plundered by Maratha troops in 1754, the local regent permitted the Dutch East India Company to construct a fort in the village, for which military engineer Coenraad Pieter Keller drew up plans. The fort that was constructed subsequently collapsed twice, for which Keller had to defend himself in front of his superiors in Batavia.

=== East India Company ===
The British East India Company made Bheemunipatnam their main trading base on the east coast. The Bhimili port used to operate passenger vessels to Madras and Calcutta during the British Raj. The big clock tower in the town was built by the British.

=== Bheemunipatnam Port Trust ===
Bheemunipatnam (Bheemili ) was one of the ancient Dutch Harbor Towns. European merchants disembarked from the ships and made it their port. It was a Major port and Europeans resided here during the East India Company regime. Until 1958, huge ships from Malaysia and Singapore arrived at this port. Perfumes, textiles, etc were exported to other countries from here. There was a huge coco plantation spread across the local beaches that was also exported. Bheemunipatnam Port Trust was closed during British rule in India to Develop Visakhapatnam Port Trust and avoid other invaders entering the country. However, the lighthouse constructed by the British at Bheemunipatnam port stands as a witness to the European regime. Nowadays Andhra Pradesh Government Wants to open the port again.

== Demographics ==
According to Imperial Gazetteer of India, It was entirely Zamindari land belonging to the Vizianagram estate. As of 2001 India census, it had a population of 44,156. Males constitute 49% of the population and females 51%. Bheemunipatnam has an average literacy rate of 60%, higher than the national average of 59.5%; with male literacy of 67% and female literacy of 54%. 11% of the population is under 6 years of age.

== Landmarks ==
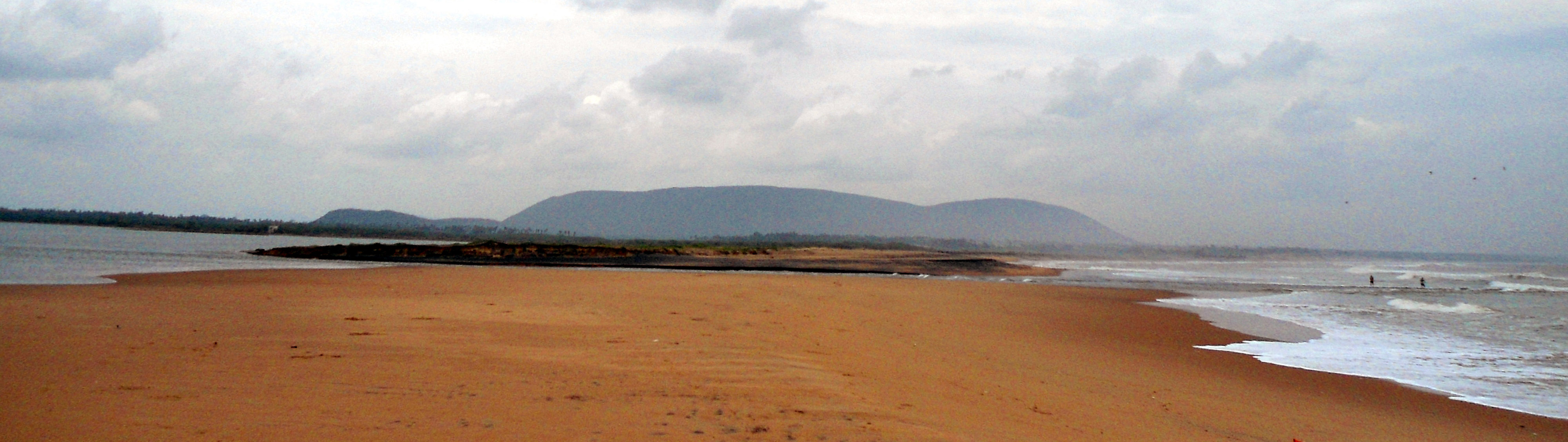
Panoramic view of River Gosthani confluence into Bay of Bengal at Bhimili

The lighthouse dated to 1868 was built during Dutch settlement on the shores of Bheemili Beach. Some of the Buddhist sites are Bojjannakonda, Bavikonda, Lingalakonda, Pavurallakonda, Salihundam and Thotlakonda.

== Member Of Legislative Assembly ==
Year	Candidate	Party
1951	Kaligotla Suryanarayana	
1955	Gottumukkala Jagannadha Raju	
1972	Raja Sagi Soma Sundara Suryanarayana Raju	INC
1978	Datla Jagannadha Raju	INC(I)
1983	Pusapati Ananda Gajapati Raju	TDP
1985	Raja Sagi Devi Prasanna Appala Narasimha Raju	TDP
1989	Raja Sagi Devi Prasanna Appala Narasimha Raju	TDP
1994	Raja Sagi Devi Prasanna Appala Narasimha Raju	TDP
1999	Raja Sagi Devi Prasanna Appala Narasimha Raju	TDP
2004	Karri Seetharamu	INC
2009	Muttamsetti Srinivasa Rao	PRP
2014	Ganta Srinivasa Rao	TDP
2019	Muttamsetti Srinivasa Rao	YSRCP
2024	Ganta Srinivasa Rao	TDP

== Bheemili Municipality (GVMC) ==
Year	Candidate	Ward	Ward Name	Party
2021	Akramani Padmavati Naidu	1	Tagarapuvalasa Bheemili Urban	YSRCP
2021	Gadu Chinni Kumari Lakshmi (Ex-Chairman, BMC)	2	Sangivalasa Bheemili Urban	TDP
2021	Ganta Appalakonda	3	Bheemili Town	TDP
2021	D Konda Babu	4	Bheemili Rural	YSRCP
