= Bavikonda =

- Protected Buddhist monument complex
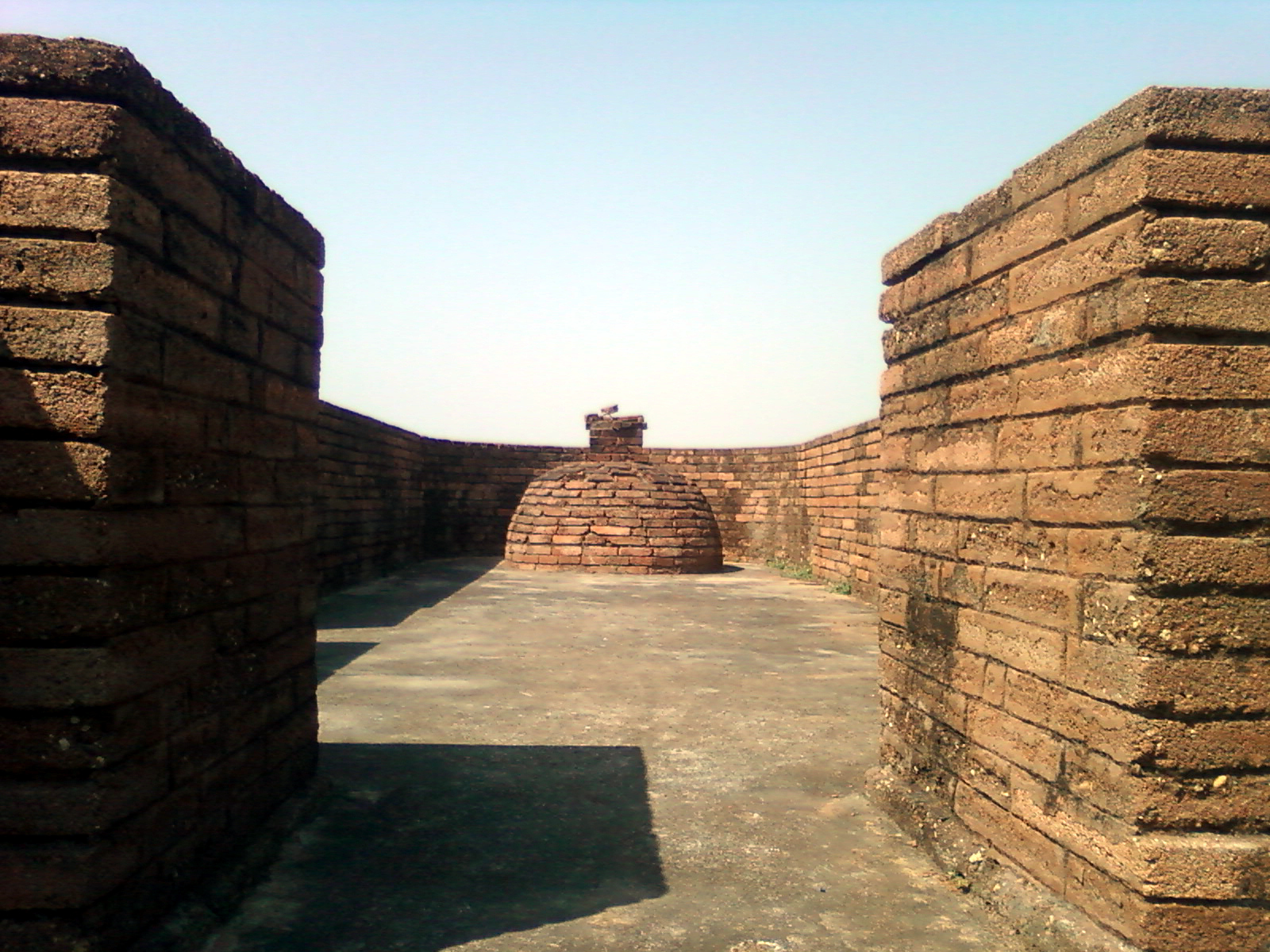
- Apsidal Stupa at Bavikonda

- Location in Visakhapatnam, India
- Coordinates: 17°49′2″N 83°23′27″E
- Country: India
- State: Andhra Pradesh
- District: Visakhapatnam

Languages
  - Official: Telugu
- Time zone: UTC+5:30 (IST)
- Vehicle registration: AP
- Nearest city: Visakhapatnam

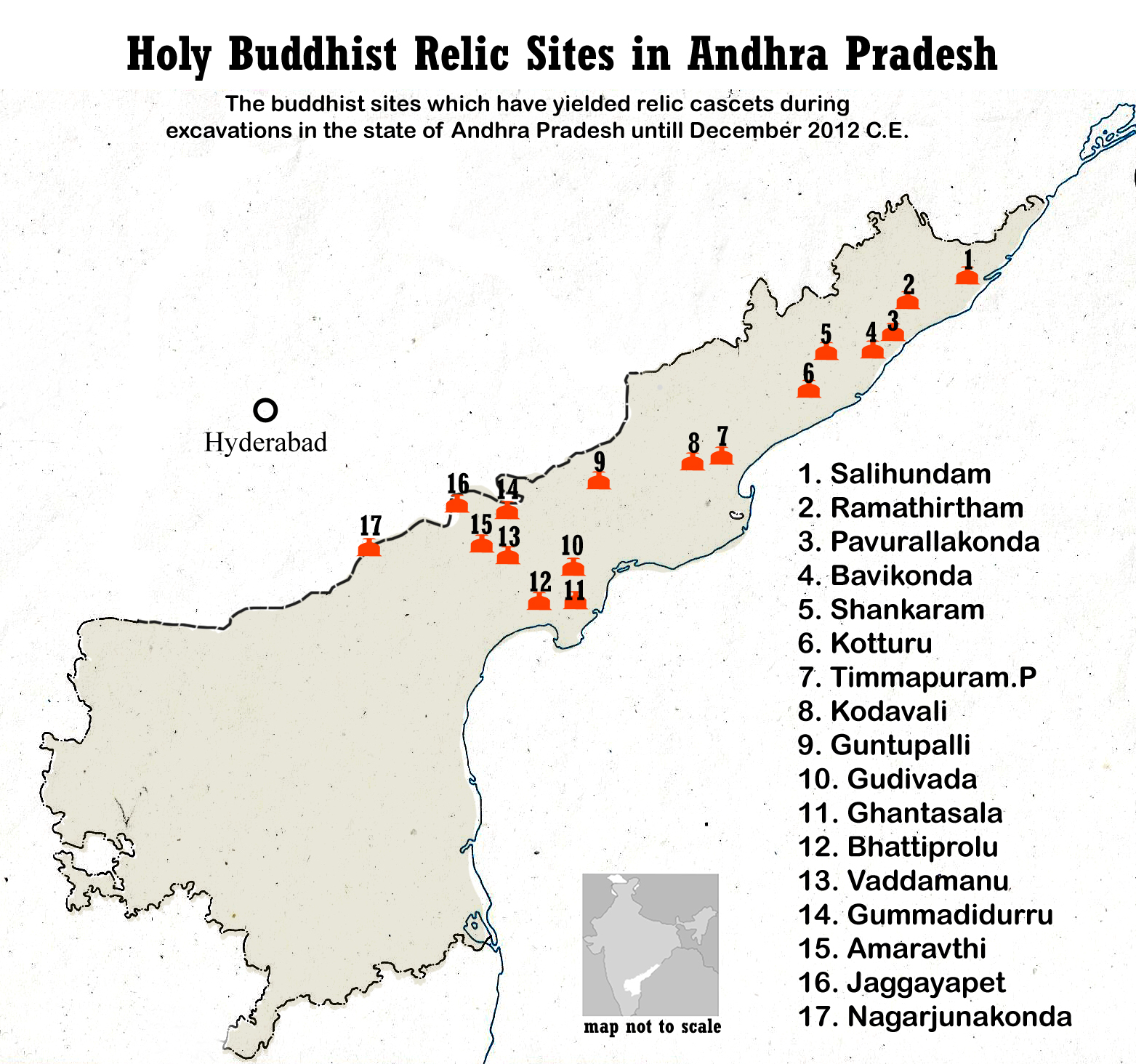
Holy relic sites map of Andhra Pradesh

Bavikonda Buddhist Complex lies about 16 km from Visakhapatnam, in the Indian state of Andhra Pradesh, on a hill about 130 metres above mean sea level. The term Bavikonda in Telugu means a hill of wells. As per its name, Bavikonda is a hill which has wells for the collection of rainwater. Bavikonda Monastic ruins dates back to the 3rd century BCE.

A large Buddhist complex was excavated at this site. The excavated remnants are as follows:

- A piece of bone stored in an urn, supposed to be one of the remains of the Buddha,
- Inscriptions,
- Pottery,
- Relic caskets,
- Tiles,
- Bricks,
- Coins etc.

were recovered here by the State archaeological department.

The Buddhist sites of Thotlakonda and Pavurallakonda are situated close by.

== Gallery ==
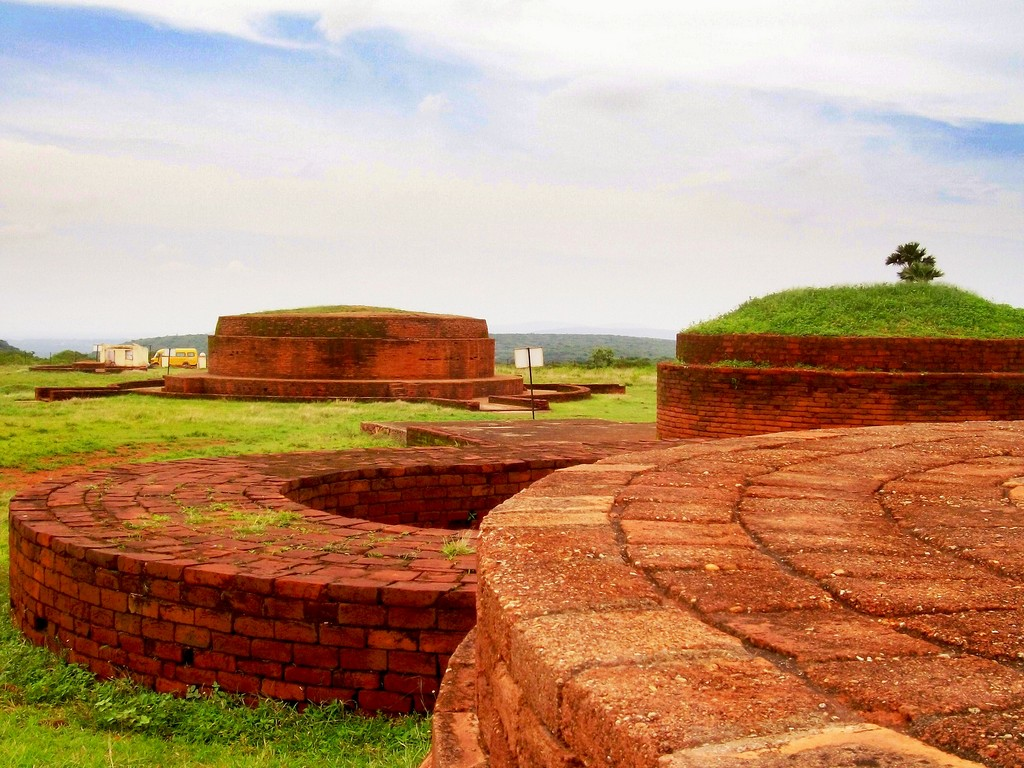
Bavikonda stupas Visakhapatnam

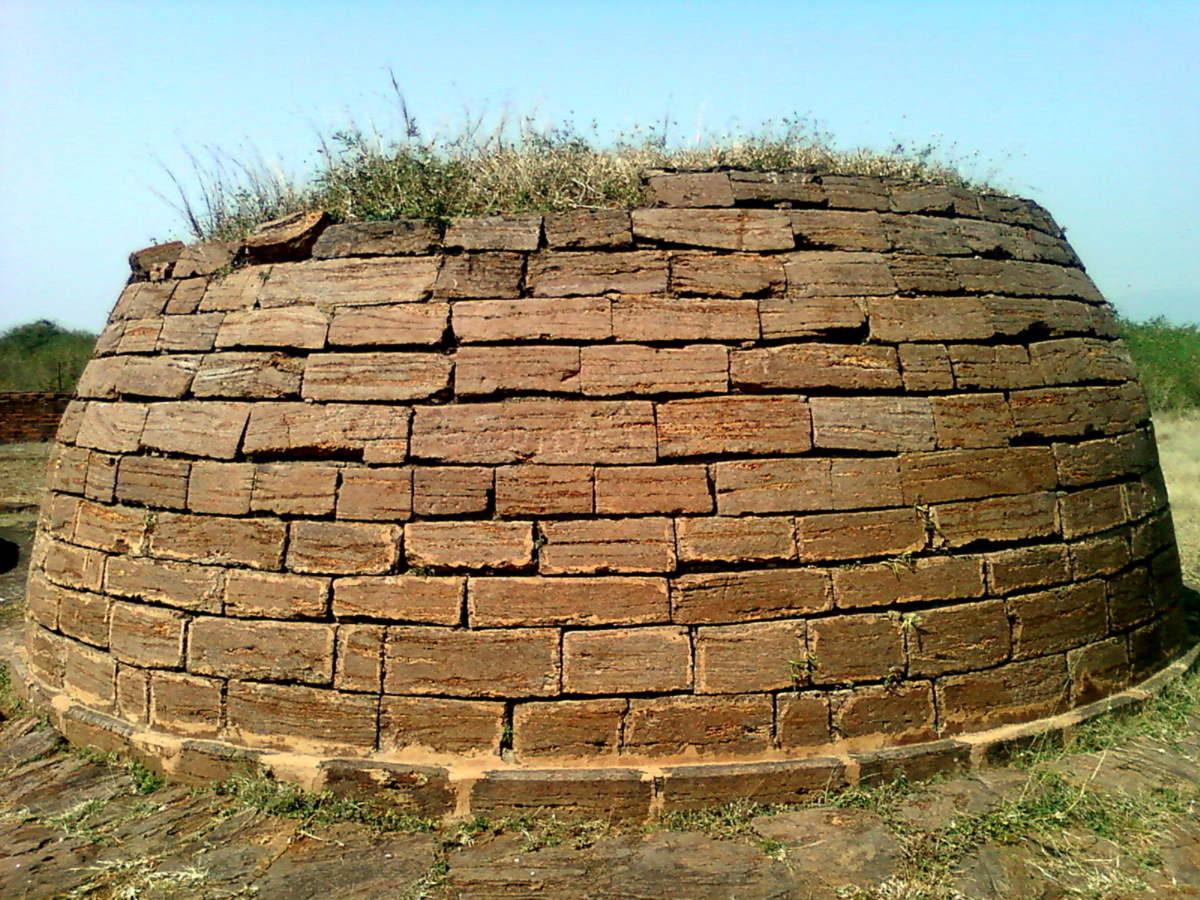
A stone stupa at Bavikonda

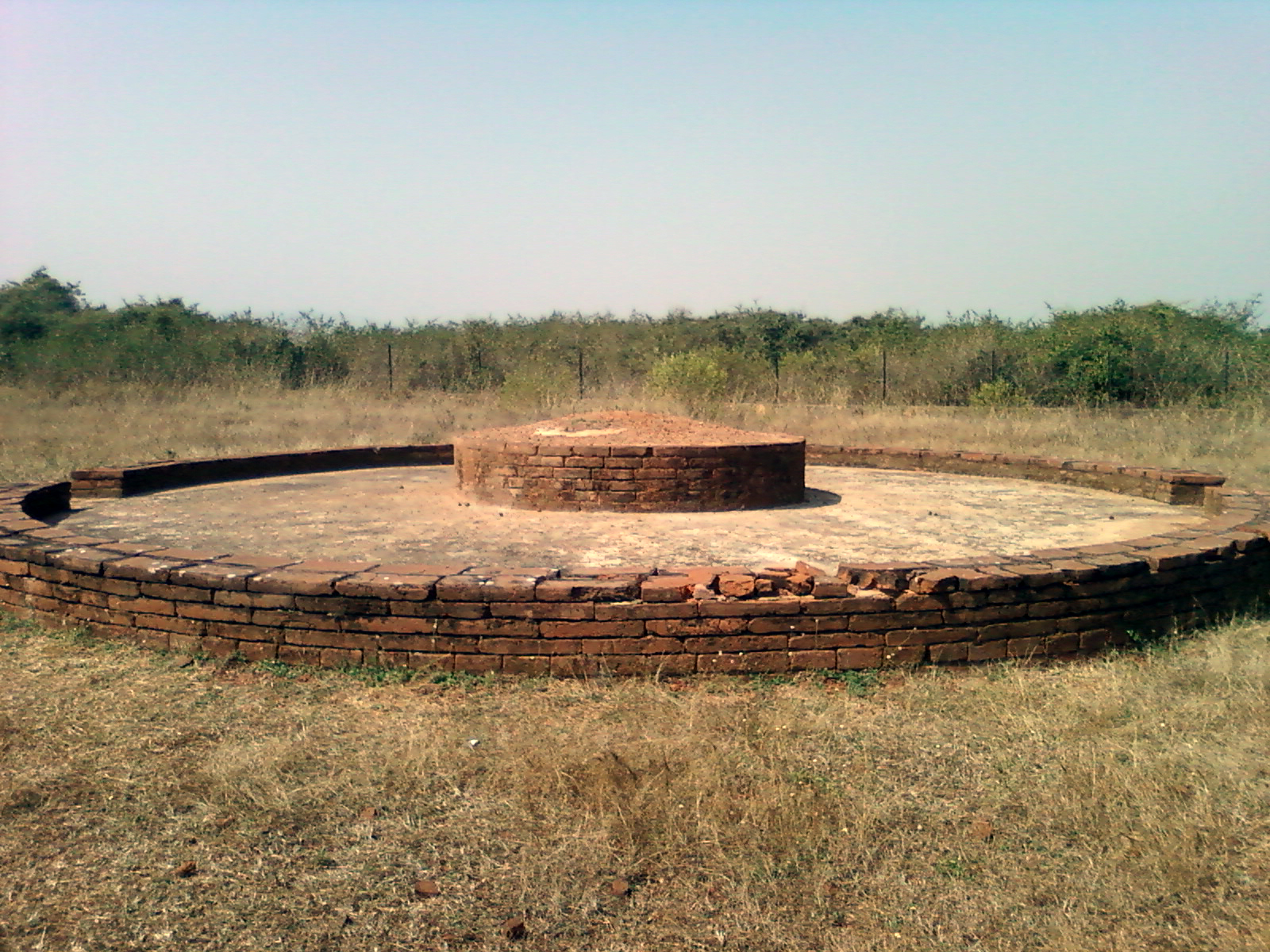
Stupa at Bavikonda near Visakhapatnam

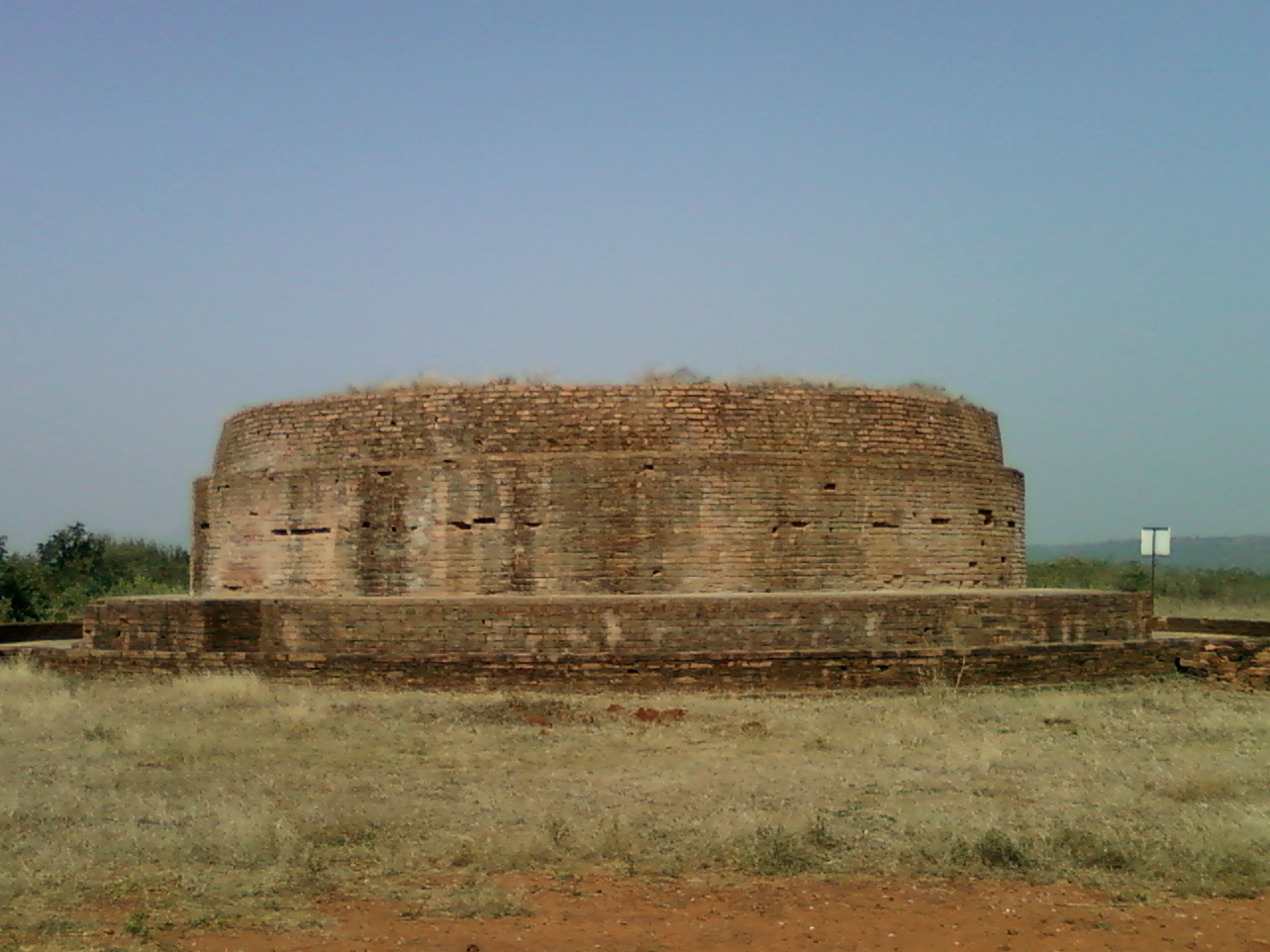
Bavikonda Mahastupa Visakhapatnam

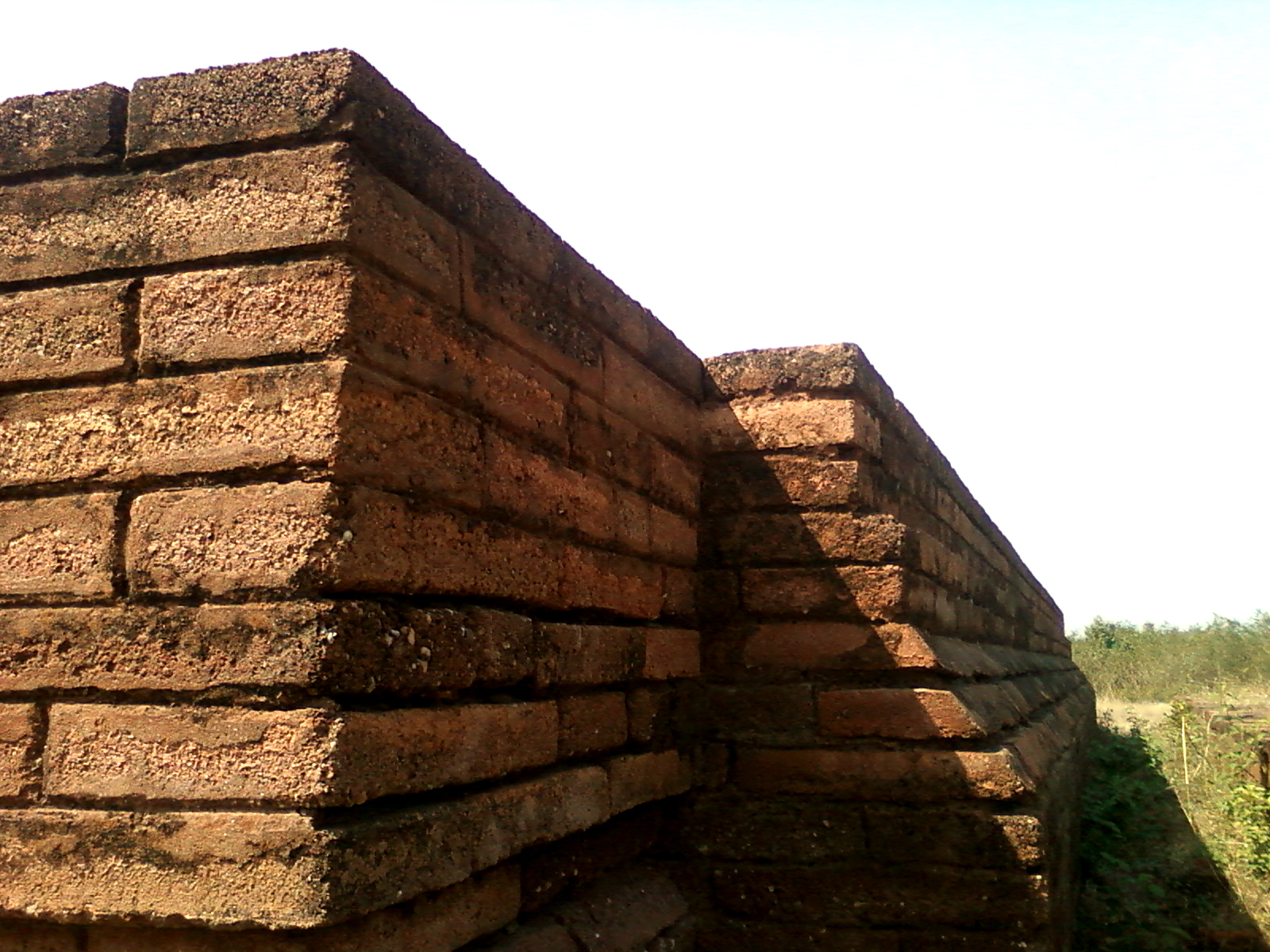
Walls of Apsidal stupa at Bavikonda

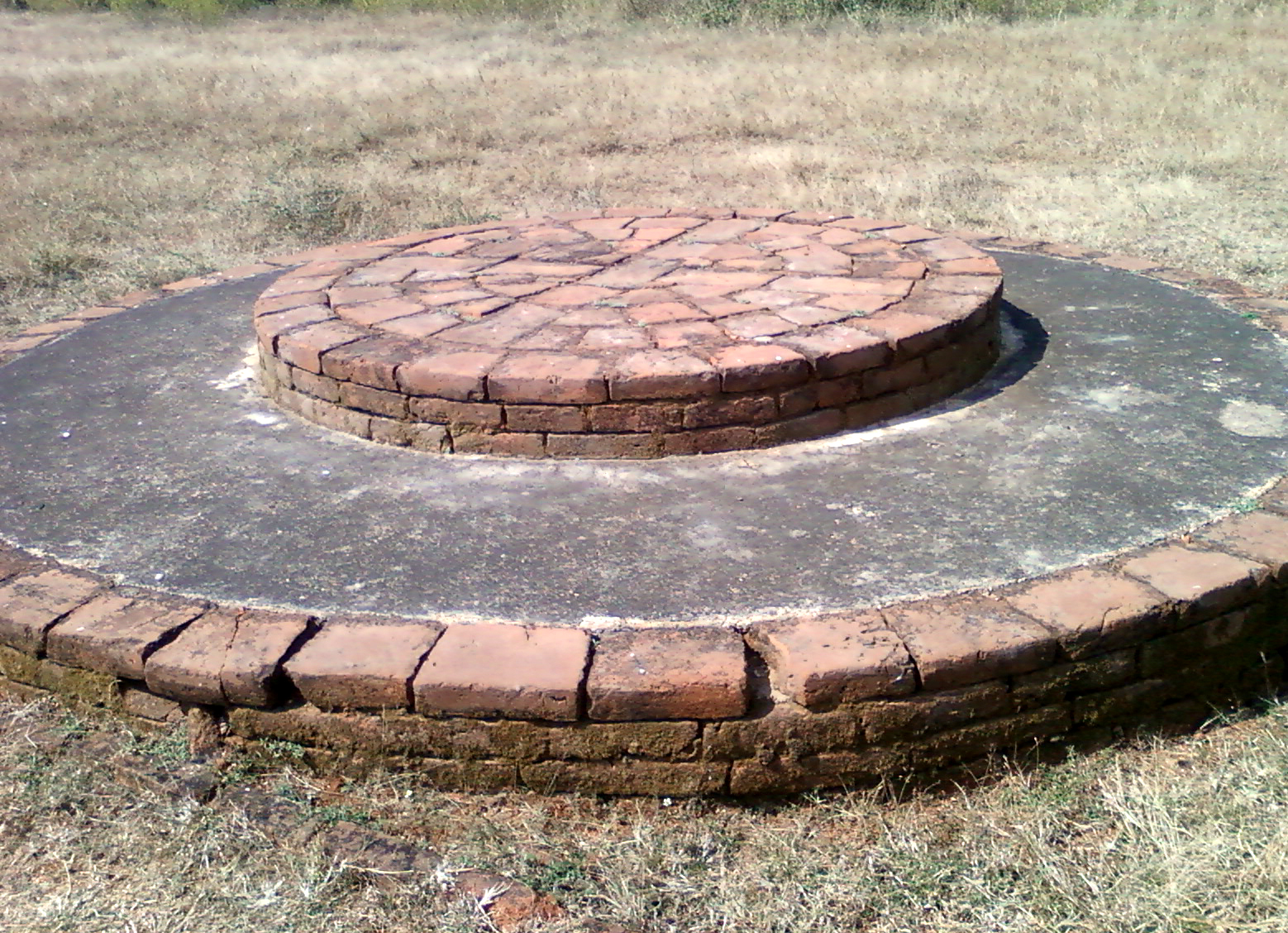
Votive Stupa at Bavikonda Visakhapatnam

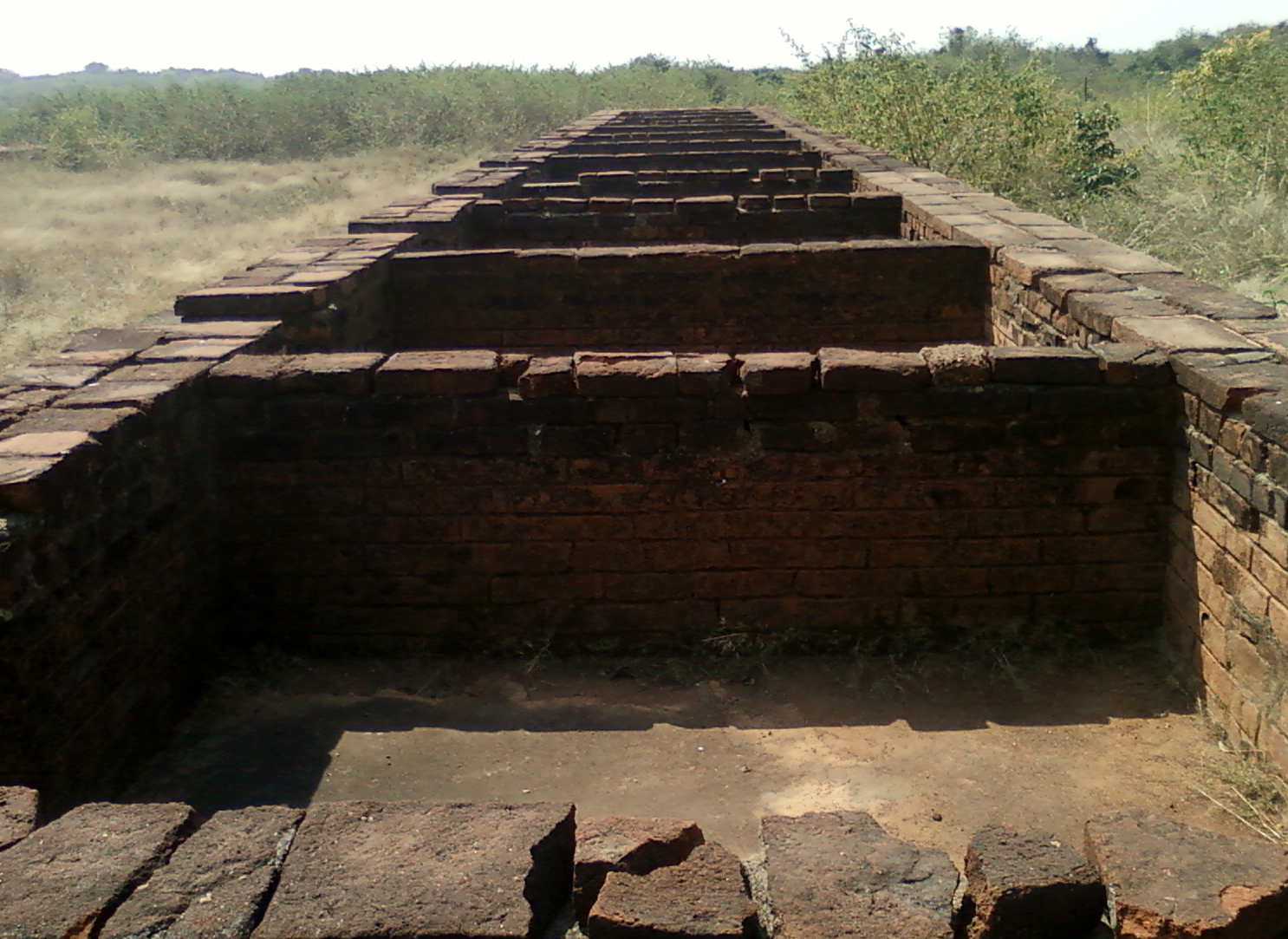
Vihara at Bavikonda Visakhapatnam

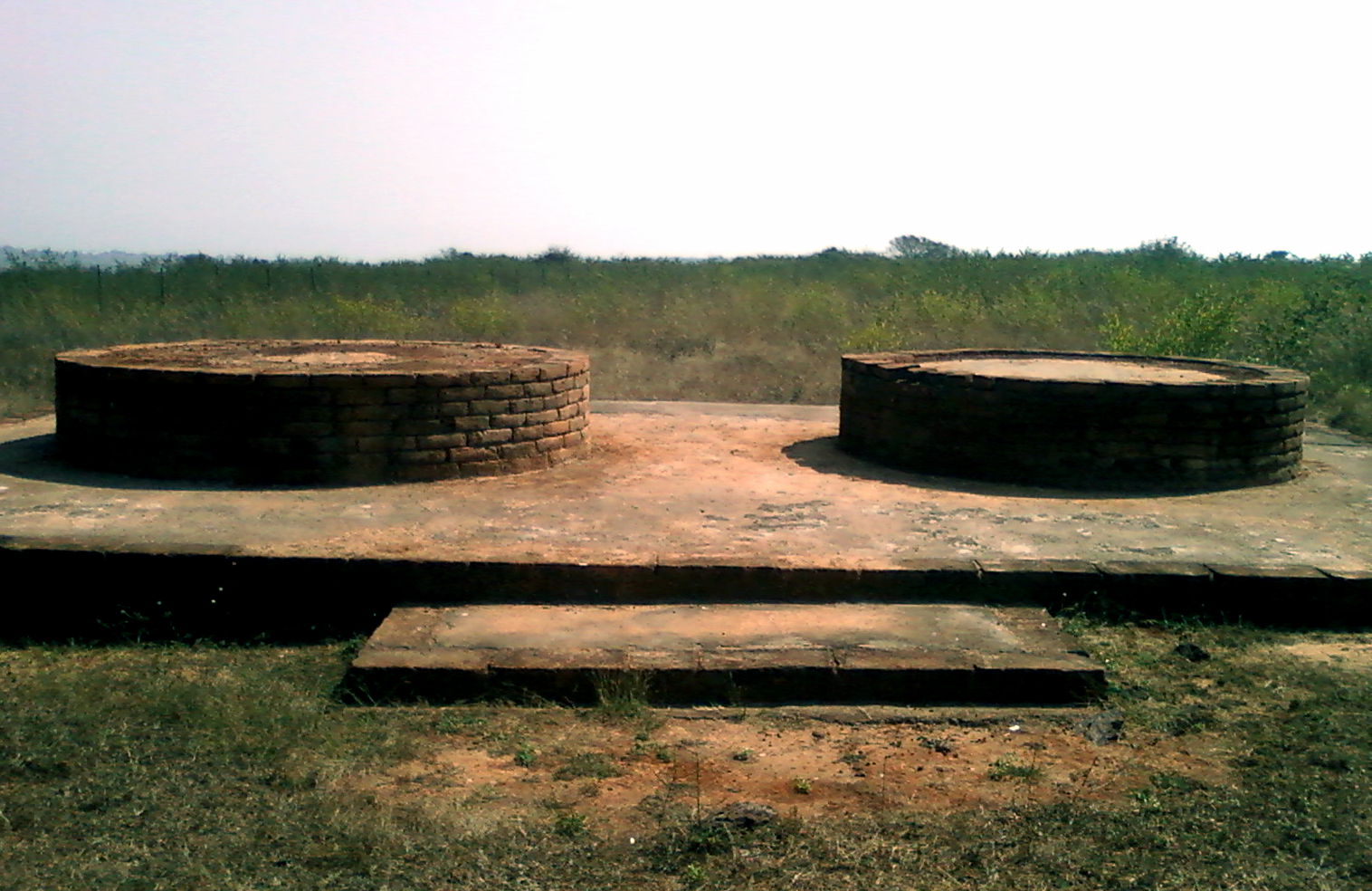
Votive stupas at Bavikonda

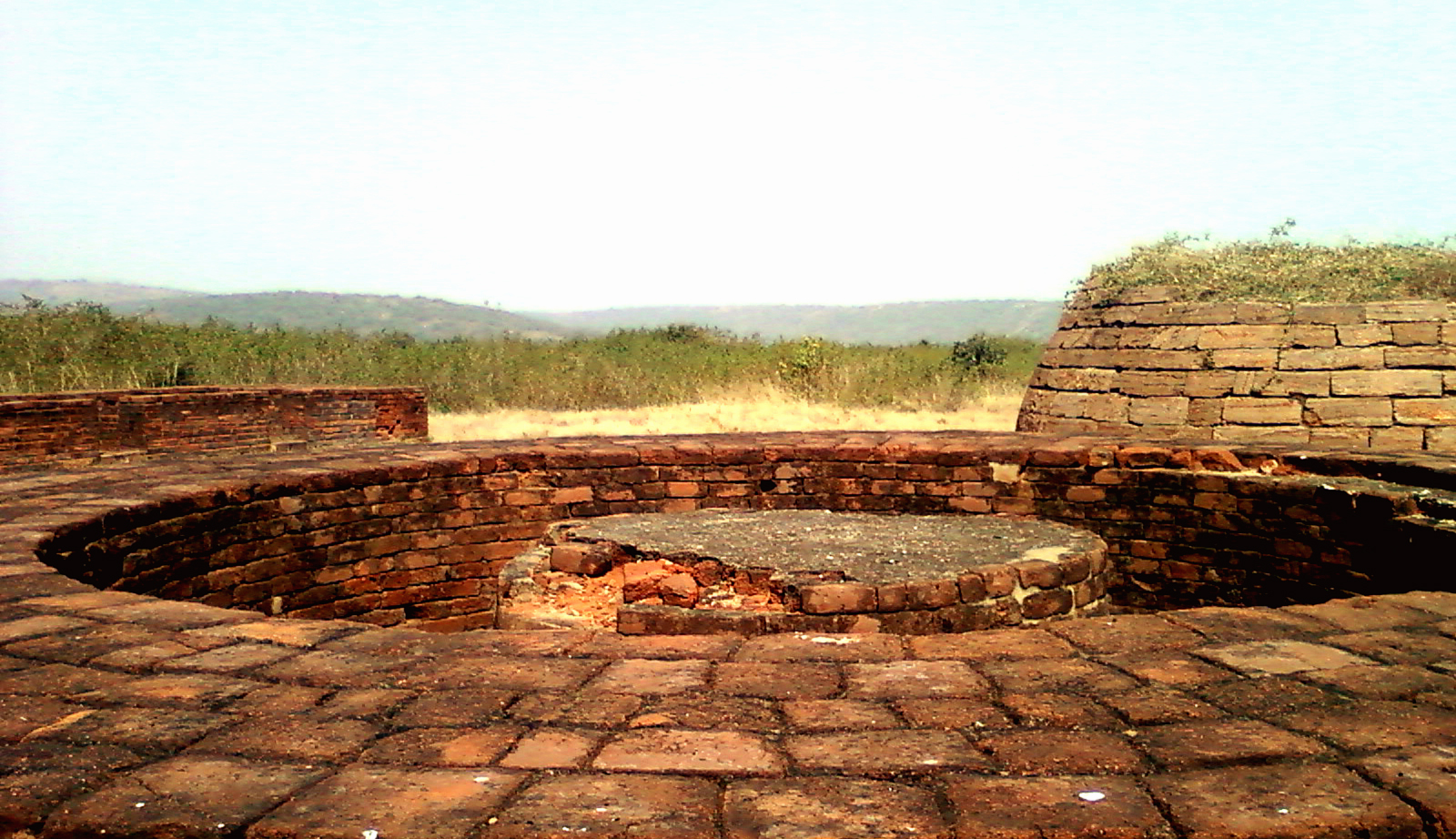
View at Bavikonda in Visakhapatnam

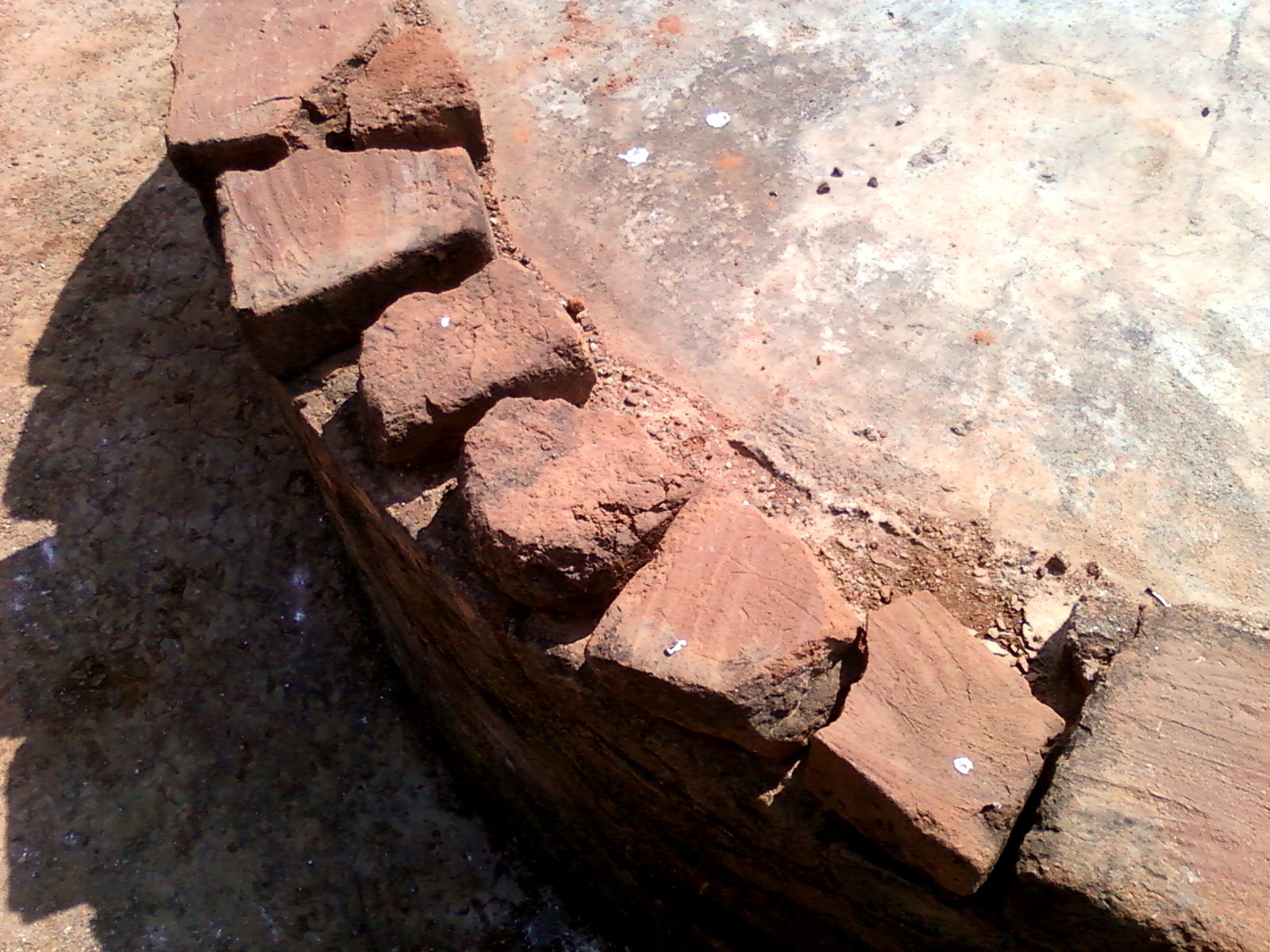
Bricks on a votive stupa at Bavikonda
