= List of mandals of Andhra Pradesh =

A mandal is an administrative area in Andhra Pradesh and Telangana.

It is equivalent to Taluk/Tehsil of other states in India.

Each mandal is administered by a Mandal Revenue Officer (MRO) (erstwhile known as Tahsildar).

== History ==
The mandal system was introduced as an administrative reform to make governance more efficient by reducing the size of the larger, previously existing taluks. The decentralization aimed at improving revenue administration, record-keeping, and enhancing the reach of the panchayati raj system. As part of the middle tier of the panchayati raj structure, mandals replaced the former panchayat samitis in Andhra Pradesh during the tenure of the Telugu Desam Party government led by N. T. Rama Rao on May 25, 1985. The reform was inspired by the recommendations of the Ashok Mehta Committee.

The expectation was that the division of large taluks into smaller mandals would lead to more manageable administrative units and allow closer oversight of the revenue administration by the state government. Each taluk generally comprises four to five mandals, forming more localized sub-units within districts.

== Mandals ==
This table lists all the mandals in the 28 districts of Andhra Pradesh. The state comprises 688 mandals following district restructuring in 2025.

Note: Use the sort option to view mandals in alphabetical order.

Mandal	Revenue Division	District	
Ananthagiri mandal	Paderu revenue division	Alluri Sitharama Raju district	
Araku Valley mandal	Paderu revenue division	Alluri Sitharama Raju district	
Chintapalle mandal	Paderu revenue division	Alluri Sitharama Raju district	
Dumbriguda mandal	Paderu revenue division	Alluri Sitharama Raju district	
G. Madugula mandal	Paderu revenue division	Alluri Sitharama Raju district	
Gudem Kotha Veedhi mandal	Paderu revenue division	Alluri Sitharama Raju district	
Hukumpeta mandal	Paderu revenue division	Alluri Sitharama Raju district	
Koyyuru mandal	Paderu revenue division	Alluri Sitharama Raju district	
Munchingi Puttu mandal	Paderu revenue division	Alluri Sitharama Raju district	
Paderu mandal	Paderu revenue division	Alluri Sitharama Raju district	
Peda Bayalu mandal	Paderu revenue division	Alluri Sitharama Raju district	
Atchutapuram mandal	Adduroad Junction revenue division	Anakapalli district	
Elamanchili mandal	Adduroad Junction revenue division	Anakapalli district	
Kotauratla mandal	Adduroad Junction revenue division	Anakapalli district	
Nakkapalle mandal	Adduroad Junction revenue division	Anakapalli district	
Payakaraopeta mandal	Adduroad Junction revenue division	Anakapalli district	
Rambilli mandal	Adduroad Junction revenue division	Anakapalli district	
Sarvasiddhi Rayavaram mandal	Adduroad Junction revenue division	Anakapalli district	
Anakapalli mandal	Anakapalli revenue division	Anakapalli district	
Butchayyapeta mandal	Anakapalli revenue division	Anakapalli district	
Cheedikada mandal	Anakapalli revenue division	Anakapalli district	
Chodavaram mandal	Anakapalli revenue division	Anakapalli district	
Devarapalli mandal	Anakapalli revenue division	Anakapalli district	
K. Kotapadu mandal	Anakapalli revenue division	Anakapalli district	
Kasimkota mandal	Anakapalli revenue division	Anakapalli district	
Munagapaka mandal	Anakapalli revenue division	Anakapalli district	
Paravada mandal	Anakapalli revenue division	Anakapalli district	
Sabbavaram mandal	Anakapalli revenue division	Anakapalli district	
Golugonda mandal	Narasipatnam revenue division	Anakapalli district	
Madugula mandal	Narasipatnam revenue division	Anakapalli district	
Makavarapalem mandal	Narasipatnam revenue division	Anakapalli district	
Narsipatnam mandal	Narasipatnam revenue division	Anakapalli district	
Nathavaram mandal	Narasipatnam revenue division	Anakapalli district	
Ravikamatham mandal	Narasipatnam revenue division	Anakapalli district	
Rolugunta mandal	Narasipatnam revenue division	Anakapalli district	
Anantapur Rural mandal	Ananthapuramu revenue division	Ananthapuramu district	
Anantapur Urban mandal	Ananthapuramu revenue division	Ananthapuramu district	
Atmakur mandal	Ananthapuramu revenue division	Ananthapuramu district	
Bukkaraya Samudram mandal	Ananthapuramu revenue division	Ananthapuramu district	
Garladinne mandal	Ananthapuramu revenue division	Ananthapuramu district	
Kudair mandal	Ananthapuramu revenue division	Ananthapuramu district	
Narpala mandal	Ananthapuramu revenue division	Ananthapuramu district	
Peddapappur mandal	Ananthapuramu revenue division	Ananthapuramu district	
Putlur mandal	Ananthapuramu revenue division	Ananthapuramu district	
Raptadu mandal	Ananthapuramu revenue division	Ananthapuramu district	
Singanamala mandal	Ananthapuramu revenue division	Ananthapuramu district	
Tadipatri mandal	Ananthapuramu revenue division	Ananthapuramu district	
Yellanur mandal	Ananthapuramu revenue division	Ananthapuramu district	
Gooty mandal	Guntakal revenue division	Ananthapuramu district	
Guntakal mandal	Guntakal revenue division	Ananthapuramu district	
Pamidi mandal	Guntakal revenue division	Ananthapuramu district	
Peddavadugur mandal	Guntakal revenue division	Ananthapuramu district	
Uravakonda mandal	Guntakal revenue division	Ananthapuramu district	
Vajrakarur mandal	Guntakal revenue division	Ananthapuramu district	
Vidapanakal mandal	Guntakal revenue division	Ananthapuramu district	
Yadiki mandal	Guntakal revenue division	Ananthapuramu district	
Beluguppa mandal	Kalyandurgam revenue division	Ananthapuramu district	
Bommanahal mandal	Kalyandurgam revenue division	Ananthapuramu district	
Brahmasamudram mandal	Kalyandurgam revenue division	Ananthapuramu district	
D.Hirehal mandal	Kalyandurgam revenue division	Ananthapuramu district	
Gummagatta mandal	Kalyandurgam revenue division	Ananthapuramu district	
Kalyandurg mandal	Kalyandurgam revenue division	Ananthapuramu district	
Kambadur mandal	Kalyandurgam revenue division	Ananthapuramu district	
Kanekal mandal	Kalyandurgam revenue division	Ananthapuramu district	
Kundurpi mandal	Kalyandurgam revenue division	Ananthapuramu district	
Rayadurg mandal	Kalyandurgam revenue division	Ananthapuramu district	
Settur mandal	Kalyandurgam revenue division	Ananthapuramu district	
Beerangi Kothakota mandal	Madanapalle revenue division	Annamayya district	
Chowdepalle mandal	Madanapalle revenue division	Annamayya district	
Kurabalakota mandal	Madanapalle revenue division	Annamayya district	
Madanapalle mandal	Madanapalle revenue division	Annamayya district	
Mulakalacheruvu mandal	Madanapalle revenue division	Annamayya district	
Nimmanapalle mandal	Madanapalle revenue division	Annamayya district	
Peddamandyam mandal	Madanapalle revenue division	Annamayya district	
Peddathippasamudram mandal	Madanapalle revenue division	Annamayya district	
Punganur mandal	Madanapalle revenue division	Annamayya district	
Ramasamudram mandal	Madanapalle revenue division	Annamayya district	
Thamballapalle mandal	Madanapalle revenue division	Annamayya district	
Gurramkonda mandal	Pileru revenue division	Annamayya district	
Kalakada mandal	Pileru revenue division	Annamayya district	
Kalikiri mandal	Pileru revenue division	Annamayya district	
Kambhamvaripalle mandal	Pileru revenue division	Annamayya district	
Pileru mandal	Pileru revenue division	Annamayya district	
Sodam mandal	Pileru revenue division	Annamayya district	
Somala mandal	Pileru revenue division	Annamayya district	
Vayalpad mandal	Pileru revenue division	Annamayya district	
Chinnamandyam mandal	Rayachoti revenue division	Annamayya district	
Galiveedu mandal	Rayachoti revenue division	Annamayya district	
Lakkireddipalli mandal	Rayachoti revenue division	Annamayya district	
Ramapuram mandal	Rayachoti revenue division	Annamayya district	
Rayachoti mandal	Rayachoti revenue division	Annamayya district	
Sambepalli mandal	Rayachoti revenue division	Annamayya district	
Bapatla mandal	Bapatla revenue division	Bapatla district	
Karlapalem mandal	Bapatla revenue division	Bapatla district	
Martur mandal	Bapatla revenue division	Bapatla district	
Parchur mandal	Bapatla revenue division	Bapatla district	
Pittalavanipalem mandal	Bapatla revenue division	Bapatla district	
Yeddanapudi mandal	Bapatla revenue division	Bapatla district	
Chinaganjam mandal	Chirala revenue division	Bapatla district	
Chirala mandal	Chirala revenue division	Bapatla district	
Inkollu mandal	Chirala revenue division	Bapatla district	
Karamchedu mandal	Chirala revenue division	Bapatla district	
Vetapalem mandal	Chirala revenue division	Bapatla district	
Amruthalur mandal	Repalle revenue division	Bapatla district	
Bhattiprolu mandal	Repalle revenue division	Bapatla district	
Cherukupalle mandal	Repalle revenue division	Bapatla district	
Kolluru mandal	Repalle revenue division	Bapatla district	
Nagaram mandal	Repalle revenue division	Bapatla district	
Nizampatnam mandal	Repalle revenue division	Bapatla district	
Repalle mandal	Repalle revenue division	Bapatla district	
Tsundur mandal	Repalle revenue division	Bapatla district	
Vemuru mandal	Repalle revenue division	Bapatla district	
Bangarupalem mandal	Chittoor revenue division	Chittoor district	
Chittoor Rural mandal	Chittoor revenue division	Chittoor district	
Chittoor Urban mandal	Chittoor revenue division	Chittoor district	
Gangadhara Nellore mandal	Chittoor revenue division	Chittoor district	
Gudipala mandal	Chittoor revenue division	Chittoor district	
Irala mandal	Chittoor revenue division	Chittoor district	
Penumuru mandal	Chittoor revenue division	Chittoor district	
Pulicherla mandal	Chittoor revenue division	Chittoor district	
Puthalapattu mandal	Chittoor revenue division	Chittoor district	
Rompicherla mandal	Chittoor revenue division	Chittoor district	
Sri Rangaraja Puram mandal	Chittoor revenue division	Chittoor district	
Thavanampalle mandal	Chittoor revenue division	Chittoor district	
Vedurukuppam mandal	Chittoor revenue division	Chittoor district	
Yadamarri mandal	Chittoor revenue division	Chittoor district	
Kuppam mandal	Kuppam revenue division	Chittoor district	
Ramakuppam mandal	Kuppam revenue division	Chittoor district	
Santhipuram mandal	Kuppam revenue division	Chittoor district	
Gudipalle mandal	Kuppam revenue division	Chittoor district	
Nagari mandal	Nagari revenue division	Chittoor district	
Nindra mandal	Nagari revenue division	Chittoor district	
Palasamudram mandal	Nagari revenue division	Chittoor district	
Vijayapuram mandal	Nagari revenue division	Chittoor district	
Karvetinagar mandal	Nagari revenue division	Chittoor district	
Baireddipalle mandal	Palamaner revenue division	Chittoor district	
Gangavaram mandal	Palamaner revenue division	Chittoor district	
Palamaner mandal	Palamaner revenue division	Chittoor district	
Peddapanjani mandal	Palamaner revenue division	Chittoor district	
Venkatagirikota mandal	Palamaner revenue division	Chittoor district	
Allavaram mandal	Amalapuram revenue division	Dr. B. R. Ambedkar Konaseema district	
Amalapuram mandal	Amalapuram revenue division	Dr. B. R. Ambedkar Konaseema district	
I. Polavaram mandal	Amalapuram revenue division	Dr. B. R. Ambedkar Konaseema district	
Katrenikona mandal	Amalapuram revenue division	Dr. B. R. Ambedkar Konaseema district	
Malikipuram mandal	Amalapuram revenue division	Dr. B. R. Ambedkar Konaseema district	
Mamidikuduru mandal	Amalapuram revenue division	Dr. B. R. Ambedkar Konaseema district	
Mummidivaram mandal	Amalapuram revenue division	Dr. B. R. Ambedkar Konaseema district	
Razole mandal	Amalapuram revenue division	Dr. B. R. Ambedkar Konaseema district	
Sakhinetipalle mandal	Amalapuram revenue division	Dr. B. R. Ambedkar Konaseema district	
Uppalaguptam mandal	Amalapuram revenue division	Dr. B. R. Ambedkar Konaseema district	
Ainavilli mandal	Kothapeta revenue division	Dr. B. R. Ambedkar Konaseema district	
Alamuru mandal	Kothapeta revenue division	Dr. B. R. Ambedkar Konaseema district	
Ambajipeta mandal	Kothapeta revenue division	Dr. B. R. Ambedkar Konaseema district	
Atreyapuram mandal	Kothapeta revenue division	Dr. B. R. Ambedkar Konaseema district	
Kothapeta mandal	Kothapeta revenue division	Dr. B. R. Ambedkar Konaseema district	
P. Gannavaram mandal	Kothapeta revenue division	Dr. B. R. Ambedkar Konaseema district	
Ravulapalem mandal	Kothapeta revenue division	Dr. B. R. Ambedkar Konaseema district	
K. Gangavaram mandal	Ramachandrapuram revenue division	Dr. B. R. Ambedkar Konaseema district	
Ramachandrapuram mandal	Ramachandrapuram revenue division	Dr. B. R. Ambedkar Konaseema district	
Chagallu mandal	Kovvur revenue division	East Godavari district	
Devarapalle mandal	Kovvur revenue division	East Godavari district	
Gopalapuram mandal	Kovvur revenue division	East Godavari district	
Kovvur mandal	Kovvur revenue division	East Godavari district	
Nallajerla mandal	Kovvur revenue division	East Godavari district	
Nidadavole mandal	Kovvur revenue division	East Godavari district	
Peravali mandal	Kovvur revenue division	East Godavari district	
Tallapudi mandal	Kovvur revenue division	East Godavari district	
Undrajavaram mandal	Kovvur revenue division	East Godavari district	
Anaparthi mandal	Rajamahendravaram revenue division	East Godavari district	
Biccavolu mandal	Rajamahendravaram revenue division	East Godavari district	
Gokavaram mandal	Rajamahendravaram revenue division	East Godavari district	
Kadiam mandal	Rajamahendravaram revenue division	East Godavari district	
Kapileswarapuram mandal	Rajamahendravaram revenue division	East Godavari district	
Korukonda mandal	Rajamahendravaram revenue division	East Godavari district	
Mandapeta mandal	Rajamahendravaram revenue division	East Godavari district	
Rajamahendravaram Urban mandal	Rajamahendravaram revenue division	East Godavari district	
Rajamahendravaram Rural mandal	Rajamahendravaram revenue division	East Godavari district	
Rajanagaram mandal	Rajamahendravaram revenue division	East Godavari district	
Rangampeta mandal	Rajamahendravaram revenue division	East Godavari district	
Rayavaram mandal	Rajamahendravaram revenue division	East Godavari district	
Seethanagaram mandal	Rajamahendravaram revenue division	East Godavari district	
Bhimadole mandal	Eluru revenue division	Eluru district	
Denduluru mandal	Eluru revenue division	Eluru district	
Eluru Rural mandal	Eluru revenue division	Eluru district	
Eluru Urban mandal	Eluru revenue division	Eluru district	
Kaikalur mandal	Eluru revenue division	Eluru district	
Kalidindi mandal	Eluru revenue division	Eluru district	
Mandavalli mandal	Eluru revenue division	Eluru district	
Mudinepalle mandal	Eluru revenue division	Eluru district	
Nidamarru mandal	Eluru revenue division	Eluru district	
Pedapadu mandal	Eluru revenue division	Eluru district	
Pedavegi mandal	Eluru revenue division	Eluru district	
Unguturu mandal	Eluru revenue division	Eluru district	
Buttayagudem mandal	Jangareddigudem revenue division	Eluru district	
Dwaraka Tirumala mandal	Jangareddigudem revenue division	Eluru district	
Jangareddygudem mandal	Jangareddigudem revenue division	Eluru district	
Jeelugu Milli mandal	Jangareddigudem revenue division	Eluru district	
Kamavarapukota mandal	Jangareddigudem revenue division	Eluru district	
Koyyalagudem mandal	Jangareddigudem revenue division	Eluru district	
Kukunoor mandal	Jangareddigudem revenue division	Eluru district	
Polavaram mandal	Jangareddigudem revenue division	Eluru district	
T. Narasapuram mandal	Jangareddigudem revenue division	Eluru district	
Velairpadu mandal	Jangareddigudem revenue division	Eluru district	
Agiripalli mandal	Nuzvid revenue division	Eluru district	
Chatrai mandal	Nuzvid revenue division	Eluru district	
Chintalapudi mandal	Nuzvid revenue division	Eluru district	
Lingapalem mandal	Nuzvid revenue division	Eluru district	
Musunuru mandal	Nuzvid revenue division	Eluru district	
Nuzvid mandal	Nuzvid revenue division	Eluru district	
Guntur East mandal	Guntur revenue division	Guntur district	
Guntur West mandal	Guntur revenue division	Guntur district	
Medikonduru mandal	Guntur revenue division	Guntur district	
Pedakakani mandal	Guntur revenue division	Guntur district	
Pedanandipadu mandal	Guntur revenue division	Guntur district	
Phirangipuram mandal	Guntur revenue division	Guntur district	
Prathipadu mandal	Guntur revenue division	Guntur district	
Tadikonda mandal	Guntur revenue division	Guntur district	
Thullur mandal	Guntur revenue division	Guntur district	
Vatticherukuru mandal	Guntur revenue division	Guntur district	
Chebrolu mandal	Tenali revenue division	Guntur district	
Duggirala mandal	Tenali revenue division	Guntur district	
Kakumanu mandal	Tenali revenue division	Guntur district	
Kollipara mandal	Tenali revenue division	Guntur district	
Mangalagiri mandal	Tenali revenue division	Guntur district	
Ponnur mandal	Tenali revenue division	Guntur district	
Tadepalli mandal	Tenali revenue division	Guntur district	
Tenali mandal	Tenali revenue division	Guntur district	
Gollaprolu mandal	Kakinada revenue division	Kakinada district	
Kajuluru mandal	Kakinada revenue division	Kakinada district	
Kakinada Rural mandal	Kakinada revenue division	Kakinada district	
Kakinada Urban mandal	Kakinada revenue division	Kakinada district	
Karapa mandal	Kakinada revenue division	Kakinada district	
Kothapalle mandal	Kakinada revenue division	Kakinada district	
Pedapudi mandal	Kakinada revenue division	Kakinada district	
Pithapuram mandal	Kakinada revenue division	Kakinada district	
Thallarevu mandal	Kakinada revenue division	Kakinada district	
Gandepalle mandal	Peddapuram revenue division	Kakinada district	
Jaggampeta mandal	Peddapuram revenue division	Kakinada district	
Kirlampudi mandal	Peddapuram revenue division	Kakinada district	
Kotananduru mandal	Peddapuram revenue division	Kakinada district	
Peddapuram mandal	Peddapuram revenue division	Kakinada district	
Prathipadu mandal	Peddapuram revenue division	Kakinada district	
Rowthulapudi mandal	Peddapuram revenue division	Kakinada district	
Samalkota mandal	Peddapuram revenue division	Kakinada district	
Sankhavaram mandal	Peddapuram revenue division	Kakinada district	
Thondangi mandal	Peddapuram revenue division	Kakinada district	
Tuni mandal	Peddapuram revenue division	Kakinada district	
Yeleswaram mandal	Peddapuram revenue division	Kakinada district	
Bapulapadu mandal	Gudivada revenue division	Krishna district	
Gannavaram mandal	Gudivada revenue division	Krishna district	
Gudivada mandal	Gudivada revenue division	Krishna district	
Gudlavalleru mandal	Gudivada revenue division	Krishna district	
Nandivada mandal	Gudivada revenue division	Krishna district	
Pedaparupudi mandal	Gudivada revenue division	Krishna district	
Unguturu mandal	Gudivada revenue division	Krishna district	
Avanigadda mandal	Machilipatnam revenue division	Krishna district	
Bantumilli mandal	Machilipatnam revenue division	Krishna district	
Challapalli mandal	Machilipatnam revenue division	Krishna district	
Ghantasala mandal	Machilipatnam revenue division	Krishna district	
Guduru mandal	Machilipatnam revenue division	Krishna district	
Koduru mandal	Machilipatnam revenue division	Krishna district	
Kruthivennu mandal	Machilipatnam revenue division	Krishna district	
Machilipatnam North mandal	Machilipatnam revenue division	Krishna district	
Machilipatnam South mandal	Machilipatnam revenue division	Krishna district	
Mopidevi mandal	Machilipatnam revenue division	Krishna district	
Nagayalanka mandal	Machilipatnam revenue division	Krishna district	
Pedana mandal	Machilipatnam revenue division	Krishna district	
Kankipadu mandal	Vuyyuru revenue division	Krishna district	
Movva mandal	Vuyyuru revenue division	Krishna district	
Pamarru mandal	Vuyyuru revenue division	Krishna district	
Pamidimukkala mandal	Vuyyuru revenue division	Krishna district	
Penamaluru mandal	Vuyyuru revenue division	Krishna district	
Thotlavalluru mandal	Vuyyuru revenue division	Krishna district	
Vuyyuru mandal	Vuyyuru revenue division	Krishna district	
Adoni Urban mandal	Adoni revenue division	Kurnool district	
Adoni Rural mandal	Adoni revenue division	Kurnool district	
Gonegandla mandal	Adoni revenue division	Kurnool district	
Holagunda mandal	Adoni revenue division	Kurnool district	
Kosigi mandal	Adoni revenue division	Kurnool district	
Kowthalam mandal	Adoni revenue division	Kurnool district	
Mantralayam mandal	Adoni revenue division	Kurnool district	
Nandavaram mandal	Adoni revenue division	Kurnool district	
Pedda Kadubur mandal	Adoni revenue division	Kurnool district	
Yemmiganur mandal	Adoni revenue division	Kurnool district	
C.Belagal mandal	Kurnool revenue division	Kurnool district	
Gudur mandal	Kurnool revenue division	Kurnool district	
Kallur mandal	Kurnool revenue division	Kurnool district	
Kodumur mandal	Kurnool revenue division	Kurnool district	
Kurnool Urban mandal	Kurnool revenue division	Kurnool district	
Kurnool Rural mandal	Kurnool revenue division	Kurnool district	
Orvakal mandal	Kurnool revenue division	Kurnool district	
Veldurthi mandal	Kurnool revenue division	Kurnool district	
Alur mandal	Pattikonda revenue division	Kurnool district	
Aspari mandal	Pattikonda revenue division	Kurnool district	
Chippagiri mandal	Pattikonda revenue division	Kurnool district	
Devanakonda mandal	Pattikonda revenue division	Kurnool district	
Halaharvi mandal	Pattikonda revenue division	Kurnool district	
Krishnagiri mandal	Pattikonda revenue division	Kurnool district	
Maddikera East mandal	Pattikonda revenue division	Kurnool district	
Pattikonda mandal	Pattikonda revenue division	Kurnool district	
Tuggali mandal	Pattikonda revenue division	Kurnool district	
Chandra Sekhara Puram mandal	Kanigiri revenue division	Markapuram district	
Hanumanthuni Padu mandal	Kanigiri revenue division	Markapuram district	
Kanigiri mandal	Kanigiri revenue division	Markapuram district	
Pamur mandal	Kanigiri revenue division	Markapuram district	
Pedacherlo Palle mandal	Kanigiri revenue division	Markapuram district	
Veligandla mandal	Kanigiri revenue division	Markapuram district	
Ardhaveedu mandal	Markapur revenue division	Markapuram district	
Bestawaripeta mandal	Markapur revenue division	Markapuram district	
Cumbum mandal	Markapur revenue division	Markapuram district	
Dornala mandal	Markapur revenue division	Markapuram district	
Giddalur mandal	Markapur revenue division	Markapuram district	
Konakanamitla mandal	Markapur revenue division	Markapuram district	
Komarolu mandal	Markapur revenue division	Markapuram district	
Markapuram mandal	Markapur revenue division	Markapuram district	
Peda Araveedu mandal	Markapur revenue division	Markapuram district	
Pullalacheruvu mandal	Markapur revenue division	Markapuram district	
Podili mandal	Markapur revenue division	Markapuram district	
Racherla mandal	Markapur revenue division	Markapuram district	
Tarlupadu mandal	Markapur revenue division	Markapuram district	
Tripuranthakam mandal	Markapur revenue division	Markapuram district	
Yerragondapalem mandal	Markapur revenue division	Markapuram district	
Atmakur mandal	Atmakur revenue division (Nandyal)	Nandyal district	
Bandi Atmakur mandal	Atmakur revenue division (Nandyal)	Nandyal district	
Jupadu Bunglow mandal	Atmakur revenue division (Nandyal)	Nandyal district	
Kothapalle mandal	Atmakur revenue division (Nandyal)	Nandyal district	
Midthuru mandal	Atmakur revenue division (Nandyal)	Nandyal district	
Nandikotkur mandal	Atmakur revenue division (Nandyal)	Nandyal district	
Pagidyala mandal	Atmakur revenue division (Nandyal)	Nandyal district	
Pamulapadu mandal	Atmakur revenue division (Nandyal)	Nandyal district	
Srisailam mandal	Atmakur revenue division (Nandyal)	Nandyal district	
Velgodu mandal	Atmakur revenue division (Nandyal)	Nandyal district	
Banaganapalle mandal	Banaganapalle revenue division	Nandyal district	
Koilkuntla mandal	Banaganapalle revenue division	Nandyal district	
Kolimigundla mandal	Banaganapalle revenue division	Nandyal district	
Owk mandal	Banaganapalle revenue division	Nandyal district	
Sanjamala mandal	Banaganapalle revenue division	Nandyal district	
Bethamcherla mandal	Dhone revenue division	Nandyal district	
Dhone mandal	Dhone revenue division	Nandyal district	
Peapally mandal	Dhone revenue division	Nandyal district	
Allagadda mandal	Nandyal revenue division	Nandyal district	
Chagalamarri mandal	Nandyal revenue division	Nandyal district	
Dornipadu mandal	Nandyal revenue division	Nandyal district	
Gadivemula mandal	Nandyal revenue division	Nandyal district	
Gospadu mandal	Nandyal revenue division	Nandyal district	
Mahanandi mandal	Nandyal revenue division	Nandyal district	
Nandyal Rural mandal	Nandyal revenue division	Nandyal district	
Nandyal Urban mandal	Nandyal revenue division	Nandyal district	
Panyam mandal	Nandyal revenue division	Nandyal district	
Rudravaram mandal	Nandyal revenue division	Nandyal district	
Sirivella mandal	Nandyal revenue division	Nandyal district	
Uyyalawada mandal	Nandyal revenue division	Nandyal district	
Chandarlapadu mandal	Nandigama revenue division	NTR district	
Jaggayyapeta mandal	Nandigama revenue division	NTR district	
Kanchikacherla mandal	Nandigama revenue division	NTR district	
Nandigama mandal	Nandigama revenue division	NTR district	
Penuganchiprolu mandal	Nandigama revenue division	NTR district	
Vatsavai mandal	Nandigama revenue division	NTR district	
Veerullapadu mandal	Nandigama revenue division	NTR district	
A. Konduru mandal	Tiruvuru revenue division	NTR district	
Gampalagudem mandal	Tiruvuru revenue division	NTR district	
Reddigudem mandal	Tiruvuru revenue division	NTR district	
Tiruvuru mandal	Tiruvuru revenue division	NTR district	
Vissannapeta mandal	Tiruvuru revenue division	NTR district	
G.Konduru mandal	Vijayawada revenue division	NTR district	
Ibrahimpatnam mandal	Vijayawada revenue division	NTR district	
Mylavaram mandal	Vijayawada revenue division	NTR district	
Vijayawada Rural mandal	Vijayawada revenue division	NTR district	
Vijayawada North mandal	Vijayawada revenue division	NTR district	
Vijayawada Central mandal	Vijayawada revenue division	NTR district	
Vijayawada East mandal	Vijayawada revenue division	NTR district	
Vijayawada West mandal	Vijayawada revenue division	NTR district	
Bollapalle mandal	Gurazala revenue division	Palnadu district	
Dachepalle mandal	Gurazala revenue division	Palnadu district	
Durgi mandal	Gurazala revenue division	Palnadu district	
Gurazala mandal	Gurazala revenue division	Palnadu district	
Karempudi mandal	Gurazala revenue division	Palnadu district	
Macherla mandal	Gurazala revenue division	Palnadu district	
Machavaram mandal	Gurazala revenue division	Palnadu district	
Piduguralla mandal	Gurazala revenue division	Palnadu district	
Rentachintala mandal	Gurazala revenue division	Palnadu district	
Veldurthi mandal		Palnadu district	
Chilakaluripet mandal	Narasaraopet revenue division	Palnadu district	
Edlapadu mandal	Narasaraopet revenue division	Palnadu district	
Ipuru mandal	Narasaraopet revenue division	Palnadu district	
Nadendla mandal	Narasaraopet revenue division	Palnadu district	
Narasaraopet mandal	Narasaraopet revenue division	Palnadu district	
Nuzendla mandal	Narasaraopet revenue division	Palnadu district	
Rompicherla mandal	Narasaraopet revenue division	Palnadu district	
Savalyapuram mandal	Narasaraopet revenue division	Palnadu district	
Vinukonda mandal	Narasaraopet revenue division	Palnadu district	
Amaravathi mandal	Narasaraopet revenue division	Palnadu district	Settenapalli revenue division
Atchampet mandal		Palnadu district	Settenapalli revenue division
Bellamkonda mandal		Palnadu district	Settenapalli revenue division
Krosuru mandal		Palnadu district	Settenapalli revenue division
Muppalla mandal		Palnadu district	Settenapalli revenue division
Nekarikallu mandal		Palnadu district	Settenapalli revenue division
Pedakurapadu mandal		Palnadu district	Settenapalli revenue division
Rajupalem mandal		Palnadu district	Settenapalli revenue division
Sattenapalle mandal		Palnadu district	Settenapalli revenue division
Bhamini mandal	Palakonda revenue division	Parvathipuram Manyam district	
Gummalakshmipuram mandal	Palakonda revenue division	Parvathipuram Manyam district	
Jiyyammavalasa mandal	Palakonda revenue division	Parvathipuram Manyam district	
Kurupam mandal	Palakonda revenue division	Parvathipuram Manyam district	
Palakonda mandal	Palakonda revenue division	Parvathipuram Manyam district	
Seethampeta mandal	Palakonda revenue division	Parvathipuram Manyam district	
Veeraghattam mandal	Palakonda revenue division	Parvathipuram Manyam district	
Balijipeta mandal	Parvathipuram revenue division	Parvathipuram Manyam district	
Garugubilli mandal	Parvathipuram revenue division	Parvathipuram Manyam district	
Komarada mandal	Parvathipuram revenue division	Parvathipuram Manyam district	
Makkuva mandal	Parvathipuram revenue division	Parvathipuram Manyam district	
Pachipenta mandal	Parvathipuram revenue division	Parvathipuram Manyam district	
Parvathipuram mandal	Parvathipuram revenue division	Parvathipuram Manyam district	
Salur mandal	Parvathipuram revenue division	Parvathipuram Manyam district	
Seethanagaram mandal	Parvathipuram revenue division	Parvathipuram Manyam district	
Chintur mandal	Chinturu revenue division	Polavaram district	
Nellipaka mandal	Chinturu revenue division	Polavaram district	
Kunavaram mandal	Chinturu revenue division	Polavaram district	
Vararamachandrapuram mandal	Chinturu revenue division	Polavaram district	
Addateegala mandal	Rampachodavaram revenue division	Polavaram district	
Devipatnam mandal	Rampachodavaram revenue division	Polavaram district	
Gangavaram mandal	Rampachodavaram revenue division	Polavaram district	
Gurthedu mandal	Rampachodavaram revenue division	Polavaram district	
Maredumilli mandal	Rampachodavaram revenue division	Polavaram district	
Rajavommangi mandal	Rampachodavaram revenue division	Polavaram district	
Rampachodavaram mandal	Rampachodavaram revenue division	Polavaram district	
Y. Ramavaram mandal	Rampachodavaram revenue division	Polavaram district	
Korisapadu mandal	Addanki revenue division	Prakasam district	
J. Panguluru mandal	Addanki revenue division	Prakasam district	
Addanki mandal	Addanki revenue division	Prakasam district	
Ballikurava mandal	Addanki revenue division	Prakasam district	
Santhamaguluru mandal	Addanki revenue division	Prakasam district	
Mundlamuru Ongole mandal	Addanki revenue division	Prakasam district	
Thallur mandal	Addanki revenue division	Prakasam district	
Darsi mandal	Addanki revenue division	Prakasam district	
Donakonda Kanigiri mandal	Addanki revenue division	Prakasam district	
Kurichedu mandal	Addanki revenue division	Prakasam district	
Gudluru mandal	Kandukur revenue division	Prakasam district	
Kandukuru mandal	Kandukur revenue division	Prakasam district	
Lingasamudram mandal	Kandukur revenue division	Prakasam district	
Ulavapadu mandal	Kandukur revenue division	Prakasam district	
Marripudi mandal	Kandukur revenue division	Prakasam district	
Ponnaluru mandal	Kandukur revenue division	Prakasam district	
Voletivaripalem mandal	Kandukur revenue division	Prakasam district	
Chimakurthi mandal	Ongole revenue division	Prakasam district	
Kondapi mandal	Ongole revenue division	Prakasam district	
Kotha Patnam mandal	Ongole revenue division	Prakasam district	
Maddipadu mandal	Ongole revenue division	Prakasam district	
Naguluppalapadu mandal	Ongole revenue division	Prakasam district	
Ongole Urban mandal	Ongole revenue division	Prakasam district	
Ongole Rural mandal	Ongole revenue division	Prakasam district	
Santhanuthala Padu mandal	Ongole revenue division	Prakasam district	
Singarayakonda mandal	Ongole revenue division	Prakasam district	
Tangutur mandal	Ongole revenue division	Prakasam district	
Zarugumilli mandal	Ongole revenue division	Prakasam district	
Ananthasagaram mandal	Atmakur revenue division (Nellore)	Sri Potti Sri Ramulu Nellore district	
Anumasamudrampeta mandal	Atmakur revenue division (Nellore)	Sri Potti Sri Ramulu Nellore district	
Atmakur mandal	Atmakur revenue division (Nellore)	Sri Potti Sri Ramulu Nellore district	
Chejerla mandal	Atmakur revenue division (Nellore)	Sri Potti Sri Ramulu Nellore district	
Kaluvoya mandal	Atmakur revenue division (Nellore)	Sri Potti Sri Ramulu Nellore district	
Marripadu mandal	Atmakur revenue division (Nellore)	Sri Potti Sri Ramulu Nellore district	
Sangam mandal	Atmakur revenue division (Nellore)	Sri Potti Sri Ramulu Nellore district	
Sitarampuramu mandal	Atmakur revenue division (Nellore)	Sri Potti Sri Ramulu Nellore district	
Udayagiri mandal	Atmakur revenue division (Nellore)	Sri Potti Sri Ramulu Nellore district	
Gudur mandal	Gudur revenue division	Sri Potti Sri Ramulu Nellore district	
Chillakur mandal	Gudur revenue division	Sri Potti Sri Ramulu Nellore district	
Kota mandal	Gudur revenue division	Sri Potti Sri Ramulu Nellore district	
Allur mandal	Kavali revenue division	Sri Potti Sri Ramulu Nellore district	
Bogolu mandal	Kavali revenue division	Sri Potti Sri Ramulu Nellore district	
Dagadarthi mandal	Kavali revenue division	Sri Potti Sri Ramulu Nellore district	
Duttaluru mandal	Kavali revenue division	Sri Potti Sri Ramulu Nellore district	
Jaladanki mandal	Kavali revenue division	Sri Potti Sri Ramulu Nellore district	
Kaligiri mandal	Kavali revenue division	Sri Potti Sri Ramulu Nellore district	
Kavali mandal	Kavali revenue division	Sri Potti Sri Ramulu Nellore district	
Kodavaluru mandal	Kavali revenue division	Sri Potti Sri Ramulu Nellore district	
Kondapuram mandal	Kavali revenue division	Sri Potti Sri Ramulu Nellore district	
Varikuntapadu mandal	Kavali revenue division	Sri Potti Sri Ramulu Nellore district	
Vidavaluru mandal		Sri Potti Sri Ramulu Nellore district	
Vinjamuru mandal		Sri Potti Sri Ramulu Nellore district	
Buchireddypalem mandal	Nellore revenue division	Sri Potti Sri Ramulu Nellore district	
Indukurpet mandal	Nellore revenue division	Sri Potti Sri Ramulu Nellore district	
Kovur mandal	Nellore revenue division	Sri Potti Sri Ramulu Nellore district	
Manubolu mandal	Nellore revenue division	Sri Potti Sri Ramulu Nellore district	
Muttukuru mandal	Nellore revenue division	Sri Potti Sri Ramulu Nellore district	
Nellore Urban mandal	Nellore revenue division	Sri Potti Sri Ramulu Nellore district	
Nellore Rural mandal	Nellore revenue division	Sri Potti Sri Ramulu Nellore district	
Podalakuru mandal	Nellore revenue division	Sri Potti Sri Ramulu Nellore district	
Rapuru mandal	Nellore revenue division	Sri Potti Sri Ramulu Nellore district	
Saidapuramu mandal	Nellore revenue division	Sri Potti Sri Ramulu Nellore district	
Thotapalligudur mandal	Nellore revenue division		
Venkatachalam mandal	Nellore revenue division		
Bathalapalle mandal	Dharmavaram revenue division	Sri Sathya Sai district	
Chennekothapalle mandal	Dharmavaram revenue division	Sri Sathya Sai district	
Dharmavaram mandal	Dharmavaram revenue division	Sri Sathya Sai district	
Kanaganapalle mandal	Dharmavaram revenue division	Sri Sathya Sai district	
Mudigubba mandal	Dharmavaram revenue division	Sri Sathya Sai district	
Ramagiri mandal	Dharmavaram revenue division	Sri Sathya Sai district	
Tadimarri mandal	Dharmavaram revenue division	Sri Sathya Sai district	
Gandlapenta mandal	Kadiri revenue division	Sri Sathya Sai district	
Kadiri mandal	Kadiri revenue division	Sri Sathya Sai district	
Lepakshi mandal	Kadiri revenue division	Sri Sathya Sai district	
Nallacheruvu mandal	Kadiri revenue division	Sri Sathya Sai district	
Nambulapulakunta mandal	Kadiri revenue division	Sri Sathya Sai district	
Tanakal mandal	Kadiri revenue division	Sri Sathya Sai district	
Agali mandal	Madakasira revenue division	Sri Sathya Sai district	
Amarapuram mandal	Madakasira revenue division	Sri Sathya Sai district	
Gudibanda mandal	Madakasira revenue division	Sri Sathya Sai district	
Madakasira mandal	Madakasira revenue division	Sri Sathya Sai district	
Rolla mandal	Madakasira revenue division	Sri Sathya Sai district	
Chilamathur mandal	Penukonda revenue division	Sri Sathya Sai district	
Gorantla mandal	Penukonda revenue division	Sri Sathya Sai district	
Hindupur mandal	Penukonda revenue division	Sri Sathya Sai district	
Parigi mandal	Penukonda revenue division	Sri Sathya Sai district	
Penukonda mandal	Penukonda revenue division	Sri Sathya Sai district	
Roddam mandal	Penukonda revenue division	Sri Sathya Sai district	
Somandepalle mandal	Penukonda revenue division	Sri Sathya Sai district	
Talupula mandal	Penukonda revenue division	Sri Sathya Sai district	
Amadagur mandal	Puttaparthi revenue division	Sri Sathya Sai district	
Bukkapatnam mandal	Puttaparthi revenue division	Sri Sathya Sai district	
Kothacheruvu mandal	Puttaparthi revenue division	Sri Sathya Sai district	
Nallamada mandal	Puttaparthi revenue division	Sri Sathya Sai district	
Obuladevaracheruvu mandal	Puttaparthi revenue division	Sri Sathya Sai district	
Puttaparthi mandal	Puttaparthi revenue division	Sri Sathya Sai district	
Ichchapuram mandal	Palasa revenue division	Srikakulam district	
Kanchili mandal	Palasa revenue division	Srikakulam district	
Kaviti mandal	Palasa revenue division	Srikakulam district	
Mandasa mandal	Palasa revenue division	Srikakulam district	
Palasa mandal	Palasa revenue division	Srikakulam district	
Sompeta mandal	Palasa revenue division	Srikakulam district	
Vajrapukothuru mandal	Palasa revenue division	Srikakulam district	
Amadalavalasa mandal	Srikakulam revenue division	Srikakulam district	
Burja mandal	Srikakulam revenue division	Srikakulam district	
Etcherla mandal	Srikakulam revenue division	Srikakulam district	
Ganguvarisigadam mandal	Srikakulam revenue division	Srikakulam district	
Gara mandal	Srikakulam revenue division	Srikakulam district	
Jalumuru mandal	Srikakulam revenue division	Srikakulam district	
Laveru mandal	Srikakulam revenue division	Srikakulam district	
Narasannapeta mandal	Srikakulam revenue division	Srikakulam district	
Polaki mandal	Srikakulam revenue division	Srikakulam district	
Ponduru mandal	Srikakulam revenue division	Srikakulam district	
Ranastalam mandal	Srikakulam revenue division	Srikakulam district	
Sarubujjili mandal	Srikakulam revenue division	Srikakulam district	
Srikakulam mandal	Srikakulam revenue division	Srikakulam district	
Hiramandalam mandal	Tekkali revenue division	Srikakulam district	
Kotabommali mandal	Tekkali revenue division	Srikakulam district	
Kothuru mandal	Tekkali revenue division	Srikakulam district	
Lakshminarsupeta mandal	Tekkali revenue division	Srikakulam district	
Meliaputti mandal	Tekkali revenue division	Srikakulam district	
Nandigam mandal	Tekkali revenue division	Srikakulam district	
Pathapatnam mandal	Tekkali revenue division	Srikakulam district	
Santhabommali mandal	Tekkali revenue division	Srikakulam district	
Saravakota mandal	Tekkali revenue division	Srikakulam district	
Tekkali mandal	Tekkali revenue division	Srikakulam district	
Balayapalle mandal	Srikalahasti revenue division	Tirupati district	
Dakkili mandal	Srikalahasti revenue division	Tirupati district	
K. V. B. Puram mandal	Srikalahasti revenue division	Tirupati district	
Nagalapuram mandal	Srikalahasti revenue division	Tirupati district	
Narayanavanam mandal	Srikalahasti revenue division	Tirupati district	
Pichatur mandal	Srikalahasti revenue division	Tirupati district	
Renigunta mandal	Srikalahasti revenue division	Tirupati district	
Srikalahasti mandal	Srikalahasti revenue division	Tirupati district	
Thottambedu mandal	Srikalahasti revenue division	Tirupati district	
Venkatagiri mandal	Srikalahasti revenue division	Tirupati district	
Yerpedu mandal	Srikalahasti revenue division	Tirupati district	
Buchinaidu Kandriga mandal	Sullurpeta revenue division	Tirupati district	
Chittamur mandal	Sullurpeta revenue division	Tirupati district	
Doravarisatram mandal	Sullurpeta revenue division	Tirupati district	
Naidupeta mandal	Sullurpeta revenue division	Tirupati district	
Ozili mandal	Sullurpeta revenue division	Tirupati district	
Pellakur mandal	Sullurpeta revenue division	Tirupati district	
Satyavedu mandal	Sullurpeta revenue division	Tirupati district	
Sullurpeta mandal	Sullurpeta revenue division	Tirupati district	
Tada mandal	Sullurpeta revenue division	Tirupati district	
Vakadu mandal	Sullurpeta revenue division	Tirupati district	
Varadaiahpalem mandal	Sullurpeta revenue division	Tirupati district	
Chandragiri mandal	Tirupati revenue division	Tirupati district	
Chinnagottigallu mandal	Tirupati revenue division	Tirupati district	
Chitvel mandal	Tirupati revenue division	Tirupati district	
Kodur mandal	Tirupati revenue division	Tirupati district	
Obulavaripalle mandal	Tirupati revenue division	Tirupati district	
Pakala mandal	Tirupati revenue division	Tirupati district	
Penagalur mandal	Tirupati revenue division	Tirupati district	
Pullampeta mandal	Tirupati revenue division	Tirupati district	
Puttur mandal	Tirupati revenue division	Tirupati district	
Ramachandrapuram mandal	Tirupati revenue division	Tirupati district	
Tirupati Rural mandal	Tirupati revenue division	Tirupati district	
Tirupati Urban mandal	Tirupati revenue division	Tirupati district	
Vadamalapeta mandal	Tirupati revenue division	Tirupati district	
Yerravaripalem mandal	Tirupati revenue division	Tirupati district	
Anandapuram mandal	Bheemunipatnam revenue division	Visakhapatnam district	
Bheemunipatnam mandal	Bheemunipatnam revenue division	Visakhapatnam district	
Padmanabham mandal	Bheemunipatnam revenue division	Visakhapatnam district	
Seethammadhara mandal	Bheemunipatnam revenue division	Visakhapatnam district	
Visakhapatnam Rural mandal	Bheemunipatnam revenue division	Visakhapatnam district	
Gajuwaka mandal	Visakhapatnam revenue division	Visakhapatnam district	
Gopalapatnam mandal	Visakhapatnam revenue division	Visakhapatnam district	
Maharanipeta mandal	Visakhapatnam revenue division	Visakhapatnam district	
Mulagada mandal	Visakhapatnam revenue division	Visakhapatnam district	
Pedagantyada mandal	Visakhapatnam revenue division	Visakhapatnam district	
Pendurthi mandal	Visakhapatnam revenue division	Visakhapatnam district	
Badangi mandal	Bobbili revenue division	Vizianagaram district	
Bobbili mandal	Bobbili revenue division	Vizianagaram district	
Dattirajeru mandal	Bobbili revenue division	Vizianagaram district	
Gajapathinagaram mandal	Bobbili revenue division	Vizianagaram district	
Mentada mandal	Bobbili revenue division	Vizianagaram district	
Ramabhadrapuram mandal	Bobbili revenue division	Vizianagaram district	
Therlam mandal	Bobbili revenue division	Vizianagaram district	
Cheepurupalle mandal	Cheepurupalle revenue division	Vizianagaram district	
Garividi mandal	Cheepurupalle revenue division	Vizianagaram district	
Gurla mandal	Cheepurupalle revenue division	Vizianagaram district	
Merakamudidam mandal	Cheepurupalle revenue division	Vizianagaram district	
Rajam mandal	Cheepurupalle revenue division	Vizianagaram district	
Regidi Amadalavalasa mandal	Cheepurupalle revenue division	Vizianagaram district	
Santhakaviti mandal	Cheepurupalle revenue division	Vizianagaram district	
Vangara mandal	Cheepurupalle revenue division	Vizianagaram district	
Bhogapuram mandal	Vizianagaram revenue division	Vizianagaram district	
Bondapalle mandal	Vizianagaram revenue division	Vizianagaram district	
Denkada mandal	Vizianagaram revenue division	Vizianagaram district	
Gantyada mandal	Vizianagaram revenue division	Vizianagaram district	
Jami mandal	Vizianagaram revenue division	Vizianagaram district	
Kothavalasa mandal	Vizianagaram revenue division	Vizianagaram district	
Lakkavarapukota mandal	Vizianagaram revenue division	Vizianagaram district	
Nellimarla mandal	Vizianagaram revenue division	Vizianagaram district	
Pusapatirega mandal	Vizianagaram revenue division	Vizianagaram district	
Srungavarapukota mandal	Vizianagaram revenue division	Vizianagaram district	
Vepada mandal	Vizianagaram revenue division	Vizianagaram district	
Vizianagaram Rural mandal	Vizianagaram revenue division	Vizianagaram district	
Vizianagaram Urban mandal	Vizianagaram revenue division	Vizianagaram district	
Akividu mandal	Bhimavaram revenue division	West Godavari district	
Bhimavaram mandal	Bhimavaram revenue division	West Godavari district	
Ganapavaram mandal	Bhimavaram revenue division	West Godavari district	
Kalla mandal	Bhimavaram revenue division	West Godavari district	
Palacoderu mandal	Bhimavaram revenue division	West Godavari district	
Undi mandal	Bhimavaram revenue division	West Godavari district	
Veeravasaram mandal	Bhimavaram revenue division	West Godavari district	
Achanta mandal	Narasapuram revenue division	West Godavari district	
Mogalthur mandal	Narasapuram revenue division	West Godavari district	
Narasapuram mandal	Narasapuram revenue division	West Godavari district	
Palakollu mandal	Narasapuram revenue division	West Godavari district	
Penugonda mandal	Narasapuram revenue division	West Godavari district	
Penumantra mandal	Narasapuram revenue division	West Godavari district	
Poduru mandal	Narasapuram revenue division	West Godavari district	
Yelamanchili mandal	Narasapuram revenue division	West Godavari district	
Attili mandal	Tadepalligudem revenue division	West Godavari district	
Iragavaram mandal	Tadepalligudem revenue division	West Godavari district	
Pentapadu mandal	Tadepalligudem revenue division	West Godavari district	
Tadepalligudem mandal	Tadepalligudem revenue division	West Godavari district	
Tanuku mandal	Tadepalligudem revenue division	West Godavari district	
Atloor mandal	Badvel revenue division	YSR Kadapa district	
B. Kodur mandal	Badvel revenue division	YSR Kadapa district	
Badvel mandal	Badvel revenue division	YSR Kadapa district	
Brahmamgarimattam mandal	Badvel revenue division	YSR Kadapa district	
Gopavaram mandal	Badvel revenue division	YSR Kadapa district	
Kalasapadu mandal	Badvel revenue division	YSR Kadapa district	
Porumamilla mandal	Badvel revenue division	YSR Kadapa district	
S.Mydukur mandal	Badvel revenue division	YSR Kadapa district	
Sri Avadhutha Kasinayana mandal	Badvel revenue division	YSR Kadapa district	
Chapad mandal	Jammalamadugu revenue division	YSR Kadapa district	
Duvvur mandal	Jammalamadugu revenue division	YSR Kadapa district	
Proddatur mandal	Jammalamadugu revenue division	YSR Kadapa district	
Rajupalem mandal	Jammalamadugu revenue division	YSR Kadapa district	
Yerraguntla mandal	Jammalamadugu revenue division	YSR Kadapa district	
Jammalamadugu mandal	Jammalamadugu revenue division	YSR Kadapa district	
Muddanur mandal	Jammalamadugu revenue division	YSR Kadapa district	
Mylavaram mandal	Jammalamadugu revenue division	YSR Kadapa district	
Peddamudium mandal	Jammalamadugu revenue division	YSR Kadapa district	
Kondapuram mandal	Jammalamadugu revenue division	YSR Kadapa district	
Chennur mandal	Kadapa revenue division	YSR Kadapa district	
Chinthakommadinne mandal	Kadapa revenue division	YSR Kadapa district	
Khajipet mandal	Kadapa revenue division	YSR Kadapa district	
Pendlimarri mandal	Kadapa revenue division	YSR Kadapa district	
Kadapa mandal	Kadapa revenue division	YSR Kadapa district	
Kamalapuram mandal	Kadapa revenue division	YSR Kadapa district	
Sidhout mandal	Kadapa revenue division	YSR Kadapa district	
Vallur mandal	Kadapa revenue division	YSR Kadapa district	
Vontimitta mandal	Kadapa revenue division	YSR Kadapa district	
Simhadripuram mandal	Pulivendula revenue division	YSR Kadapa district	
Lingala mandal	Pulivendula revenue division	YSR Kadapa district	
Pulivendla mandal	Pulivendula revenue division	YSR Kadapa district	
Thondur mandal	Pulivendula revenue division	YSR Kadapa district	
Veerapunayunipalle mandal	Pulivendula revenue division	YSR Kadapa district	
Vempalle mandal	Pulivendula revenue division	YSR Kadapa district	
Vemula mandal	Pulivendula revenue division	YSR Kadapa district	
Chakrayapet mandal	Pulivendula revenue division	YSR Kadapa district	
Rajampet mandal	Rajampeta revenue division	YSR Kadapa district	
Nandalur mandal	Rajampeta revenue division	YSR Kadapa district	
Veeraballi mandal	Rajampeta revenue division	YSR Kadapa district	
T. Sundupalle mandal	Rajampeta revenue division	YSR Kadapa district	
