= Bheemunipatnam revenue division =

Revenue division in Visakhapatnam district, Andhra Pradesh, India

- revenue division in Visakhapatnam district
- Country: India
- State: Andhra Pradesh
- District: Visakhapatnam
- Formed: 4 April 2022
- Founder: Government of Andhra Pradesh
- Headquarters: Bheemunipatnam
- Time zone: UTC+05:30 (IST)

Bheemunipatnam revenue division is an administrative division in the Visakhapatnam district of the Indian state of Andhra Pradesh. It is one of the two revenue divisions in the district and comprises five mandals. The division was newly formed Visakhapatnam district on 4 April 2022.

The revenue division comprises five mandals: Bheemunipatnam mandal,Anandapuram mandal, Padmanabham mandal, Visakhapatnam Rural mandal, and Seethammadhara mandal.

== See also ==
- List of revenue divisions in Andhra Pradesh
- List of mandals in Andhra Pradesh
