= Pothinamallayya Palem =

- Neighbourhood
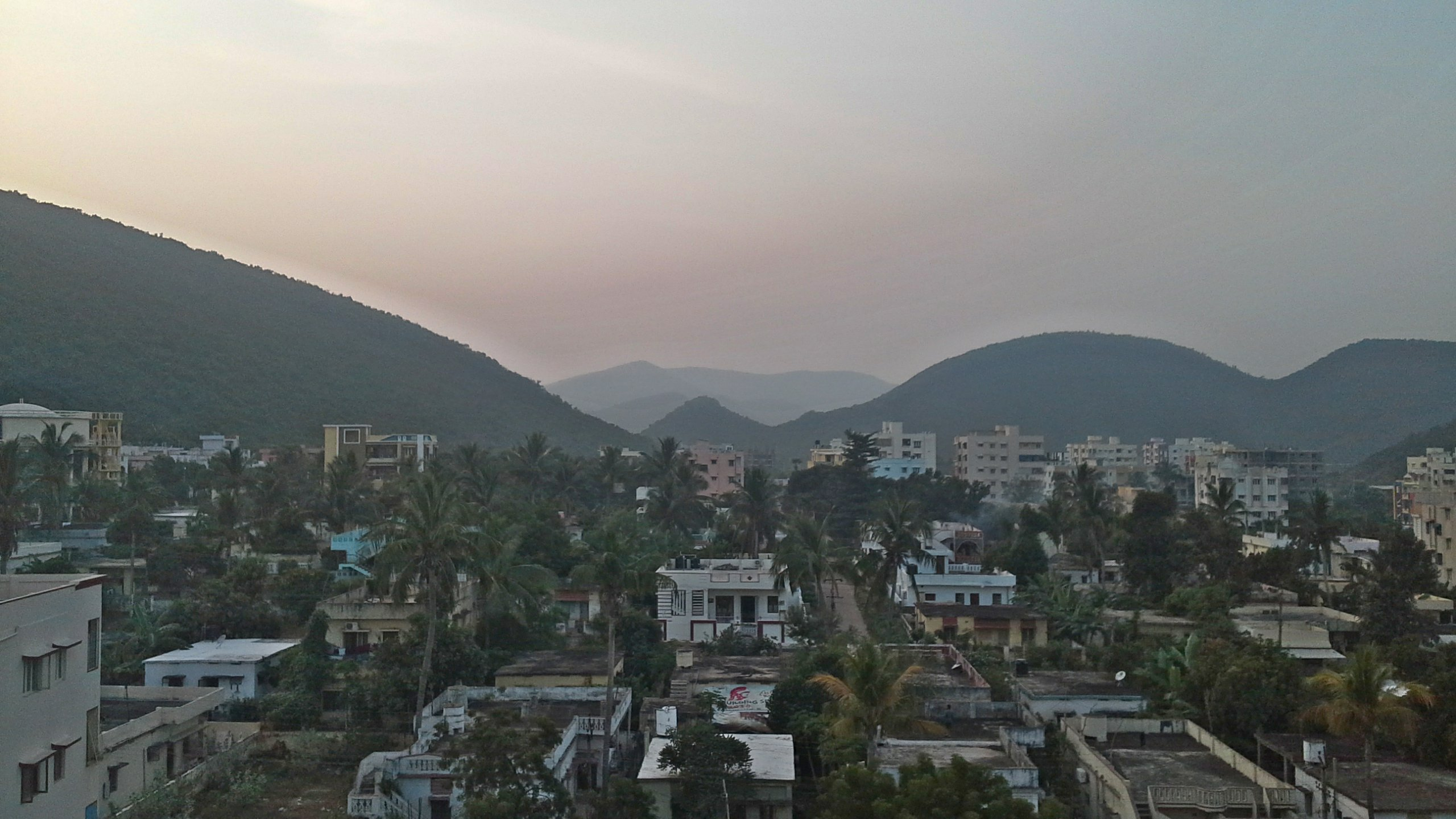
- Areal view of PM Palem
- Nicknames: PM Palem, PMP
- Location in Visakhapatnam
- Coordinates: 17°48′06″N 83°21′12″E
- Country: India
- State: Andhra Pradesh
- District: Visakhapatnam

Government
  - Body: Greater Visakhapatnam Municipal Corporation

Languages
  - Official: Telugu
- Time zone: UTC+5:30 (IST)
- PIN: 530041
- Vehicle registration: AP 31 and AP 32

Pothinamallayya Palem or PM Palem, is a residential neighbourhood situated in Visakhapatnam city in the Indian state of Andhra Pradesh. It is located in the Greater Visakhapatnam Municipal Corporation area. It is located to the north of Visakhapatnam city on National Highway 16 (NH16) to Srikakulam. This place is well connected to other parts of the city such as Asilmetta and Maddilapalem. The only international cricket stadium in Andhra Pradesh (Dr. Y.S. Rajasekhara Reddy ACA-VDCA Cricket Stadium) is located here.

== Nearby Localities ==
Yendada ( 4 km ), Rushikonda ( 7 km ), Kommadi ( 7 km ), Sagar Nagar ( 6 km ) are the nearby Localities to Pothinamallayya Palem.

== Transport ==
PM Palem is well connected to Gurudwara Junction (City Bus Stop), Visakhapatnam APSRTC Bus Station, NAD X Road, Maddilapalem and APSRTC runs a number of buses from major cities to here.

APSRTC routes

| Route number | Start | End | Via |
|---|---|---|---|
| 25P | PM Palem | Old Head Post Office | Carshed, Ratnagiri HB Colony, Yendada, Hanumanthuwaka, Maddilapalem, RTC Complex, Jagadamba Centre, Town Kotharoad |
| 25R | PM Palem | Railway Station | Carshed, Ratnagiri HB Colony, Yendada, Hanumanthuwaka, Maddilapalem, RTC Complex |
| 25D | Midhilapuri Colony | Old Head Post Office | Carshed, Ratnagiri HB Colony, Yendada, Hanumanthuwaka, Maddilapalem, RTC Complex, Jagadamba Centre, Town Kotharoad |
| 25D/V | Vambay Colony | Old Head Post Office | Midhilapuri Colony, Carshed, Ratnagiri HB Colony, Yendada, Hanumanthuwaka, Maddilapalem, RTC Complex, Jagadamba Centre, Town Kotharoad |
| 404 | PM Palem | Steel Plant Main Gate | Carshed, Ratnagiri HB Colony, Yendada, Hanumanthuwaka, Maddilapalem, RTC Complex, Railway Station, Scindia, Malkapuram, Gajuwaka, Kurmannapalem |

== Commerce ==
This area is a chosen location for real estate investors.
