= Pedavalasa =

- village
- Interactive map of Pedavalasa
- Location in Andhra Pradesh, India Pedavalasa (India)
- Coordinates: 17.8667°N 82.3500°E
- Country: India
- State: Andhra Pradesh
- District: Alluri Sitharama Raju district
- Elevation: 839 m (2,753 ft)

Languages
  - Official: Telugu
- Time zone: UTC+5:30 (IST)
- PIN: 531 133

Pedavalasa is a village and a Mandal in Visakhapatnam district in the state of Andhra Pradesh in India.

== Geography ==
Pedavalasa is located at 17.8667N 82.3500E. It has an average elevation of 839 meters (2755 feet).

== Legislative assembly ==
Pedavalasa is an assembly constituency in Andhra Pradesh.

List of Elected Members:

- 1967 - D.K.Rao.
