= Vinjanampadu =

Vinjanampadu may refer to:

- Vinjanampadu, Guntur, a village in Guntur District, Andhra Pradesh, India
- Vinjanampadu, Prakasam, a village in Prakasam District, Andhra Pradesh, India
