= Yeddanapudi =

- Village
- Interactive map of Yeddanapudi
- Location in Andhra Pradesh, India Yeddanapudi (India)
- Coordinates: 15.996779°N 80.172°E
- Country: India
- State: Andhra Pradesh
- District: Bapatla
- Mandal: Yeddanapudi

Population (2011)
  - Total: 3,714

Languages
  - Official: Telugu
- Time zone: UTC+5:30 (IST)
- Telephone code: 08404
- Vehicle registration: AP

Yeddanapudi is a village in Bapatla district of the Indian state of Andhra Pradesh. It is the mandal headquarters of Yeddanapudi mandal .
