= Vinjanampadu, Bapatla district =

Vinjanampadu
- Village
- Interactive map of Vinjanampadu
- Location in Andhra Pradesh, India
- Coordinates: 16°01′54″N 80°11′34″E
- Country: India
- State: Andhra Pradesh
- District: Bapatla
- Mandal: Yeddanapudi
- Time zone: UTC+05:30 (IST)
- Pincode: 523301

Vinjanampadu is a village in Yeddanapudi mandal,Bapatla district of Andhra Pradesh, India.
