= Rajula Tallavalasa =

Rajula Tallavalasa Tallavalasa
- village
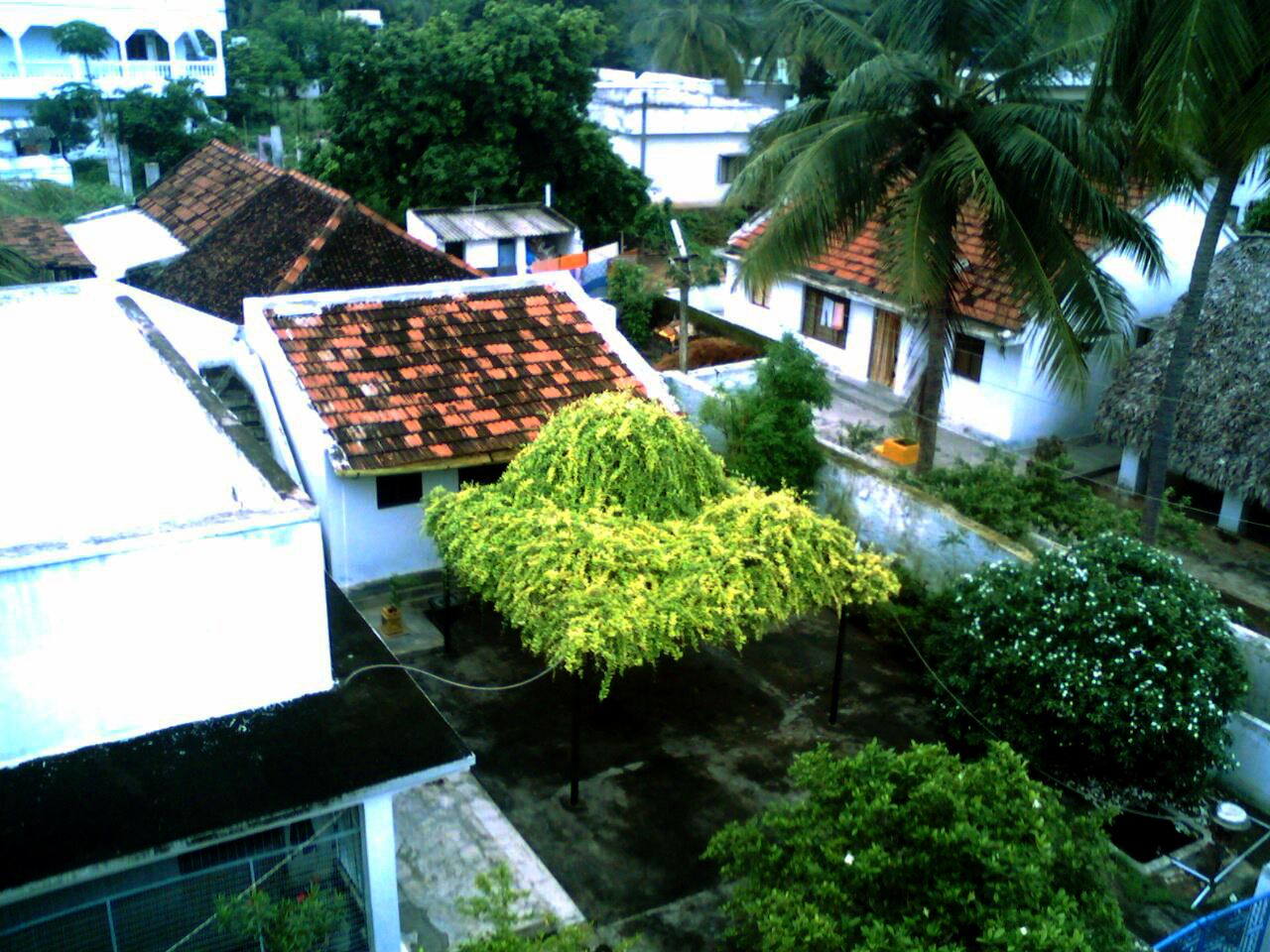
- Rajula Tallavalasa village

- Location in Andhra Pradesh, India Rajula Tallavalasa (India)
- Coordinates: 17°54′39″N 83°24′36″E
- Country: India
- State: Andhra Pradesh
- District: Visakhapatnam

Languages
  - Official: Telugu
- Time zone: UTC+5:30 (IST)
- Nearest city: Visakhapatnam

Rajula Tallavalasa is a village on the Kolkata–Chennai National Highway in Visakhapatnam District. It is a village Panchayat under Bhimili mandal Revenue Division. It is 5 kilometres away from bheemunipatnam beach. This is an educated village. This village has 2 government schools. It is 27 kilometres far from Visakhapatnam city but it has frequent government bus transport as well as private transport available for journey to visakhapatnam city. The pin code of Rajula Tallavalasa is 531162.
