= Maharanipeta mandal =

- Mandal
- Interactive map of Maharanipeta mandal
- Location in Andhra Pradesh, India
- Coordinates: 17.709920°N 83.303109°E
- Country: India
- State: Andhra Pradesh
- District: Visakhapatnam
- Headquarters: Maharanipeta

Languages
  - Official: Telugu
- Time zone: UTC+5:30 (IST)

Maharanipeta mandal is one of the 6 mandals in Visakhapatnam district of Andhra Pradesh in India. It is administered under Visakhapatnam revenue division and its headquarters is located at Maharanipeta. The mandal lies on the coast of Bay of Bengal and is bounded by Visakhapatnam Rural to the north and Visakhapatnam Urban-1 to the west.

Maharanipeta is the only village included in this mandal. However, it is located within the jurisdiction of Greater Visakhapatnam Municipal Corporation, which is responsible for the civic amenities of Maharanipeta.
