= Anandapuram mandal =

- Mandal
- Interactive map of Anandapuram mandal
- Location in Andhra Pradesh, India
- Coordinates: 17°53′53″N 83°23′07.34″E
- Country: India
- State: Andhra Pradesh
- Region: Visakhapatnam
- Headquarters: Anandapuram

Area 205.32
  - Total: 177.08 km^{2} (68.37 sq mi)

Population (2011)
  - Total: 60,789
  - Density: 343.29/km^{2} (889.11/sq mi)

Languages
  - Official: Telugu
- Time zone: UTC+5:30 (IST)
- PIN: 531162, 531163
- Vehicle registration: AP 31

Anandapuram mandal is one of the 46 mandals in Visakhapatnam district of the Indian state of Andhra Pradesh. It is under the administration of Bhemunipatnam revenue division and the headquarters are located at Anandapuram. Anandapuram mandal is bounded by Bheemunipatnam mandal to the east, Chinagadila to the south, Padmanabham to the north and Kothavalasa to the west.

== Demographics ==
Anandapuram mandal covers an area of 205.32 sq. km. The total population is 60,789 residing in 15,265 houses, spread across a total of 32 villages. The population of males is 30,739 and females 30,050. The absence of a town means that there is no urban population in the mandal, whereas the rural population is 60,789. The mandal has a rural population in Visakhapatnam district. The population in the age-group 0–6 is 6,846, of which 3,535 are male and 3,311 are female. The literacy rate is 48.52%, with 29,497 literate, which is significantly lower than the state average of 67.41.

== Towns and villages ==
As of 2011 census, Anandapuram is the most populated and Bakurupalem is the least populated settlement in the mandal. The mandal consists of 32 settlements. Anakapalle municipality was merged with Greater Visakhapatnam Municipal Corporation.

The settlements in the mandal are listed below:

- Anandapuram†
- Bakurupalem
- Bheemannadorapalem
- Boni
- Chandaka
- Dabbanda
- Gambheeram
- Gandigundam
- Gangasani
- Gidijala
- Gorinta
- Gottipalle
- Gudilova
- Jagannadhapuram
- Kanamam
- Kolavanipalem
- Kusuluvada
- Mamidilova
- Mukundapuram
- Mutcherla
- Narayana
- Palavalasa
- Pandalapaka
- Peddipalem
- Pekeru
- Ramavaram
- Sirlapalem
- Sontyam
- Tangudubilli
- Tarluvada
- Vellanki
- Vemulavalasa

Note: †–Mandal headquarter

== Transport ==
The Anakapalle—Anandapuram highway road is an arterial road of the mandal. APSRTC runs city bus services from Anandapuram bus station to major destinations in the Visakhapatnam district.

== See also ==
- List of mandals in Andhra Pradesh
