= Visakhapatnam Rural mandal =

Visakhapatnam Rural
- Mandal
- Interactive Map Outlining mandal
- Location in Andhra Pradesh, India
- Coordinates: 17.762251°N 83.338352°E
- Country: India
- State: Andhra Pradesh
- District: Visakhapatnam
- Headquarters: Visakhapatnam

Area
  - Total: 126.69 km^{2} (48.92 sq mi)

Languages
  - Official: Telugu
- Time zone: UTC+5:30 (IST)

Visakhapatnam Rural Mandal is one of the 46 mandals in Visakhapatnam district of Andhra Pradesh, India. The mandal lies on the coast of Bay of Bengal and is bounded by Bheemunipatnam, Anandapuram mandals to the north and Visakhapatnam Urban-1 to the south.

== Demographics ==
As of 2011 census, the mandal had a population of 260,192. The total population constitute, 131,477 males and 128,715 females —a sex ratio of 979 females per 1000 males. 26,608 children are in the age group of 0–6 years, of which 13,486 are boys and 13,122 are girls —a ratio of 973 per 1000. The average literacy rate stands at 79.07% with 184,699 literates. Gopalapatnam (rural) is the most populated village and Bakkannapalem is the least populated village in the mandal.

== Villages ==
Visakhapatnam Rural mandal consists of the following areas

1. Adivivaram
2. Bakkannapalem
3. Kommadi
4. Madhurawada
5. Simhachalam
6. Paradesipalem
7. Pothinamallayyapalem
8. Rushikonda
9. Yendada

== See also ==
- Visakhapatnam district
