= Gopalapatnam mandal =

- Mandal
- Interactive map of Gopalapatnam mandal
- Location in Andhra Pradesh, India
- Coordinates: 17.748066°N 83.218745°E
- Country: India
- State: Andhra Pradesh
- District: Visakhapatnam
- Headquarters: Gopalapatnam

Languages
  - Official: Telugu
- Time zone: UTC+5:30 (IST)

Gopalapatnam mandal is one of the 11 mandals in Visakhapatnam district of Andhra Pradesh in India. It is administered under Visakhapatnam revenue division and its headquarters is located at Gopalapatnam. The mandal lies on the west fringe of Visakhapatnam city and is bounded by Visakhapatnam Rural to the north and Gajuwaka to the south.

There are no villages in this mandal as it is located within the jurisdiction of Greater Visakhapatnam Municipal Corporation, which is responsible for the civic amenities of Gopalapatnam.
