= Kothapalle mandal =

Kothapalle Mandal
- Mandal
- Interactive map of Kothapalle Mandal
- Coordinates: 17.08°N 82.31°E
- Country: India
- State: Andhra Pradesh
- District: East Godavari

Area
  - Total: 115.46 km^{2} (44.58 sq mi)
- Time zone: UTC+5:30 (IST)

Kothapalle Mandal is one of the 64 mandals in East Godavari District of Andhra Pradesh. As per census 2011, there are 16 villages.

== Demographics ==
Kothapalle Mandal has total population of 82,788 as per the Census 2011. Out of which 41,466 are males while 41,322 are females and the average Sex Ratio of Kothapalle Mandal is 997. The total literacy rate of Kothapalle Mandal is 59.88%. The male literacy rate is 56.19% and the female literacy rate is 50.99%.

== Towns & Villages ==
=== Villages ===
1. Amaravalli
2. Aminabada
3. Gorsa
4. Komaragiri
5. Kondevaram
6. Kothapalle
7. Kutukudumilli
8. Mulapeta
9. Nagulapalle
10. P. Isukapalle
11. Ponnada
12. K. Isukapalle
13. Ramanakkapeta
14. Subbampeta
15. Uppada
16. Vakatippa
17. Yendapalle

== See also ==
- List of mandals in Andhra Pradesh
