= Yendada =

- Neighbourhood
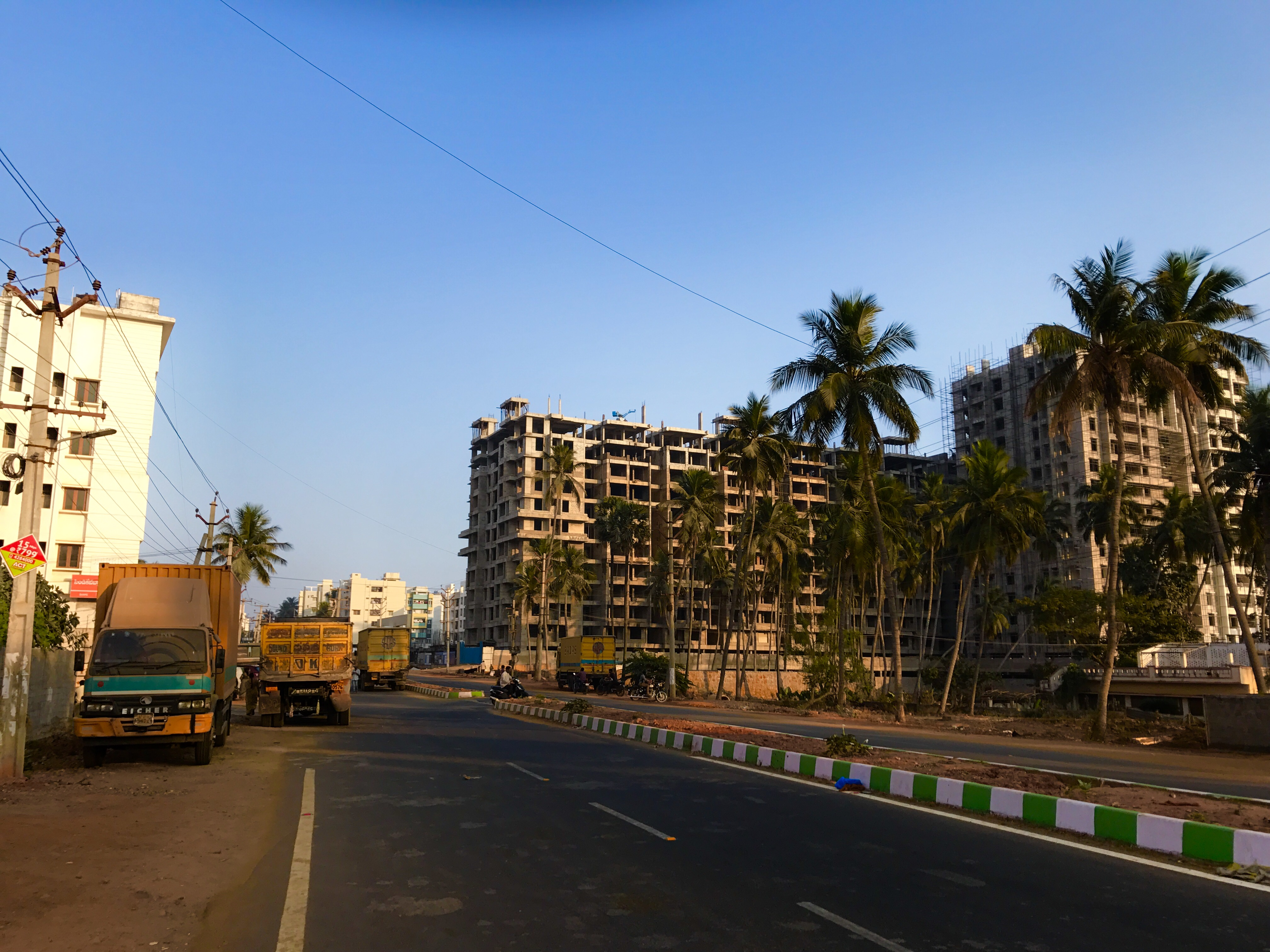
- Apartments at Yendada road

- Location in Visakhapatnam
- Coordinates: 17.777185°N 83.362785°E
- Country: India
- State: Andhra Pradesh
- District: Visakhapatnam

Languages
  - Official: Telugu
- Time zone: UTC+5:30 (IST)
- PIN: 530045
- Vehicle registration: AP-39

Yendada is a neighbourhood situated on Visakhapatnam and Madhurawada road.

== About ==
Yendada is developing very rapidly and undergoing a real estate boom.

== Transport ==
APSRTC routes

Route Number	Start	End	Via
52V/G	Gollala Yendada	Old Head Post Office	Sagar nagar, visalakshi nagar, Hanumanthuwaka, venkoji palem, Maddila palem, RTC Complex (CBS), Jagadamba Centre, Town Kotha Road

== Gallery ==
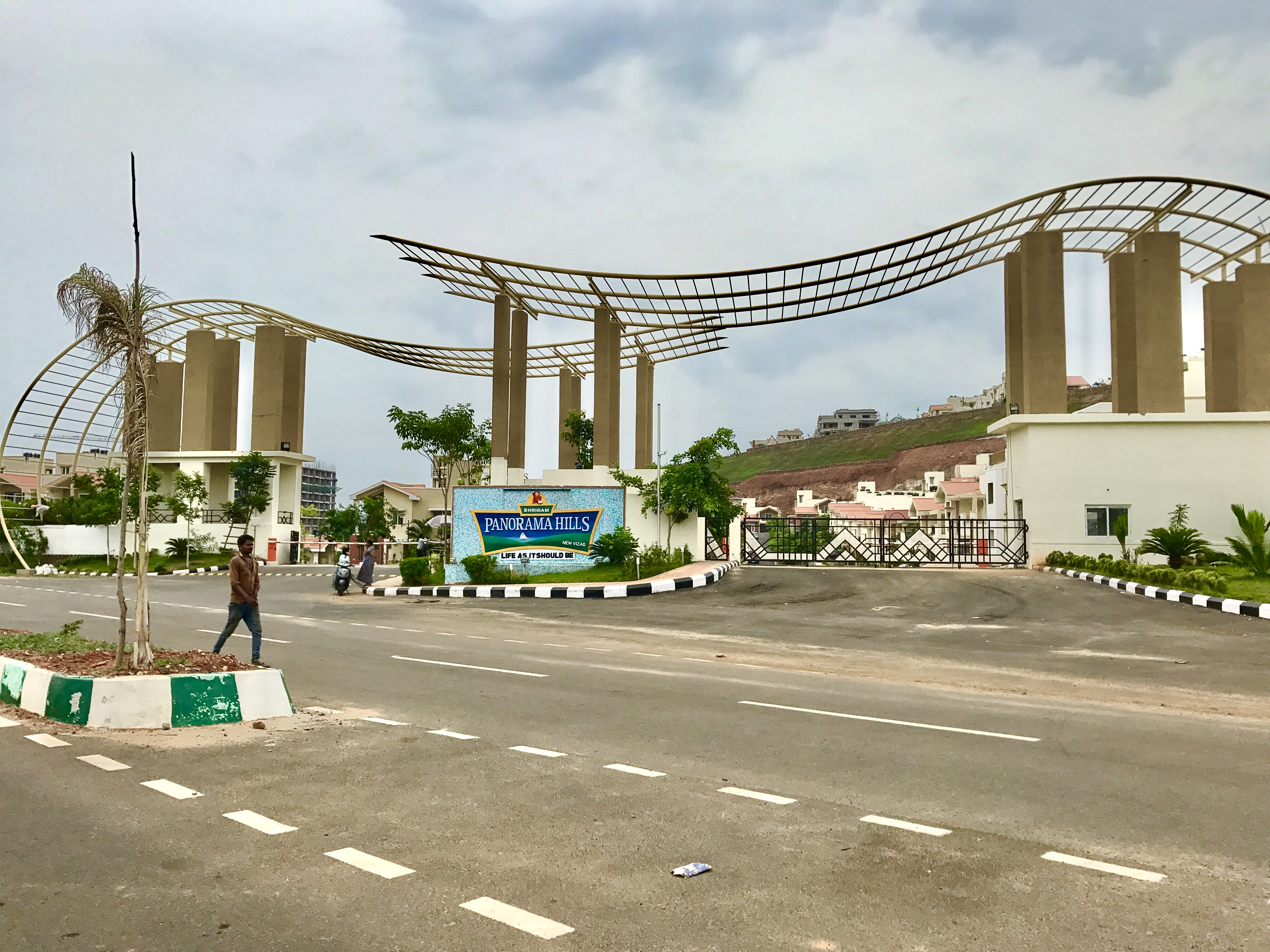
Entrance of Panorama hills near Yendada

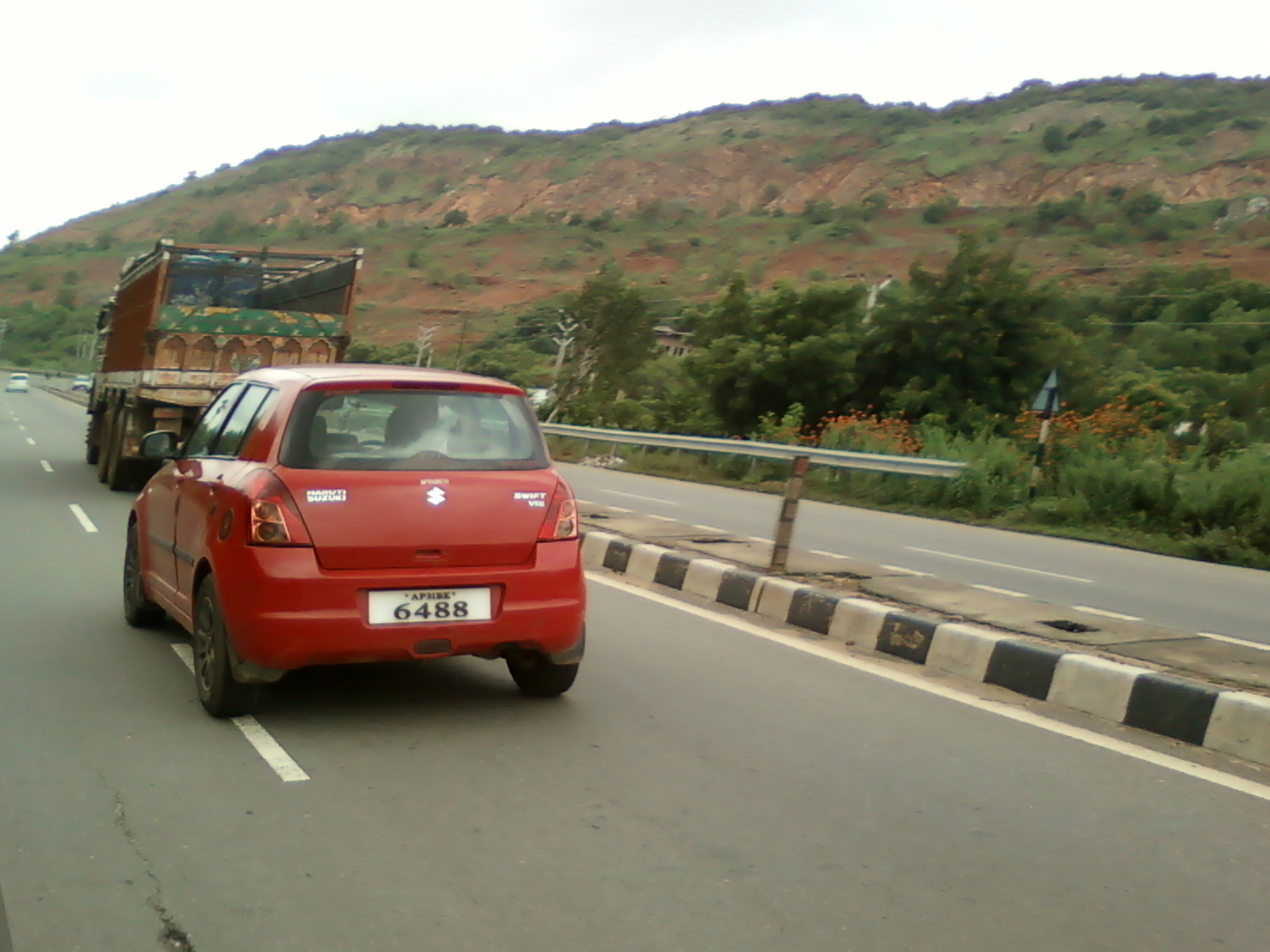
NH5 at Yendada

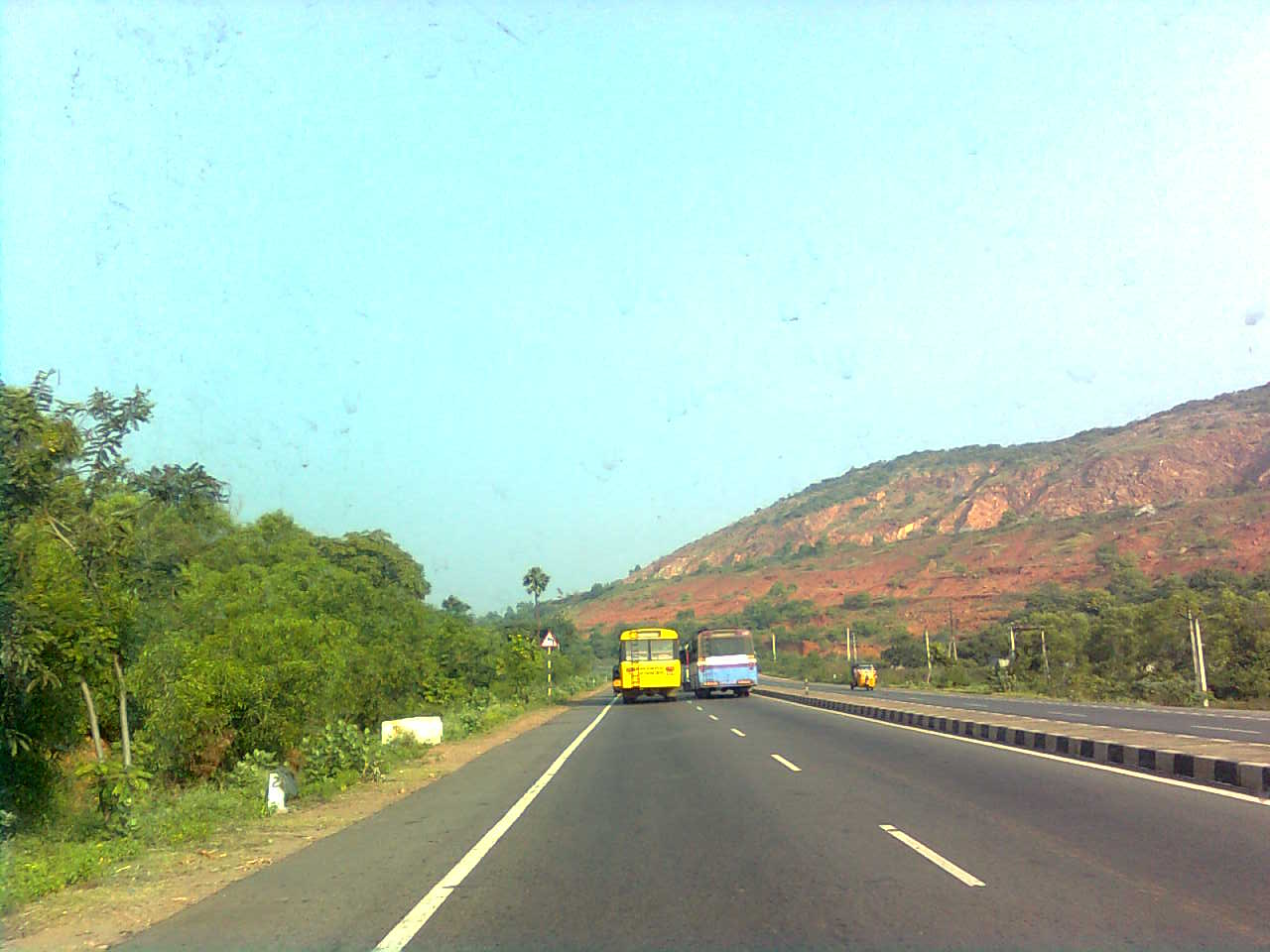
NH5 at Yendada in Visakhapatnam
