= Sri Rangaraja Puram mandal =

Mandal in Chittoor district, Andhra Pradesh, India

- Mandal
- Interactive map of Sri Rangaraja Puram mandal
- Location within Andhra Pradesh Location within India
- Country: India
- State: Andhra Pradesh
- District: Chittoor
- Revenue division: Nagari
- Time zone: UTC+05:30 (IST)

Sri Rangaraja Puram mandal is one of the 31 mandals in Chittoor district in the Indian state of Andhra Pradesh. It is a part of Nagari revenue division.
