= Kommadi =

Kommadi కొమ్మాది
- Neighbourhood
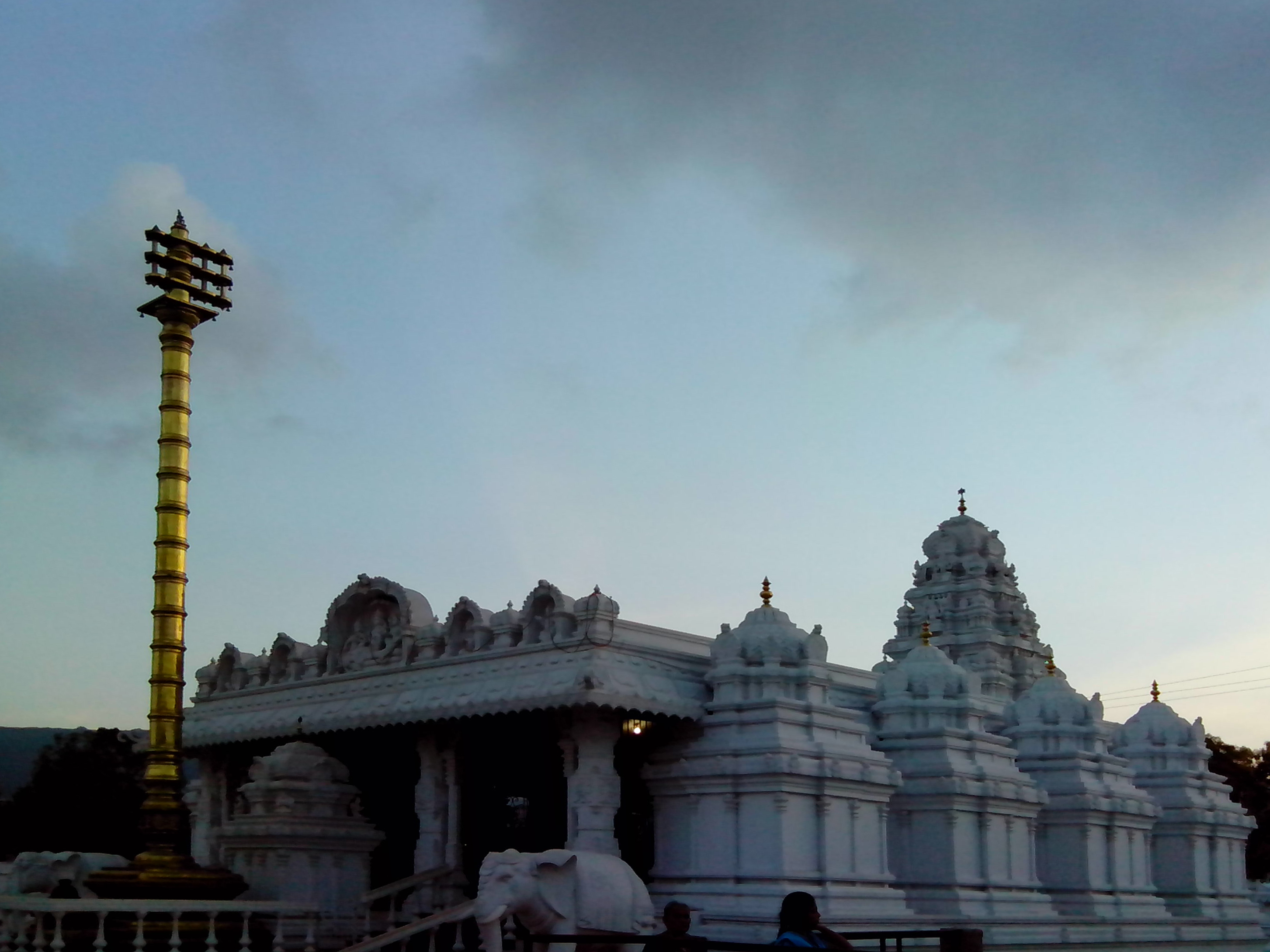
- Ashta Lakshmi Temple at Kommadi

- Location in Visakhapatnam
- Coordinates: 17.842754°N 83.321454°E
- Country: India
- State: Andhra Pradesh
- District: Visakhapatnam

Government
  - Body: Greater Visakhapatnam Municipal Corporation

Languages
  - Official: Telugu
- Time zone: UTC+5:30 (IST)
- PIN: 530052
- Vehicle Registration: AP31 (Former); AP39 (from 30 January 2019)

Kommadi is a suburb of the city of Visakhapatnam state of Andhra Pradesh, India.

== About ==
It is a suburb of Visakhapatnam, and known for engineering colleges and as a residential area.

== Entertainment ==
There is a multiplex called STBL Cineworld with 2 screens.

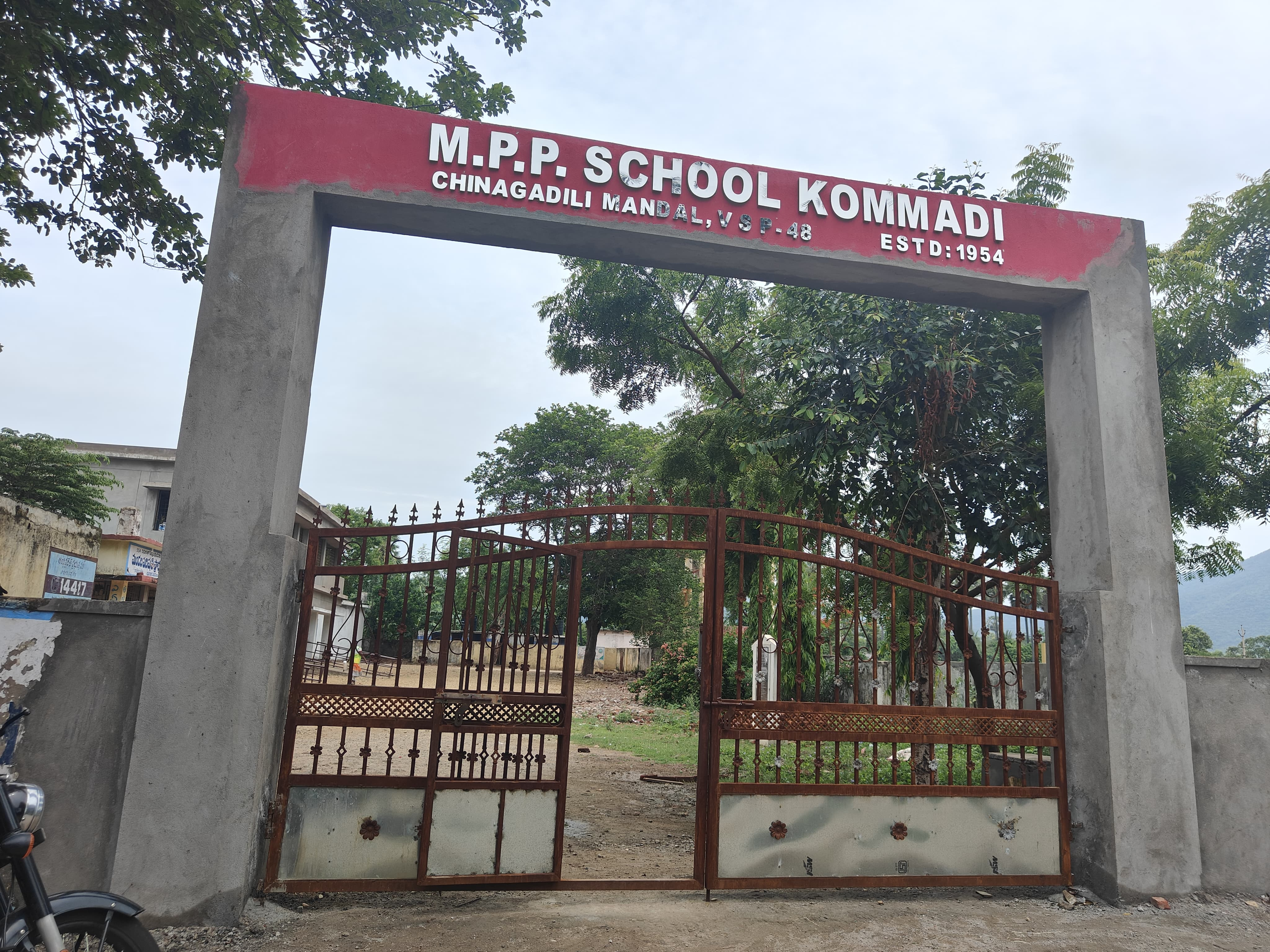
GOVERNMENT SCHOOL IN KOMMADI

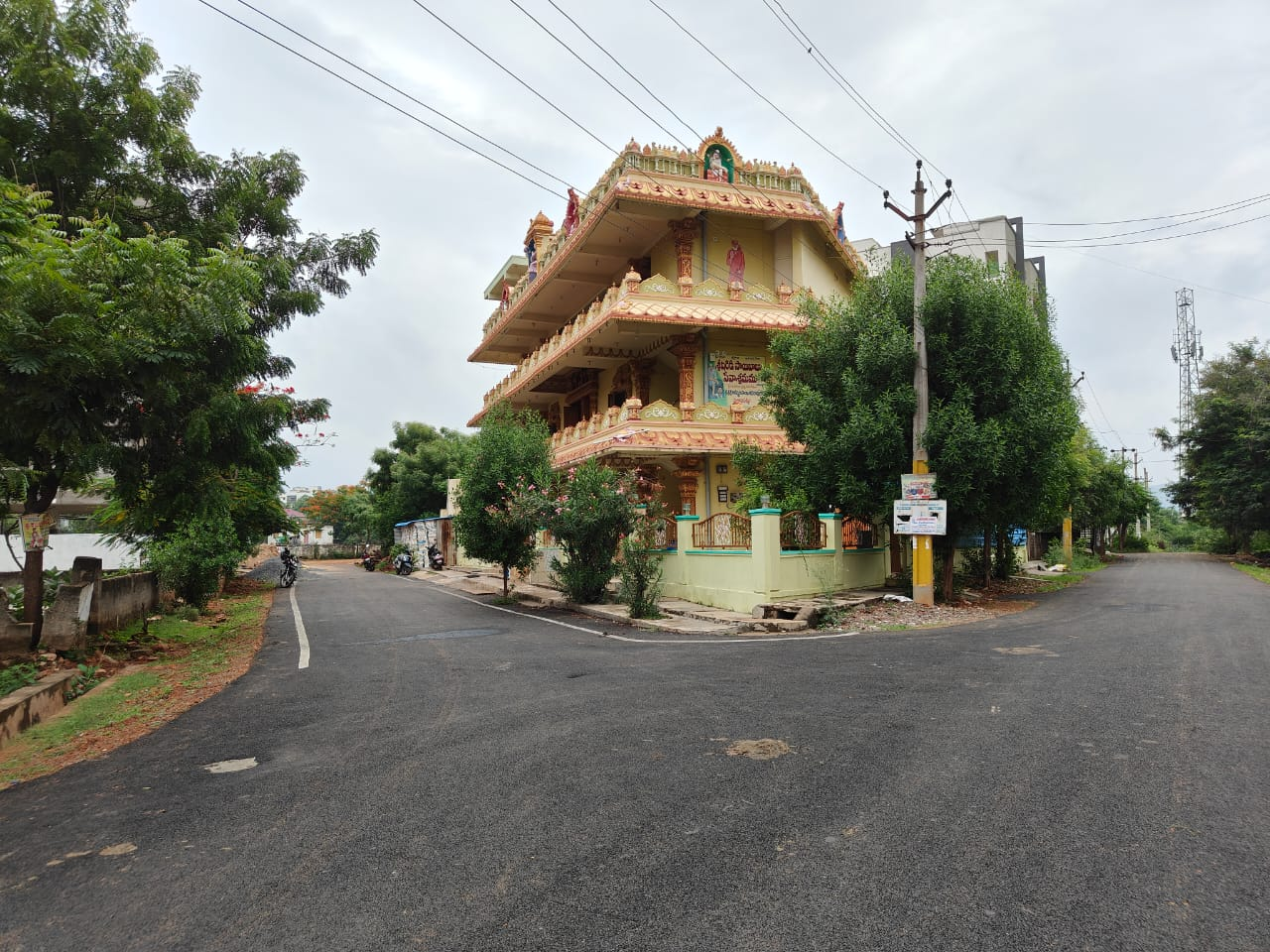
sai baba temple

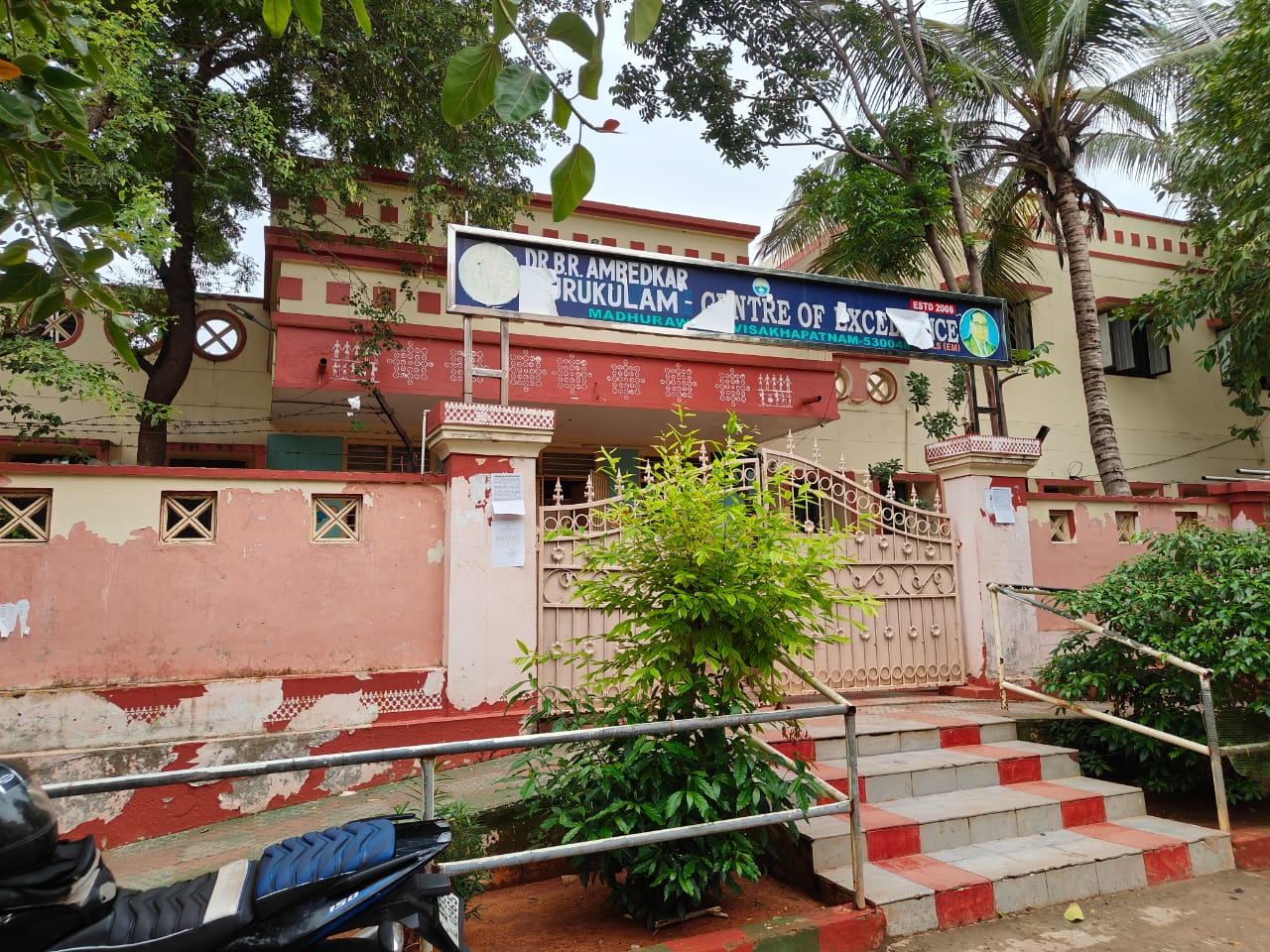
dr br ambedkar gurukulam

== Transport ==
It is well connected with Gajuwaka, NAD X Road, Maddilapalem, Dwaraka Nagar and Gopalapatnam.

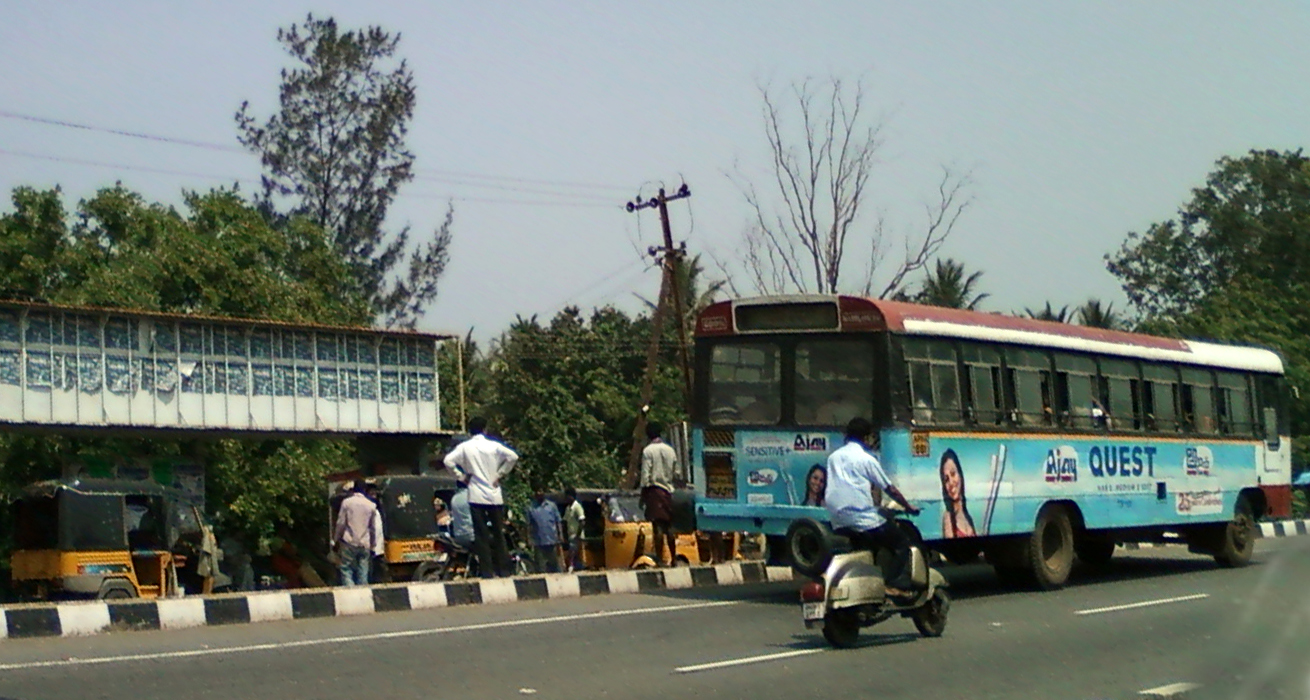
City Ordinary of APSRTC at Kommadi.

APSRTC bus routes

Route number	Start	End	Via
25M	Marikavalasa	Old Head Post Office	Madhurawada, Yendada, Hanumanthuwaka, Maddilapalem, RTC Complex, Jagadamba Centre, Town Kotharoad
25E	Kommadi	Old Head Post Office	Madhurawada, Yendada, Hanumanthuwaka, Maddilapalem, RTC Complex, Jagadamba Centre, Town Kotharoad
222	Tagarapuvalasa	RTC Complex	Anandapuram, Madhurawada, Yendada, Hanumanthuwaka, Maddilapalem, RTC Complex
999	Bhimunipatnam	RTC Complex	Anandapuram, Madhurawada, Yendada, Hanumanthuwaka, Maddilapalem, RTC Complex
111	Tagarapuvalasa	Kurmannapalem	Anandapuram, Madhurawada, Yendada, Hanumanthuwaka, Maddilapalem, RTC Complex, Jagadamba Centre, Town Kotharoad
