= Anandapuram =

- Neighbourhood
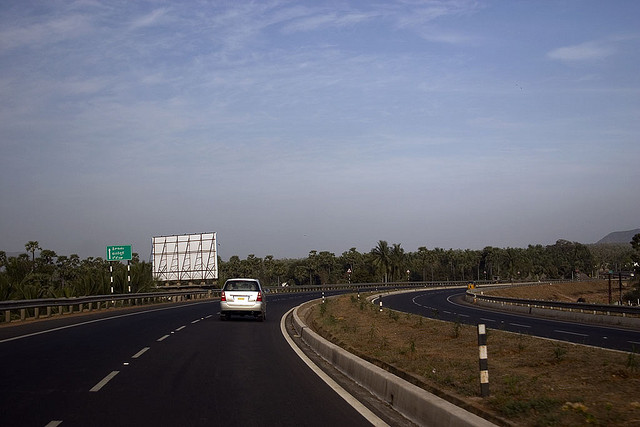
- NH16 at Anandapuram in Visakhapatnam district

- Location in Visakhapatnam
- Coordinates: 17.903343°N 83.362456°E
- Country: India
- State: Andhra Pradesh
- District: Visakhapatnam

Government
  - Body: Gram Panchayat

Population (2011)
  - Total: 7,707

Languages
  - Official: Telugu
- Time zone: UTC+5:30 (IST)
- PIN: 530052
- Vehicle Registration: AP31 (Former); AP39 (from 30 January 2019)

Anandapuram is a suburb and a mandal of Visakhapatnam district in the state of Andhra Pradesh, India.

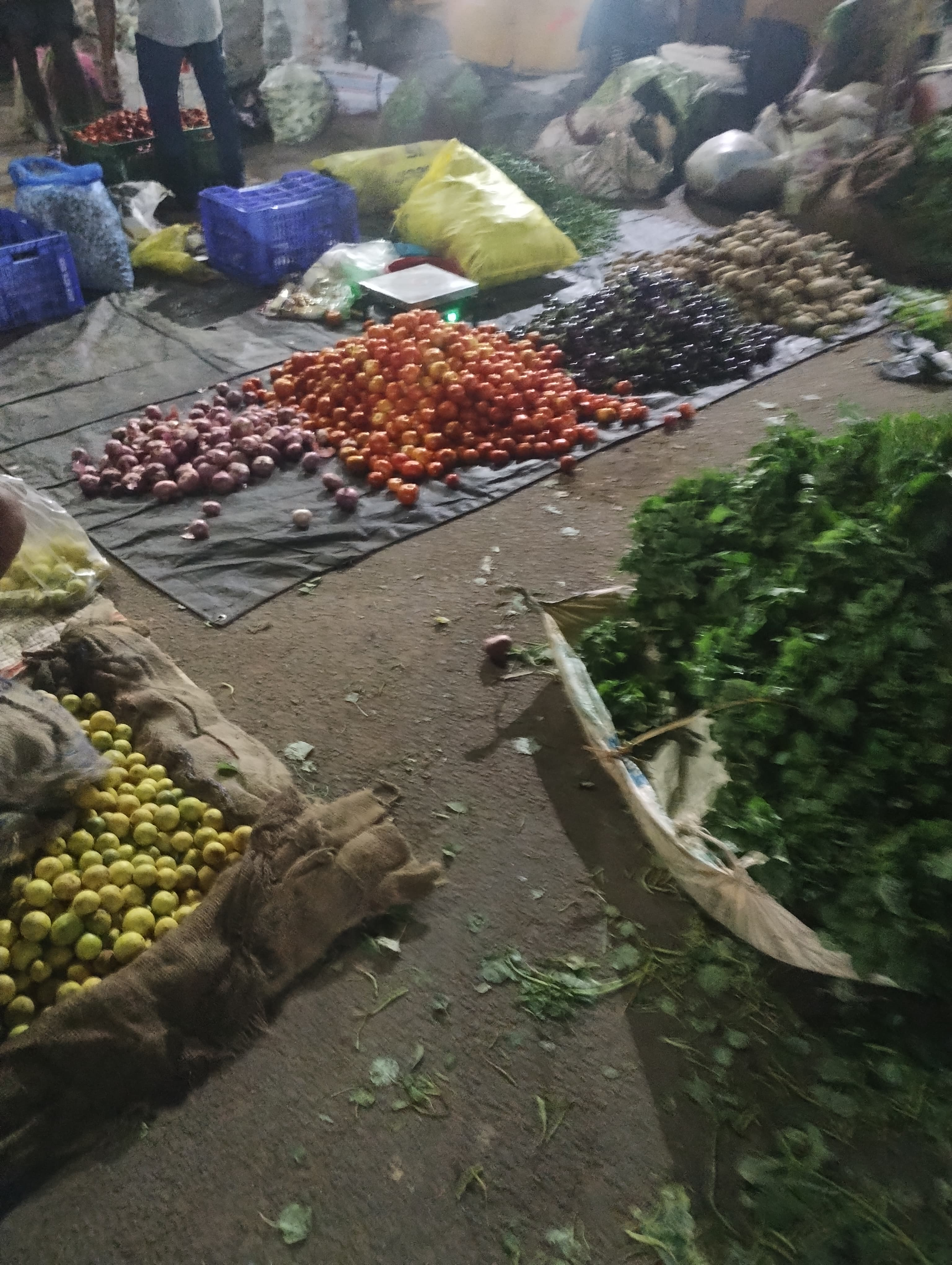
Early morning market in Anandapuram

It is a Road junction on the National Highway 16 between Visakhapatnam and Srikakulam. There is a connecting road goes to Simhachalam and Pendurthi.

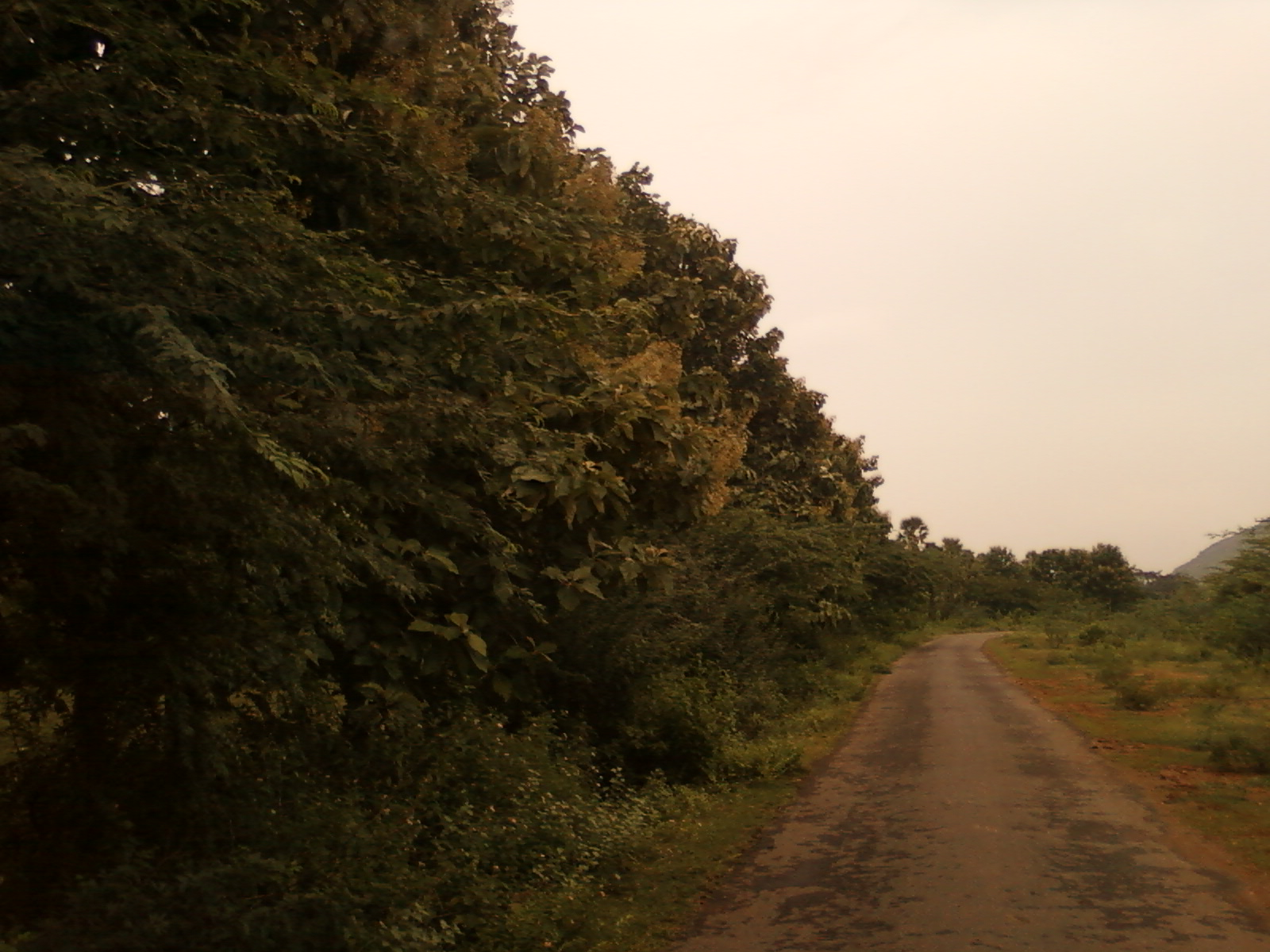
Road at Vellanki village near Anandapuram

== Transport ==
APSRTC routes

Route number	Start	End	Via
222	Tagarapuvalasa	Railway Station/RTC Complex	Anandapuram, Madhurawada, Yendada, Hanumanthuwaka, Maddilapalem
222V	Vizianagaram	RTC Complex	Tagarapuvalasa, Anandapuram, Madhurawada, Yendada, Hanumanthuwaka, Maddilapalem
111	Tagarapuvalasa	Kurmannapalem	Anandapuram, Madhurawada, Yendada, Hanumanthuwaka, Maddilapalem, Akkayapalem, Kancharapalem, NAD Junction, Gajuwaka
111V	Vizianagaram	Kurmannapalem	Tagarapuvalasa, Anandapuram, Madhurawada, Yendada, Hanumanthuwaka, Maddilapalem, Akkayapalem, Kancharapalem, NAD Junction, Gajuwaka
211	Vizianagaram	Visakhapatnam Railway Station	Tagarapuvalasa, Anandapuram, Madhurawada, Yendada, Hanumanthuwaka, Maddilapalem, RTC Complex
999	Bheemunipatnam	RTC Complex	Dorathota, Anandapuram, Madhurawada, Yendada, Hanumanthuwaka, Maddilapalem
888	Tagarapuvalasa	Anakapalli	Anandapuram, Gudilova, Sontyam, Pendurthi, Sabbavaram, Sankaram
55T	Tagarapuvalasa	Scindia	Anandapuram, Gudilova, Sontyam, Pendurthi, Vepagunta, Gopalapatnam, NAD Junction, Airport, BHPV, Gajuwaka, Malkapuram
