= Seethammadhara mandal =

- Mandal
- Interactive map of Seethammadhara mandal
- Location in Andhra Pradesh, India
- Coordinates: 17.742457°N 83.312417°E
- Country: India
- State: Andhra Pradesh
- District: Visakhapatnam
- Headquarters: Seethammadhara

Languages
  - Official: Telugu
- Time zone: UTC+5:30 (IST)

Seethammadhara mandal is one of the 11 mandals in Visakhapatnam district of Andhra Pradesh in India. Its headquarters is located at Seethammadhara. It is located in the centre of Visakhapatnam city.

There are no villages in this mandal as it is located within the jurisdiction of Greater Visakhapatnam Municipal Corporation, which is responsible for the civic amenities of Seethammadhara. The mandal is bounded by Visakhapatnam Rural to the north and Visakhapatnam Urban-2 to the east.
