= Yeddanapudi mandal =

- Mandal
- Interactive Map Outlining mandal
- Location in Andhra Pradesh, India
- Coordinates: 15.996°N 80.172°E
- Country: India
- State: Andhra Pradesh
- District: Bapatla
- Headquarters: Yeddanapudi

Area
  - Total: 105.27 km^{2} (40.64 sq mi)

Population (2011)
  - Total: 28,373
  - Density: 269.53/km^{2} (698.07/sq mi)

Languages
  - Official: Telugu
- Time zone: UTC+5:30 (IST)

Yeddanapudi is a mandal in Bapatla revenue division of the Bapatla district in the Coastal Andhra region of Andhra Pradesh, India. Its headquarters are in Yeddanapudi.

== Demographics ==
Religions in Yeddanapudi mandal (2011)
Religion	Percent
Hinduism	93.18%
Islam	6.47%
Other or not stated	0.35%
Distribution of religions

As of 2011 census, the mandal had a population of 28,373 in 8,138 households. The total population constitutes 13,417 males and 14,956 females — a sex ratio of 1115 females per 1000 males. 2,453 children are in the age group of 0–6 years, of which 1,280 are boys and 1,173 are girls — a sex ratio of 916 per 1000. The average literacy rate stands at 65.30% with 16,927 literates. Scheduled Castes and Scheduled Tribes make up 9,280 (32.71%) and 617 (2.17%) of the population respectively.

Languages of Yeddanapudi mandal (2011)
1. Telugu (95.3%)
2. Urdu (4.62%)
3. Others (0.03%)

At the time of the 2011 census, 95.35% of the population spoke Telugu and 4.62% Urdu as their first language.
