= Visakhapatnam district =

District in Andhra Pradesh, India

- District of Andhra Pradesh
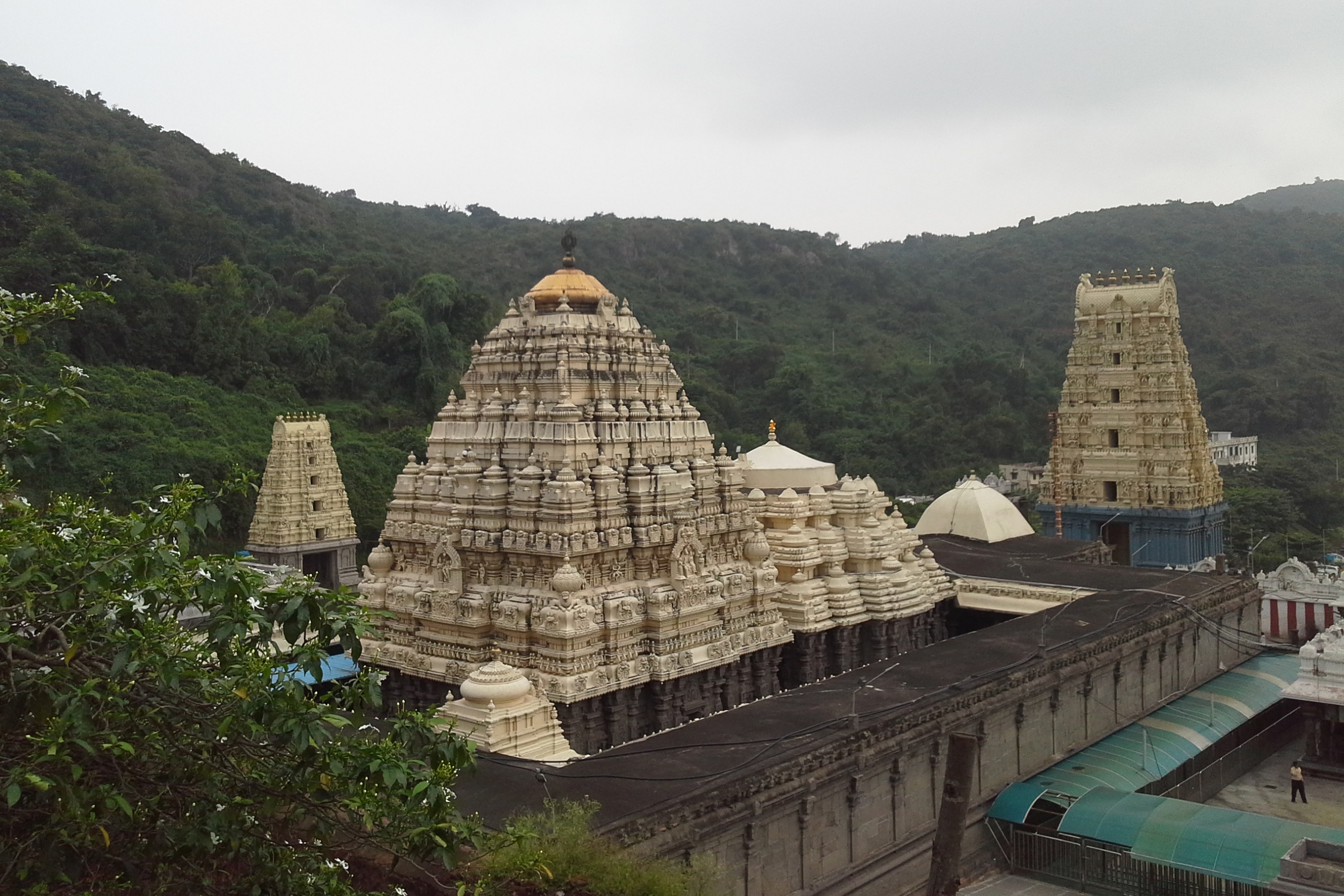
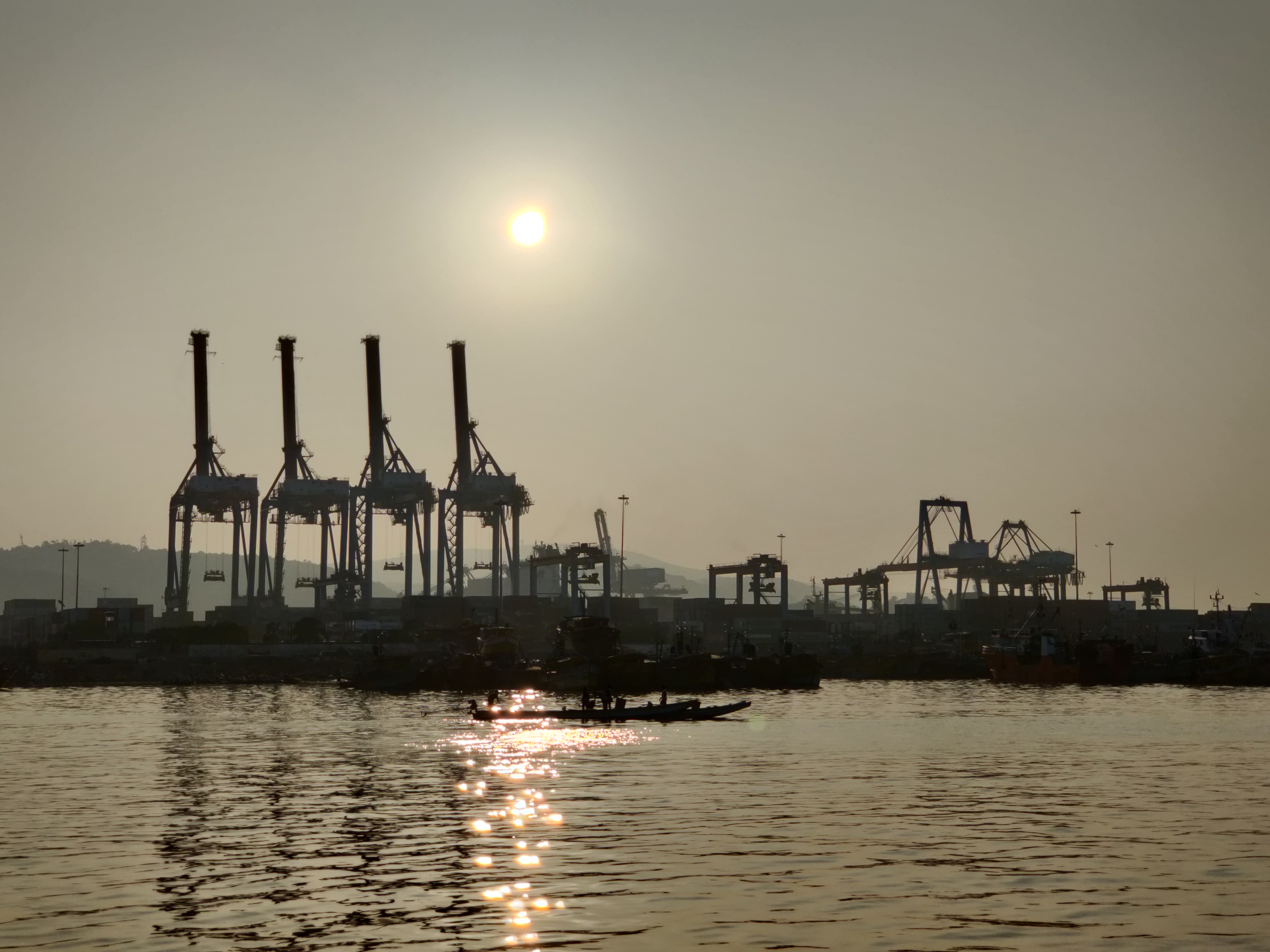
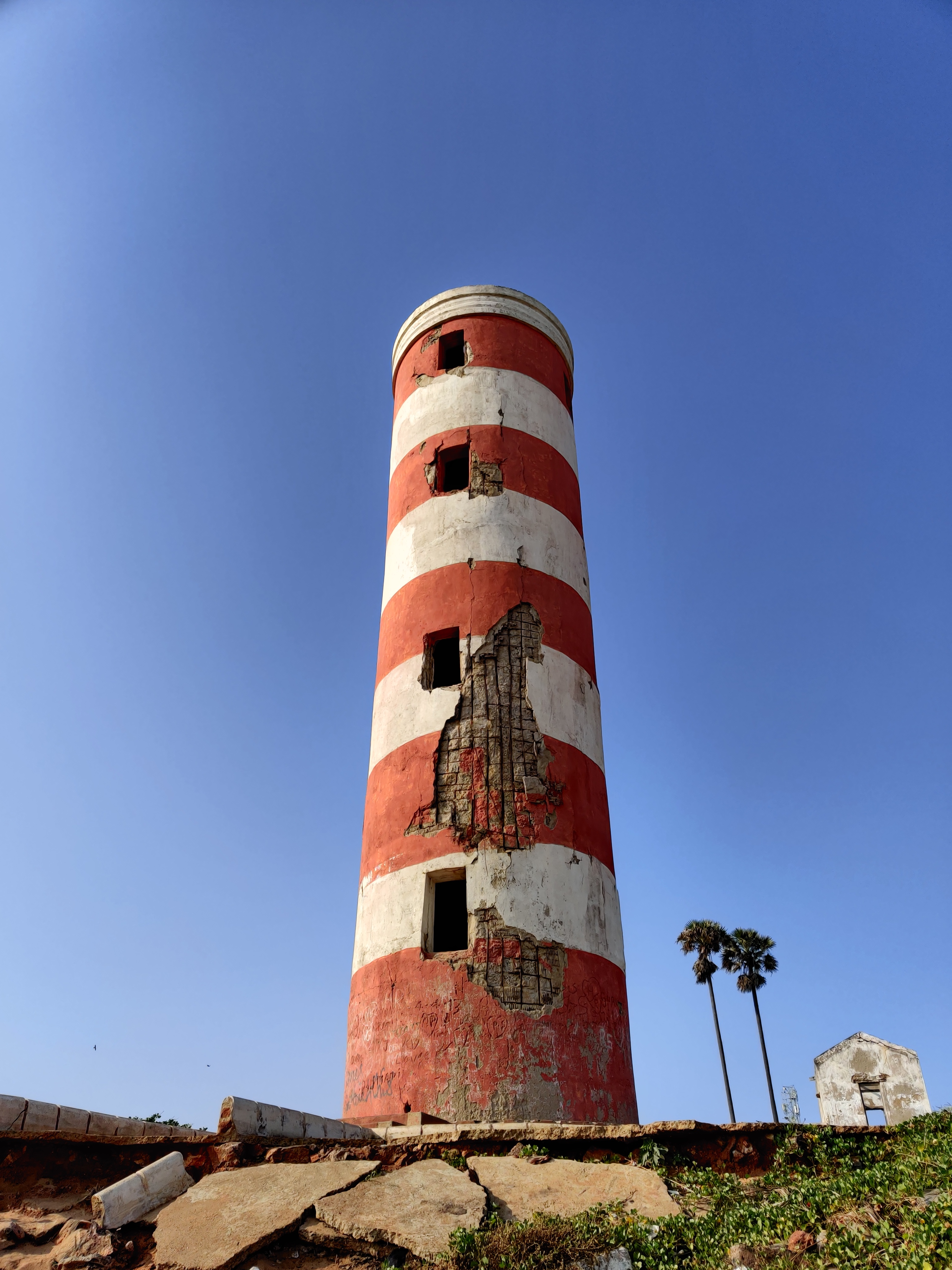
- Simhachalam Temple Visakhapatnam Port Lighthouse at Visakhapatnam beach road

- Location of Visakhapatnam district in Andhra Pradesh
- Interactive map of Visakhapatnam district
- Coordinates: 17.7°N 83.3°E
- Country: India
- State: Andhra Pradesh
- Region: Uttara Andhra
- Created: 1 April 1936
- Headquarters: Visakhapatnam
- Administrative Divisions: 02 revenue divisions; 11 mandals

Government
  - District collector and magistrate: M N Harendhira Prasad IAS
  - Lok Sabha constituencies: 01 constituency
  - Assembly constituencies: 06 constituencies

Area
  - Total: 1,048 km^{2} (405 sq mi)
  - Rank: 28th

Population (2011)
  - Total: 1,959,544
  - Rank: 13th
  - Density: 1,869.8/km^{2} (4,843/sq mi)
  - Rank: 1st
  - Urban: 1,757,542
  - Sex ratio: 1,006♀️/1,000♂️

Languages
  - Official: Telugu

Literacy
- Time zone: UTC+5:30 (IST)
- Postal Index Number: 530xxx
- Area codes: +91–0891
- ISO 3166 code: IN-AP
- Vehicle registration: AP-31, AP–39 (from 30 January 2019)
- District LGD code: 520
- District abbreviation: VSK
- GDP (2022-23): ₹119,268 crore (equivalent to ₹1.3 trillion or US$14 billion in 2026)
- Per capita income (2022–23): ₹483,892 (equivalent to ₹530,000 or US$5,600 in 2026)
- Website: visakhapatnam.ap.gov.in

Visakhapatnam district is a district in the Uttarandhra region of the Indian state of Andhra Pradesh, headquartered at Visakhapatnam. It is one of the twenty-eight districts in Andhra Pradesh state. The district shares borders with Vizianagaram district in north and south-east and with Anakapalli district in the south-west and Bay of Bengal in the south.

== History ==
During the British rule in India, Visakhapatnam emerged as a district in the year 1802. Chicacole (present-day Srikakulam) which was in Visakhapatnam district was incorporated into Ganjam when the latter was formed as a district. On 1 April 1936, Bihar and Orissa Province was split to form Bihar Province and Orissa Province. Parts of the Vizagapatam district (i.e., Nabarangpur, Malkangiri, Koraput, Jeypore, Rayagada etc.) and the Ganjam district (excluding Chicacole division) of Madras Presidency were transferred to Orissa Province along with portions of the Vizagapatam Hill Tracts Agency and Ganjam Hill Tracts Agency. The Chicacole division (i.e., Ichchapuram, Palasa, Tekkali, Pathapatnam and Srikakulam) was merged with Visakhapatnam district.

Later, in 1950, Srikakulam district was carved out from the erstwhile Visakhapatnam district. In 1979, part of the district was split to form Vizianagaram district. Visakhapatnam district is currently a part of the Red corridor.

On 3 April 2022, Government of Andhra Pradesh created 13 new districts in the state, hence the district was once again divided into three i.e., Visakhapatnam, Anakapalli and Alluri Sitharama Raju districts. This made Vizag the only district with 90% urban population in AP.

=== Historical demographics ===
Historical population
Year	Pop.	±% p.a.
1901	992,833	—
1911	1,056,683	+0.63%
1921	1,057,223	+0.01%
1931	1,175,984	+1.07%
1941	1,314,362	+1.12%
1951	1,483,653	+1.22%
1961	1,665,213	+1.16%
1971	2,035,831	+2.03%
1981	2,576,474	+2.38%
1991	3,285,092	+2.46%
2001	3,832,336	+1.55%
2011	4,290,589	+1.14%

According to the 2011 census Visakhapatnam district has a population of 4,290,589. This gives it a ranking of 44 in India (out of a total of 640 districts) and fourth in the state. The district has a population density of 384 inhabitants per square kilometre (990/sq mi). Its population growth rate over the decade 2001–2011 was 11.89%. It has a sex ratio of 1003 females for every 1000 males, and a literacy rate of 67.7%.

== Geography ==
Visakhapatnam district occupies an area of approximately 1,048 square kilometres (405 sq mi), comparatively equivalent to United States Atka Island.

Climate

Climate data for Visakhapatnam
Month	Jan	Feb	Mar	Apr	May	Jun	Jul	Aug	Sep	Oct	Nov	Dec	Year
Mean daily maximum °C (°F)	28.9 (84.0)	31.3 (88.3)	33.8 (92.8)	35.3 (95.5)	36.2 (97.2)	35.3 (95.5)	32.9 (91.2)	32.7 (90.9)	32.5 (90.5)	31.7 (89.1)	30.4 (86.7)	28.9 (84.0)	32.5 (90.5)
Mean daily minimum °C (°F)	18.0 (64.4)	19.9 (67.8)	23.0 (73.4)	26.1 (79.0)	27.7 (81.9)	27.3 (81.1)	26.1 (79.0)	26.0 (78.8)	25.6 (78.1)	24.3 (75.7)	21.6 (70.9)	18.6 (65.5)	23.7 (74.7)
Average precipitation mm (inches)	11.4 (0.45)	7.7 (0.30)	7.5 (0.30)	27.6 (1.09)	57.8 (2.28)	105.6 (4.16)	134.6 (5.30)	141.2 (5.56)	174.8 (6.88)	204.3 (8.04)	65.3 (2.57)	7.9 (0.31)	945.7 (37.23)

== Politics ==
There are two parliamentary and seven assembly constituencies in Visakhapatnam district. The parliamentary constituencies are

• Anakapalli (Lok Sabha constituency)

- Visakhapatnam (Lok Sabha constituency)

The assembly constituencies are

Constituency number	Name	Parliament
20	Bheemili	Visakhapatnam
21	Visakhapatnam East	Visakhapatnam
22	Visakhapatnam West	Visakhapatnam
23	Visakhapatnam North	Visakhapatnam
24	Visakhapatnam South	Visakhapatnam
25	Gajuwaka	Visakhapatnam
31	Pendurthi (partially) Pendurthi and Pedagantyada mandals	Anakapalli

== Administrative divisions ==
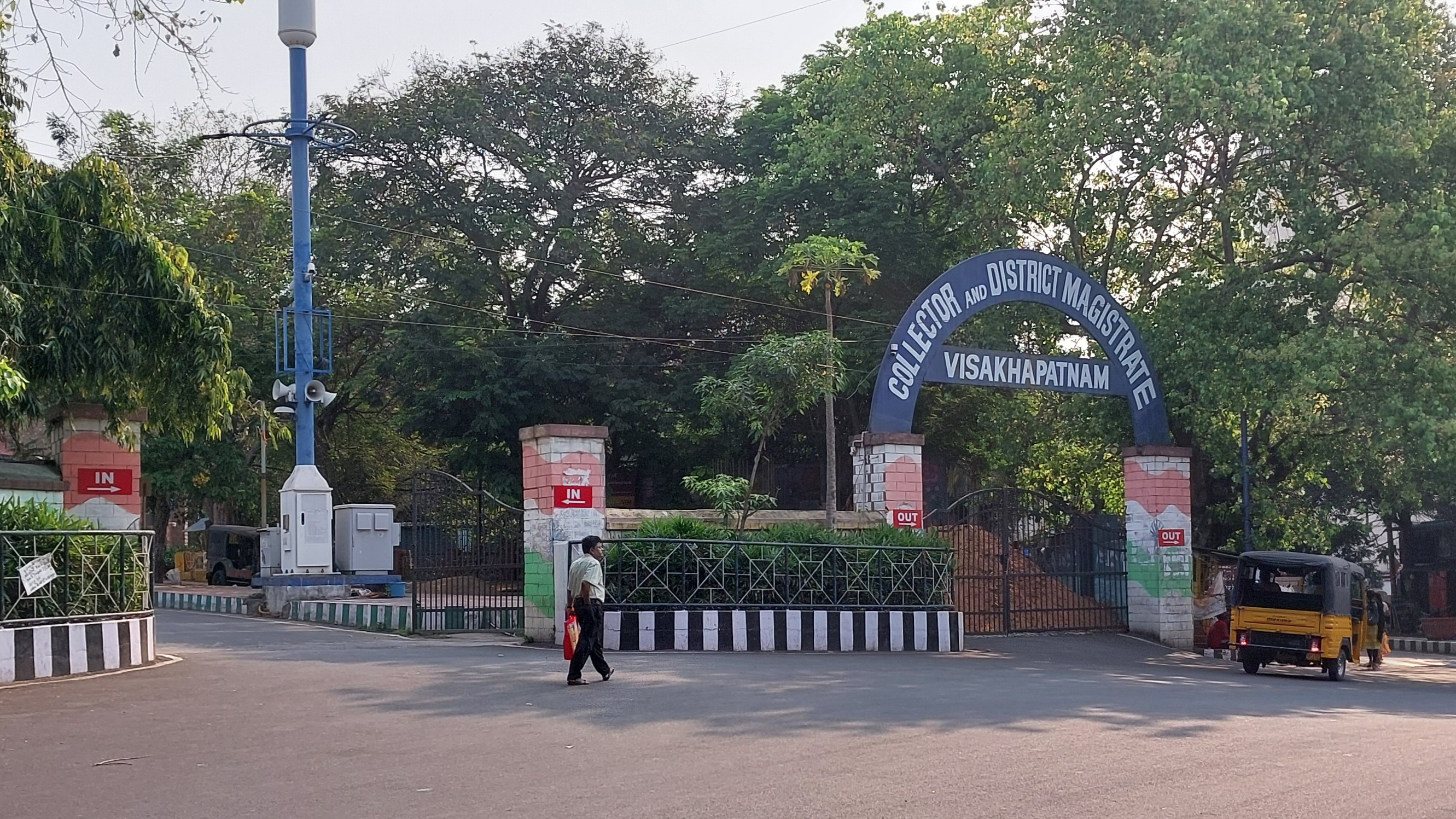
Collectorate Building, Visakhapatnam

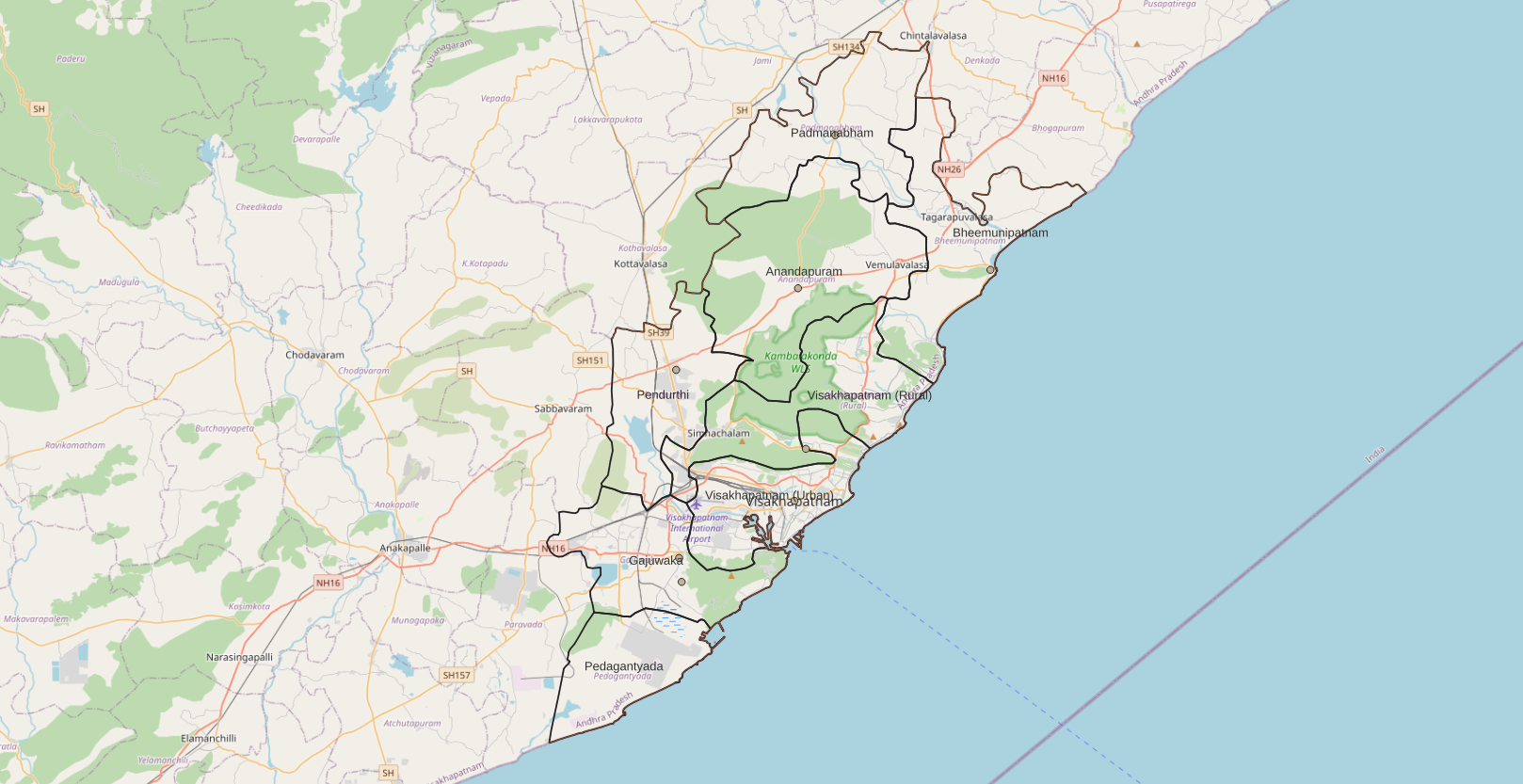
Satellite view of Visakhapatnam district

The district is divided into two revenue divisions: Bheemunipatnam and Visakhapatnam, which are further subdivided into a total of eleven mandals, each headed by a sub district collector.

=== Mandals ===
The list of eleven mandals in Visakhapatnam district, divided into two revenue divisions, is given below.

1. Bheemunipatnam revenue division
  1. Bheemunipatnam
  2. Anandapuram
  3. Padmanabham
  4. Visakhapatnam Rural
  5. Seethammadhara
2. Visakhapatnam revenue division
  1. Gajuwaka
  2. Pedagantyada
  3. Gopalapatnam
  4. Mulagada
  5. Maharanipeta
  6. Pendurthi

=== Cities and towns ===
S.No.	City / town	Civic status of town	No.of Wards	Municipality Formation year	2011 census population
1	GVMC	Municipal corporation	98	1979	20,37,944

== Demographics ==
After reorganization, Visakhapatnam district had a population of 1,959,544, of which 1,757,542 (89.69%) live in urban areas. The district has a sex ratio of 983 females per 1000 males. Scheduled Castes and Scheduled Tribes made up 167,272 (8.54%) and 22,574 (1.15%) of the population respectively.It has a literacy rate of 80.1%.

Religions in Visakhapatnam district (2011)
Religion	Percent
Hinduism	93.03%
Islam	3.47%
Christianity	2.82%
Other or not stated	0.68%
Distribution of religions

Languages of Visakhapatnam district (2011)
1. Telugu (92.9%)
2. Urdu (2.47%)
3. Hindi (1.96%)
4. Others (2.64%)

At the time of the 2011 census, 92.93% of the population spoke Telugu, 2.47% Urdu, and 1.96% Hindi as their first language. Although in the past ten years many people from outside AP have migrated to Vizag for a living, so the linguistic statistics have rapidly changed. In Vizag one can find sign boards of busy markets written in languages namely English, and Hindi respectively.

Statistics for Old Vizag district
Total population	42,90,589
Males	21,38,910
Females	21,51,679
Growth (2001-2011)	11.89%
Rural	22,54,667 (52.55%)
Urban	20,35,922 (47.45%)

== Economy ==
The Gross District Domestic Product (GDDP) of the district is ₹73,276 crore (US$7.8 billion) and it contributes 14% to the Gross State Domestic Product (GSDP). For the FY 2013–14, the per capita income at current prices was ₹124,162 (US$1,300). The primary, secondary and tertiary sectors of the district contribute ₹6,300 crore (US$670 million), ₹21,654 crore (US$2.3 billion) and ₹45,321 crore (US$4.8 billion) respectively. The major products contributing to the GVA of the district from agriculture and allied services are, sugarcane, paddy, betel leaves, mango, milk, meat and fisheries. The GVA to the industrial and service sector is contributed from manufacturing, construction, minor minerals, software services and unorganised trade.

== Transport ==
The total road length of state highways in the district is 964 km (599 mi).

== Education ==
The primary and secondary school education is imparted by government, aided and private schools, under the School Education Department of the state. They include 162 government, 2,793 mandal and zilla parishads, 9 residential, 1225 private, 5 model, 34 Kasturba Gandhi Balika Vidyalaya (KGBV), 147 municipal and 829 other types of schools. The total number of students enrolled in primary, upper primary and high schools of the district are 609,587.

== Culture ==
There are thirty six temples under the management of Endowments Department.

== Sport ==
ACA–VDCA Cricket Stadium also known as Andhra Cricket Association–Visakhapatnam District Cricket Association Cricket Stadium is an international cricket stadium located at Madhurawada, Visakhapatnam.

The stadium had its inaugural ODI match against Pakistan, during which Mahendra Singh Dhoni achieved his first one-day international century, scoring 148 runs, in 2005. Following its elevation to Test status, the stadium held its inaugural test match in November 2016, featuring India and England. In February 2016, it hosted its first T20I match, featuring India and Sri Lanka. Additionally, the stadium served as the venue for several IPL matches and served as the home ground for the Deccan Chargers in 2012.

== Notable people ==
- Alluri Sitarama Raju, freedom fighter
- Tenneti Viswanadham, politician
- Sri Sri (writer), writer
- Parasuram (director), writer and director
- Sricharan Pakala, music director
- Ramana Gogula, music director
- Satyadev, film actor
- Nikita Dutta, Bollywood actress
- Devika Rani, Bollywood actress
- Waheeda Rehman, Bollywood actress
- Mayuri Deshmukh, Indian television actress
- Prince Cecil, Tollywood actor
- Viva Harsha, Tollywood comedian
- Shanmukh Jaswanth, Tollywood actor
- Raja Abel, Tollywood actor
- Raj Tarun, Tollwood actor
- Rashmi Gautam, TV host and actress in Tollywood
- L. V. Revanth, Indian singer
- Shanmukha Priya, singer and a former child prodigy
- K. S. Bharat, Indian cricketer
