= Visakhapatnam =

Metropolis in Andhra Pradesh, India

Visakhapatnam Vizag, Visakha, Waltair
- Metropolis
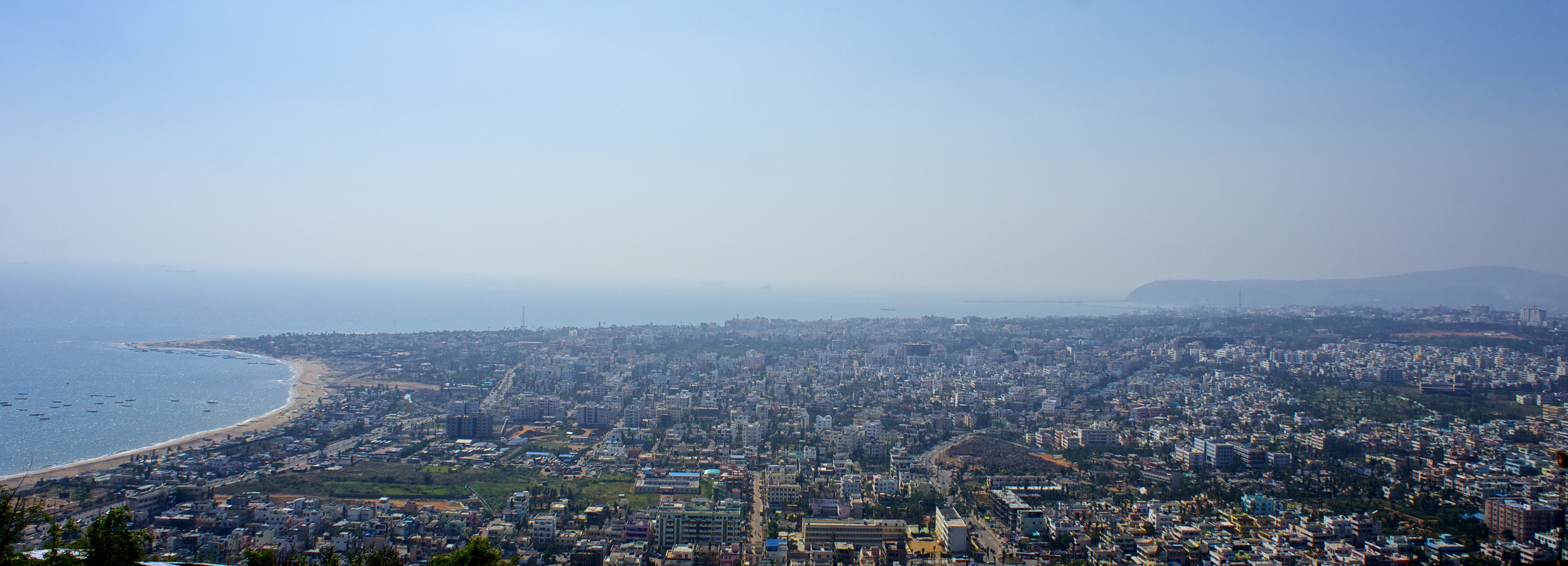
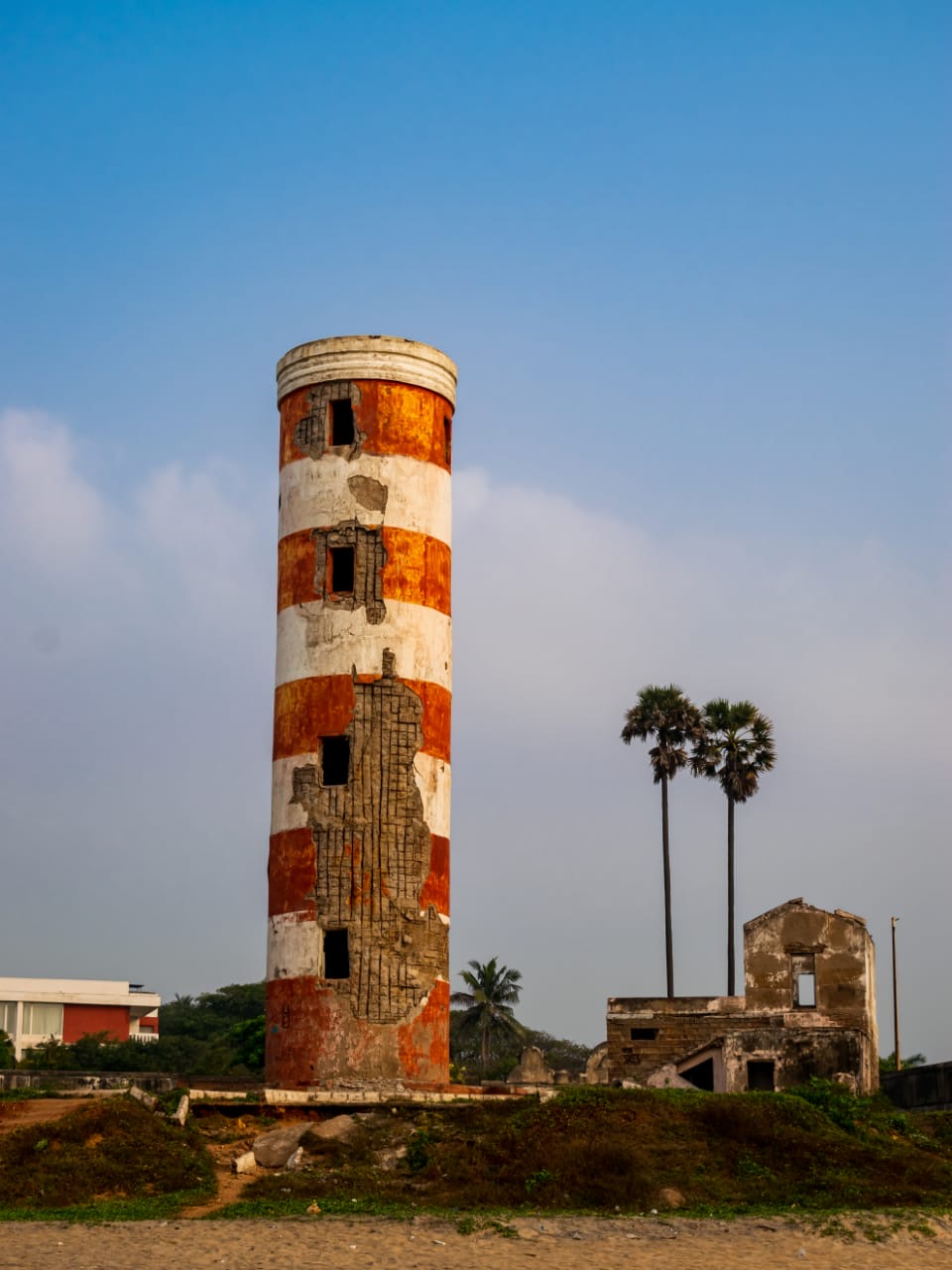
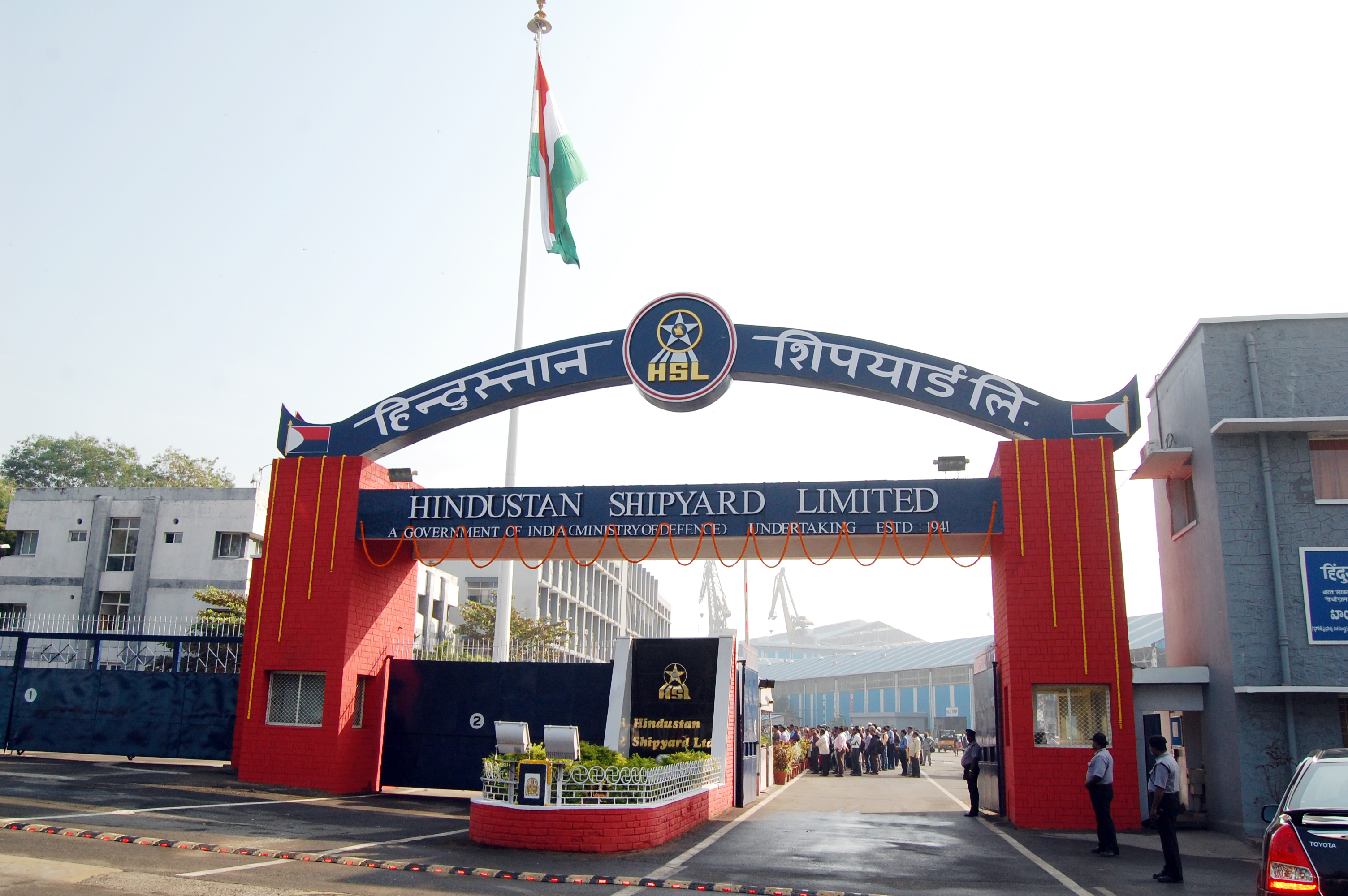
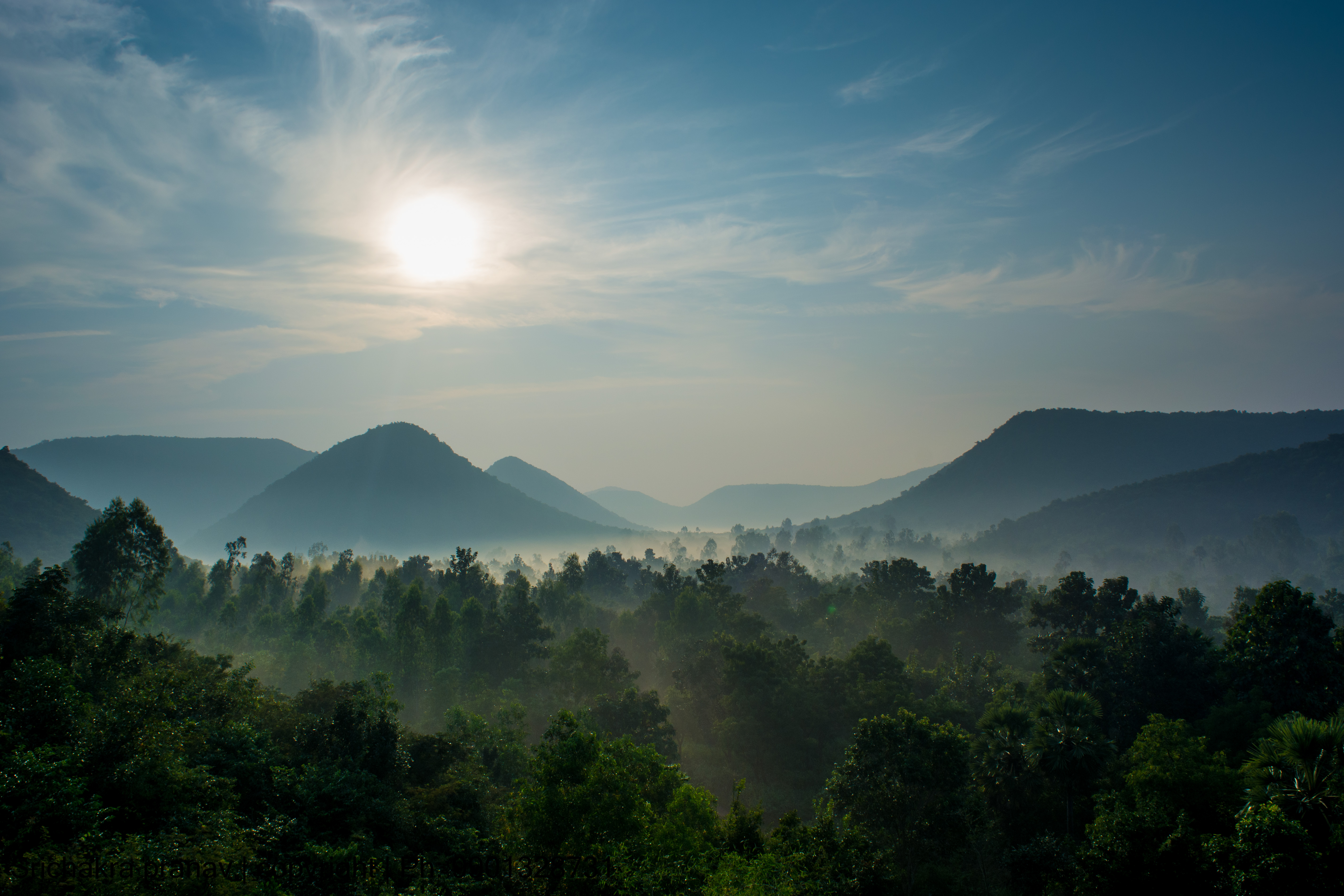
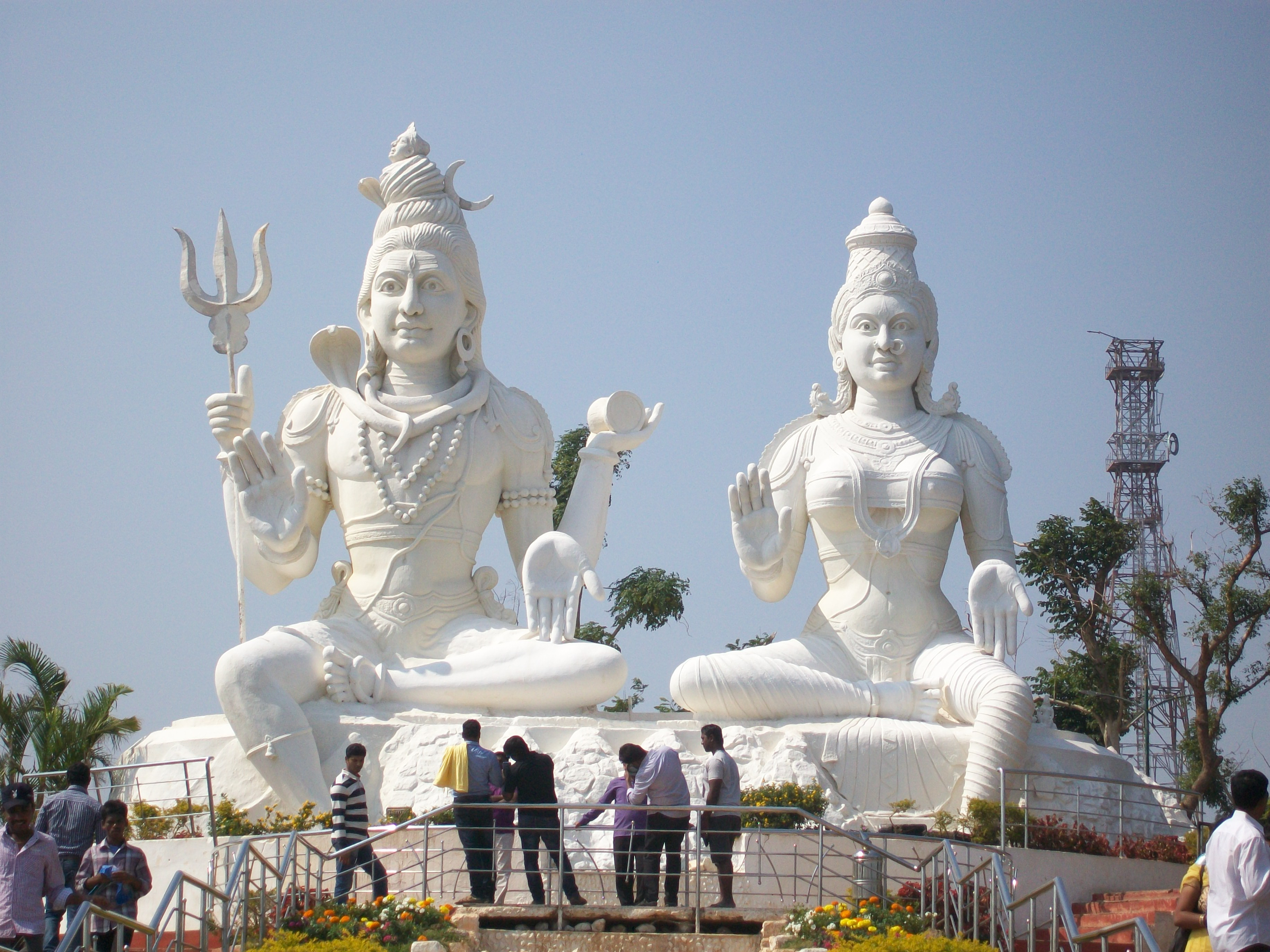
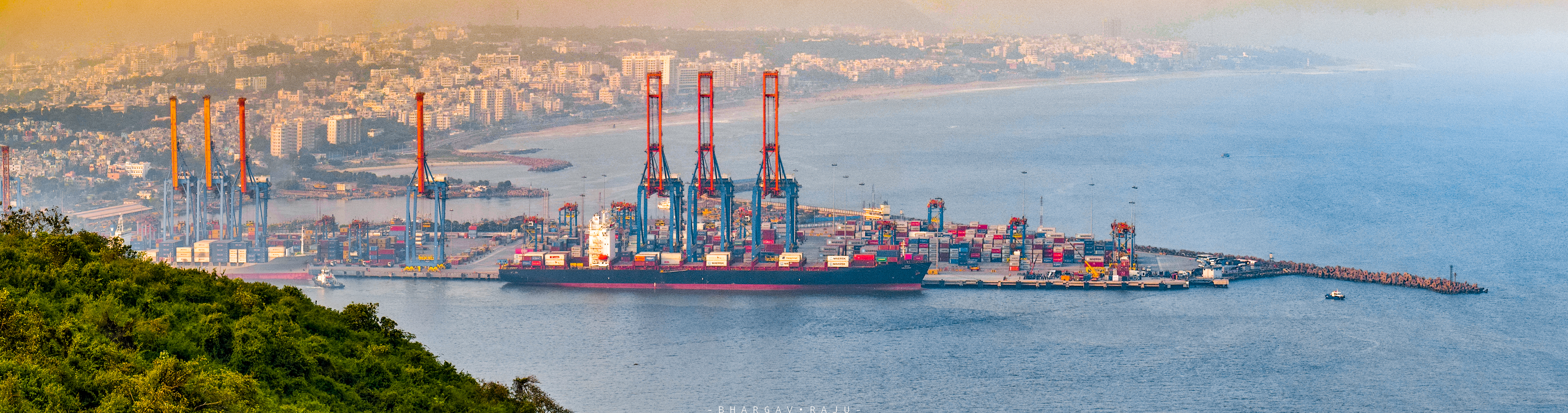
- Skyline of Visakhapatnam Old Vizag Lighthouse on RK Beach Hindustan Shipyard Kambalakonda Wildlife Sanctuary Lord Shiva & Parvathi statues on Kailasagiri Visakhapatnam Port
- Nicknames: The City of Destiny; The Jewel of the East Coast
- Interactive map of Visakhapatnam
- Location within Visakhapatnam Location within Andhra Pradesh Location within India
- Coordinates: 17°41′38″N 83°17′32″E
- Country: India
- State: Andhra Pradesh
- Districts: Visakhapatnam, Anakapalli
- Incorporated (town): 1865
- Incorporated (city): 1979

Government
  - Type: Municipal Corporation
  - Body: GVMC, VMRDA
  - Mayor: Vacant (since 18 March 2026)

Area
  - Metropolis: 640 km^{2} (250 sq mi)
  - Metro: 7,328.86 km^{2} (2,829.69 sq mi)

Population (2011)
  - Metropolis: 2,091,811
  - Estimate (2021): 2,358,412
  - Rank: 17th
  - Density: 3,300/km^{2} (8,500/sq mi)
- Demonym(s): visākhavāru, vaijāgvāḍu (Telugu), Vizagite (English)
- Time zone: UTC+5:30 (IST)
- PIN: 530 0XX, 531 1XX
- Telephone code: +91-891
- Vehicle registration: AP-31, AP-32, AP-33, AP-34, AP-39
- Official languages: Telugu
- Nominal GDP(2024) (Note: The following GDP Constitutes only for GVMC limits): US$43 billion
- Contribution to state as a % of GDP: 23.12%
- Website: GVMC (Note: Greater Visakhapatnam Municipal Corporation); VMRDA (Note: Visakhapatnam Metropolitan Region Development Authority); District Authority

Visakhapatnam (/vɪˌsɑːkəˈpʌtnəm/; formerly known as Vizagapatam, and also referred to as Vizag, Visakha, and Waltair) is the largest and most populous city in the Indian state of Andhra Pradesh. It is between the Eastern Ghats and the coast of the Bay of Bengal. It is the second largest city on the east coast of India after Chennai, and the fourth largest in South India. It is one of the four smart cities of Andhra Pradesh selected under the Smart Cities Mission and is the headquarters of Visakhapatnam district. Vizag is popularly known as shipbuilding capital of India due to presence of multiple shipyards such as Hindustan Shipyard, Naval Dockyard and being the central naval command of the east coast. As the economic hub of Andhra Pradesh, the city hosts diversified economy with the presence of heavy industries, ports, logistics, pharmaceuticals, medtech, biotechnology, energy production, tourism, textiles, R&D and a growing information technology and financial technology center. It is also described as the City of Destiny and the Jewel of the East Coast.

Visakhapatnam's history dates back to the 6th century BCE. Historically considered part of the Kalinga region.The city was ruled by the Andhra Satavahanas, Vengi, the Pallava, Eastern Ganga dynasties and Gajapati dynasty. Visakhapatnam was an ancient port city which had trade relations with the Middle East and Rome. Ships in Visakhapatnam were anchored at open roads and loaded with cargo transported from the shoreside using small masula boats. A reference to a Vizagapatnam merchant is available in the inscriptions of Bheemeswara temple (1068 CE) in the East Godavari District. During the 12th century CE, Vizagapatnam was a fortified mercantile town managed by a guild. European powers eventually established trade operations in the city, and by the end of the 18th century it had come under French colonial rule. Control of the city passed to the East India Company in 1804 and it remained under British colonial rule until Indian independence in 1947.

The city is home to some reputed Central and State educational institutions of the state, including Andhra University (AU), Andhra Medical College (AMC), Indian Institute of Management (IIM), Indian Institute of Petroleum and Energy (IIPE), Damodaram Sanjivayya National Law University (DSNLU), Indian Maritime University (IMU), and the National Institute of Oceanography among others. Visakhapatnam serves as the headquarters for the Indian Navy's Eastern Naval Command. The city also serves as the zonal headquarters of South Coast Railway Zone (SCoR). The city is also home to the oldest shipyard and the only natural harbour on the east coast of India. Visakhapatnam Port is the fifth-busiest cargo port in India. The city is a major tourist destination and is known for its beaches, ancient Buddhist sites, and the natural environment of the surrounding Eastern Ghats. According to the Swachh Survekshan rankings of 2020, it is the ninth cleanest city in India among cities with a population of more than 1 million. In 2020, it was a finalist in the Living and Inclusion category of the World Smart City Awards.

== Etymology ==
The local belief behind the name of the city states that there was a king in the 4th century, who on his pilgrimage halted at Lawson's Bay and built a temple dedicated to Vaisakha, which was submerged under the sea, but the name of the temple became attached to the settlement. Other historical names are, Kulotungapatnam, named by the Chola King Kulottunga I; Ishakapatnam, based on a Muslim Saint, Syed Ali Madani (Ishak Madani). During the East India Company rule in India, the city was known with the name, Vizagapatnam. The suburb Waltair is another such name which was derived from the name the British colonial government used. "Vizagapatnam" could also be spelled Visakhapatnam in the West European alphabet. The name was popularly shortened to Vizag and this form was in use right from the earliest days of British colonial rule in the district in the late eighteenth century. It is still referred to as Vizag by locals too; however, since independence, people have reverted to calling it by its Indian name of Visakhapatnam.

== History ==
Visakhapatnam's history stretches back to the 6th century BCE and the city finds mention in ancient texts such as the 4th century BCE writings of Pāṇini and Katyayana. Historically considered part of the Kalinga region, it was ruled by the Vengi kingdom and the Pallava and Eastern Ganga dynasties during medieval times. Archaeological records suggest that the present city was built around the 11th and 12th centuries C.E. by the Chola dynasty king Kulothunga I. Control over the city fluctuated between the Chola dynasty of Tamil Nadu and the Gajapati Kingdom of Odisha until its conquest by the Vijayanagara Empire in the 15th century.

The city was ruled by the Andhra Kings of Vengi and Pallavas. The city is named after Sri Visakha Varma. Legend has it that Radha and Viśakha were born on the same day and were equally beautiful. Sri Visakka Sakhi is the second most important gopi of the eight main gopis. She carries messages between Radha and Krishna and is the most expert Gopi messenger. Residents believe that an Andhra king built a temple to pay homage to his family deity Viśakha. This is now inundated under seawater near RK Beach. Another theory is that it is named after a woman disciple of Buddha named Viśakha. Later it was ruled by Kingdom of Jeypore (1535–1571), Qutb Shahis (1571–1674) and (1674–1711), Mughal Empire (1711–1724) and Nizam (1724–1757). The French (1757) and British (1765) established Factories and influence over the city. In 1794 the Battle of Padmanabham occurred between the Zamindari of Vizianagaram and the East India Company. after the battle, Vizianagaram estate was acquired by the East India company in 1802. On 18 September 1804 the Battle of Visakhapatnam was fought between the French and British and the city remained the under British colonial rule until Indian independence in 1947 which was a part of the Northern Circars.

=== Buddhist influence ===
Hindu texts state that during the fifth century BCE, the Visakhapatnam region was part of Kalinga territory, which extended to the Godavari river. Relics found in the area also prove the existence of a Buddhist empire in the region. Kalinga later lost the territory to King Ashoka in the bloodiest battle of its time, which prompted Ashoka to embrace Buddhism. Ancient Buddhist sites, recently excavated, are scattered across Visakhapatnam, reflecting the region's Buddhist legacy.

==== Pavurallakonda ====
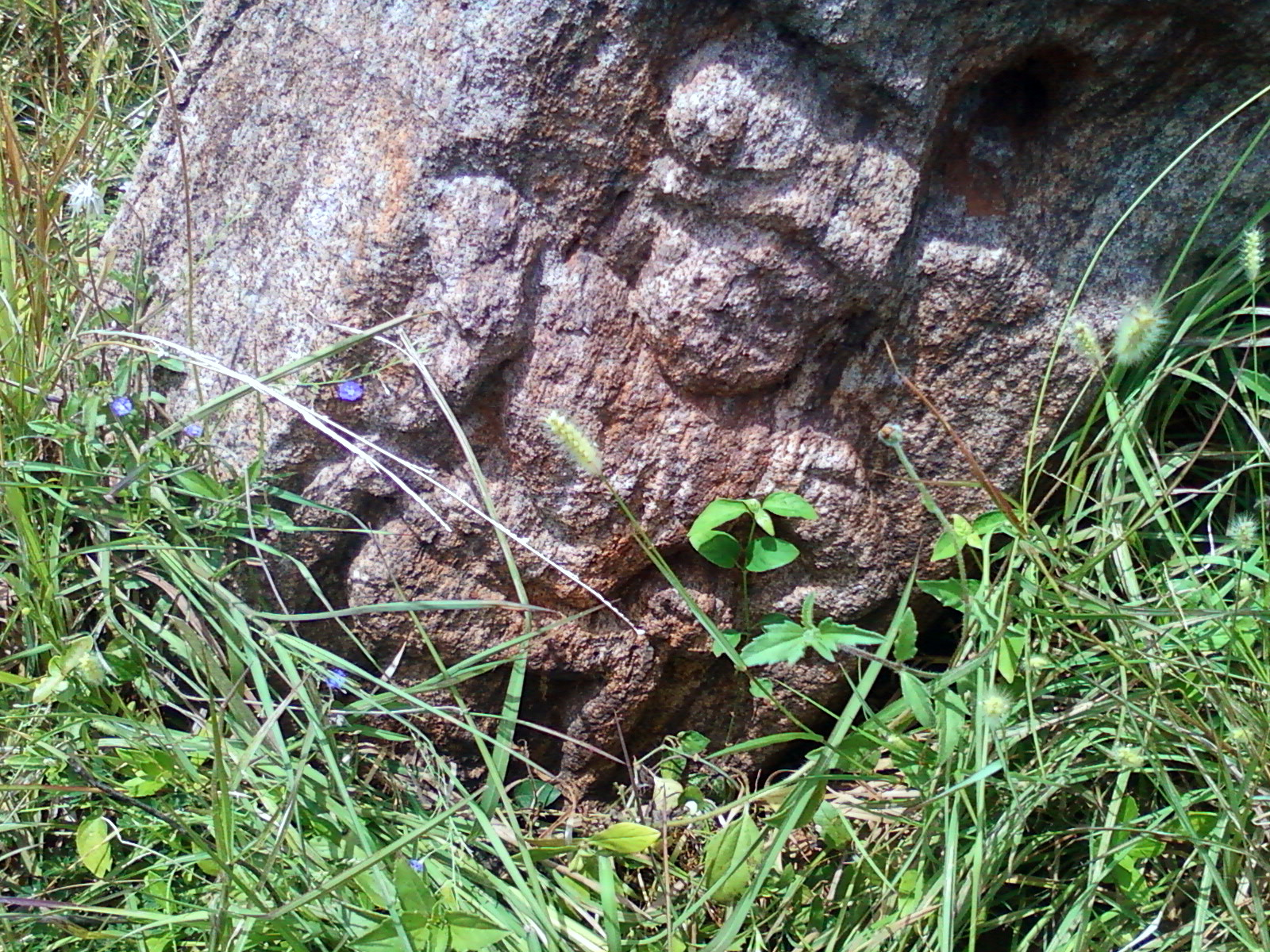
Yaksha Relief at Pavurallakonda near Bheemunipatnam

Pavurallakonda ("pigeon hill") is a hillock west of Bhimli, about 24 km (15 mi) from Visakhapatnam. The Buddhist settlement found here is estimated to date back from the first century BCE to the second century CE. On the hillock (which overlooks the coastline) are 16 rock-cut cisterns for collecting rainwater. Gopalapatnam, on the Tandava River, is a village surrounded by brick stupas, viharas, pottery and other Buddhist artefacts.

==== Sankaram ====
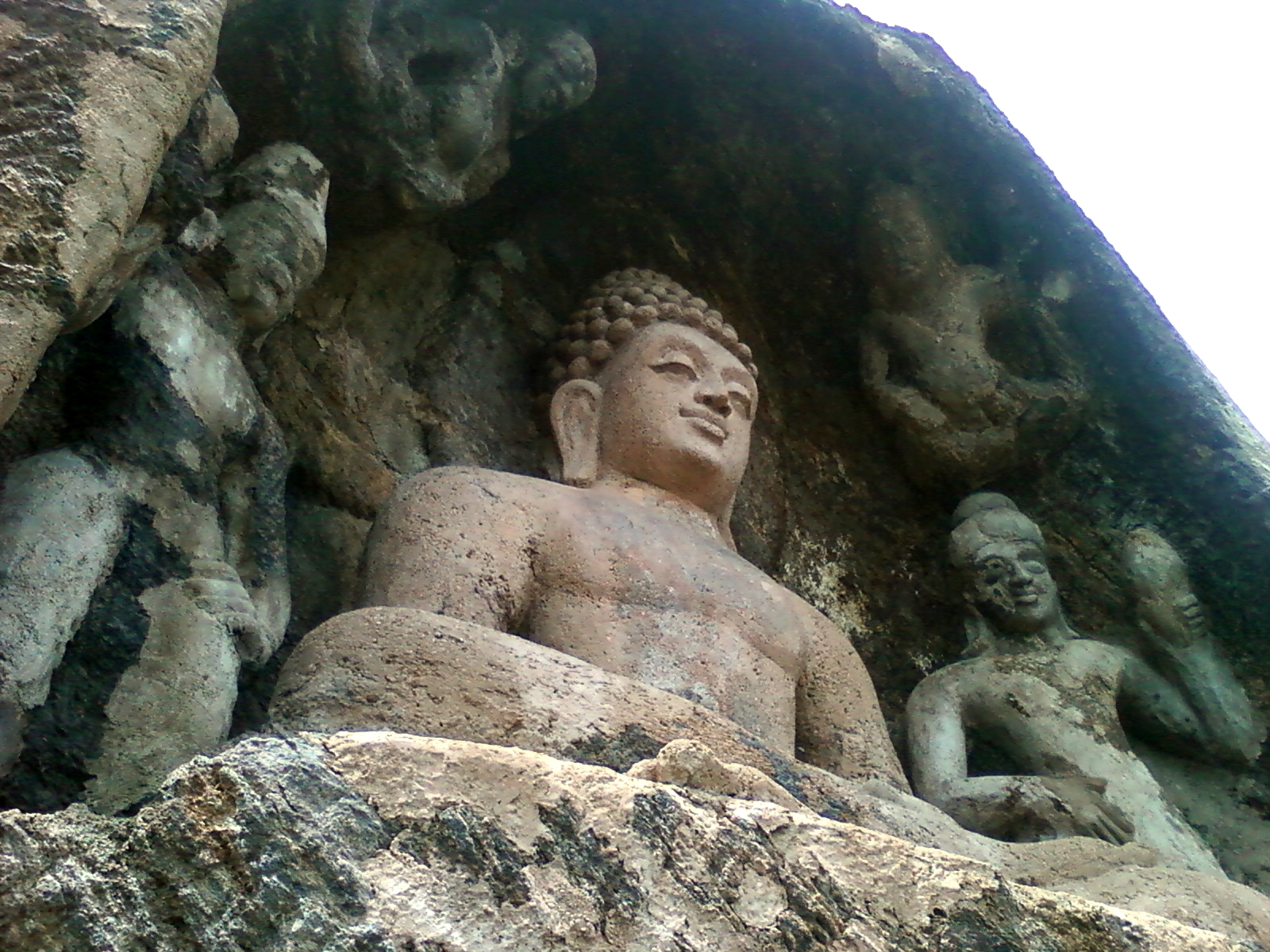
Stone seated Buddha at Bojjannakonda near Anakapalle

In the 1907-08 Annual Report of the Archaeological Survey of India, British archaeologist Alexander Rea provided an initial description of Sankaram, a 2,000-year-old Buddhist site. The name "Śankaram" derives from the Sangharama (temple or monastery). Located 50 km (31 mi) south of Visakhapatnam, it is a significant Buddhist site in Andhra Pradesh. The three major schools of Buddhism (Hinayana, Mahayana and Vajrayana) flourished here. The complex is known for its monolithic stupas, rock-cut caves and brick structures. The primary stupa was initially carved out of rock and covered with bricks. Excavations yielded historic pottery and Satavahana coins from the first century CE. The vihara, a monastery, was active for about 1,000 years.

The complex is set atop two hillocks, known locally as Bojjannakonda and Lingalametta (or Lingalakonda), and also collectively as Bojjankonda. Bojjannakonda has several images of the Buddha carved on the rock face of the caves. At Lingalametta there are more than two hundred rock-cut monolithic stupas in rows spread across the hill. Among other Buddhist attractions are a relic casket, three chaitya halls, votive platforms, stupas and Vajrayana sculptures.

==== Bavikonda ====
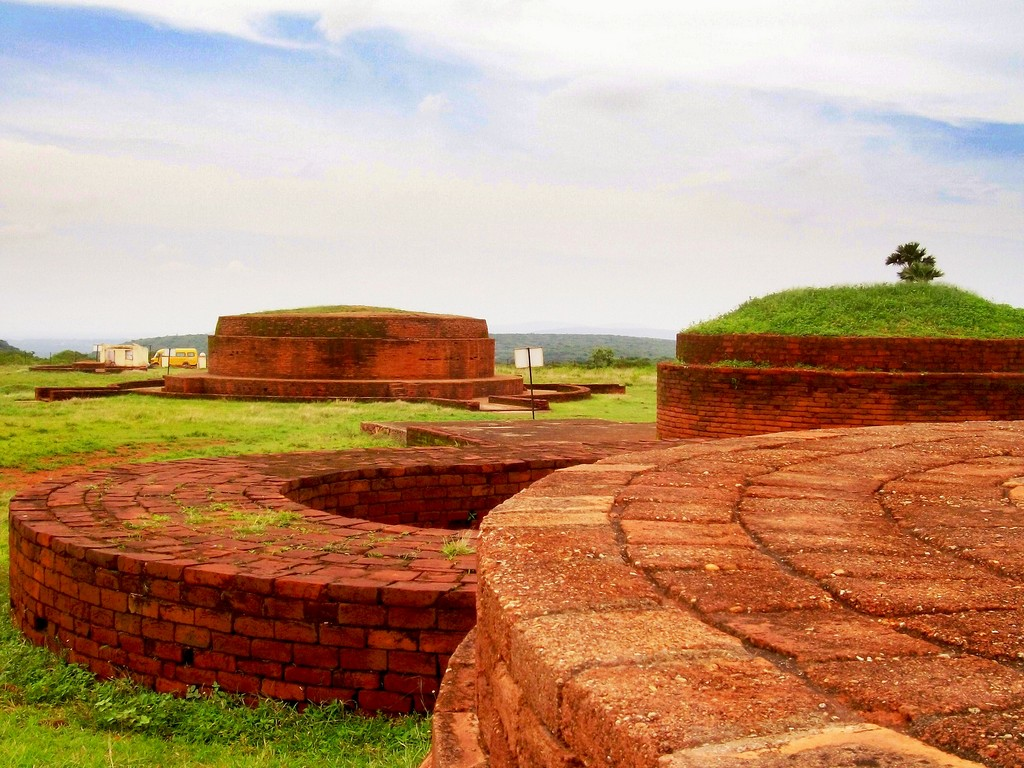
Bavikonda stupas

Bavikonda is an important Buddhist heritage site located on a hill about 15 km (9.3 mi), northeast of Visakhapatnam city. Here the Buddhist habitation is noticed on a 16 ha flat terraced area. The Hinayana school of Buddhism was practised at the monastery between the 3rd century B.C. and the 3rd century A.D. Bavikonda has remains of an entire Buddhist complex, comprising 26 structures belonging to three phases. A piece of bone stored in an urn recovered here is believed to belong to the mortal remains of the Buddha. The word Bavikonda in Telugu means "a hill of wells". Fitting its name, Bavikonda is a hill with wells for the collection of rainwater. It is located 15 km (9.3 mi) from Visakhapatnam and is a significant Buddhist site.

Excavation carried out from 1982 to 1987 revealed a Buddhist establishment including a mahachaitya, also referred to as a grand stupa, embedded with relic caskets, a large Vihara (monastery) complex, numerous votive stupas, a stone-pillared congregation and rectangular halls and a refectory. Artifacts recovered from the site include Roman and Satavahana coins and pottery dating from the third century BCE to the second century CE. A significant finding was a piece of bone (with a large quantity of ash) in an urn, which is believed to be the remains of the Buddha. The Bavikonda site is considered one of the oldest Buddhist sites in Asia. It is a reminder of the Buddhist civilisation which once existed in southern India, and also reminiscent of Borobudur in Indonesia.

==== Thotlakonda ====
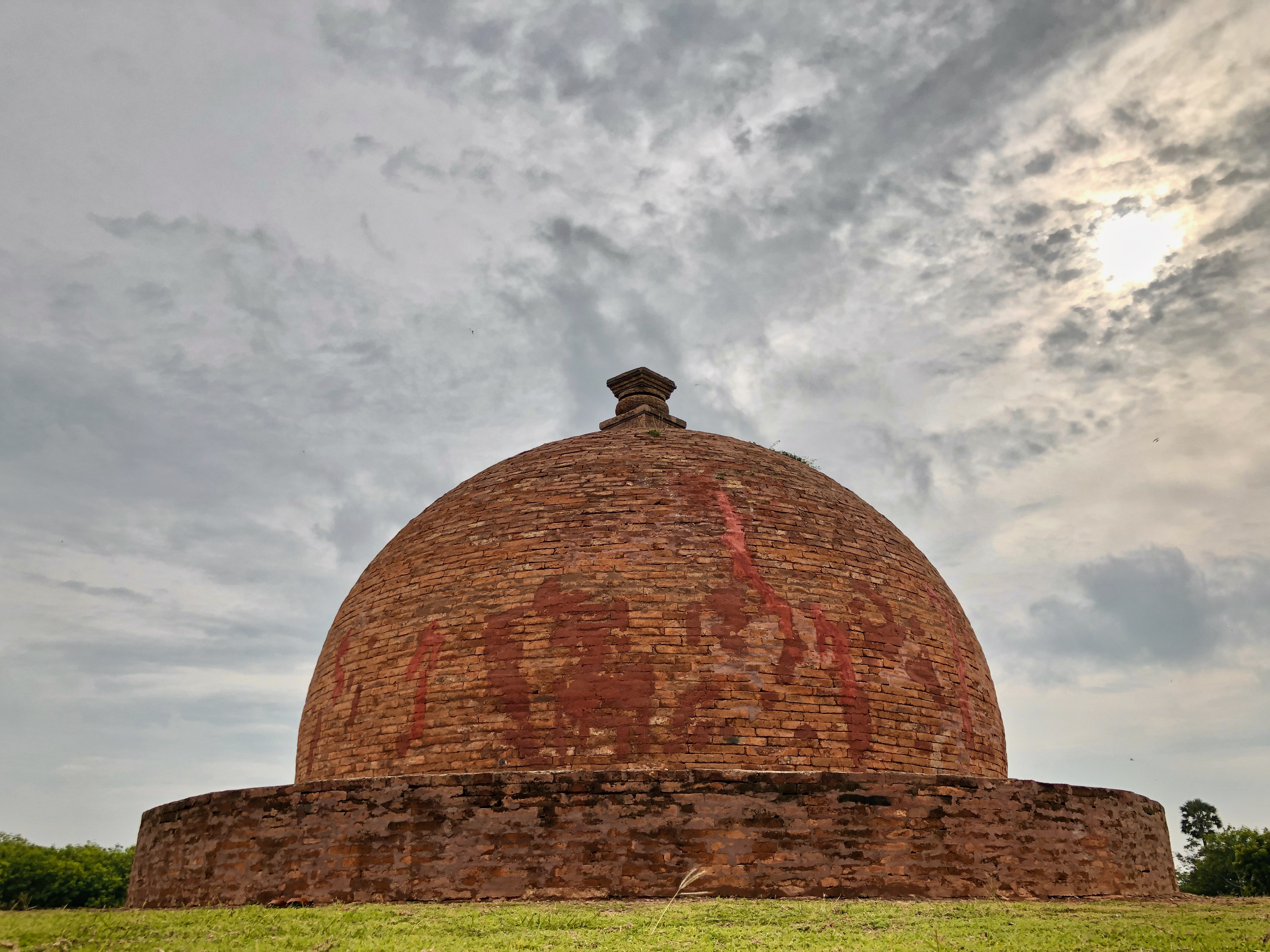
Third-century BCE Buddhist ruins of Totlakonda

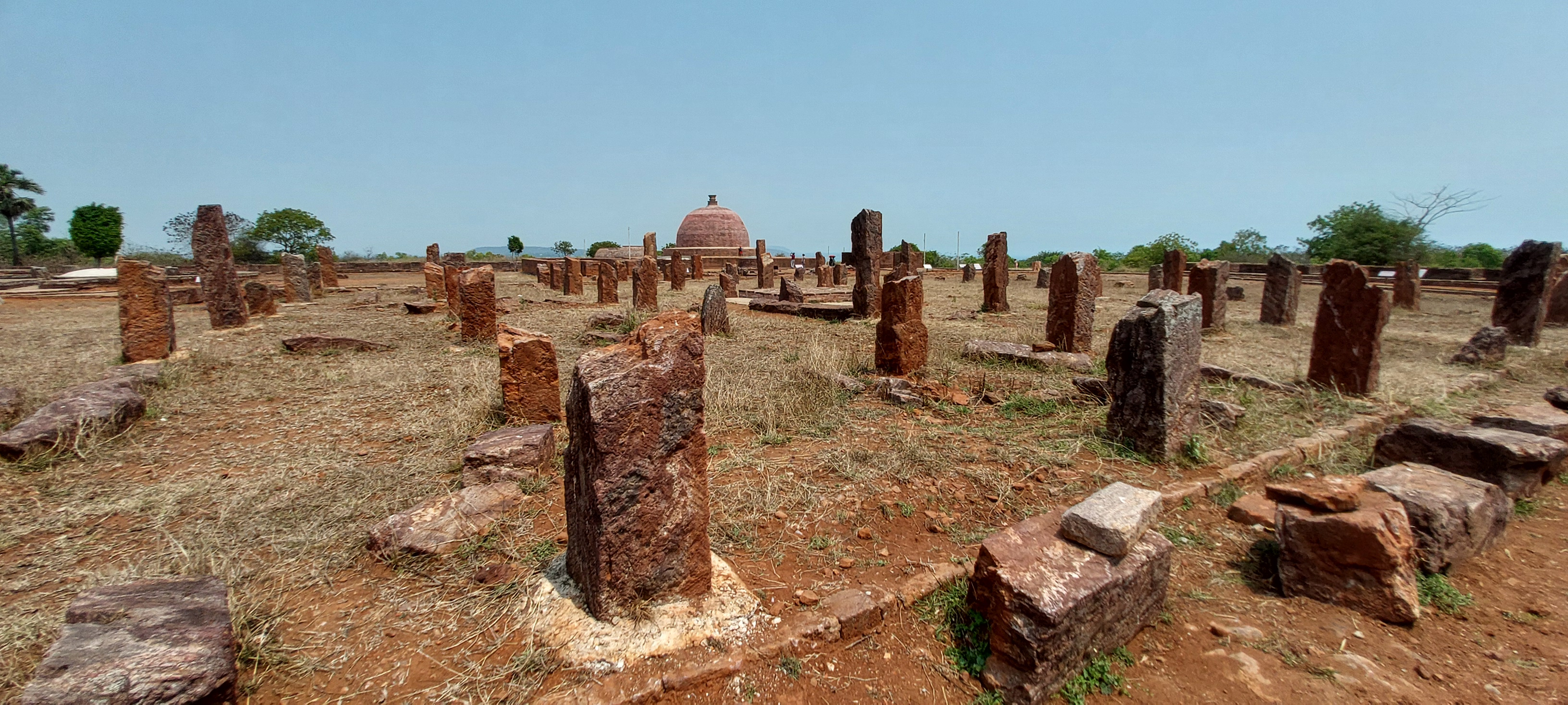
Thotlakonda Buddhist Complex

About 16 km (9.9 mi) from Visakhapatnam is Thotlakonda, a Buddhist complex situated on top of a hill. The Buddhist complex on the Mangamaripeta hilltop, locally known as Totlakonda, lies about 16 km (9.9 mi) from Visakhapatnam on Visakhapatnam-Bheemili Beach Road. After its discovery (during an aerial survey), the Government of Andhra Pradesh declared the 48 ha site as a protected monument in 1978. Excavations from 1988 to 1992 exposed structural remains and artefacts, classified as Religious, Secular, and Civil. These structures include the Stupa, Chaityagrihas, pillared congregation halls, bhandagaras, refectory (bhojanasala), drainage, and stone pathways. The site covers an area of 120 acres (49 hectares), and has been declared a protected area by the government of Andhra Pradesh. Excavations have revealed three kinds of structural remains: religious, secular, and civil. Structures include a mahastupa, 16 votive stupas, a stone-pillared congregation hall, eleven rock-cut cisterns, well-paved stone pathways, an apsidal chaitya-griha, three round chaitgya-grihas, two votive platforms, ten viharas and a kitchen complex with three halls and a refectory (dining hall). Apart from the structures, Buddhist treasures excavated include nine Satavahana and five Roman silver coins, terracotta tiles, stucco decorative pieces, sculptured panels, miniature stupa models in stone, Buddha padas depicted with ashtamangala symbols (i.e. the eight auspicious symbols of Swastika, Shrivasta, Nandhyavarta, Vardhamanaka, Bhadrasana, Kalasha, Minyugala and Darpan) and early pottery.

=== Later history ===
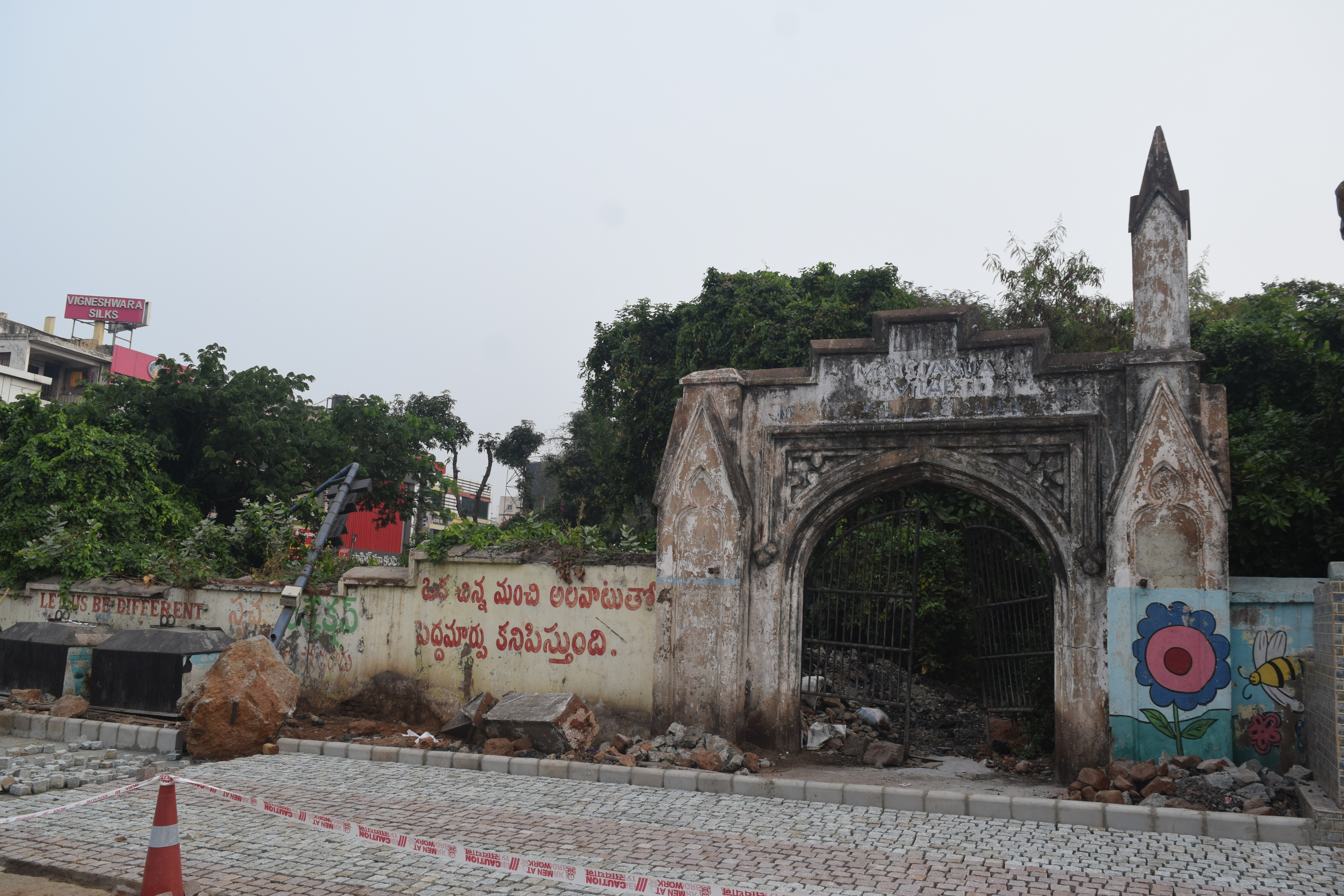
Mor Sjanua Regimental Cemetery near Jagadamba junction

The territory of Visakhapatnam then came under the Andhra rulers of Vengi, and Chalukyas and Pallavas ruled the land. The region was ruled by the Eastern Ganga king and the Gajapati kings from the 10th century to the 16th century CE. Based on archaeological evidence, the Prabhakar and the Eastern Ganga Kings built temples in the city in the 11th and 12th centuries. In the late 16th century, it came under the direct rule of the Suryavanshi king, Maharaja Vishwanath Dev Gajapati of Jeypore. However, from 1571 to 1674 it fell under the control and administration of the Qutb Shahi kings of Golconda who appointed a governor or Faujdar to collect taxes in the region. This Faujdar governed the area from Srikakulam or Chicacole as it was then known. In 1674, the Maharaja of Jeypore, Vishwambhar Dev defeated the Foujdar and claimed sovereignty from the deteriorating Qutb Shahis. Vishwambhar is also said to have defeated the Dutch East India Company who allegedly abducted locals, mostly fishermen living by the sea-shore. Later his descendant, Maharaja Raghunath Krishna Dev defeated the Seer Lascer appointed by the Mughals and maintained his rule over the region. Therefore, Visakhapatnam remained a part of the Kingdom of Jeypore until the death of Maharaja Ram Chandra Dev I in 1711 after which it was taken over by the Nizam of Hyderabad who could only govern it for a few decades before transferring it to the British. Even in the colonial era, the kings of Jeypore were referred to as the Maharaja or Raja of Vizagapatnam. European merchants from France, Holland and the East India Company used the natural port to export tobacco, paddy, coal, iron ore, ivory, muslin and other textile products. The British developed Visakhapatnam as a prominent harbour on the east coast. The old port in Jalari Peta was built and used by the Maharaja of Jeypore who also owned several ships. During the First World War, Maharaja Vikram Dev III sent his fleet of ships to aid the British and later donated the port to the British government of Madras. It is now a fish market.

Local legend tells that an Andhra king, on his way to Benares, rested at Visakhapatnam and was so enchanted by its beauty that he ordered a temple to be built in honour of his family deity, Viśakha. Archaeological sources, however, reveal that the temple was probably built between the 11th and 12th centuries by the Cholas. A shipping merchant, Sankarayya Chetty, built one of the mandapams (pillared halls) of the temple. Although it no longer exists (possibly washed away about 100 years ago by a cyclonic storm), elderly residents of Visakhapatnam remember visits to the ancient shrine by their grandparents (although author Ganapatiraju Atchuta Rama Raju denies this).

During the 18th century Visakhapatnam was part of the Northern Circars, a region comprising coastal Andhra and southern coastal Odisha which was first under French control and later British. Visakhapatnam became a district in the Madras Presidency of British India. In September 1804, British and French squadrons fought the Battle of Vizagapatam near the harbour. After India's independence, it was the largest district in the country and was subsequently divided into the districts of Srikakulam, Vizianagaram and Visakhapatnam.

Part of the city is known by its colonial British name, Waltair; during the colonial era, the city's hub was the Waltair railway station and a part of the city is still called Waltair.

On 7 May 2020, the city suffered an industrial accident when a polymer plant leaked toxic styrene gas, as it restarted operations after the Coronavirus lockdown. This gas leak killed at least eleven people, and drew comparisons to the Bhopal disaster.

== Geography ==
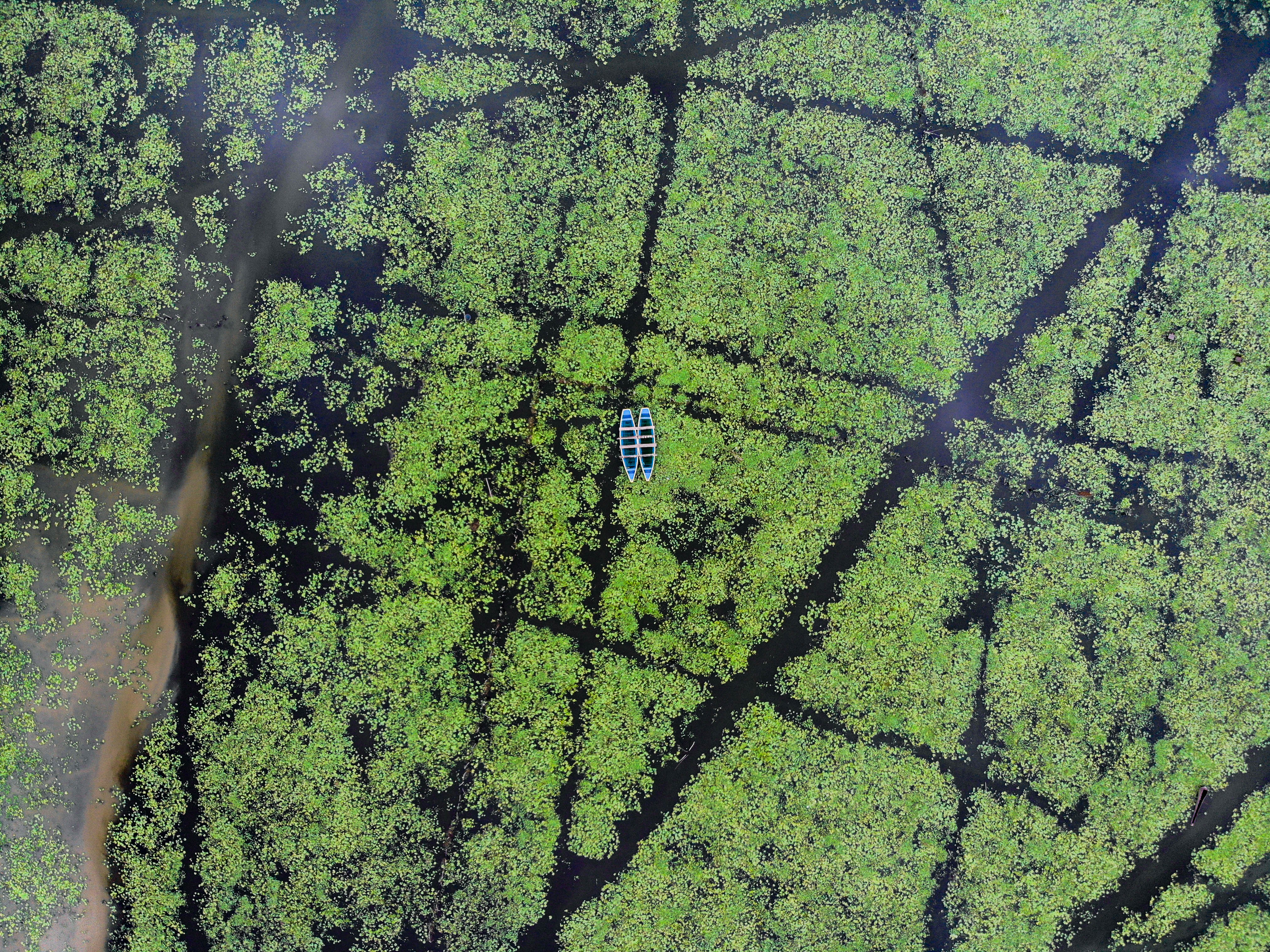
Kondakarla Ava, a bird sanctuary near Visakhapatnam

The city is situated between the Eastern Ghats and the Bay of Bengal. The city's area is 682 km^{2}. The average elevation is 45 metres. Visakhapatnam is situated in Coastal Andhra Region.

The city is surrounded by the Simhachalam Hill Range to the west, the Yarada Hills to the southeast, and Kambalakonda Wildlife Sanctuary to the northwest. The hills play an important role in Visakhapatnam's ecological environment and cover over 621.52 km^{2}.

=== Hills in Visakhapatnam ===
- Eastern Ghats
- Simhachalam Hills
- Yarada Hills
- Erra Matti Dibbalu
- Dolphin's Nose Hills
- Kailasagiri Hills

=== Climate ===
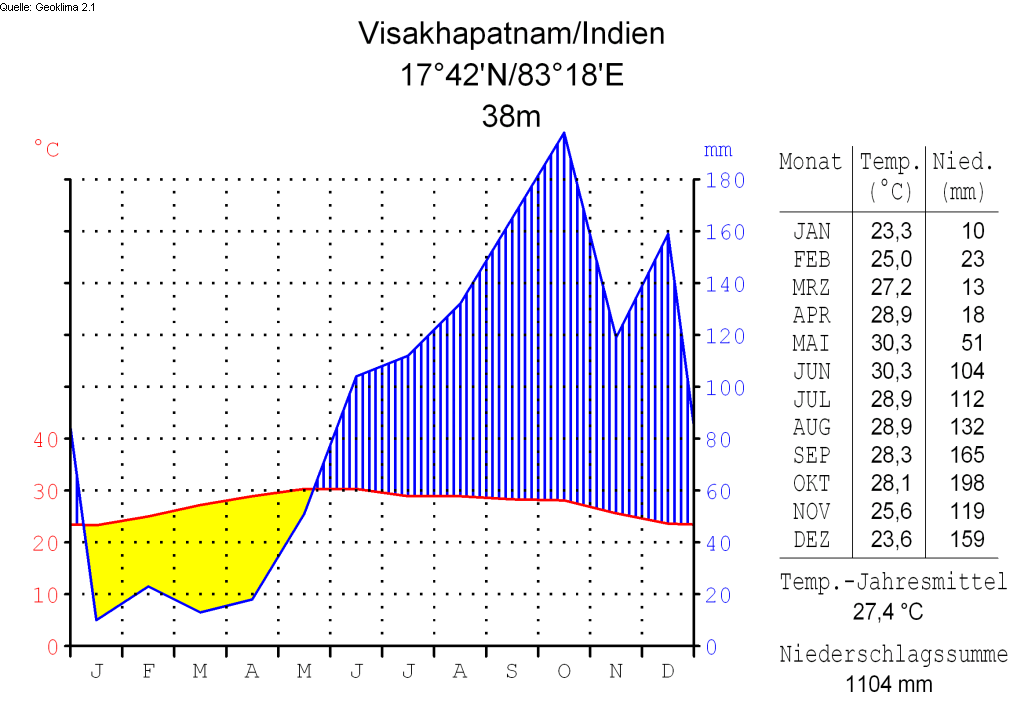
The average temperature of visakhapatnam

Visakhapatnam has a tropical savanna climate (Köppen: Aw, closely bordering As). The annual mean temperatures range between 24.7–30.6 °C (76–87 °F), with the maximum in May and the minimum in January; the minimum temperatures ranges between 17–27 °C (63–81 °F). The highest maximum temperature ever recorded was 42.0 °C (107.6 °F) in 1978, and the lowest was 10.5 °C (51 °F) on 6 January 1962. It receives rainfall from the South-west and North-east monsoons and the average annual rainfall recorded is 1,118.8 mm (44.05 in). In October 2014 Cyclone Hudhud made landfall near Visakhapatnam.

Climate data for Visakhapatnam (1991–2020)
Month	Jan	Feb	Mar	Apr	May	Jun	Jul	Aug	Sep	Oct	Nov	Dec	Year
Record high °C (°F)	32.1 (89.8)	34.0 (93.2)	36.6 (97.9)	36.5 (97.7)	42.0 (107.6)	41.0 (105.8)	39.9 (103.8)	37.4 (99.3)	37.5 (99.5)	35.9 (96.6)	34.9 (94.8)	33.2 (91.8)	42.0 (107.6)
Mean daily maximum °C (°F)	28.1 (82.6)	29.6 (85.3)	31.2 (88.2)	32.1 (89.8)	33.3 (91.9)	32.8 (91.0)	31.4 (88.5)	31.5 (88.7)	31.6 (88.9)	31.5 (88.7)	30.3 (86.5)	28.7 (83.7)	31.0 (87.8)
Mean daily minimum °C (°F)	20.5 (68.9)	22.1 (71.8)	24.6 (76.3)	26.5 (79.7)	27.8 (82.0)	27.4 (81.3)	26.4 (79.5)	26.2 (79.2)	26.0 (78.8)	25.2 (77.4)	23.2 (73.8)	21.0 (69.8)	24.7 (76.5)
Record low °C (°F)	14.8 (58.6)	17.5 (63.5)	19.4 (66.9)	19.5 (67.1)	21.0 (69.8)	21.4 (70.5)	21.0 (69.8)	20.2 (68.4)	21.3 (70.3)	20.4 (68.7)	17.6 (63.7)	16.0 (60.8)	14.8 (58.6)
Average rainfall mm (inches)	10.8 (0.43)	8.9 (0.35)	8.9 (0.35)	28.4 (1.12)	73.6 (2.90)	134.5 (5.30)	133.0 (5.24)	165.3 (6.51)	194.9 (7.67)	239.9 (9.44)	101.7 (4.00)	13.2 (0.52)	1,113.1 (43.82)
Average rainy days	0.6	0.8	0.7	1.4	3.3	6.5	8.5	9.2	10.3	8.4	3.1	0.9	53.7
Average relative humidity (%) (at 17:30 IST)	69	70	74	76	76	76	77	78	80	74	68	65	74
Source: India Meteorological Department

Climate data for Visakhapatnam Airport (1991–2020, extremes 1901–present)
Month	Jan	Feb	Mar	Apr	May	Jun	Jul	Aug	Sep	Oct	Nov	Dec	Year
Record high °C (°F)	34.8 (94.6)	38.4 (101.1)	41.0 (105.8)	40.6 (105.1)	45.0 (113.0)	45.4 (113.7)	41.4 (106.5)	38.8 (101.8)	38.2 (100.8)	37.2 (99.0)	35.0 (95.0)	34.0 (93.2)	45.4 (113.7)
Mean daily maximum °C (°F)	29.7 (85.5)	31.9 (89.4)	34.6 (94.3)	35.7 (96.3)	36.7 (98.1)	35.4 (95.7)	33.6 (92.5)	33.2 (91.8)	33.2 (91.8)	32.6 (90.7)	31.1 (88.0)	29.9 (85.8)	33.1 (91.6)
Daily mean °C (°F)	24.5 (76.1)	25.8 (78.4)	28.0 (82.4)	29.4 (84.9)	30.7 (87.3)	30.2 (86.4)	29.0 (84.2)	29.0 (84.2)	28.9 (84.0)	28.5 (83.3)	27.0 (80.6)	25.1 (77.2)	28.0 (82.4)
Mean daily minimum °C (°F)	18.3 (64.9)	20.4 (68.7)	23.7 (74.7)	26.3 (79.3)	28.0 (82.4)	27.8 (82.0)	26.8 (80.2)	26.5 (79.7)	26.1 (79.0)	25.1 (77.2)	22.0 (71.6)	18.7 (65.7)	24.1 (75.4)
Record low °C (°F)	10.5 (50.9)	12.8 (55.0)	14.4 (57.9)	18.3 (64.9)	20.0 (68.0)	21.1 (70.0)	21.3 (70.3)	21.1 (70.0)	17.5 (63.5)	17.6 (63.7)	12.9 (55.2)	11.3 (52.3)	10.5 (50.9)
Average rainfall mm (inches)	8.3 (0.33)	9.5 (0.37)	6.6 (0.26)	24.7 (0.97)	67.3 (2.65)	131.1 (5.16)	121.6 (4.79)	148.6 (5.85)	207.9 (8.19)	232.2 (9.14)	87.5 (3.44)	9.3 (0.37)	1,054.5 (41.52)
Average rainy days	0.8	0.9	0.6	1.5	3.4	6.5	8.0	8.3	10.6	8.4	3.0	0.7	52.6
Average relative humidity (%) (at 17:30 IST)	64	61	62	66	66	68	71	73	76	73	67	62	67
Mean monthly sunshine hours	272.8	271.2	272.8	264.0	251.1	135.0	130.2	133.3	168.0	229.4	228.0	269.7	2,625.5
Mean daily sunshine hours	8.8	9.6	8.8	8.8	8.1	4.5	4.2	4.3	5.6	7.4	7.6	8.7	7.2
Average ultraviolet index	9	11	12	12	12	12	12	12	12	10	9	8	11
Source 1: India Meteorological Department (sun 1971–2000)
Source 2: Tokyo Climate Center (mean temperatures 1991–2020) Weather Atlas

Climate data for Visakhapatnam (Dolphin's Nose) 1981–2010, extremes 1970–2005)
Month	Jan	Feb	Mar	Apr	May	Jun	Jul	Aug	Sep	Oct	Nov	Dec	Year
Record high °C (°F)	30.7 (87.3)	35.0 (95.0)	36.2 (97.2)	36.1 (97.0)	42.8 (109.0)	39.8 (103.6)	39.8 (103.6)	36.2 (97.2)	36.6 (97.9)	34.5 (94.1)	32.4 (90.3)	31.4 (88.5)	42.8 (109.0)
Mean daily maximum °C (°F)	27.2 (81.0)	26.9 (80.4)	30.6 (87.1)	31.5 (88.7)	32.6 (90.7)	32.2 (90.0)	30.6 (87.1)	30.5 (86.9)	30.6 (87.1)	30.2 (86.4)	28.8 (83.8)	27.4 (81.3)	30.1 (86.2)
Mean daily minimum °C (°F)	19.8 (67.6)	21.4 (70.5)	23.5 (74.3)	25.0 (77.0)	26.1 (79.0)	26.0 (78.8)	25.0 (77.0)	24.8 (76.6)	24.8 (76.6)	23.8 (74.8)	21.8 (71.2)	19.8 (67.6)	23.5 (74.3)
Record low °C (°F)	15.6 (60.1)	17.7 (63.9)	17.4 (63.3)	17.9 (64.2)	18.5 (65.3)	18.4 (65.1)	18.4 (65.1)	19.6 (67.3)	18.8 (65.8)	19.4 (66.9)	16.3 (61.3)	14.1 (57.4)	14.1 (57.4)
Average rainfall mm (inches)	14.3 (0.56)	28.9 (1.14)	14.6 (0.57)	25.0 (0.98)	66.0 (2.60)	107.5 (4.23)	131.8 (5.19)	132.6 (5.22)	161.6 (6.36)	270.4 (10.65)	105.1 (4.14)	3.5 (0.14)	1,061.2 (41.78)
Average rainy days	1.0	1.1	0.4	1.4	3.4	5.4	7.8	7.4	8.5	8.3	4.0	0.7	49.3
Average relative humidity (%) (at 8:30 IST)	78	76	75	78	77	79	83	83	82	79	73	72	76
Source: India Meteorological Department

Vishakhapatnam has been ranked 22nd best "National Clean Air City" (under Category 1 >10L Population cities) in India.

== Demographics ==
Population of Vizag (by gender)
1. Male 873,599 (50.6%)
2. Female 854,529 (49.4%)

As of 2011 census of India, Visakhapatnam had a population of 1,728,128, of which males were 873,599 and females were 854,529 – a sex ratio of 978 females per 1000 males. The population density was 18,480/km^{2} (47,900/sq mi). There were 164,129 children in the age group of 0–6 years, with 84,298 boys and 79,831 girls – a sex ratio was 947 girls per 1000 boys. The average literacy rate stood at 81.79% with a total of 1,279,137 literates, of which 688,678 were males and 590,459 were females. It is ranked 122 in the list of fastest-growing cities in the world. The total slum population covers 44.61% of the total population which implies 770,971 people reside in slums.

The recent estimates of city's population are 2,358,412 in 2022.

=== Language and religion ===
Languages of Visakhapatnam (2011)
1. Telugu (92.1%)
2. Urdu (2.77%)
3. Hindi (2.19%)
4. Odia (0.92%)
5. Others (1.99%)

Telugu is the official and the most predominantly spoken language by native speakers. Two dialects of Telugu are spoken by the people, the common dialect and the Uttarandhra (North Eastern Andhra) dialect. The latter is mainly spoken by the people who originally belong to the districts of Vizianagaram and Srikakulam. A cosmopolitan population of Visakhapatnam comprises Tamils, Malayalis, Sindhis, Kannadigas, Odias, Bengalis and Bihari migrants from other regions of India. There is also an Anglo-Indian community, regarded as the first cosmopolitans of the city.

According to the 2011 census, Telugu is the most spoken language in the city, with 92.13% speakers, followed by Urdu (2.77%), Hindi (2.19%), Odia (0.92%).

Religion in Visakhapatnam (2011)
Hinduism	92.32%
Islam	3.85%
Christianity	3.07%
Other or not stated	0.76%

Hinduism is practised by the majority of its citizens, followed by Islam and Christianity. The area practised Buddhism in the ancient past, as evidenced by the many Buddhist sangharamas in the outlying areas but the population of Buddhists has waned, with approximately 0.03% population in the entire city based on the recent census.

== Administration ==
Greater Visakhapatnam Municipal Corporation

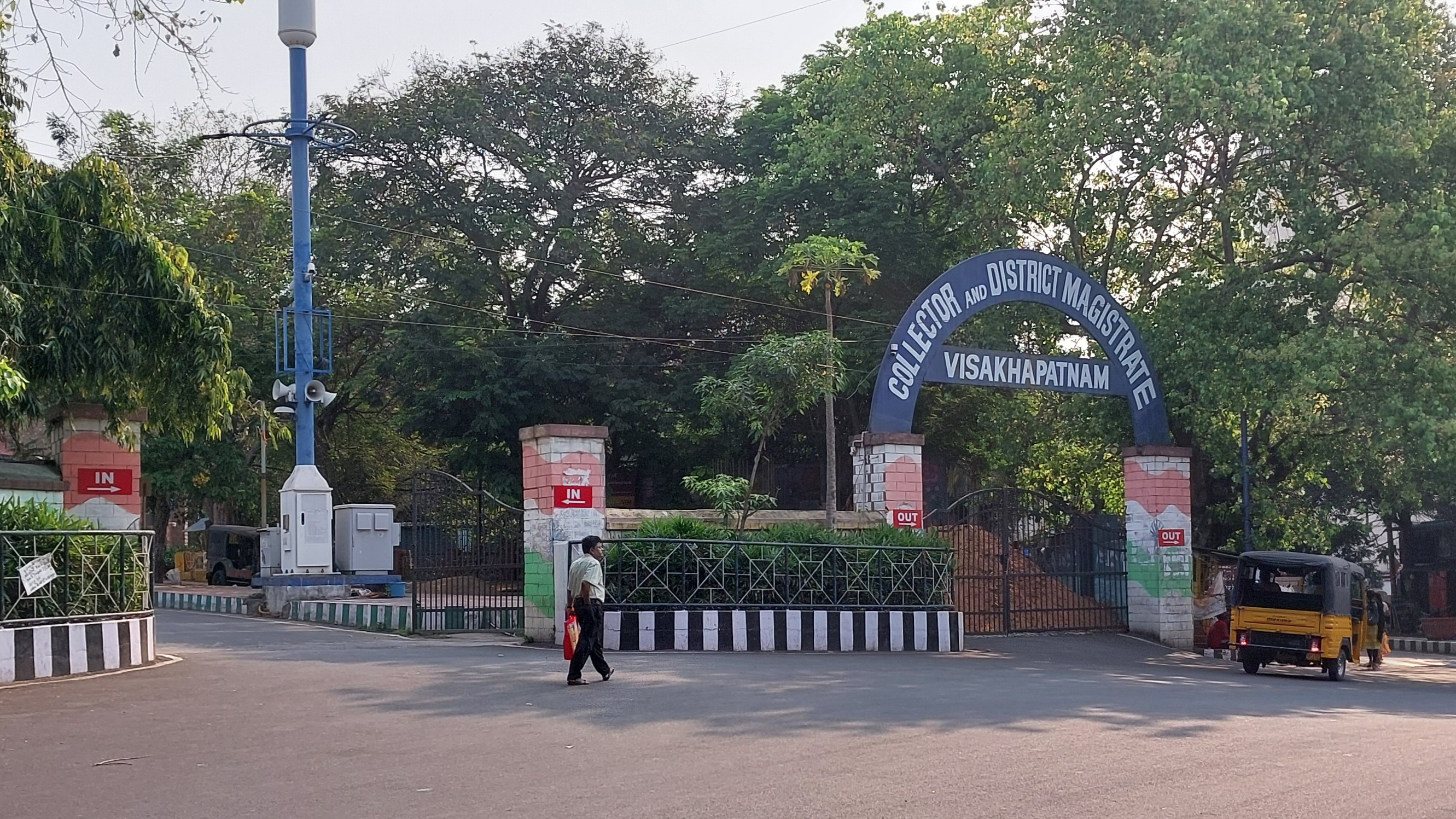
Collectorate Building, Visakhapatnam

Greater Visakhapatnam Municipal Corporation (GVMC) is the civic body that oversees the civic needs of the city. One of the earliest municipalities in this area, the Vizag (Visakhapatnam) Municipality was set up in 1858 to fulfill the basic infrastructural needs of the people. It was converted into a municipal corporation in 1979. Greater Visakhapatnam Municipal Corporation came into existence on 21 November 2005 after the release of G.O by Govt of Andhra Pradesh.

As per the Ministry of Housing and Urban Affairs, the Greater Visakhapatnam Municipal Corporation reported a revenue of ₹1,031 crore (US$124 million) and an expenditure of ₹867 crore (US$104 million) in 2022–23. Taxes contributed to 40.8% of the revenue, with 59.2% of the income coming from other sources.

It has a jurisdictional area of 681.96 km^{2} (263.31 sq mi), which includes the merged municipalities of Gajuwaka, Anakapalle and Bheemunipatnam. Although as per the 2011 census, it is 513.61 km^{2} (198.31 sq mi) mentioned in the district town amenities handbook of Andhra Pradesh, portraying a rise in area covered by the municipal corporation in these years

The municipal corporation of Vishakapatnam is governed by three acts. First is the State Municipal Act, the Andhra Pradesh Municipalities Act 1965, the Andhra Pradesh Municipal Corporations 1994 Act, as well as an act specific to the Vishakapatnam Municipal Corporation Act 1979.

The city is divided into 9 zones, In a recent agglomeration of five Bheemili villages with a population of 19,000 into the GVMC jurisdiction the number of wards has increased to 98.

=== Municipal elections and civic government officials ===
The previous Municipal Elections were held in 2007. After a larger gap of 13 years, the elections were scheduled to happen on 23 March 2020. The results of the latest municipal elections for 145 municipalities and 10 municipal corporations across Andhra Pradesh were held on 30 March and the results were announced on Monday. Of the 92 municipalities in Seemandhra, TDP won 65 municipalities and YSR Congress 19. Of the seven municipal corporations, TDP bagged five and YSR Congress two.

The City governance structure of GVMC consists of an elected wing headed by the Mayor an administrative wing headed by the Administrative Commissioner, four Additional commissioners, and eight zonal commissioners. Mayor elections were planned to be carried out in March 2020 but details are yet to be declared. The present municipal commissioner of the city is G Srijana. The municipal commissioner looks after the administration of the municipal corporation.

The executive wing has departments for Engineering, Public health, revenue, town planning, horticulture, education, finance, general administration, projects, IT E-governance and Urban Community Development.

The organisational structure of the GVMC includes standing committees, ward committees and special committees, The corporation wards committees must be of not less than ten wards, special committees are appointed by the corporation out of their own body, and a standing committee consisting of chairpersons from all wards.

=== Municipal budget ===
The GVMC estimated a budget of ₹4,171 crore (equivalent to ₹54 billion or US$560 million in 2026) for the financial year 2020–21. It shows an increase of ₹337 crore (equivalent to ₹457 crore or US$47 million in 2026) compared to the last budget for 2019–20. The Revenue Department of GVMC generates its revenue by levying of Property Tax, Vacant Land Tax and it is the collection and dealing with Remunerative Enterprises, Water Charges, etc.

=== Masterplan ===
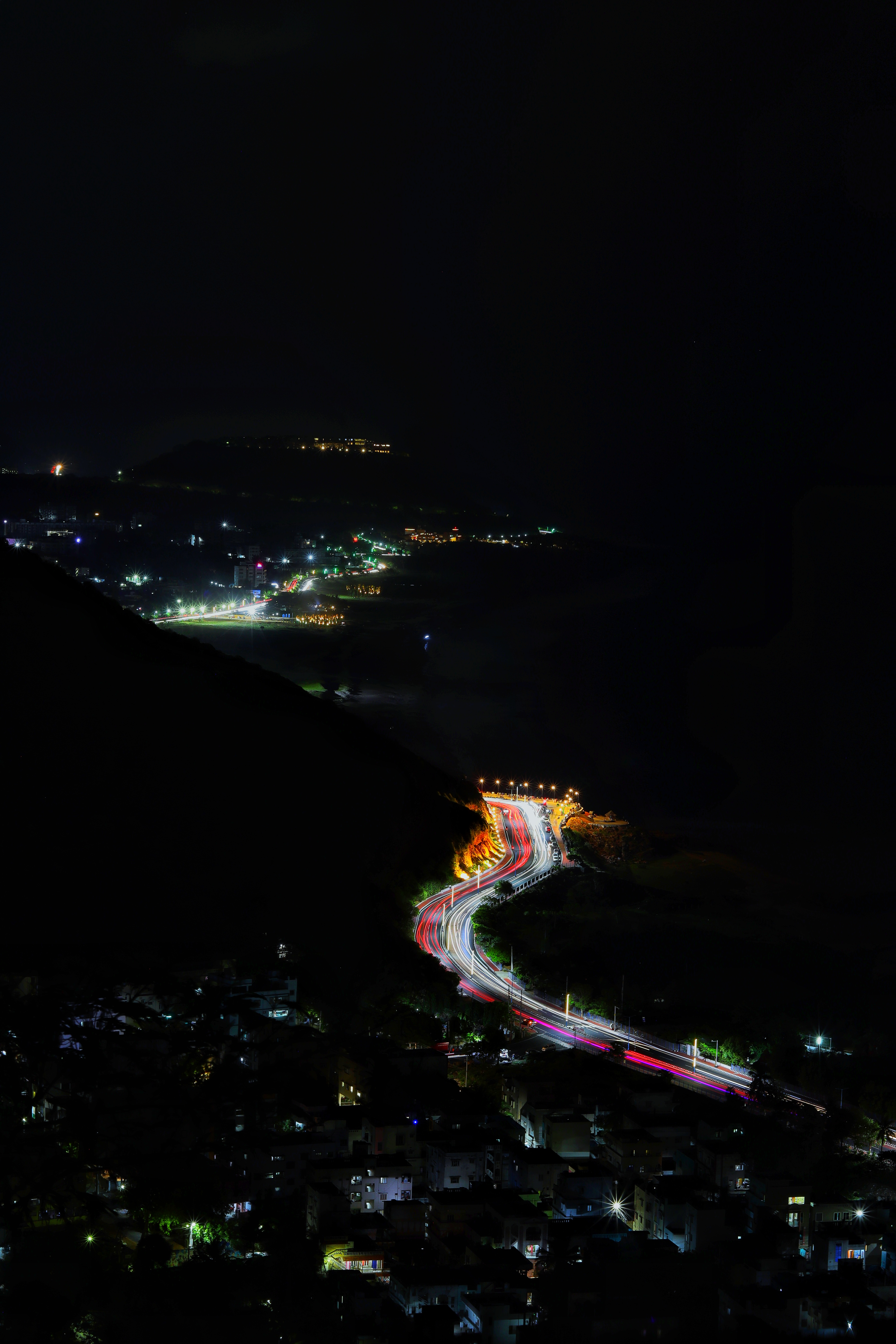
Beach road along the Kailasagiri hill illuminated with Automobile trails at night

In 2019, the Planning wing of the Visakhapatnam Metropolitan Region Development Authority (VMRDA) started preparing a 'perspective plan 2051' which is a 30-year strategic plan, apart from another 'master plan 2041'. The 'perspective plan' is expected to include provisions for resource conservation, regional growth, economic growth and transportation strategies, coastal zone regulations, disaster management strategies, population forecast and distribution, a broad structure plan, and an implementation plan.

The 'master plan' proposes a growth strategy with transit-oriented development strategies, expansion of satellite towns such as Vizianagaram, Anakapalli, Bheemili, etc., theme-based economic nodes along the proposed metro-rail corridor, bus-based public transport, tourism destination development, a comprehensive rural agenda and resilient city planning.

Yet another proposal includes a transit corridor connecting Bhogapuram Airport with the existing business centres of the city and the industrial clusters in Atchutapuram under the Visakhapatnam-Chennai Industrial Corridor.

=== District Administration ===
The district area is 11,161 km^{2} (4,309 sq mi). The Sub-Division is divided into Mandals. Visakhapatnam District Consists of 43 mandals, each headed by a Tahsildar. It also has one Municipal Corporation and two Municipalities. There are four revenue divisions in the district. A Revenue division is headed by Revenue Divisional Officer in the rank of Sub–Collector in the cadre of I.A.S. or a Deputy Collector. He is the Sub Divisional Magistrate having jurisdiction over his division.

=== Law and order ===
Law and order in the city are dealt by Visakhapatnam City Police, equipped with a Police Commissionerate with the Commissioner of Police as the head and with assisted by three deputy commissioners for different zones. The current City Police Commissioner is Mr. Manish Kumar Sinha. Visakhapatnam Metropolitan Region Development Authority (VMRDA) is an urban planning agency that covers the GVMC and its suburbs covering, two corporations, one municipality, one nagar panchayat and 895 villages from two districts of Visakhapatnam and Vizianagaram. The expanded area of the city, Visakhapatnam Metropolitan Region extends to 4,873 km^{2} (1,881 sq mi) with a population of 50,18,000 (Western: 5,018,000) and is under the administration of Visakhapatnam Metropolitan Region Development Authority.

The District & Sessions Court is located in Vishakapatnam City and it also includes family courts.

=== Legislative Assembly and Parliament ===
The city has eight legislative assembly constituencies within its limits. In the legislative elections Ganta Srinivasa Rao was elected to the assembly from Bheemili Assembly constituency. Vamsi Krishna Srinivas was elected from Visakhapatnam South. For Visakhapatnam East, Velagapudi Ramakrishna Babu was elected. For Visakhapatnam North Penmetsa Vishnu Kumar Raju and for Visakhapatnam West P. G. V. R. Naidu was elected. For the Gajuwaka Assembly, Palla Srinivasa Rao and for the Pendurthi Assembly Panchakarla Ramesh Babu were elected. For the Anakapalle constituency Konathala Ramakrishna was elected. Out of the eight constituencies Anakapalli and Pendurthi fall under the Anakapalli Lok Sabha Constituency, whose Member of Parliament is C. M. Ramesh. The current Lok Sabha Member of Parliament Vishakhapatnam is Mathukumilli Bharat.

== Civic utilities ==
The Andhra Pradesh Eastern Power Distribution Company Limited (APEPDCL) supplies power to the city of Visakhapatnam. The fire services in the city is carried out by the state fire department, the Andhra Pradesh State Disaster Response and Fire Department, Eastern region (AP Fire).

The city water supply is essentially stored in the three service reservoirs – Town Service Reservoir, Dwarakanagar; High-Level Service Reservoir, T.B. Road, Uplands and Circuit House Reservoir, Waltair Uplands. The city is divided into 14 blocks according to contours and each block is served by separate reservoirs. 35 reservoirs are serving the different segments of the system. Domestic water supply is mainly through public taps and house service connections.

There are about 2072 bore wells as groundwater sources. As per a report from 2015, "GVMC relies mostly on surface water for its raw water supply and serves 54.9 per cent of the city through household-level piped connections. There is a supply gap of almost 66 million litres per day (MLD)

As of 2019, only 50 per cent of the city has access to underground drainage. This is after the city grew over the last decade and Bheemili and Anakapalli among other peripheral villages came under the GVMC's jurisdiction. The GVMC has taken up a project to extend the underground drainage network with a budget of ₹10 crore (equivalent to ₹14 crore or US$1.4 million in 2026). The new project will provide underground drainage access to an estimated 8,000 households. The network will be built under the command area of pumping stations at Venkata Puram and Vimannagar and its vicinity.

In the year 2015, the municipal corporation generated 920 tons of waste per day. Waste generated from all the wards has been disposed of at the dumpsite in Kapuluppada since 2007.

== Economy ==
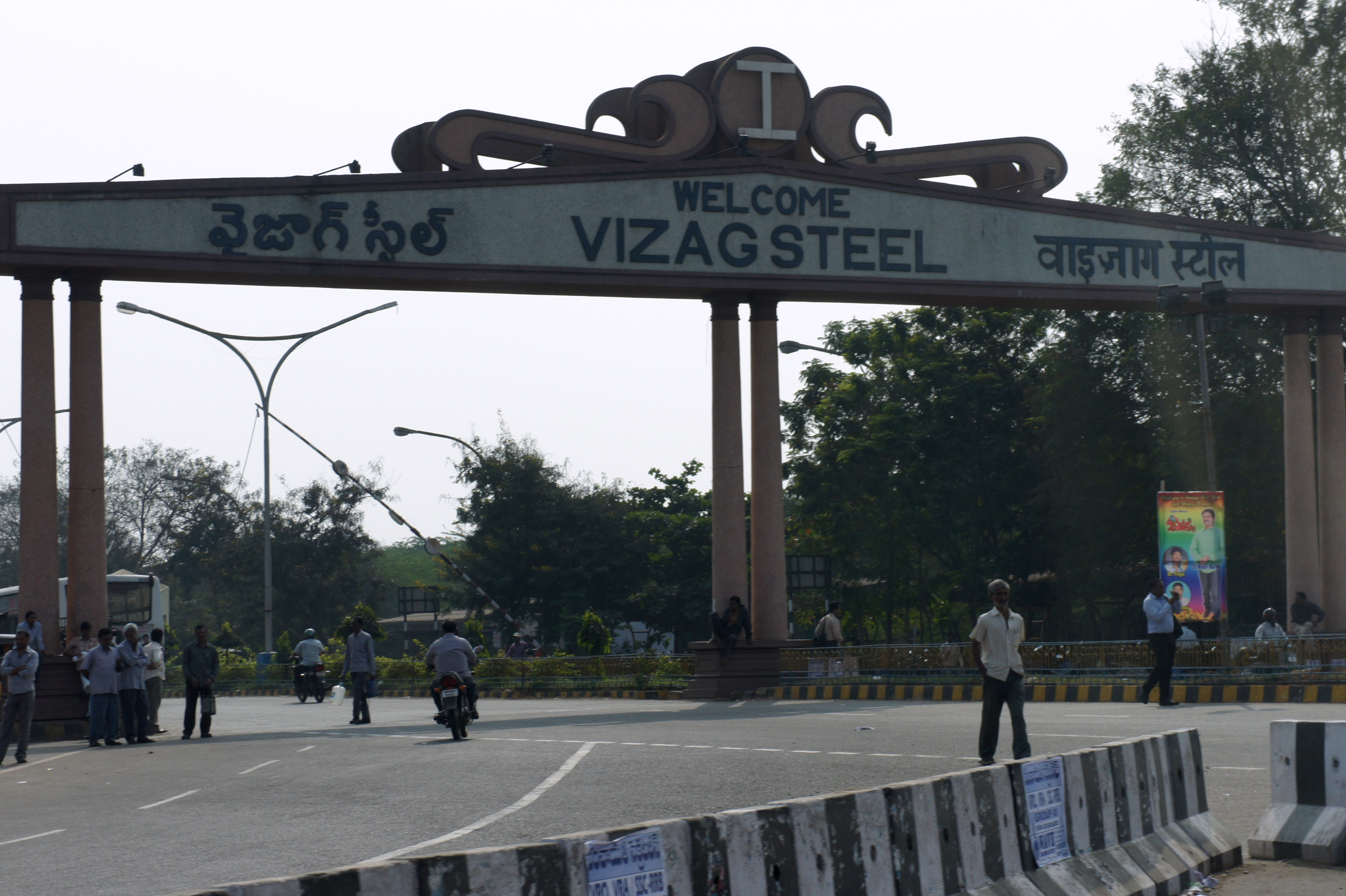
Vizag steel plant entrance

Visakhapatnam is one of the 100 fastest growing cities in the world. The usual seafood exporting capacity of the harbour is 115,000 tonnes (127,000 short tons) and during the FY 2015, it topped seafood exports in terms of value among other ports. Visakhapatnam Port and Gangavaram Port are the two ports of the city and the former one topped charts which handled 60,000,000 tonnes (66,000,000 short tons) of cargo during the financial year 2016–17. The Hindustan Shipyard undertakes building and repairing of Naval fleet.

=== Information technology ===
The growth in the IT sector in recent times has boosted the local economy. In 2016–17, the IT industry in Visakhapatnam witnessed an increase in its turnover which recorded as ₹54 billion (US$560 million) with more than 350 firms, in contrast to 2013–14 figures of ₹1,450 crore (equivalent to ₹27 billion or US$280 million in 2026). Sunrise Startup Village, an incubation centre and Fintech Valley Vizag were established to promote the city as a global fintech capital in the Andhra Pradesh state. Millennium IT Towers 1 was inaugurated by the then Chief Minister of Andhra Pradesh N. Chandrababu Naidu on 15 February 2019 and Millennium IT Towers 2 is in pipeline to promote fintech investments in the city.

There are many national and multi-national IT/ITes and fintech firms such as IBM, Wipro, Tech Mahindra, Kenexa, Fluentgrid, Conduent, Cyient, Paytm, Concentrix, Sutherland, HSBC, etc. Some more investments are in line, like Google X, Lalith Ahuja's ANSR Consulting, Franklin Templeton, Innova Solutions, etc. at Fintech Valley in the city.

In July 2025, it was reported that Google plans to invest US$6 billion to build a 1-gigawatt data centre campus in Visakhapatnam. The project, which includes approximately US$2 billion for renewable energy infrastructure, is expected to be the company's largest data centre development in Asia. The initiative aligns with Andhra Pradesh’s broader goal of creating 6 GW of total data centre capacity within five years and is intended to support growing demands for cloud computing, artificial intelligence, and low-latency digital services in India.

=== Other industries ===
The Jawaharlal Nehru Pharma City (JNPC) developed at Parawada near Visakhapatnam in 2,400 acres (9.7 km^{2}) has major pharma companies like, Hospira, Mylan, Eisai, Reddy's Lab, Aurobindo Pharma, Torrent pharma, Divis Lab, etc. Andhra Pradesh Medtech Zone Limited, is the India's first Ultra Modern Medical Equipment Manufacturing & Testing Facility, open to Manufacturers & Innovators.

The prevalence of ferroalloy plants is due to the availability of manganese ore near Visakhapatnam. Aluminium refineries such as AnRak Aluminium and Jindal Aluminium are developing because of the bauxite reserves around the city. Visakhapatnam is a part of the Petroleum, Chemical and Petrochemical Investment Region (PCPIR), proposed between Visakhapatnam and Kakinada. The PCPIR is expected to generate 1.2 million jobs and require a projected investment of ₹400 billion (US$4.2 billion). NTPC's 2,000MW Simhadri Super Thermal Power Station is undergoing an expansion with the construction of an addition supercritical unit that will generate between 660 and 1,000 MW. Hindujas has begun construction of a 1,070 MW thermal power plant in Visakhapatnam district at a cost of US$1.25 billion.

== Cityscape ==
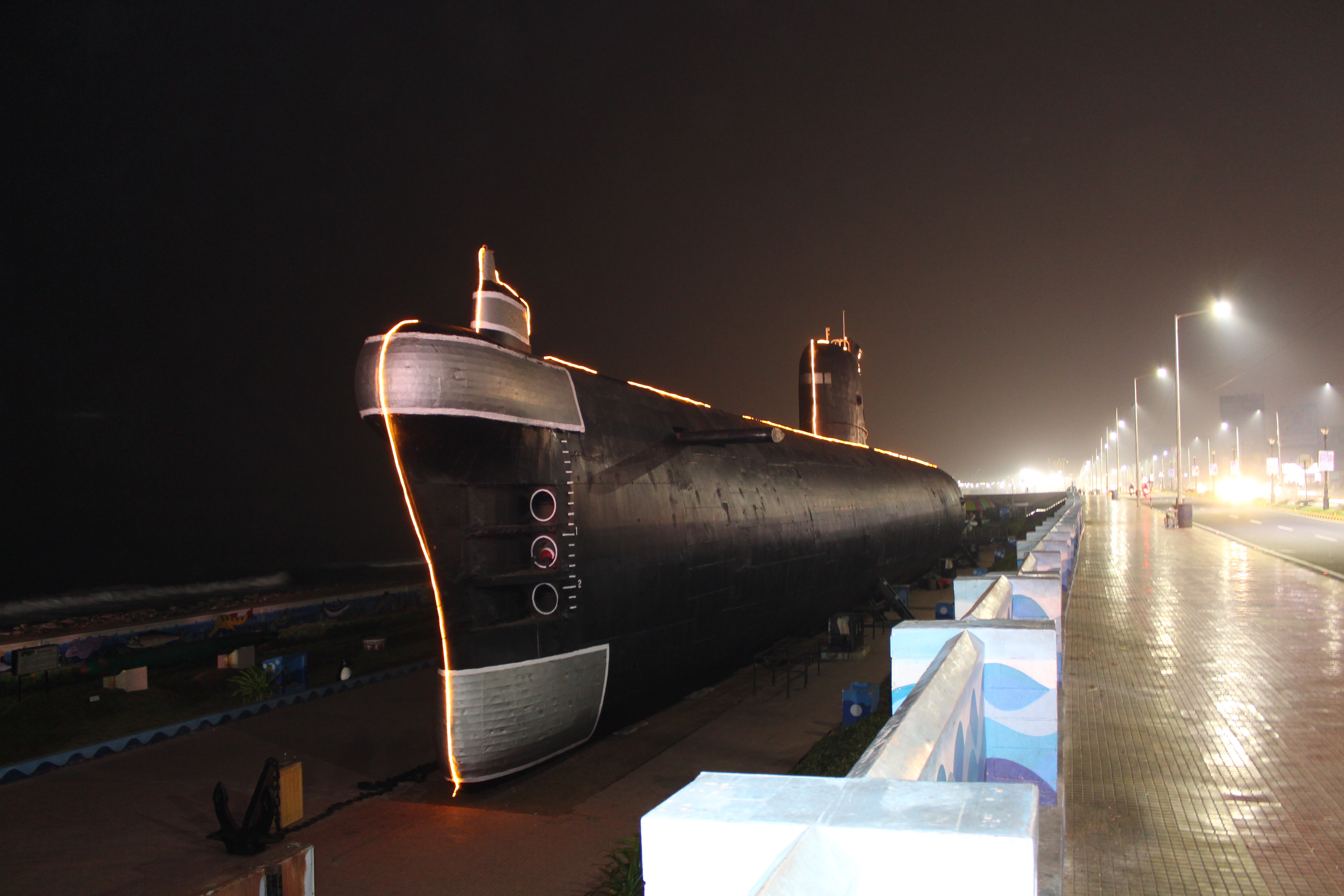
INS Kursura (S20)

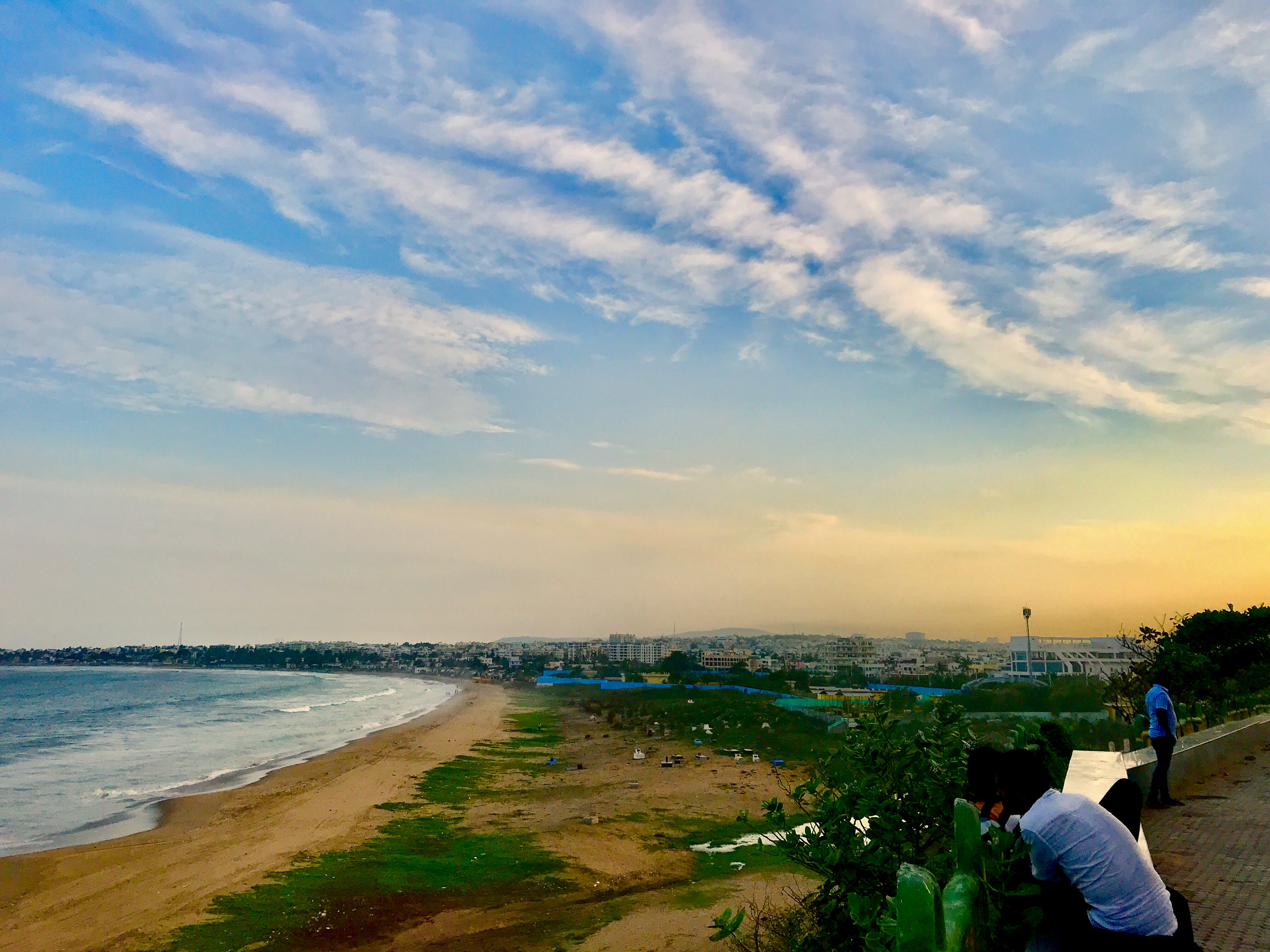
City scape from beach road near Tenneti park

=== Neighbourhoods ===
Over the years, Visakhapatnam has turned from a fishing village into a commercial city with busy streets. Most notable areas of the city include urban areas like Allipuram, Arilova, Asilmetta, Dwaraka Nagar, Gajuwaka, Gopalapatnam, Jagadamba Centre, Lawsons Bay Colony, Pendurthi, Maddilapalem, Madhurawada, MVP Colony, Rushikonda, Seethammadhara, Siripuram and semi-rural suburbs such as Anakapalle, Bheemunipatnam, Duvvada, Parawada, Kommadi and Thagarapuvalasa .

=== Landmarks ===
Visakhapatnam is one of the main tourism destinations in the state of Andhra Pradesh. The city is known for its beaches, caves and the Eastern Ghats as well as wildlife sanctuaries. About 30% of the city is covered with greenery.

Major landmarks in the city include Dolphin's Nose, Kailasagiri, Beach Road, VMRDA Park, Visakha Museum and Matsyadarsini (an aquarium). The INS Kursura Submarine Museum and Anti-submarine warfare (ASW) aircraft TU 142 Aircraft Museum opposite to each other is the only one of its kind in the world, conceptualising the hunted and hunter of the wars. Indira Gandhi Zoological Park in the city has variety of wildlife species. Erra Matti Dibbalu (Red sand dunes) are situated between Visakhapatnam and Bheemunipatnam are one of the geo-heritage sites in the country. This tourist spot is now protected and preserved as a heritage site. D Ramanaidu Film Studio is one of the film shooting destinations in the city. Telugu Samskruthika Niketanam on atop Kailasagiri was developed by World Telugu Federation and Visakhapatnam Urban Development Authority, Adding one more feather to its cap, Visakhapatnam is home to India's tallest musical fountain opened in the Vuda City Central Park. Oscillating vertically at 360 degrees, the fountain dances to the tune of digital music in different colours.

Beaches along the coastline of the Bay of Bengal include RK Beach, Rushikonda Beach, and Mangamaripeta Beach. Others are Yarada, Bheemili, Lawson's Bay, Tenneti, Sagar Nagar, Thotlakonda and Gangavaram beaches. Borra Caves are caves discovered by British geologist William King in 1807. Tyda (an Eco-tourism project), Kambalakonda Wildlife Sanctuary under Andhra Pradesh Forest Department are wildlife conservation sites near the city.

== Culture ==
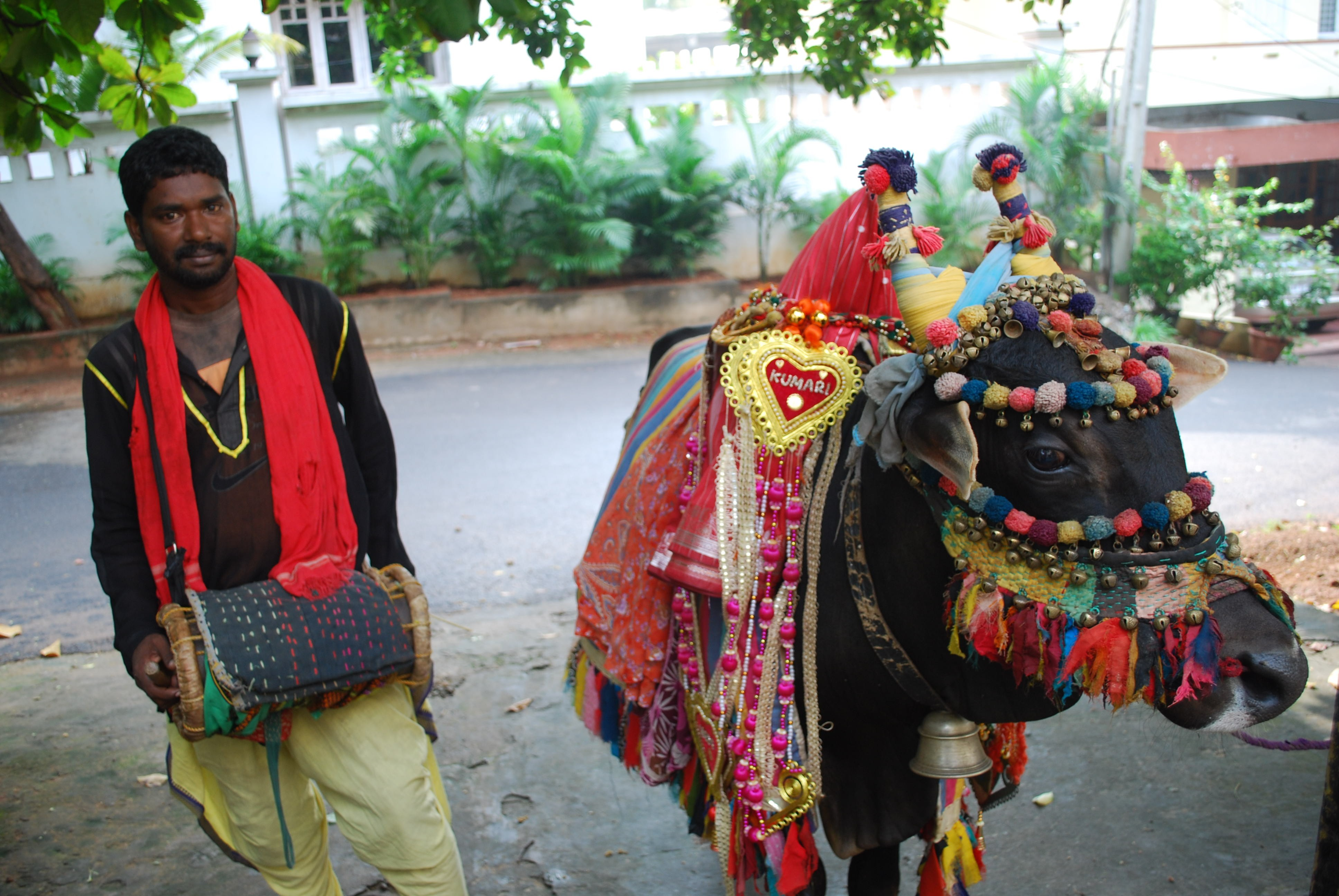
A villager with a decorated bull during Pongal festival

The city embraces rich religious diversity, with Hinduism being the majority religion, alongside Islam, Christianity, and Buddhism. Telugu is the predominantly spoken language, reflecting the city's cosmopolitan culture with a significant presence of Odia, Hindi, Tamil, and Malayalam speakers. Visakhapatnam offers a blend of South Indian and Western cuisines, with popular dishes like Moori Mixture and bamboo chicken of Araku Valley. The city celebrates various festivals including Makar Sankranti, Ugadi, Vinayaka Chavithi, Diwali, and Dasara. Cricket is the most favoured sport, with facilities like the Dr. Y. S. Rajasekhara Reddy ACA–VDCA Cricket Stadium. Additionally, the city is home to attractions like the Telugu Samskruthika Niketanam Museum, Submarine Museum, TUV, and Harrier aircraft museums.

=== Poets ===
Some of the notable poets from the city include Sri Sri, Gollapudi Maruti Rao, Sirivennela Seetharama Sastry.

=== Religious sites ===
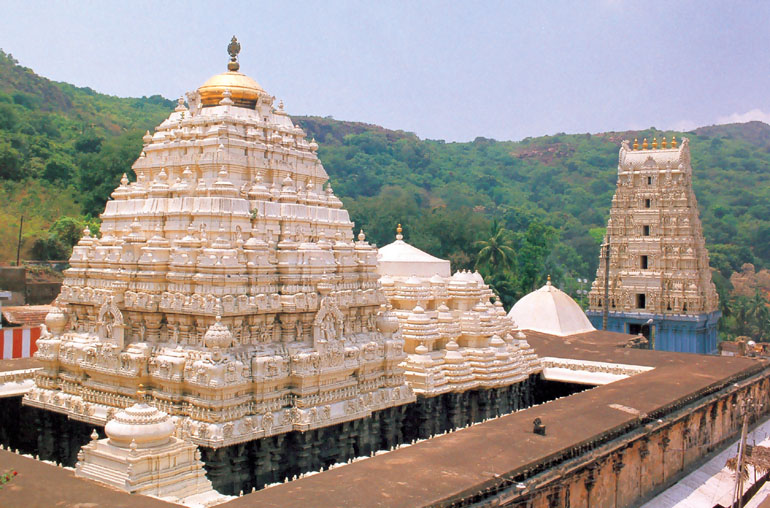
Simhachalam Temple

Some of the religious sites are also of great importance like Simhachalam temple of Lord Narasimha 16 km (9.9 mi) north of the city, and Sri Kanaka Maha Lakshmi Temple. Archaeological excavations of Buddhist shrines and sites, including Thotlakonda, Bavikonda, Pavuralakonda and Panchadarla, revealed Buddhist dominance in this area.

== Transport ==
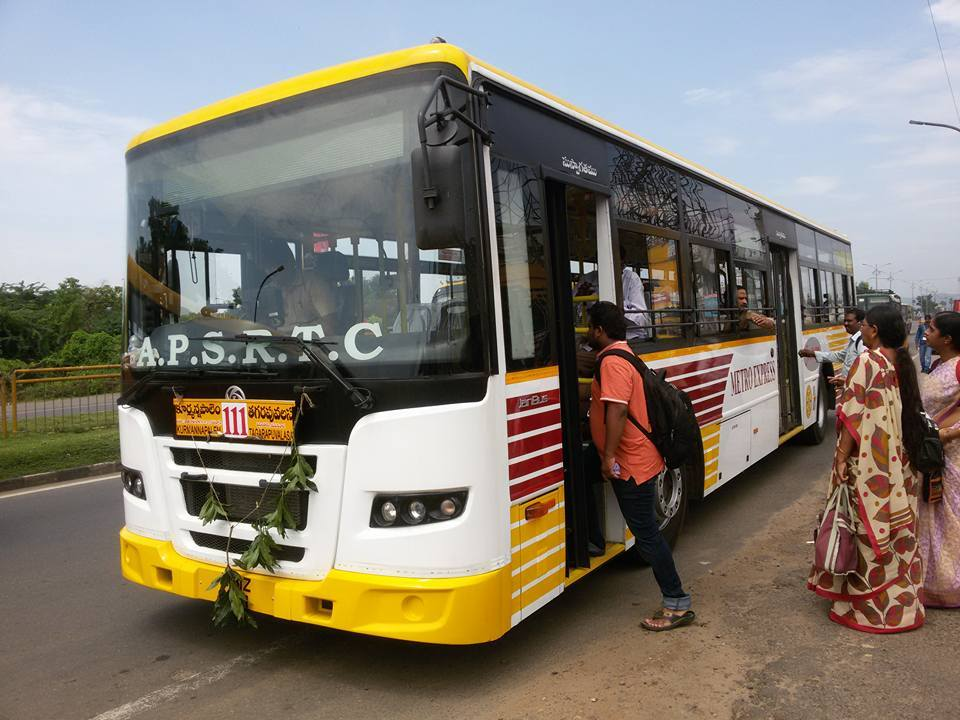
Visakhapatnam Metro Express Highway Service at Kurmannapalem

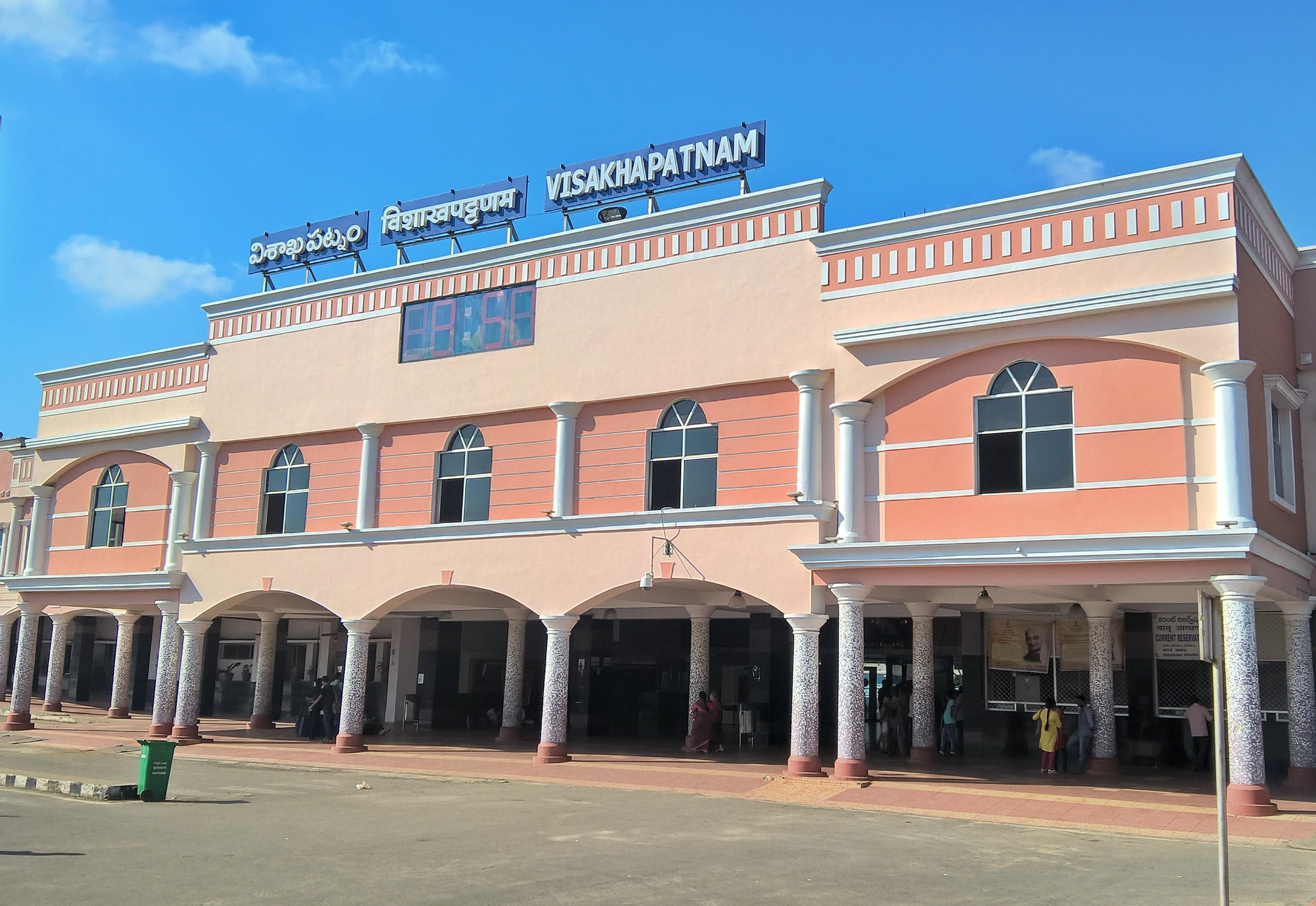
Visakhapatnam Junction railway station

The city commuters prefer city buses and auto rickshaw as the primary mode of transport, followed by two-wheelers and cars. Road and rail are preferred for long-distance commuting and are supported by Dwaraka bus station and Visakhapatnam Junction railway station respectively. It also has sea and air travel infrastructure such as Visakhapatnam Port and Alluri Sitarama Raju International Airport.

The APSRTC operates city, district, and inter-state bus services from Dwaraka bus station. Over 600 city buses operate over 150 routes, in addition to Bus Rapid Transit System in two corridors of Pendurthi and Simhachalam. A planned Integrated Bus Terminal Complex would be built at Maddilapalem. Apart from buses, there are about 25,000 auto rickshaws plying on the city roads which provide intermediate public transport.

Visakhapatnam is the headquarters of the South Coast Railway zone of Indian railways. Visakhapatnam railway station is as an A1 station with the highest gross revenue in the Visakhapatnam railway division. It serves an average of 20,000–25,000 passengers daily and may rise to 40,000 during festivals. It has the country's largest diesel locomotive shed with a capacity of 206. and other major Railway stations are Duvvada railway station, Pendurti railway station and Simhachalam railway station. Visakhapatnam Metro is a planned metro rail project.

As of 2013, the percentage of transport mode shares in the city are, 18% buses, 9% autos, 15% two-wheelers, 2% cars and 55% non-motorised transport (bicycles and pedestrians). The total road network accounts for a total length of 2,007.10 km (1,247.15 mi). NH16, a major highway and a part of the Golden Quadrilateral system bypasses the city.

Visakhapatnam Airport had served a total of 2,815,205 passengers in 2018, an increase of 16.8% from the previous year. It handled a total of 23,264 aircraft during that year.

Visakhapatnam Port is one of 13 major ports in India and the only major port of Andhra Pradesh. It is India's second-largest port by volume of cargo handled. It is located on the east coast of India and is located midway between the Chennai and Kolkata Ports. Cruise shipping is operational between Visakhapatnam and Andaman and Nicobar islands.

== Education ==
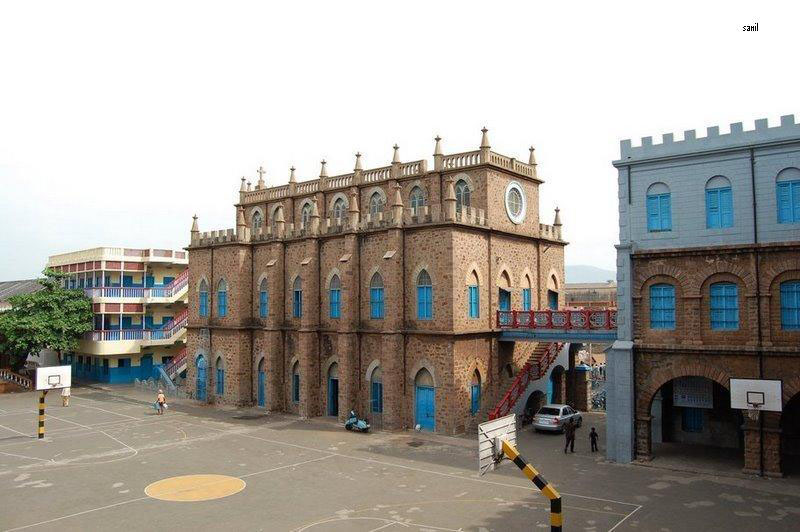
St Aloysius' Anglo-Indian High School (SAS) established in 1847 in Visakhapatnam, Andhra Pradesh

Primary and secondary school education is imparted by government, aided and private schools, under the School Education Department of the state. As per the school information report for the academic year 2016–17, urban Visakhapatnam had 1,44,268 (Western: 144,268) students enrolled in 434 schools. The Central Board of Secondary Education, Secondary School Certificate or the Indian Certificate of Secondary Education are the different types of syllabus followed by different schools. The medium of instruction followed by schools are English and Telugu. The St. Aloysius Anglo Indian Boys High School is the oldest school in the city to have established in the year 1847. The Visakhapatnam District Central Library is supported by the government and is located at Dwaraka Nagar.

There are tens of junior colleges under Government, Andhra Pradesh Social Welfare Residential and private undertakings. Andhra University is the only autonomous college approved under Universities Grant Commission scheme. Mrs. A. V. N. College is one of the oldest educational institution in the city.

The GITAM University and the Gayatri Vidya Parishad College of Engineering are other technical education institutions in the city. Visakhapatnam is also home to Damodaram Sanjivayya National Law University (DSNLU), which is the National Law University for the state of Andhra Pradesh. DSNLU takes entrance through Common Law Admission Test and ranks 15th by order of establishment among the 17 National Law Universities. The city is due to get India's first packaging park with an Indian Institute of Packaging, IIP and BITS Pilani & Birla International School under the aegis of Sarala Birla Academy.

The Indian Maritime University (IMU) was established as a central university by the government of India by an act of Parliament (the Indian Maritime University Act 2008). IMU is poised to play a role in the development of human resources for the maritime sector. The city also has the National Institute of Oceanography. The Indian Institute of Management, Indian Institute of Petroleum and Energy are the other institutions of national importance.

== Defence and research ==
=== Naval base ===
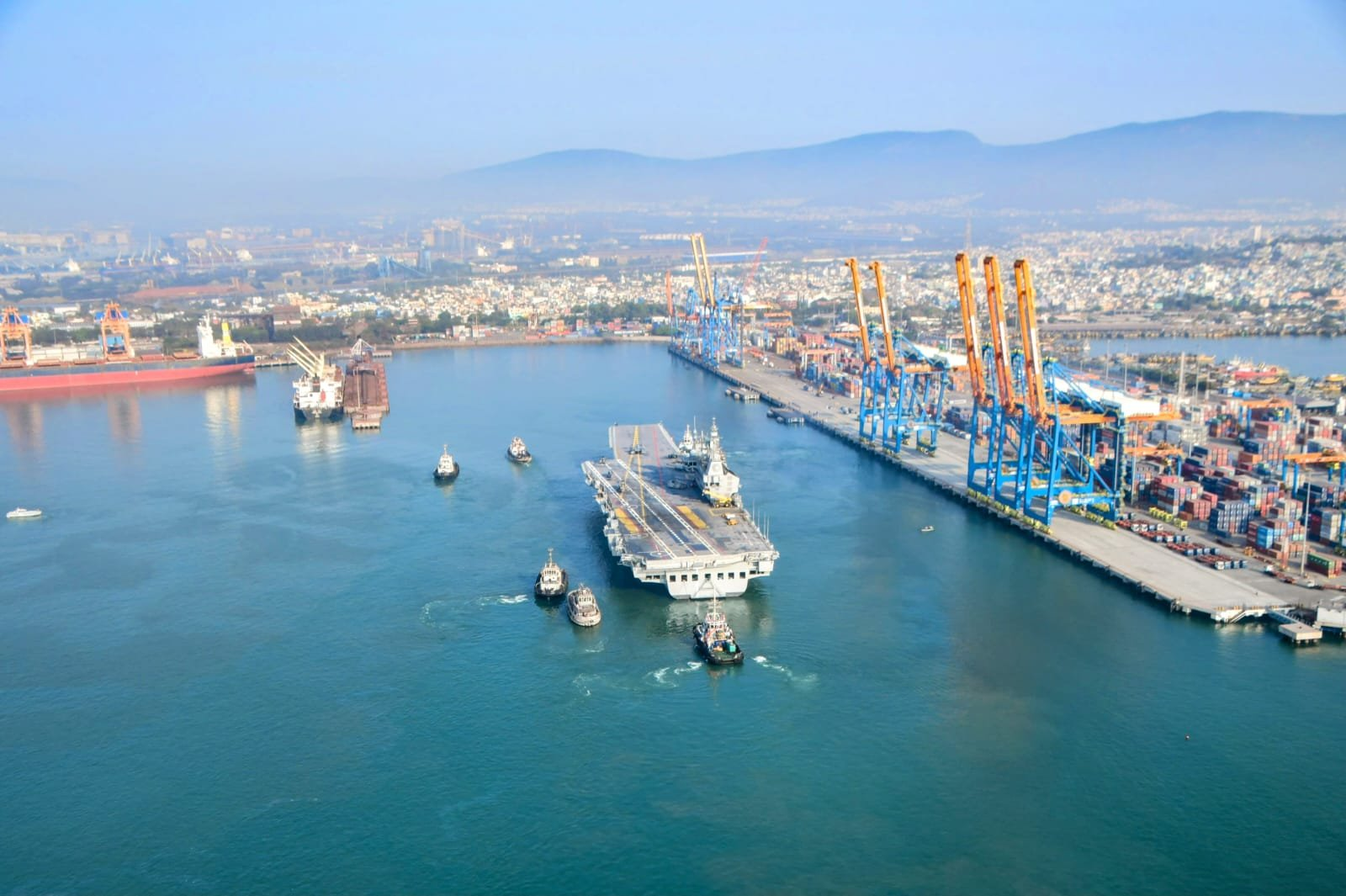
INS Vikrant makes a grand debut at the scenic port of Visakhapatnam for MILAN 2024

Visakhapatnam is the headquarters of the Eastern Naval Command, the Naval Science and Technological Laboratory (a DRDO Lab), a Chief Quality Assurance Establishment (CQAE), an EFS office, a naval dockyard (established in 1949) and naval bases including INS Virbahu, INS Karna, INS Kalinga, INS Samudrika, INS Satavahana, and INS Dega. A new base at INS Rambilli is being built on 5,000 acres (20 km^{2}) with an investment of ₹15 billion (equivalent to ₹28 billion or US$290 million in 2026), as the first dedicated nuclear submarine base in India. India's first nuclear submarine, the INS Arihant was launched in the Naval Dockyard, and Bharat Dynamics has begun manufacturing torpedoes. The city also has the presence of the Indian Coast Guard, including ships and offices. Multiple naval training establishments, such as the Navy ShipWright School, are also situated here.

=== Research organisations ===
The Bhabha Atomic Research Centre (BARC) has its second research facility in the country (after Trombay) in Atchutapuram mandal in the district. There are also offices of the National Institute of Oceanography and the India Meteorological Department.

== Sports ==
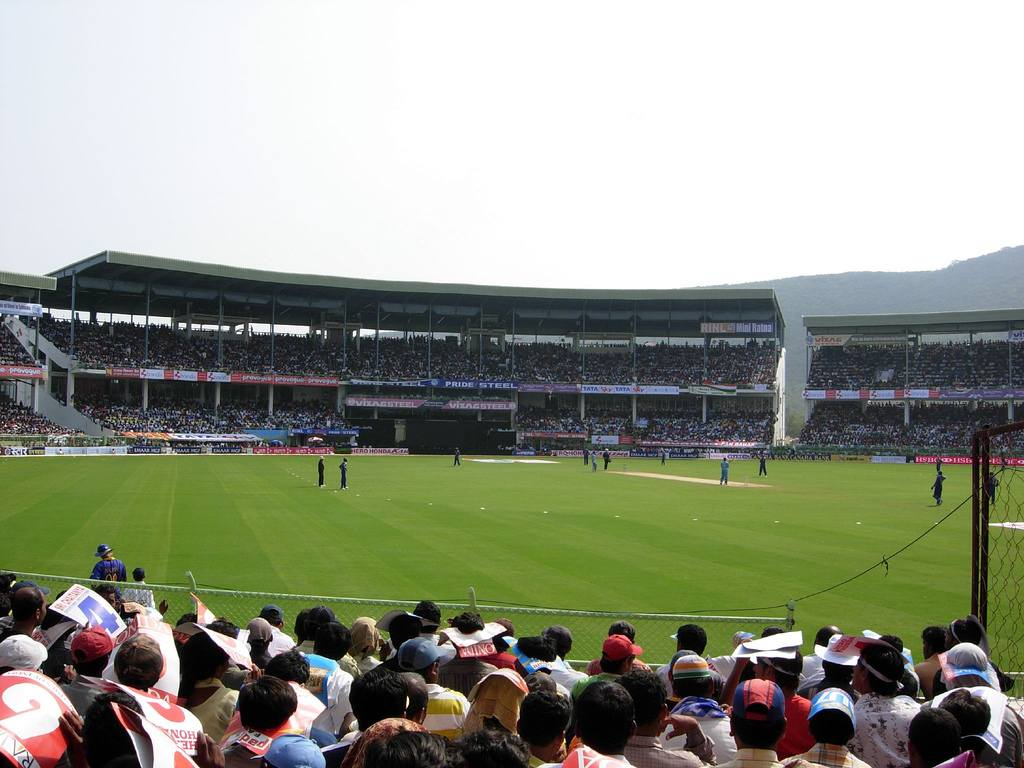
Dr. Y. S. Rajasekhara Reddy International Cricket Stadium at PM Palem

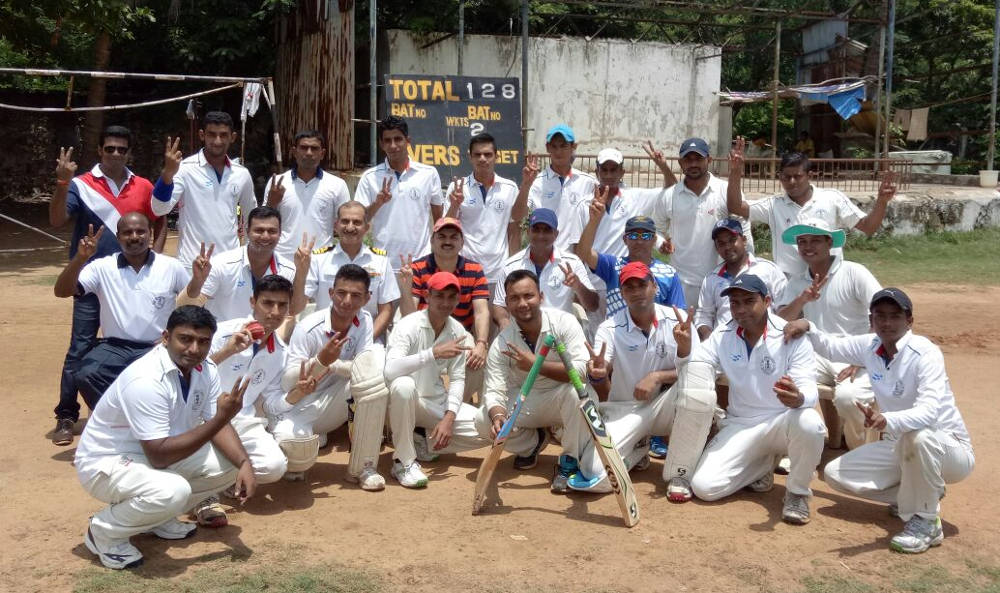
ENC Cricket Team which won the VDCA Institutional League Cricket Championship 2015–16

Cricket is the most popular sport, followed by tennis and football. Visakhapatnam is home to several local cricket teams participating in district and zonal matches. Gully cricket or backyard cricket (a form of cricket played in streets or parks) is a popular sport among local youth. Visakhapatnam co-hosted the 32nd National Games alongside Hyderabad in 2002. The city has seven cricket stadiums, which are used for Ranji Trophy matches; two of these stadiums have been used for one day international (ODI) matches. Indira Priyadarshini Stadium, also known as the Municipal Corporation Stadium, hosted the first ODI match on 9 December 1988 and the last ODI on 3 April 2001. The stadium was discontinued in favour of the new Dr. Y. S. Rajasekhara Reddy International Cricket Stadium, PM Palem.

Dr. Y. S. Rajasekhara Reddy International Cricket Stadium is the home of Andhra Cricket Association. It regularly hosts Ranji Trophy, One Day Internationals, and Test Internationals. The stadium is the home ground of Andhra cricket team. The stadium also hosted IPL matches as a neutral venue. It hosted its first test match against England beginning on 17 November 2016.

Port Trust Golden Jubilee Stadium is the second largest stadium in Visakhapatnam, which has hosted Under-19 Youth Internationals. It also hosted the 2014 Pro Kabaddi League season as the home ground for the Telugu Titans.Swarna Bharathi Indoor Stadium, built by the Greater Visakhapatnam Municipal Corporation, is used for various indoor sports, and the GVMC Aqua Sports Complex, an aquatic centre for swimming and diving, is near the beach road.

Surfing activities are common at the Rushikonda beach. Scuba diving at Chintapalli in the scenic city has been attracting tourists from all over. There is also a golf course named East Point Golf Club in the city.

== Media ==
The Telugu dailies publishers in the city are Eenadu, Andhra Jyothy, Sakshi, Andhra Bhoomi, Andhra Prabha, Vaartha, Suryaa, Prajasakti and Visalaandhra. Apart from the local language, there are also English papers such as The Hindu, The Times of India, Deccan Chronicle, The Hindu Business Line, The New Indian Express and The Hans India.

=== FM stations ===
- Radio City – 91.1 – Telugu/Hindi
- Big 92.7 FM – 92.7 – Telugu/Hindi
- Red FM – 93.5 – Telugu/Hindi
- Radio Mirchi – 98.3 – Telugu
- AIR Primary – 101.6 – Telugu
- AIR FM Rainbow – 102.0 – Telugu
- Visakha FM – 105.6 – Telugu
- Gyan Vani – 106.4 – Telugu/English/Hindi

=== DRM ===
- Air Vizag - 918 kHz, 2 stations

== Notable people ==
- Concordia Merrel
- Edward Hay Mackenzie Elliot
- Tenneti Viswanadham
- Sri Sri
- Aarudhra
- Malla Vijaya prasad
- Ramana Gogula
- Devika Rani
- Venugopal Rao
- Gode Venkata Juggarow

== See also ==
- List of cities in India by population
- List of municipal corporations in India
- List of tourist attractions and events in Visakhapatnam
- List of neighbourhoods in Visakhapatnam
- List of urban agglomerations in Andhra Pradesh
- Largest Indian cities by GDP
