= Millennium IT Towers =

Business park in Visakhapatnam, India

Coordinates: 17.808777°N 83.387581°E

- Interactive map of the Millennium IT Towers area

General information
- Type: Information Technology Park
- Location: Rushikonda, Visakhapatnam, India
- Completed: 2019
- Inaugurated: 15 February 2019
- Cost: ₹ 145 crore

Height
- Top floor: 10

Technical details
- Floor count: 11
- Floor area: 16,000 m^{2} (170,000 sq ft)

Design and construction
- Architect: CP kukreja architects
- Developer: Andhra Pradesh Industrial Infrastructure Corporation

Millennium IT Towers is an information technology (IT) park situated in the city of Visakhapatnam, India. It was set up for the growth of information technology and as an initiative in making Visakhapatnam city as a Financial-tech (Fintech) Capital in the state of Andhra Pradesh by the APIIC and Government of Andhra Pradesh. Millennium IT Tower 1 was inaugurated by then Chief Minister of Andhra Pradesh N. Chandrababu Naidu on 15 February 2019

== Infrastructure ==
Millennium IT Towers is a 11-storied building, and one of the largest IT towers in Visakhapatnam IT Zone, with two basements, ground floor, 10 upper floors and a parking ground and has a built-up area of 16,000 m^{2} (170,000 sq ft) with centralised air-conditioning and an independent power supply and initial employment will be 5,000 jobs.

== See also ==
- Fintech Valley Vizag
