= Erra Matti Dibbalu =

Geological formation in Andhra Pradesh, India

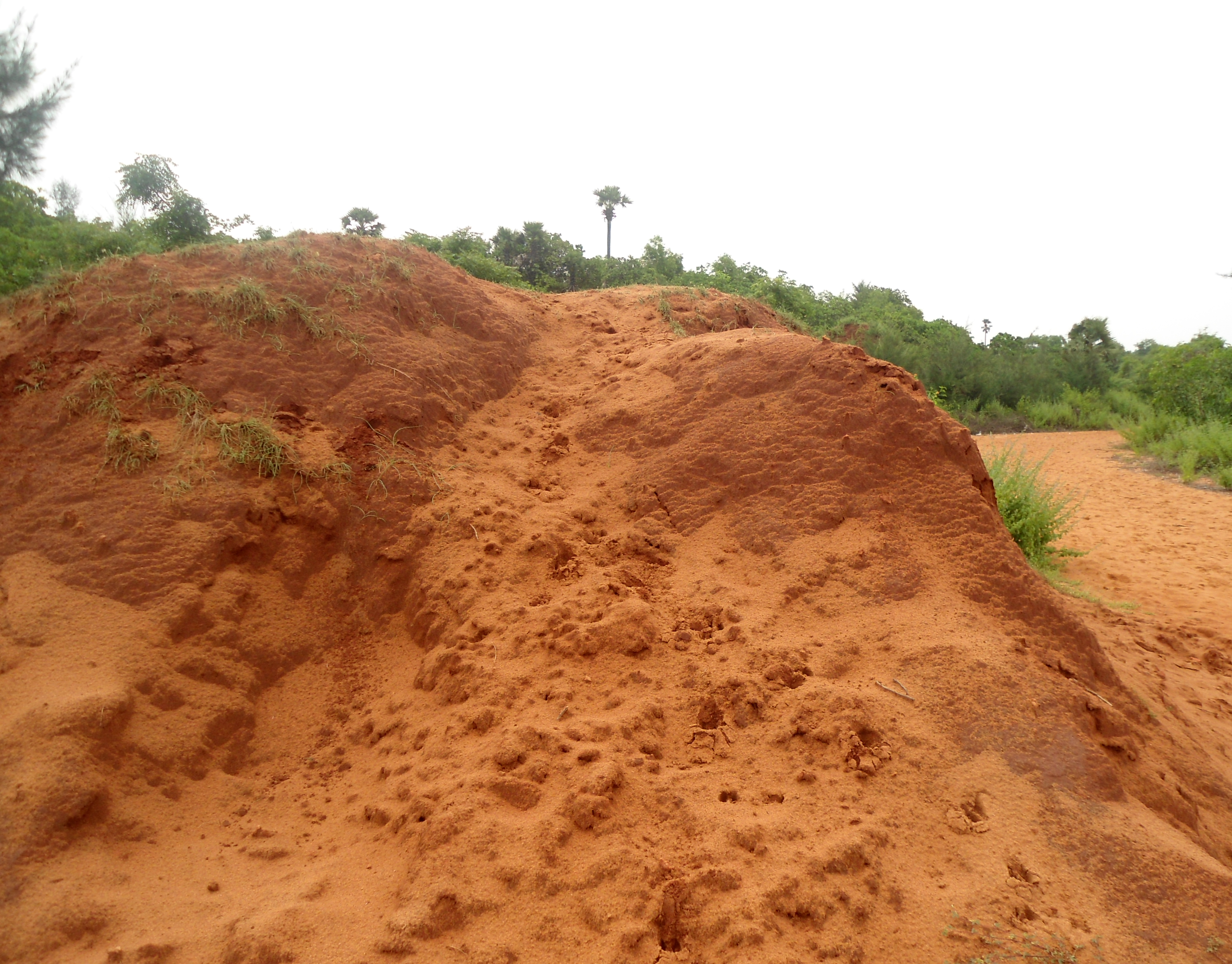
- Interactive map of Erra Matti Dibbalu
- Coordinates: 17.874948°N 83.431598°E
- Location: Visakhapatnam district, Andhra Pradesh, India

National Geological Monuments of India
- Official name: Erra Matti Dibbalu
- Designated: 2016
- Designated by: Geological Survey of India

Erra Matti Dibbalu (lit Red Sand Hills) is a geological formation along the Bay of Bengal coast in Visakhapatnam district of the Indian state of Andhra Pradesh. It was notified as a National Geological Monument by the Geological Survey of India in 2016.

== Geography ==
The red sand hills are located near Vishakhapatnam in Andhra Pradesh. The hills stretch for over 1,500 acres (610 ha) along the Bay of Bengal coast.

The site was first documented by geologist William King of the Geological Survey of India (GSI) in 1886. About 3 km^{2} (1.2 sq mi) of the site on the outskirts of Vishakhapatnam was notified as a National Geological Monument by the GSI in 2016.

== Geology ==
These red sand mounds along the coast were formed by erosion of deposited sediments. Initially formed during the late Quaternary period, the feature continued to evolve over the years with alternating wet and dry periods and changing sea levels. As per a 2006 study, the average age of the formation was dated to 57,479 to 49,964 BP. The study further concluded that the formation which began during the late Pleistocene continued into the Holocene and the structure stabilised at about 18,000 BP.
