= ANSR =

Consulting firm based in Dallas, Texas, US and operating in India

ANSR Inc.
- Founded: 2004
- Headquarters: Dallas, United States of America
- Key people: Lalit Ahuja (Founder & CEO), Vikram Ahuja (Co-Founder & Managing Director)
- Products: Global Capability Centers
- Website: Official website

ANSR is a consulting company that assists businesses in establishing and operating global capability centres (GCCs), also known as global in-house centres (GICs).

== History ==
=== 2004–2019 ===
ANSR was founded in 2004 by Lalit Ahuja with a joint venture with Target Corporation in India.

In June 2015, Accel invested $9 million in ANSR. The funding was intended to support the establishment of new GICs in the country and to initiate an engagement program for startups to collaborate with multinational corporations.

In 2015, ANSR introduced the GCC service model to manage and scale global teams without requiring capital investment.

In September 2019, PepsiCo partnered with ANSR, to assist in establishing their GCC in Hyderabad.

In 2019, ANSR formed a partnership with Automation Anywhere, to provide the intelligent RPA platform to its GCC customers to support their RPA initiatives.

During this period, ANSR has brought over 60 GCCs to India, including Wells Fargo, Target, Delta Air Lines, PepsiCo, Lowe’s and Saks Fifth Avenue.

=== 2020–2022 ===
In November 2020, ANSR acquired FastNext, an AI-driven recruitment firm, in an all-stock deal. This acquisition aimed at automating recruitment processes and enhancing efficiency. It supports ANSR's talent platform, Talent500, in driving AI-led recruitment innovation.

In November 2020, ANSR partnered with Google Cloud to accelerate digital transformation for GCCs. The collaboration aims to help enterprises transition to a cloud-first strategy, enabling them to build digital transformation capabilities at scale.

In December 2020, IBM and ANSR announced a strategic collaboration to establish and manage Centers of Excellence focused on advanced enterprise technologies, including cloud, analytics, artificial intelligence, and automation for GCCs.

In May 2021, ANSR raised $15 million in Series B funding from the Sistema Asia Fund and Evolvence India Fund. The funding was to support ANSR’s plans to expand GCC locations in eastern Europe, the UAE, and Canada, as well as develop AI-based products including Leap, Loop and Rise.

In 2022, ANSR unveiled its refreshed brand identity and the new company logo.

ANSR, along with group firm Talent500, partnered with Abu Dhabi Investment Office invest $100 million towards this initiative. Through this, ANSR will work with Indian companies to set up teams in the region, with a bid to make global setup scalable and cost-competitive to India.

Between 2020 and July 2022, ANSR partnered with Northern Tool + Equipment, 7-Eleven, 3M, Inspire Brands, and Neiman Marcus Group to assist in establishing their GCCs.

=== 2023–2024 ===
In October 2023, ServiceNow invested in ANSR through ServiceNow Ecosystem Ventures, which has committed $150 million to invest in partners, and is also focusing on regions to expand ServiceNow offerings across industries, domains, and go-to-market.

In January 2024, ANSR’s subsidiary Talent500 launched TalentInsights, an AI-powered system to source, screen and hire professionals.

In July 2024, Accenture invested $170 million (Rs 1,400 crore) for a minority stake in ANSR. The investment supports ANSR’s services in building and managing GCCs, which contribute to global enterprises’ talent and technology needs.

In August 2024, ANSR acquired hrEntries, a human capital management platform, in an all-stock transaction. The acquisition integrated hrEntries into ANSR’s "GCC SuperApp" stack, which offers systems for talent, workspace, HR operations, and payroll. Following the acquisition, hrEntries was rebranded as Rise, and over 100 employees joined ANSR.

In October 2024, ANSR acquired a majority stake in Summit Consulting Services for Rs 45-65 crore ($5-8 million). This acquisition aims to expand its offerings for mid-sized global capability centres in India.

During this period, ANSR established GCCs for organizations across various sectors, including retail, BFSI, healthcare, travel & logistics, F&B, and product industries. These GCCs include Marriott, BestBuy, Kenvue, Neighborly etc.

In October 2024, ANSR was recognized as a leader in Everest Group’s Global In-house Center (GIC) Setup Capabilities in India under the Provider PEAK Matrix® Assessment for 2024. The recognition reflects ANSR’s expertise in providing setup, design, and administrative support services for global enterprises establishing Global In-house Centers (GICs) or Global Capability Centers (GCCs) in India.

== ANSR Foundation ==
ANSR Foundation, launched in October 2024, is the charitable arm of ANSR, established to address economic disparity and promote gender equality through educational and skill-building initiatives. The foundation's focus includes programs targeted at children and young adults, aiming to nurture future technology leaders. Key initiatives encompass the development of STEM-focused classrooms, scholarship opportunities, and volunteer programs.

On December 2, ANSR made a contribution to Birla Institute of Technology and Science (BITS) Pilani. The donation, made by Lalit Ahuja, supports BITS Pilani's $100 Million Endowment Fund, which focuses on enhancing educational access, research, innovation, and infrastructure development.
