= Adarsh Nagar =

Neighbourhood in Visakhapatnam, India

Adarsh Nagar ఆదర్శ్ నగర్
- Neighbourhood
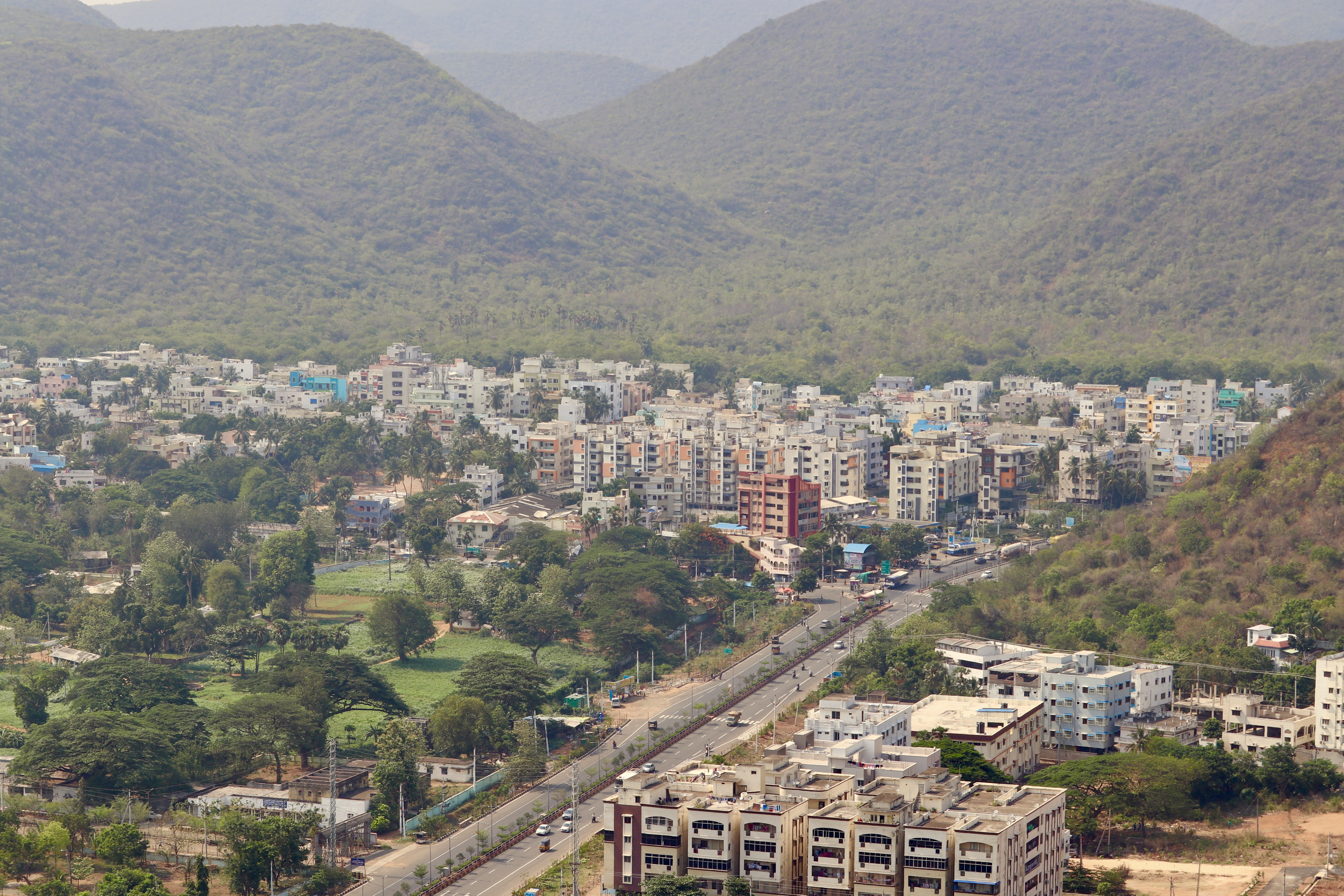
- Adarsh Nagar as seen from Kailasagiri

- Location in Visakhapatnam
- Coordinates: 17.762925°N 83.332361°E
- Country: India
- State: Andhra Pradesh
- District: Visakhapatnam

Government
  - Body: Greater Visakhapatnam Municipal Corporation

Area
  - Total: 0.43 km^{2} (0.17 sq mi)
- Elevation: 11 m (36 ft)

Languages
  - Official: Telugu
- Time zone: UTC+5:30 (IST)
- PIN: 530040
- Vehicle registration: AP-31

Adarsh Nagar is a residential neighbourhood in northern Visakhapatnam, Andhra Pradesh, India. It is administered by the Greater Visakhapatnam Municipal Corporation and falls within the Madhurawada Zone.

== Geography ==
Adarsh Nagar is situated in the northern part of Visakhapatnam city at an elevation of approximately 11 metres (36 ft) above sea level. The neighbourhood is bounded by Arilova to the north, Ravindra Nagar to the east, and Visalakshi Nagar to the south. The Indira Gandhi Zoological Park, located within the Kambalakonda Reserve Forest, lies nearby.

== Transport ==
National Highway 16 (formerly NH 5), a major arterial road connecting Chennai to Kolkata, passes through the area, providing connectivity to other parts of the city and region. The neighbourhood is served by Andhra Pradesh State Road Transport Corporation (APSRTC) buses connecting it to various parts of Visakhapatnam. Visakhapatnam Junction railway station is located approximately 11 kilometres (6.8 mi) from the area.

== Nearby landmarks ==
The area is located near several notable landmarks in Visakhapatnam:

- Indira Gandhi Zoological Park – One of the largest zoological parks in India, spread over 625 acres (253 ha) within the Kambalakonda Reserve Forest
- Kailasagiri – A hilltop park developed by the Visakhapatnam Metropolitan Region Development Authority (VMRDA), known for its Shiva-Parvati statues and panoramic views of the city
- Visakha Institute of Medical Sciences – A government super-speciality hospital established in 2016, located in the nearby Hanumanthavaka area
