= Ravindra Nagar =

- Neighbourhood
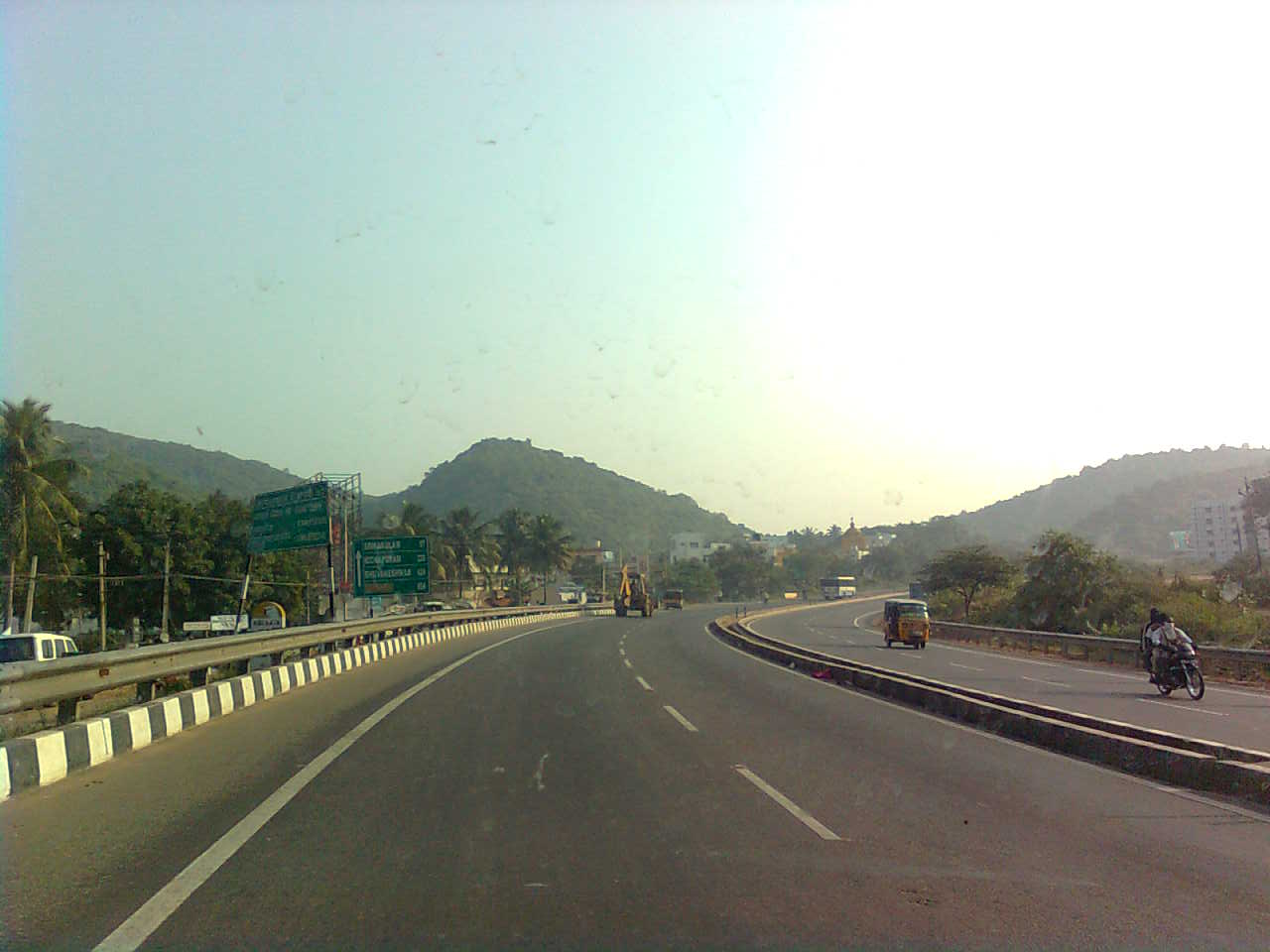
- NH Road near Ravindranagar

- Location in Visakhapatnam
- Coordinates: 17.766192°N 83.321952°E
- Country: India
- State: Andhra Pradesh
- District: Visakhapatnam

Government
  - Body: Greater Visakhapatnam Municipal Corporation

Languages
  - Official: Telugu
- Time zone: UTC+5:30 (IST)
- PIN: 530040
- Vehicle registration: AP-31

Ravindra Nagar is a neighborhood situated on the northern part of Visakhapatnam City, India. The area, which falls under the local administrative limits of Greater Visakhapatnam Municipal Corporation, is about 7 km from the Dwaraka Nagar which is city centre. Ravindra Nagar is located Near to Arilova and surrounded by Kambalakonda Wildlife Sanctuary. its well connected with One Town

== Transport ==
APSRTC routes

Route number	Start	End	Via
52D	Ravindra Nagar	Old Head Post Office	Adarshanagar, Hanumanthuwaka, Maddilapalem, RTC Complex, Jagadamba Centre, Town Kotharoad
210	Ravindra Nagar	Gantyada HB Colony	Adarshanagar, Hanumanthuwaka, Appughar, Pedawaltair, Siripuram, RK Beach, Jagadamba Centre, Town Kotharoad, Convent, Scindia, Malkapuram, New Gajuwaka
