= Visalakshi Nagar =

- Neighbourhood
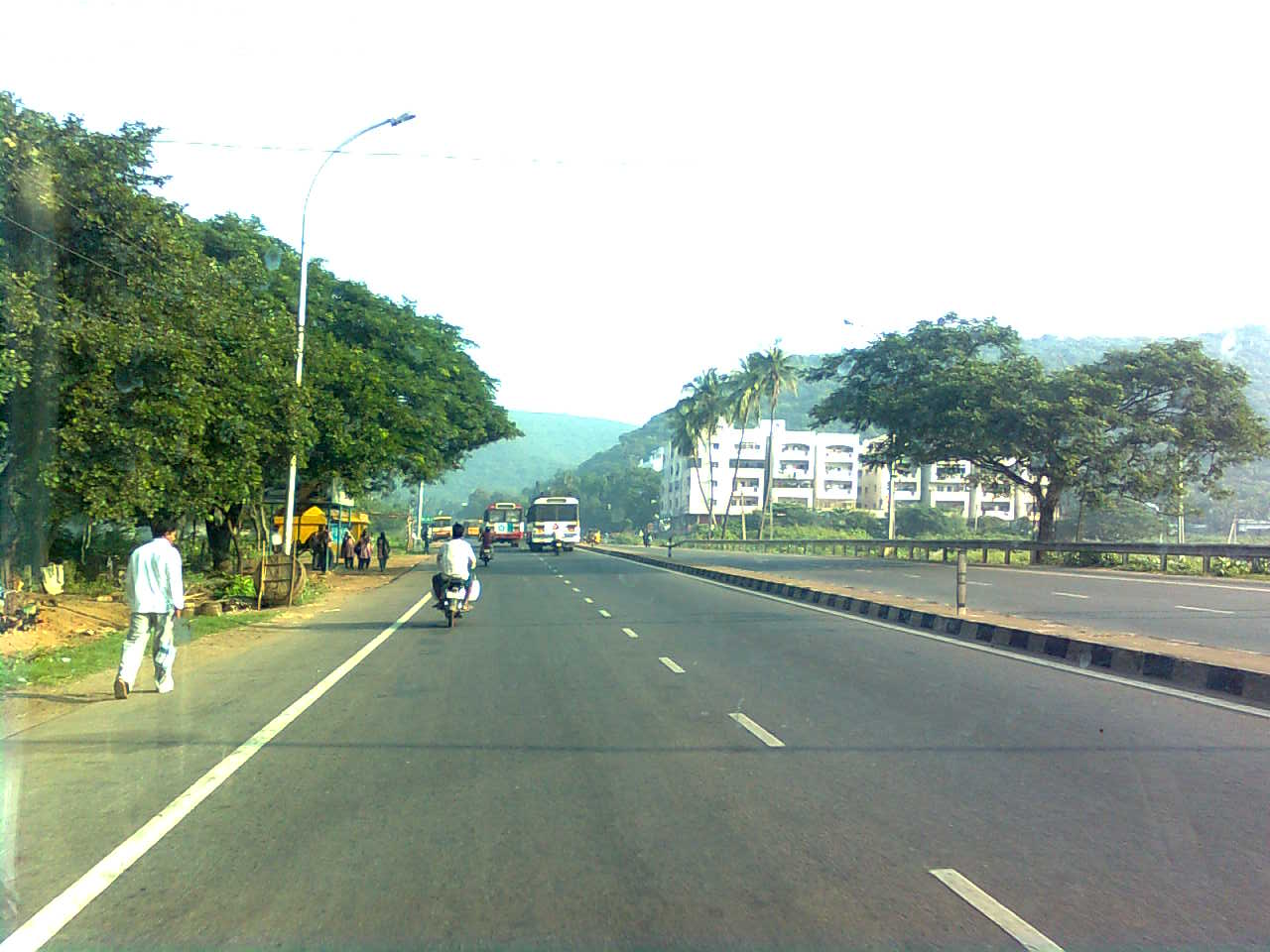
- NH Road near Visalakshinagar

- Location in Visakhapatnam
- Coordinates: 17.755822°N 83.339220°E
- Country: India
- State: Andhra Pradesh
- District: Visakhapatnam

Government
  - Body: Greater Visakhapatnam Municipal Corporation

Languages
  - Official: Telugu
- Time zone: UTC+5:30 (IST)
- PIN: 530043
- Vehicle registration: AP-31

Visalakshinagar is a neighborhood situated on the northern part of Visakhapatnam City, India. The area, which falls under the local administrative limits of Greater Visakhapatnam Municipal Corporation, is about 5 km from the Dwaraka Nagar which is city centre. Visalakshinagar is located at the entrance of Visakhapatnam City on National Highway 16.

== Transport ==
APSRTC routes

Route number	Start	End	Via
52V	Sagarnagar	Old Head Post Office	Visalakshinagar, Hanumanthuwaka, Maddilapalem, RTC Complex, Jagadamba Centre, Town Kotharoad
52S	Sagarnagar	Old Head Post Office	Visalakshinagar, Hanumanthuwaka, Maddilapalem, RTC Complex, Jagadamba Centre, Town Kotharoad
52Z	Sagarnagar	RK Beach	Visalakshinagar, Hanumanthuwaka, Maddilapalem, RTC Complex, Jagadamba Centre
52V/G	Gollala Yendada	Town Kotharoad	Visalakshinagar, Hanumanthuwaka, Maddilapalem, RTC Complex, Jagadamba Centre
10K	Kailasagiri	RTC Complex	Police Quarters, Appughar, Vudapark, RK Beach, Jagadamba Centre
