= Kambalakonda Wildlife Sanctuary =

Forest near Visakhapatnam, Andhra Pradesh, India

- IUCN category IV (habitat/species management area)
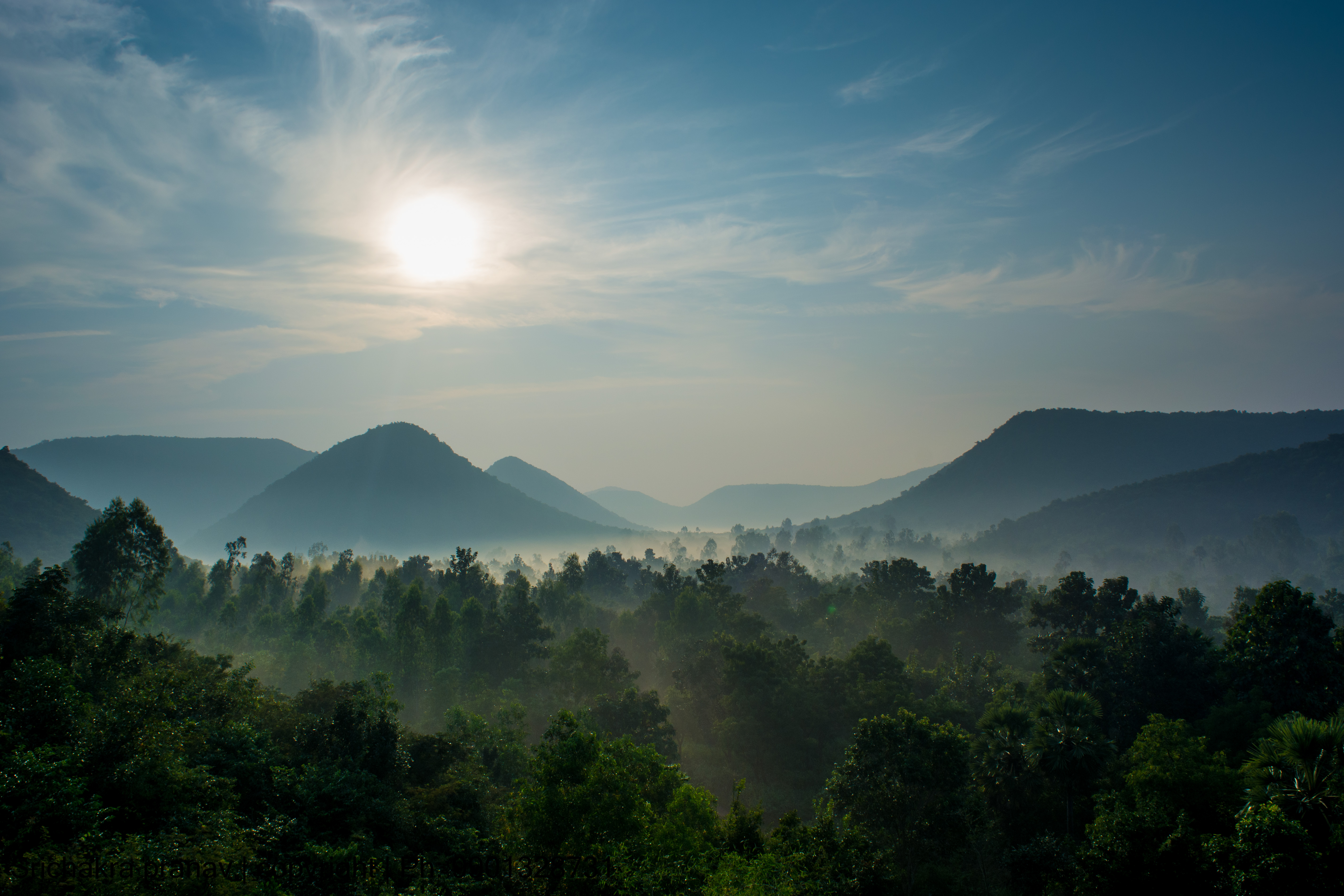
- Kambalakonda Wildlife Sanctuary morning view

- Location within Andhra Pradesh Location within India
- Interactive map of Kambalakonda Wildlife Sanctuary
- Location: Andhra Pradesh, India
- Nearest city: Visakhapatnam
- Coordinates: 17°49′31″N 83°18′31″E
- Area: 70.70 km^{2} (17,470 acres)
- Established: 10 March 1970
- Governing body: Andhra Pradesh Forest Department

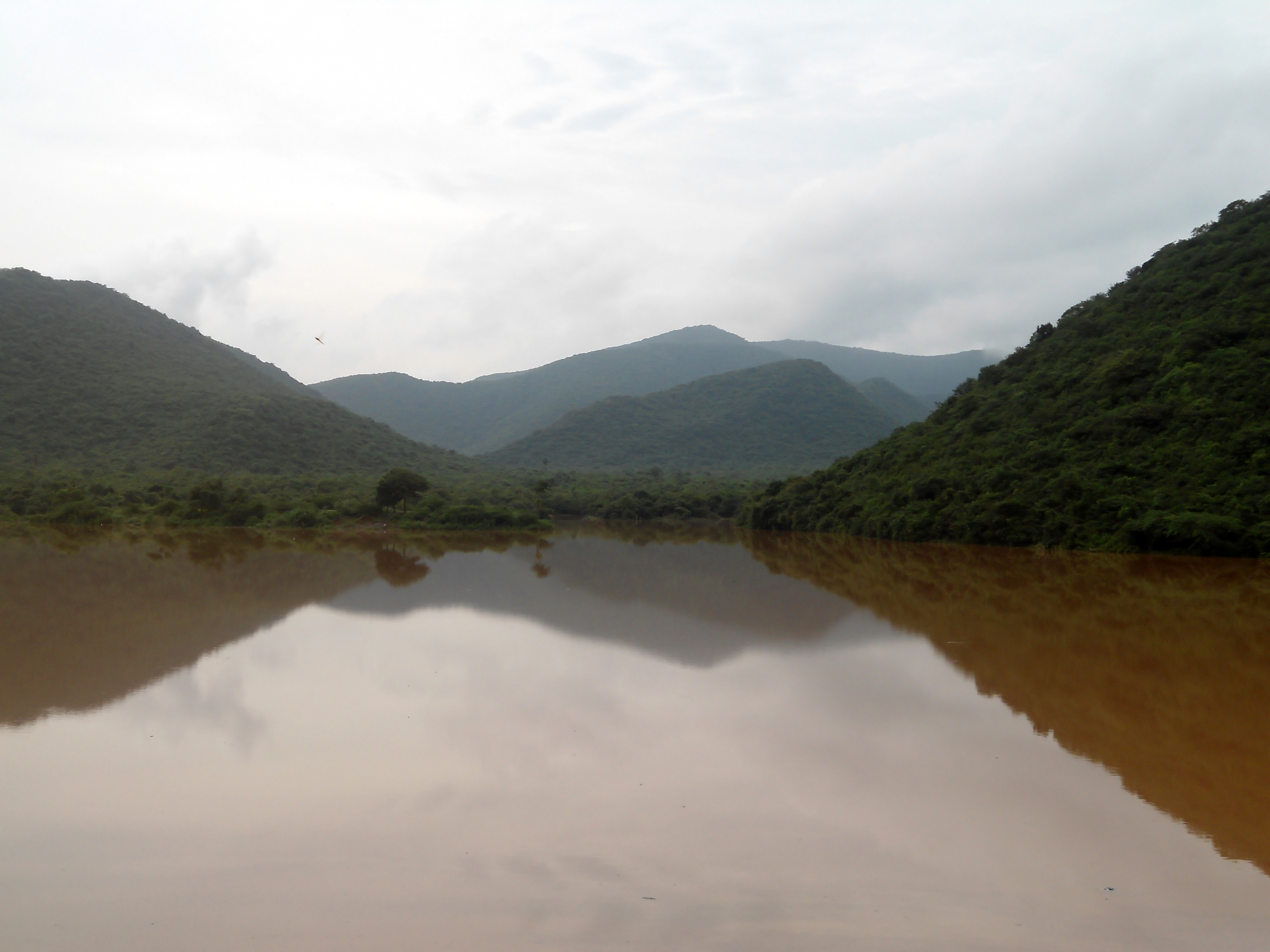
Eastern Ghats view in Kambalakonda Wildlife Sanctuary

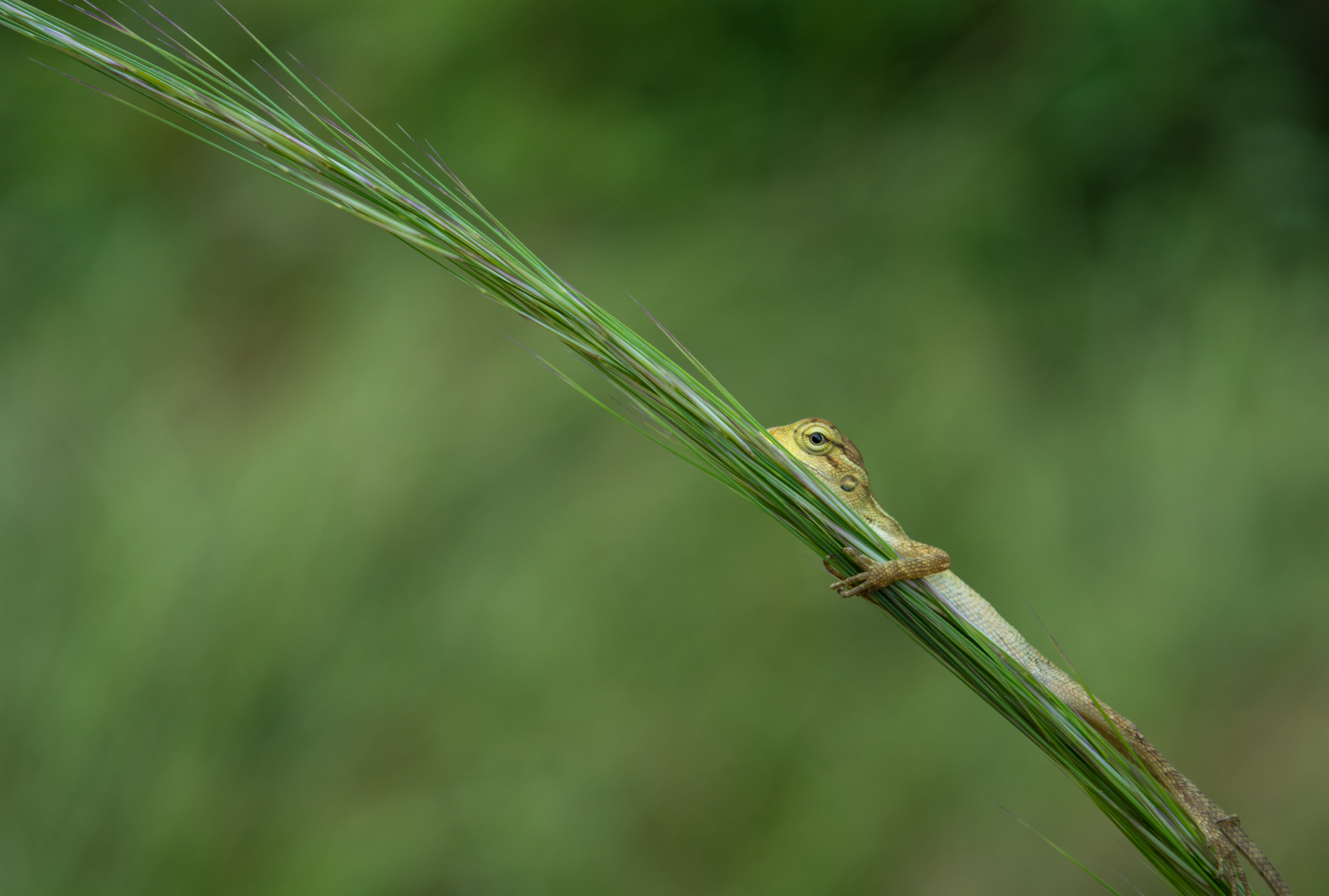
Calotes versicolor basking on grass at Kambalakonda

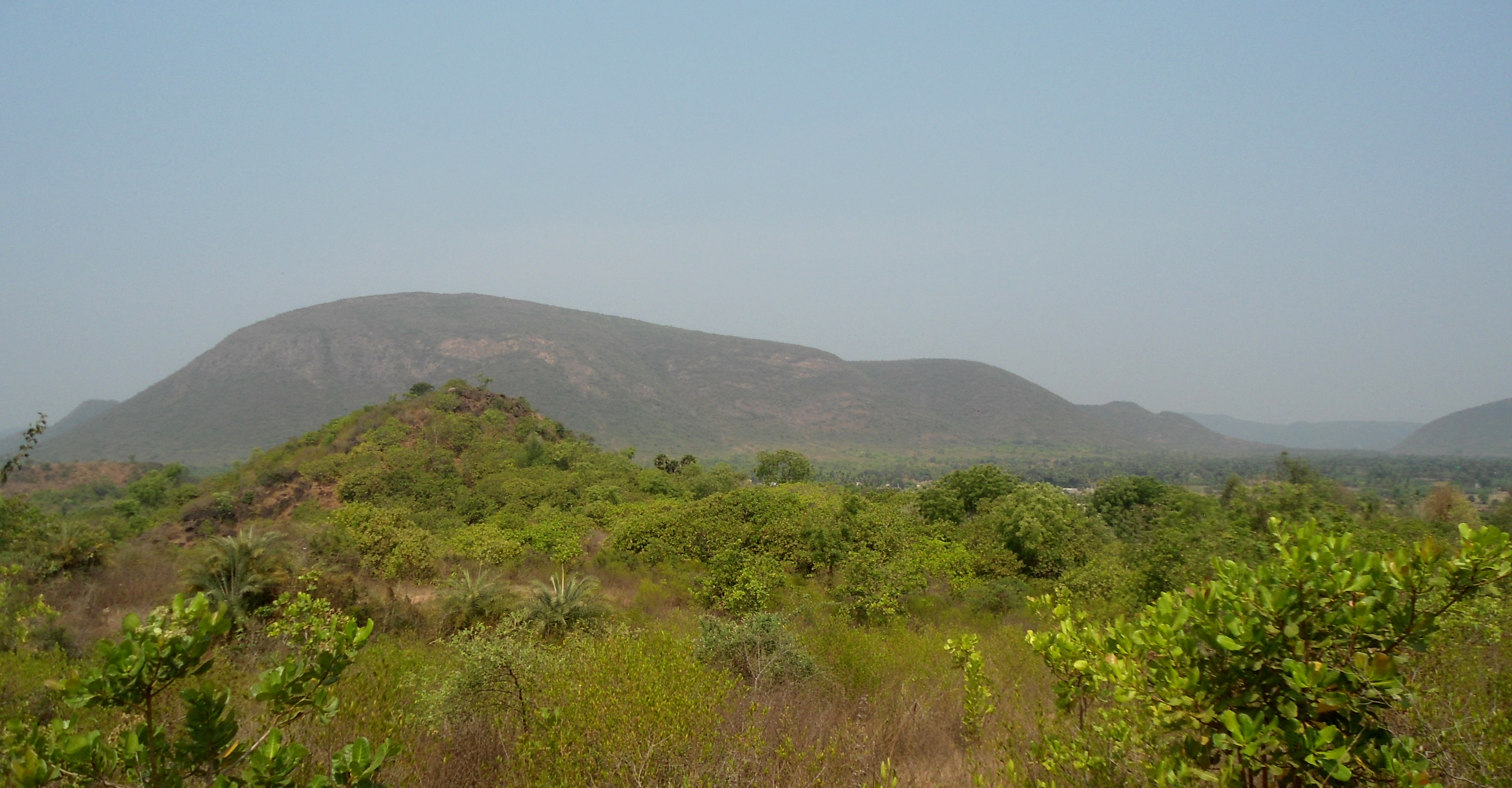
View of Kambalakonda Wildlife Sanctuary from Gudilova

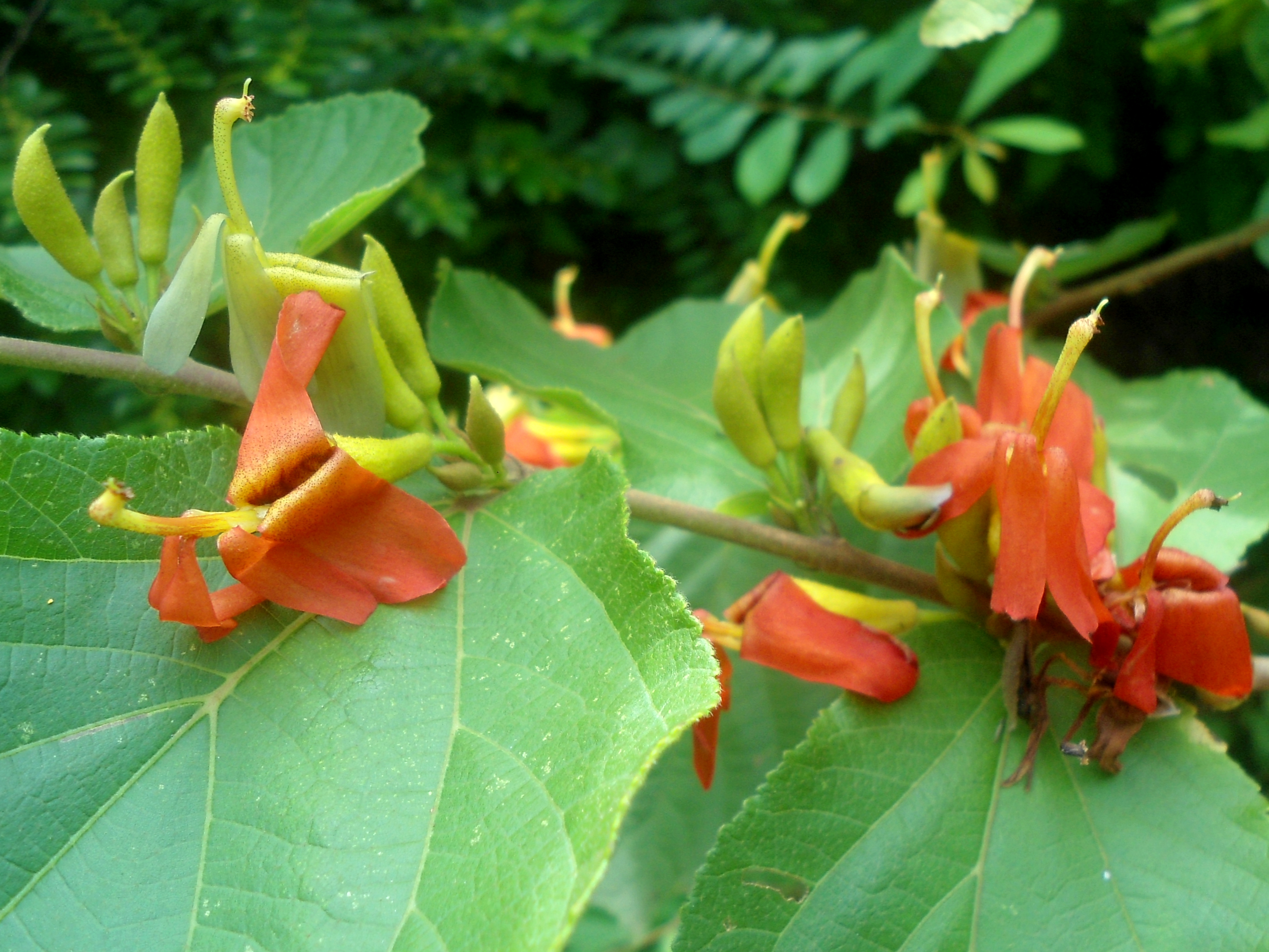
Helicteres isora (east Indian screw tree) at Kambalakonda

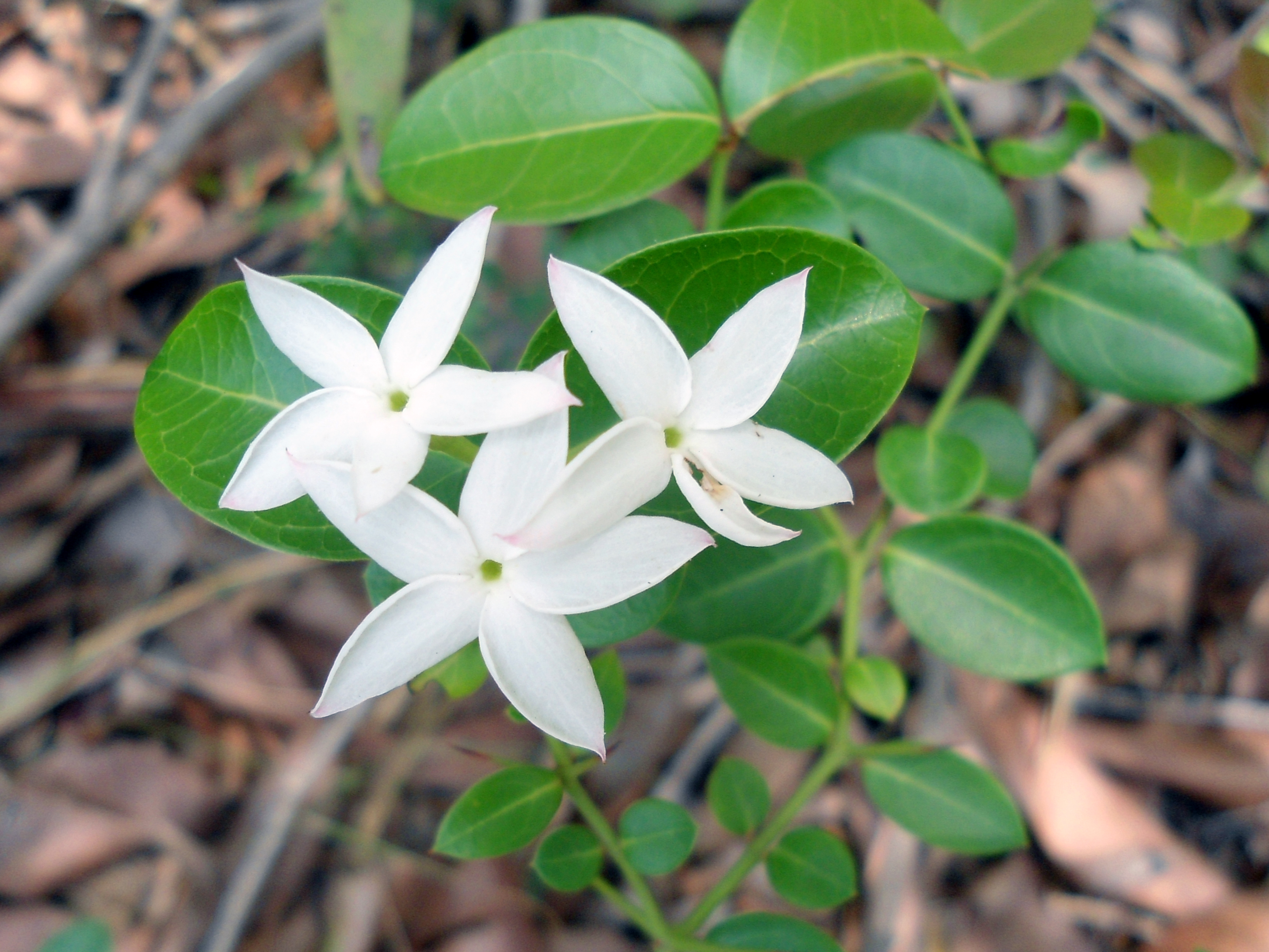
Carissa spinarum flowers at Kambalakonda

Polyalthia cerasoides red berries bunch at Kambalakonda

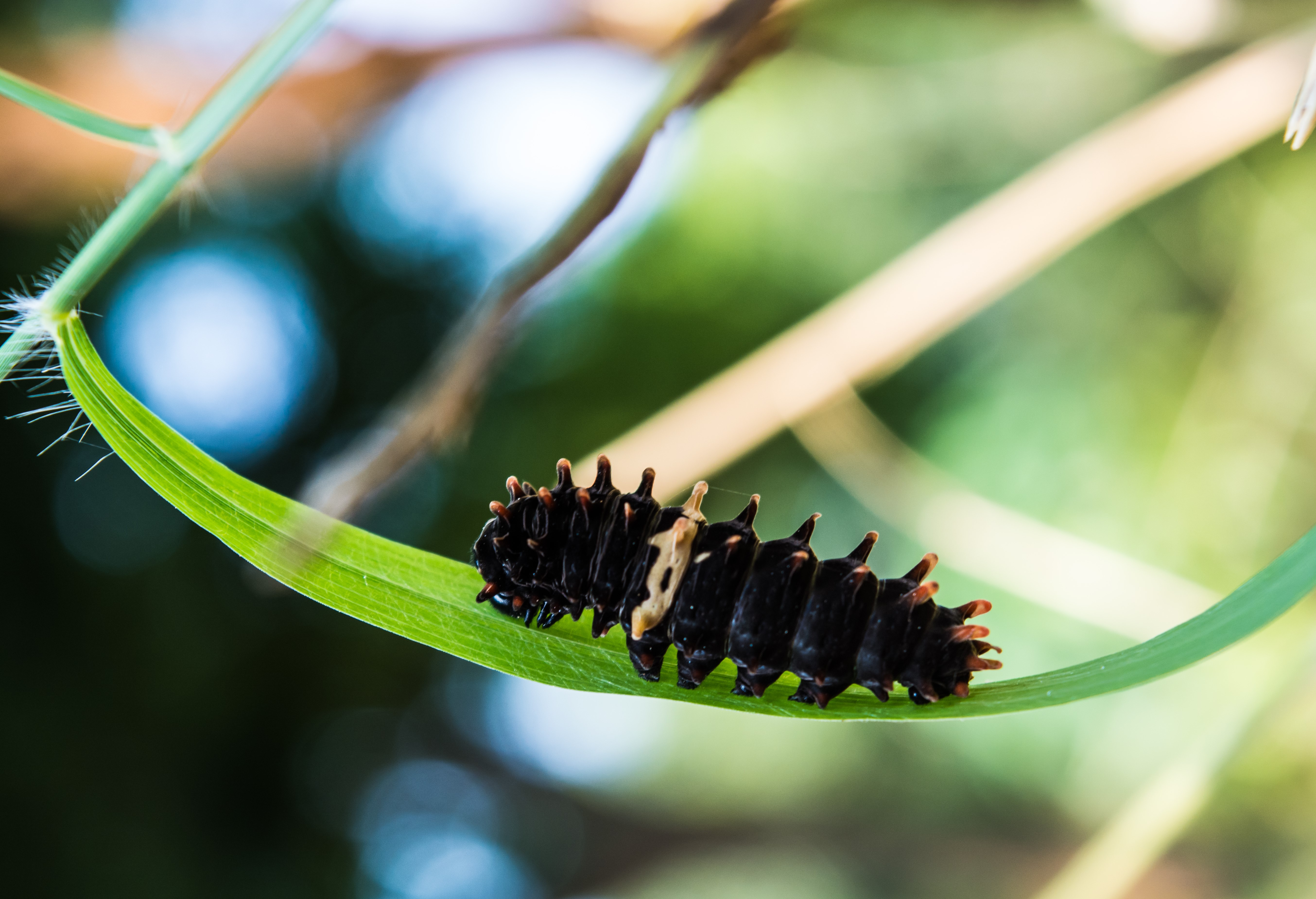
Pachliopta hector moving on grass leaf at Kambalakonda

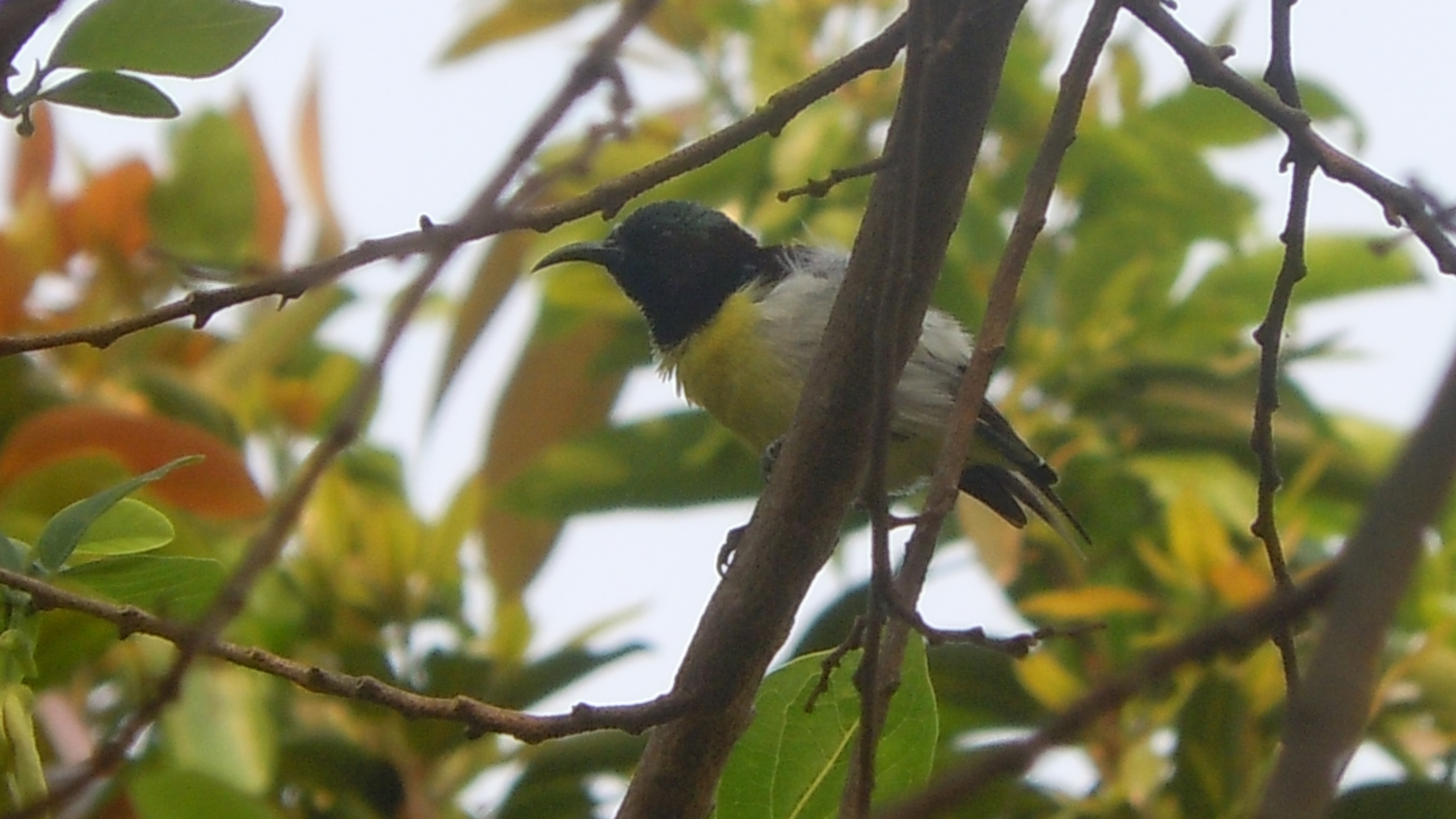
Purple-rumped sunbird (Leptocoma zeylonica)

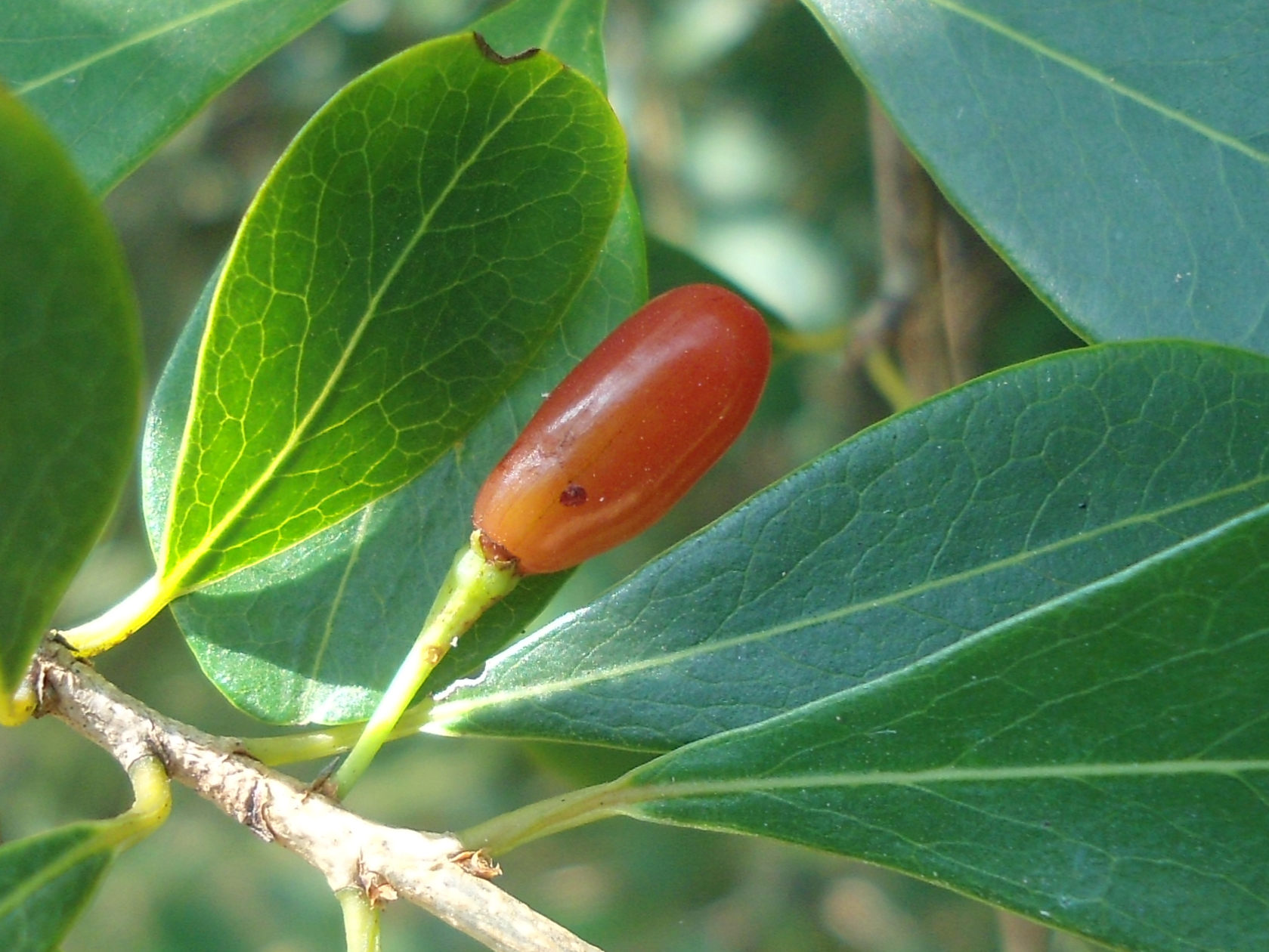
Red cedar fruit Erythroxylum monogynum at Kambalakonda

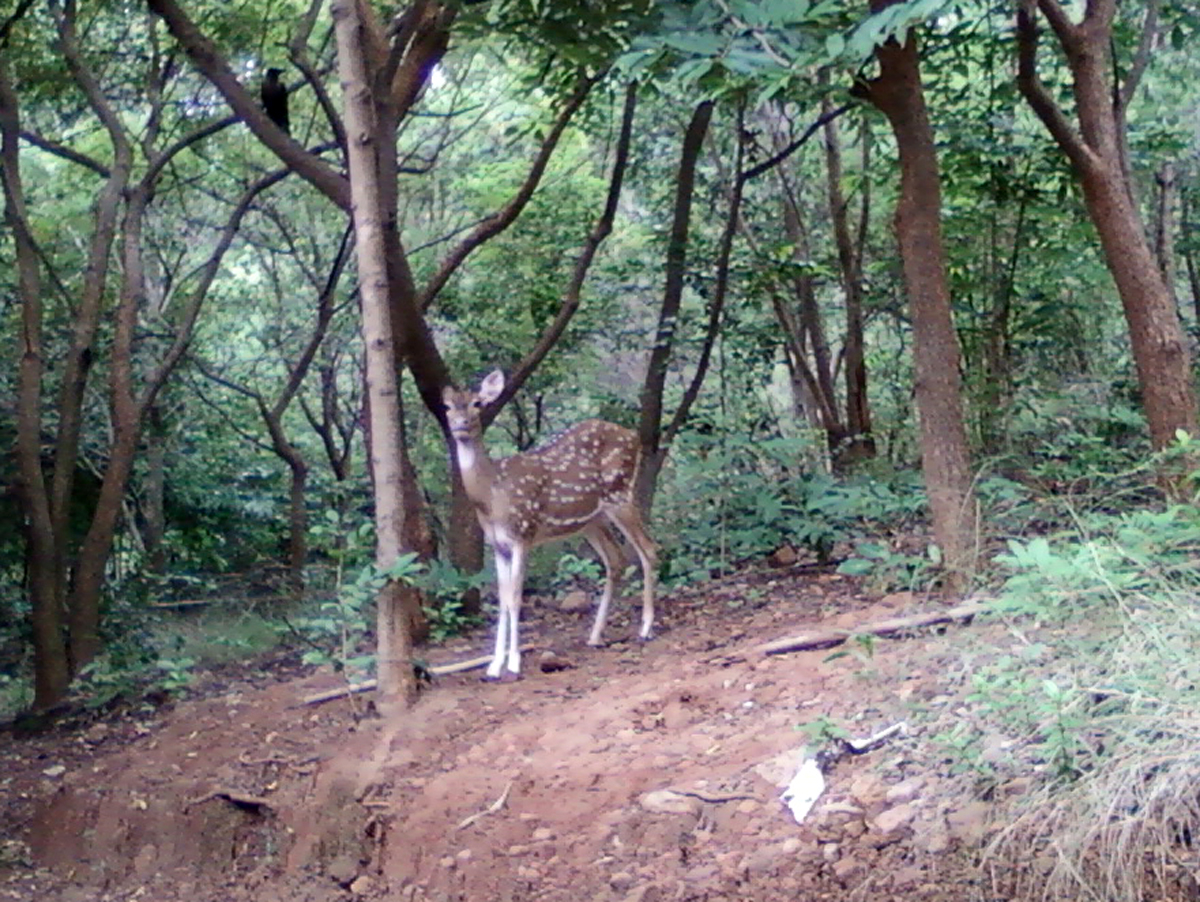
Axis axis (spotted deer) at Kambalakonda

The Kambalakonda Wildlife Sanctuary is a forest situated near Visakhapatnam. It has been under the control of Andhra Pradesh Forest Department since 10 March 1970. Earlier the land was under the control of Maharajah of Vizianagaram. It was named after the nearby hillock Kambalakonda. It is a dry evergreen forest mixed with scrub and meadows and covers an area of 70.70 square kilometers. The indicator species is the Indian leopard.

== Geography ==
The sanctuary is located from latitudes of 17.34° N to 17.47° N and longitudes of 83.04° E to 83.20° E. The location corresponds to an area west of National Highway 16 on the northern side of Visakhapatnam and Pendurthi in Visakhapatnam district. It can be reached by road about 3 km from Visakhapatnam, opposite to zoo park.

The sanctuary has a dry evergreen forest mixed with scrub and meadows. The terrain is hilly with steep slopes.

== Flora and fauna ==
=== Flora ===
There is diverse flora and fauna in this sanctuary representing the Eastern Ghats. Floral diversity is high and includes:

Common name	Formal name	Local name
Indian licorice	Abrus precatorius	గురువింద
Tree of Heaven	Ailanthus excelsa	పెదమాను
Sage-leaved alangium	Alangium salviifolium	ఊడుగ
Neem tree	Azadirachta indica	వేప
Indian thorny bamboo	Bambusa bambos	ముళ్ళవెదురు
Bidi leaf tree	Bauhinia racemosa	తెల్ల ఆరె
Mountain pomegranate	Catunaregam spinosa	మంగ
East Indian satinwood	Chloroxylon swietenia	బిల్లుడు
Buttercup tree	Cochlospermum religiosum	కొండగోగు
Golden shower tree	Cassia fistula	రేల
Bush plum tree	Carissa spinarum	వాక
Indian rosewood	Dalbergia sissoo	ఇరుగుడుసేవ
Banyan tree	Ficus benghalensis	మర్రి
Hairy fig tree	Ficus hispida	బొడ్డ
Indian fig tree	Ficus racemosa	మేడి
White fig tree	Ficus virens	జువ్వి
Indian boxwood	Gardenia latifolia	పెదకరింగ
Dhaman tree	Grewia tiliaefolia	తడ
White teak	Gmelina arborea	గుమ్మడి టేకు
Indian screw tree	Helicteres isora	నులి తడ
Indian ash tree	Lannea coromandelica	గుంపెన
Ironwood tree	Manilkara hexandra	పాల
Indian mulberry	Morinda tinctoria	తగర
Jungle berry	Polyalthia cerasoides	దుద్దుగ
Dinnerplate tree	Pterospermum suberifolium	కనకచంపకం
Jamun tree	Syzygium cumini	నేరేడు
Red cutch tree	Senegalia chundra	చండ్ర
Teak	Tectona grandis	టేకు
White babul	Vachellia leucophloea	తెల్లతుమ్మ
Indigo tree	Wrightia tinctoria	ఆంకుడు

=== Fauna ===
There is a varied fauna present in the sanctuary.

==== Mammals ====
Common name	Formal name	Observed
Indian muntjac	Muntiacus muntjak	Common
Indian spotted chevrotain	Moschiola indica	Common
Indian leopard	Panthera pardus fusca	Rare
Indian jackal	Canis aureus indicus	Rare
Indian wild dog	Cuon alpinus	Rare
Indian pangolin	Manis crassicaudata	Rare
Indian boar	Sus scrofa cristatus	Common
Indian crested porcupine	Hystrix indica	Common
Indian hare	Lepus nigricollis	Common
Rusty-spotted cat	Prionailurus rubiginosus	Rare
Jungle cat	Felis chaus	Common
Madras treeshrew	Anathana ellioti	Rare
Ruddy mongoose	Herpestes smithii	Common
Sambar deer	Rusa unicolor	Common
Spotted deer	Axis axis	Common
Asian palm civet	Paradoxurus hermaphroditus	Common

==== Reptiles ====
Common name	Formal name	Observed
Indian python	Python molurus	Rare
Rat snake	Ptyas mucosus	Common
Indian cobra	Naja naja	Common
Common Indian bronzeback	Dendrelaphis tristis	Common
Common Asian vine snake	Ahaetulla nasuta	Rare
Russell's viper	Daboia russelii	Rare
Indian chameleon	Chamaeleo zeylanicus	Common
Bengal monitor	Varanus bengalensis	Common
Visakhapatnam limbless skink	Barkudia melanosticta	Rare

==== Birds ====
Common name	Formal name	Observed
Indian paradise flycatcher	Terpsiphone paradisi	Common
Rufous treepie	Dendrocitta vagabunda	Common
Black drongo	Dicrurus macrocercus	Common
Indian golden oriole	Oriolus kundoo	Rare
Indian peafowl	Pavo cristatus	Rare
Grey francolin	Francolinus pondicerianus	Rare
Laughing dove	Spilopelia senegalensis	Common
Spotted dove	Spilopelia chinensis	Common
Red-wattled lapwing	Vanellus indicus	Common
Rose-ringed parakeet	Psittacula krameri	Common
Pied crested cuckoo	Clamator jacobinus	Common
Eastern barn owl	Tyto javanica	Rare
Spotted owlet	Athene brama	Common
Green bee-eater	Merops orientalis	Common
Indian grey hornbill	Ocyceros birostris	Rare
Indian roller	Coracias benghalensis	Common
Red-whiskered bulbul	Pycnonotus jocosus	Common
Indian robin	Copsychus fulicatus	Common
Baya weaver	Ploceus philippinus	Common
White wagtail	Motacilla alba	Common
Pied kingfisher	Ceryle rudis	Common
Banded bay cuckoo	Cacomantis sonneratii	Rare
Purple-rumped sunbird	Nectarinia zeylonica	Common
Painted spurfowl	Galloperdix lunulata	Rare
White-bellied sea eagle	Haliaeetus leucogaster	Rare

==== Butterflies ====
Common name	Formal name	Observed
Lemon pansy	Junonia lemonias	Common
Anomalous nawab	Charaxes agraria	Common
Indian sunbeam	Curetis thetis	Common
Plain tiger	Danaus chrysippus	Common
Peacock pansy	Junonia almana	Rare
Common banded peacock	Papilio crino	Rare
Great eggfly	Hypolimnas bolina	Common
Common crow	Euploea core	Common
Danaid eggfly	Hypolimnas misippus	Common
Lime swallowtail	Papilio demoleus	Common
Blue tiger	Tirumala limniace	Common
Common Mormon	Papilio polytes	Common
Mottled emigrant	Catopsilia pyranthe	Common
Common jay	Graphium doson	Common
Dark grass blue	Zizeeria karsandra	Common
Common gull	Cepora nerissa	Common
Monkey puzzle	Rathinda amor	Common
Common pierrot	Castalius rosimon	Common
Baronet	Euthalia nais	Rare

== Gallery ==
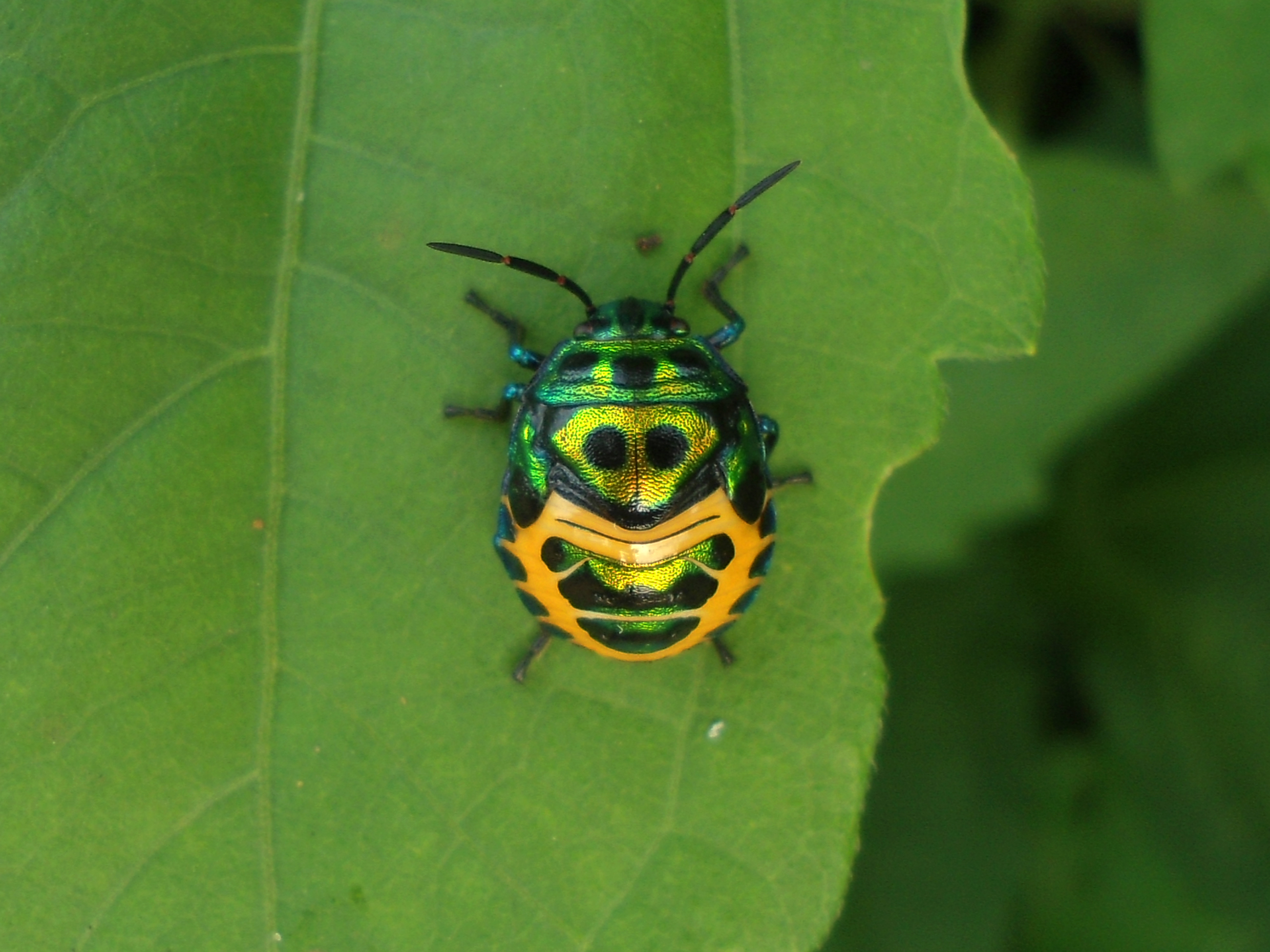
Pentatomid nymph at Kambalakonda, Visakhapatnam

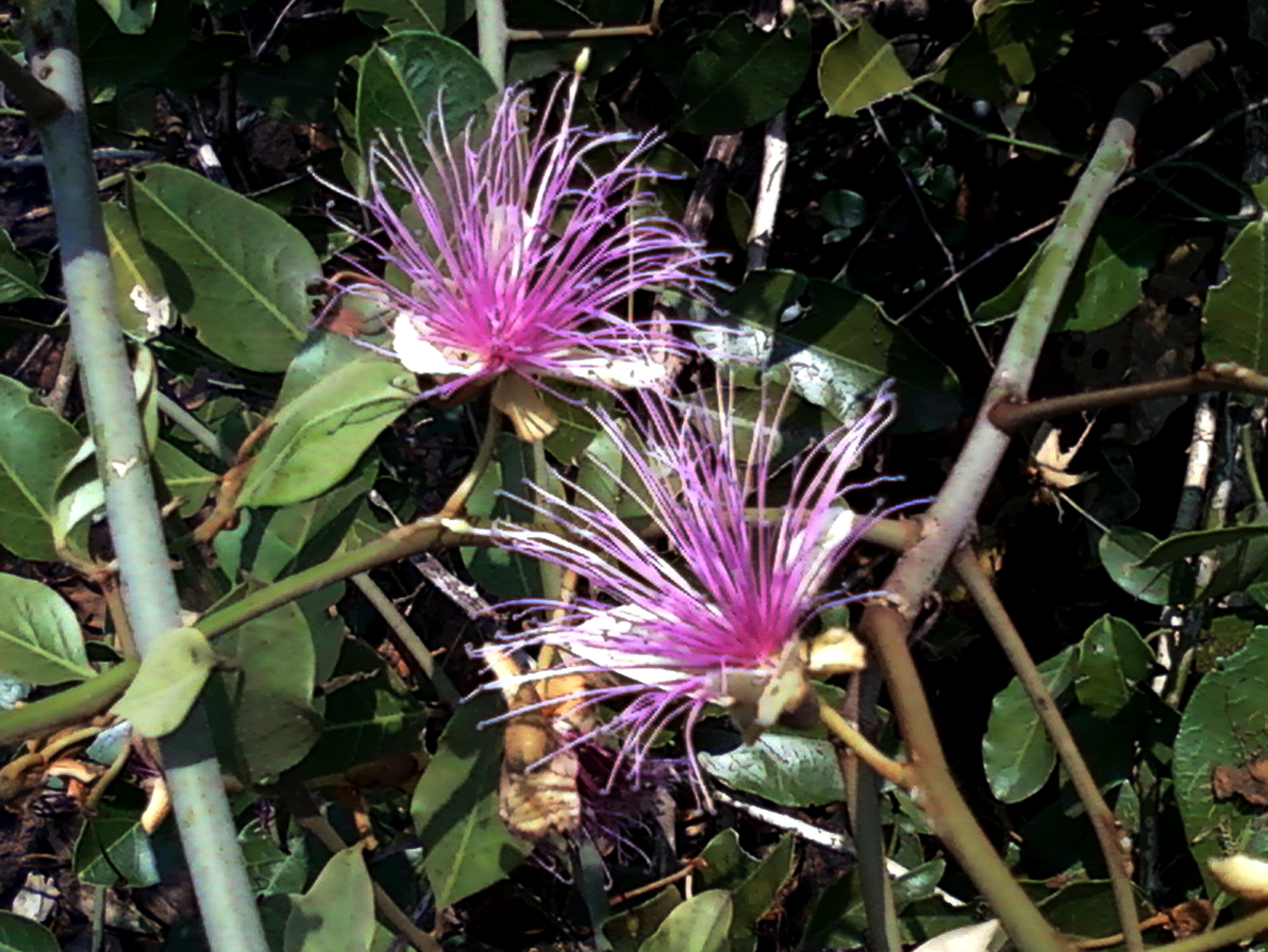
Capparis zeylanica shrub kambalakonda, Visakhapatnam

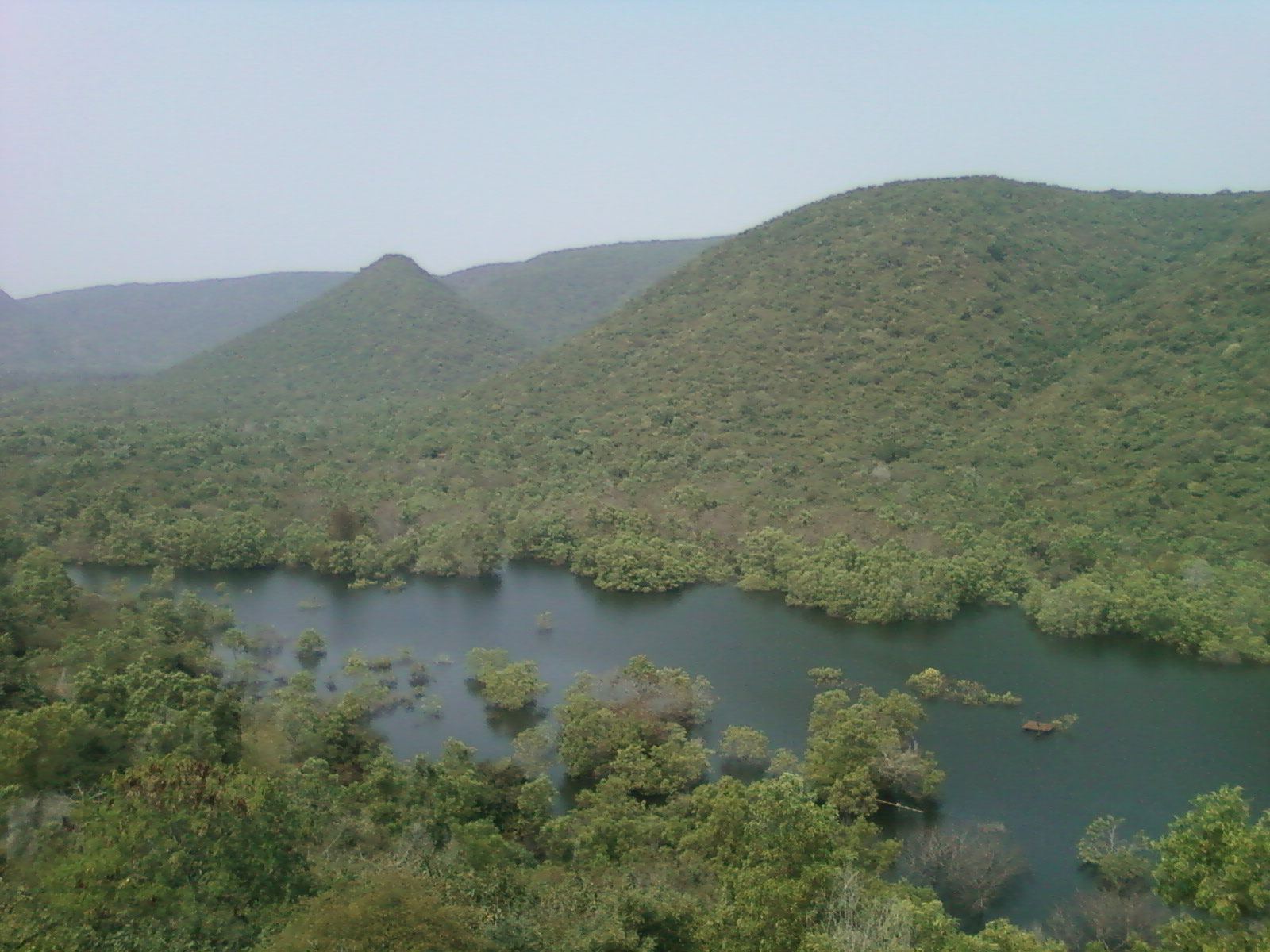
Kambalakonda Wildlife Sanctuary, Visakhapatnam

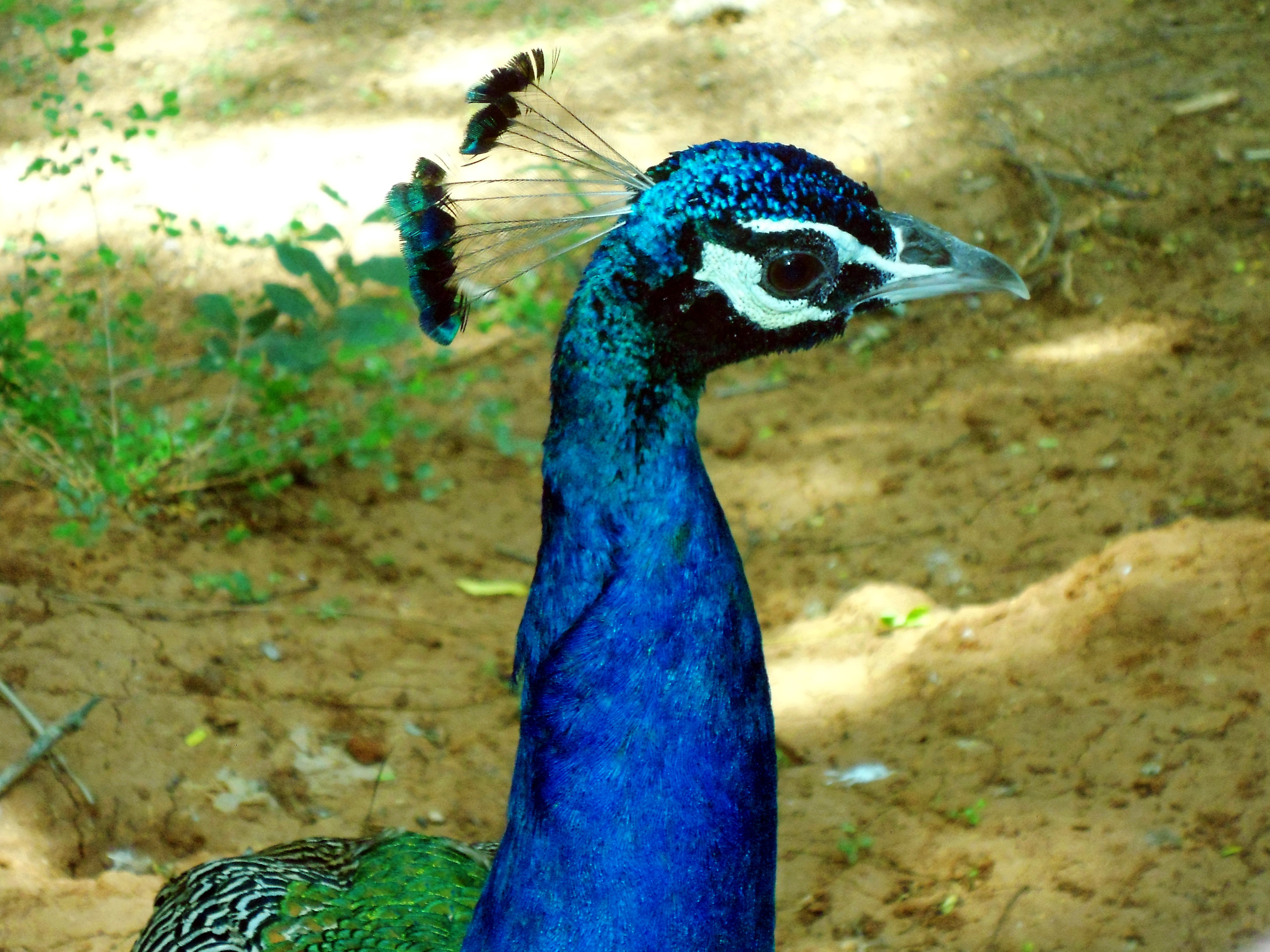
Indian peafowl at Kambalakonda, Visakhapatnam

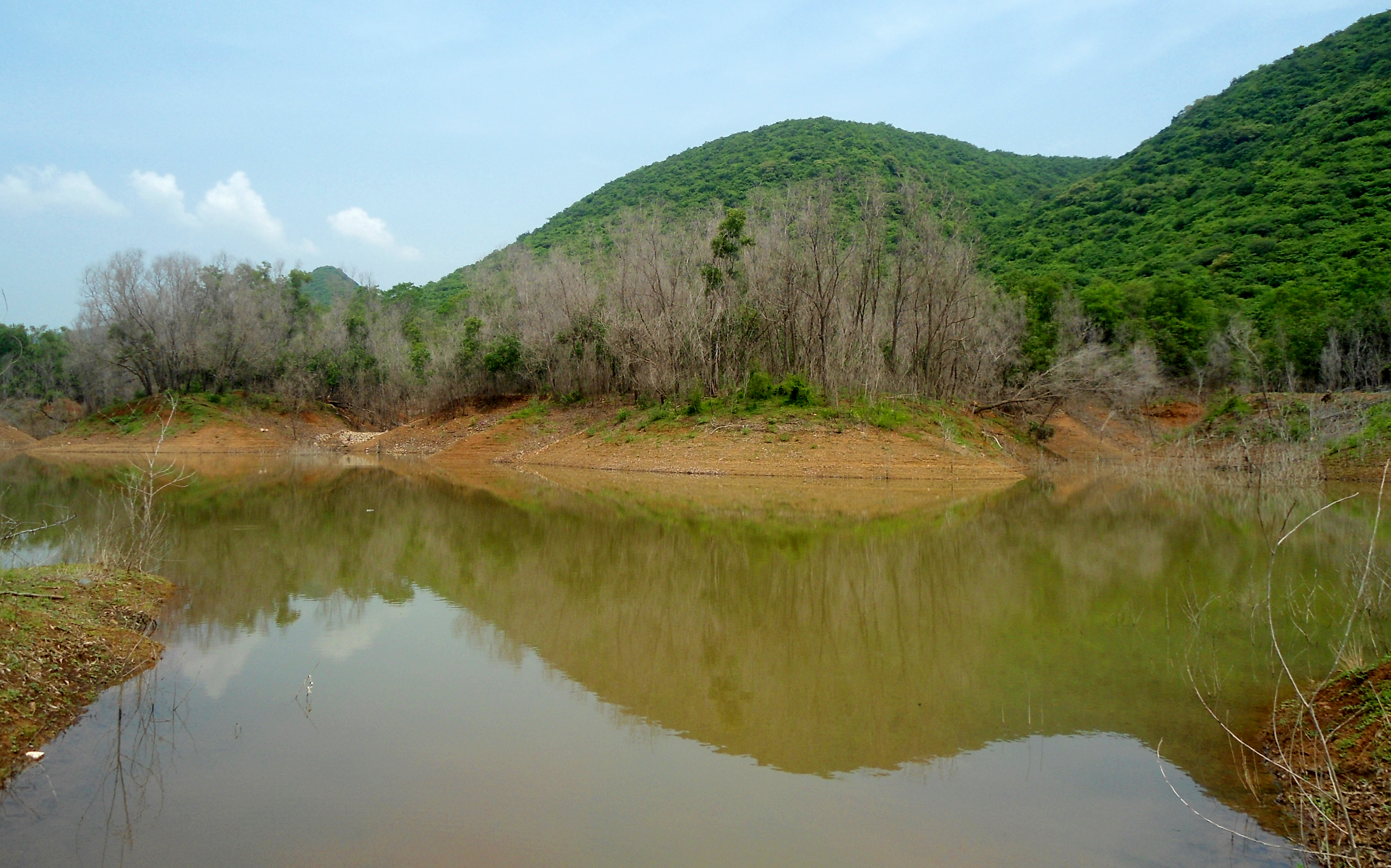
Reflections at Kambalakonda Wildlife Sanctuary

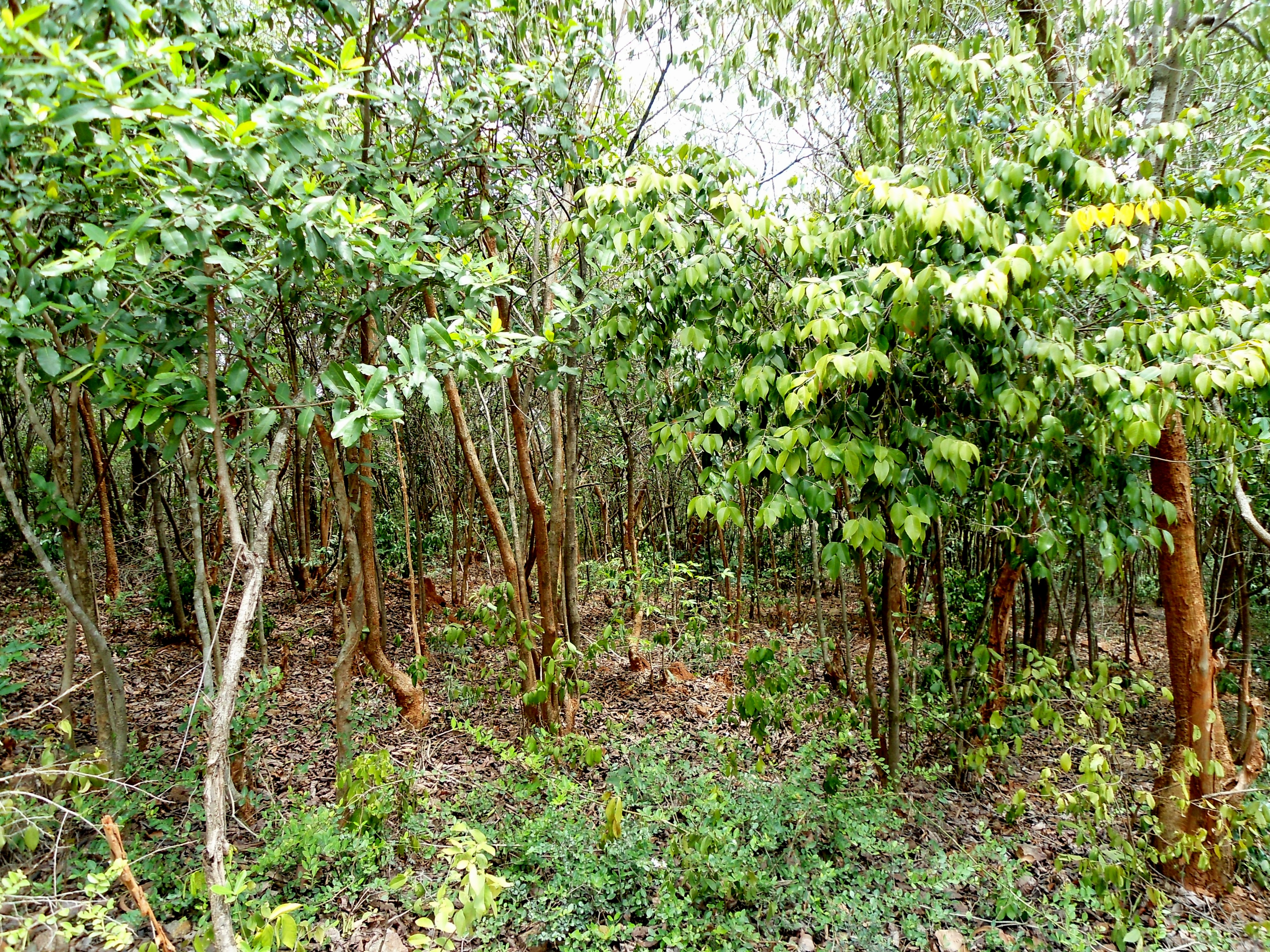
Forest at Kambalakonda Visakhapatnam

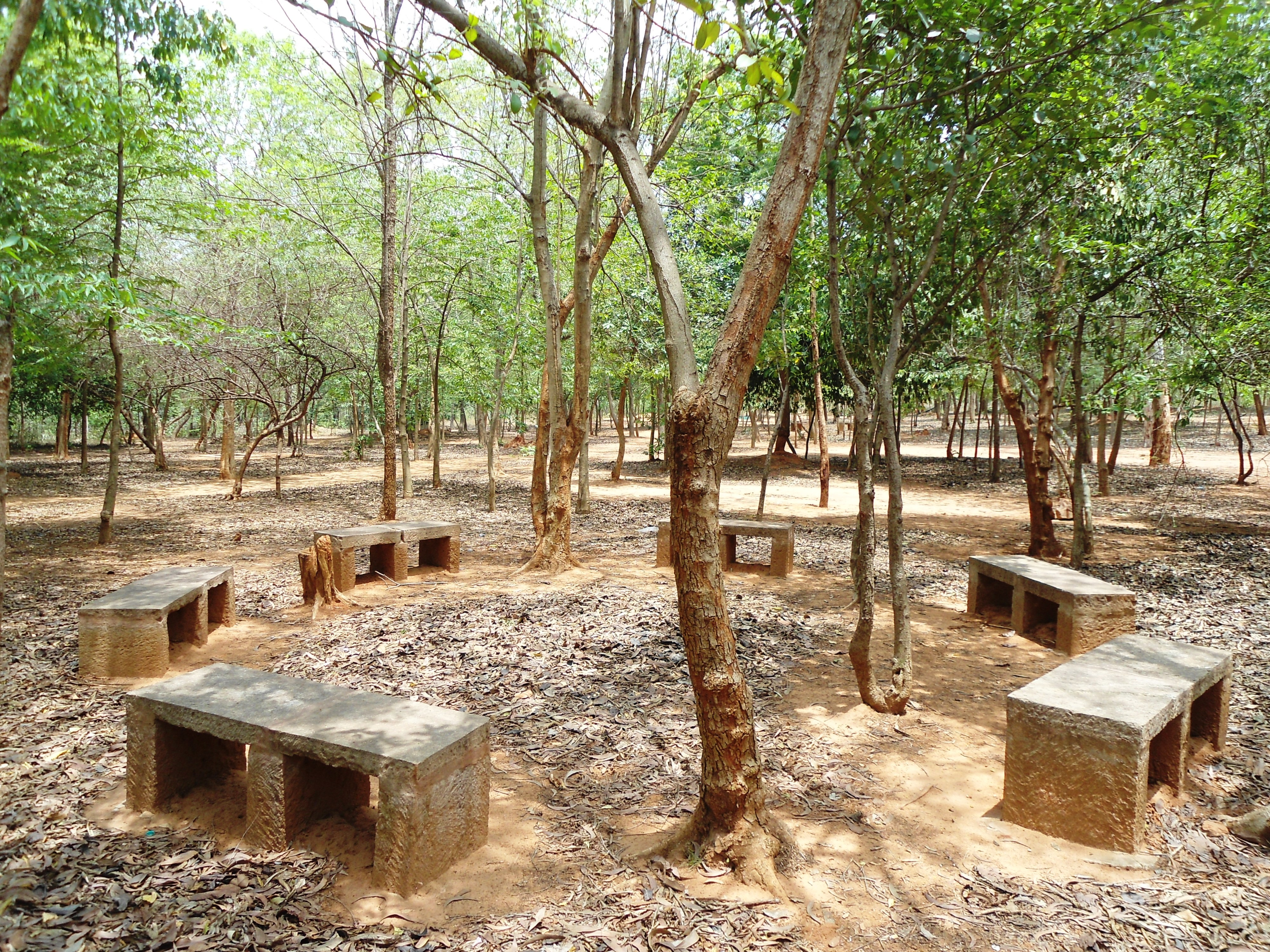
Rest area at Kambalakonda Ecopark

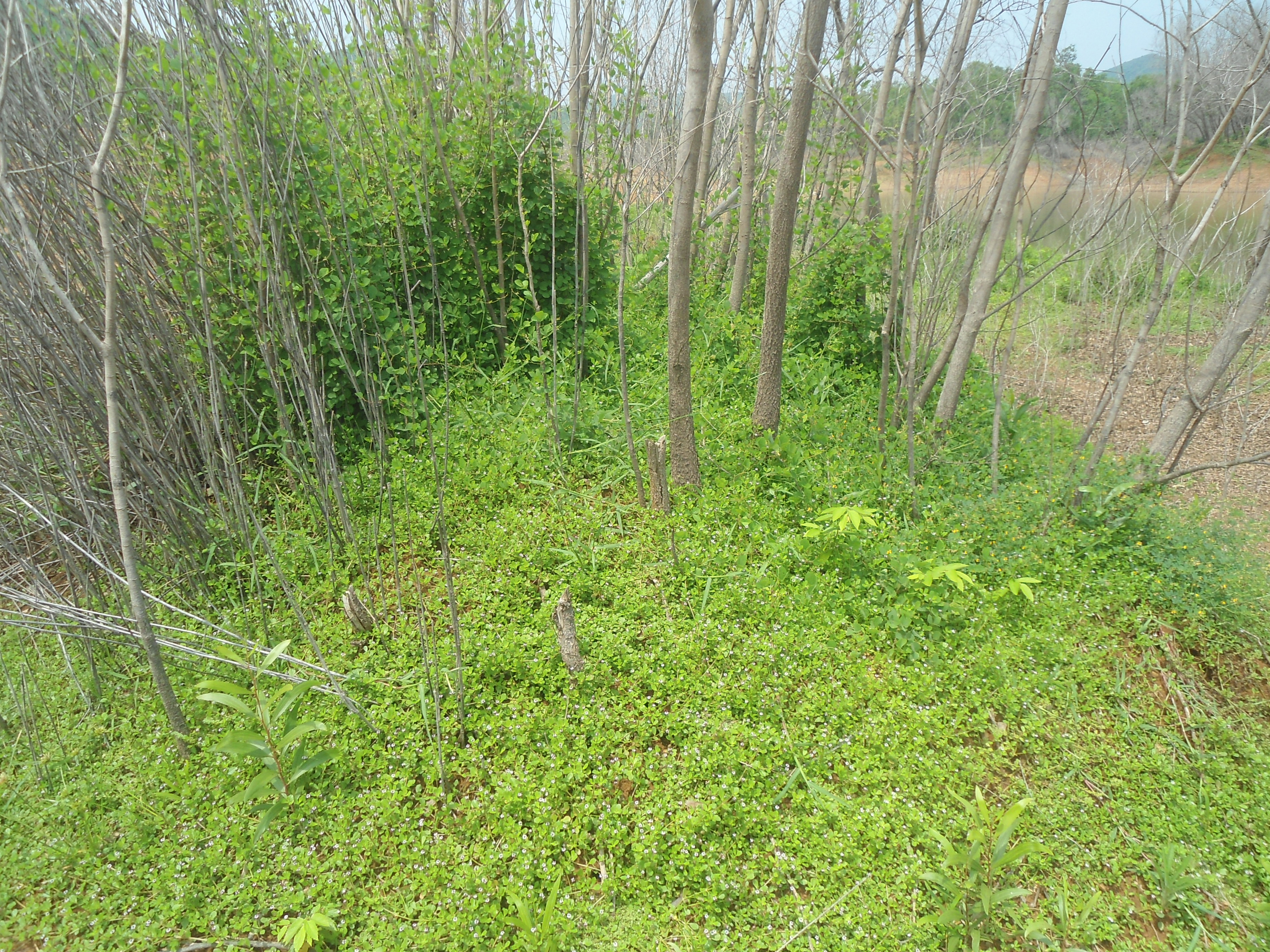
Greenery at Kambalakonda Eco Park

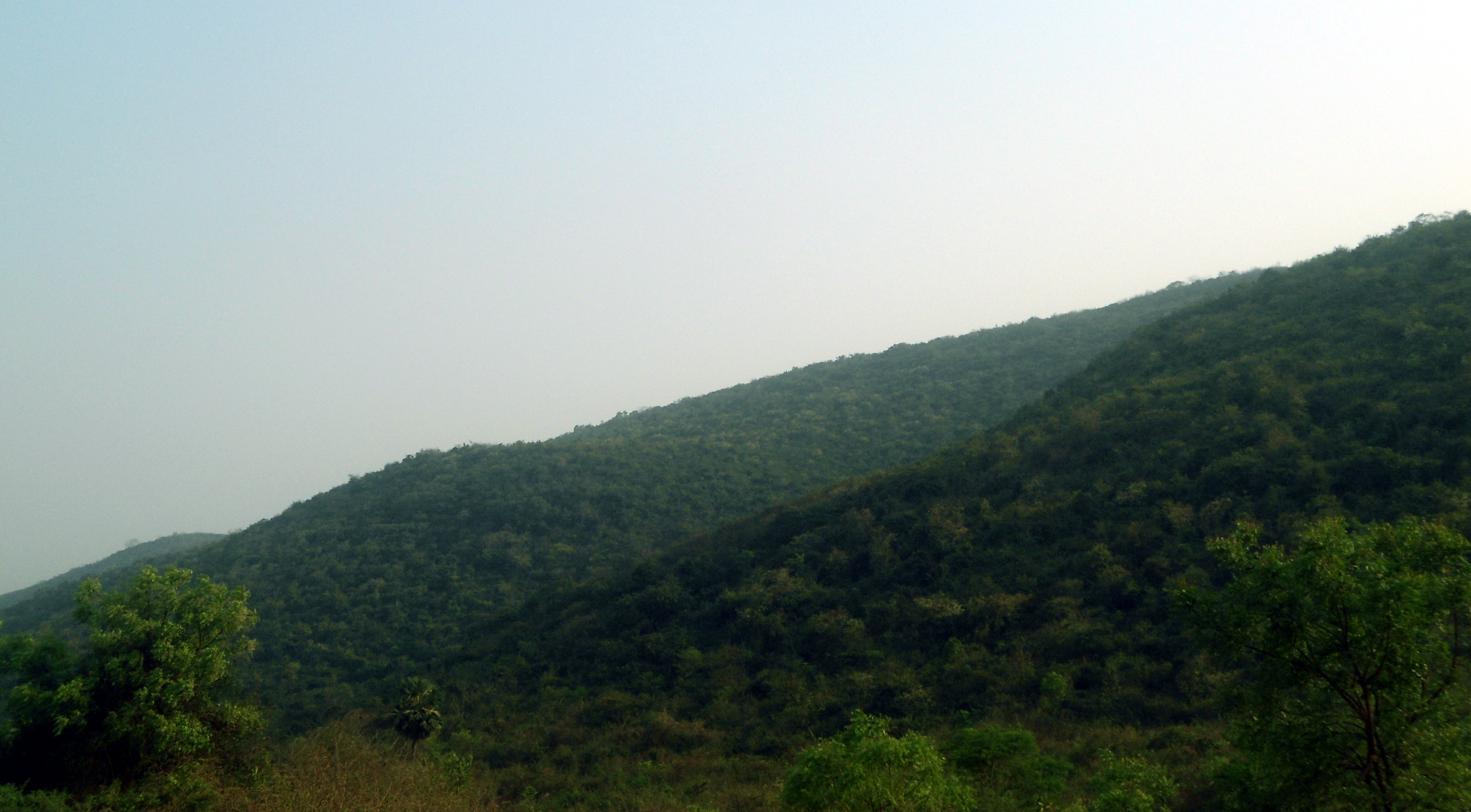
Eastern Ghats of Kambalakonda

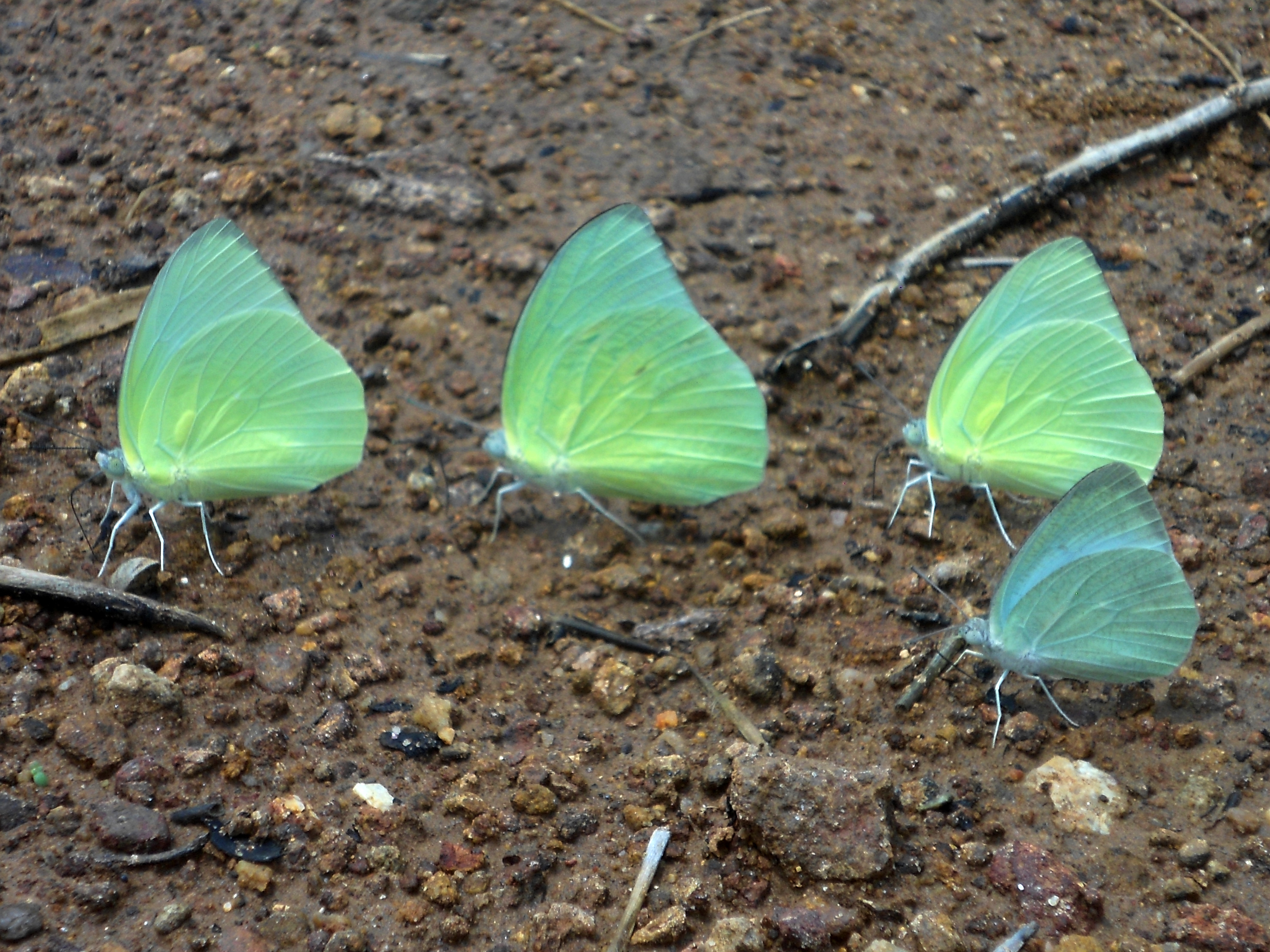
Mottled emigrant butterflies (Catopsilia pyranthe) at Kambalakonda

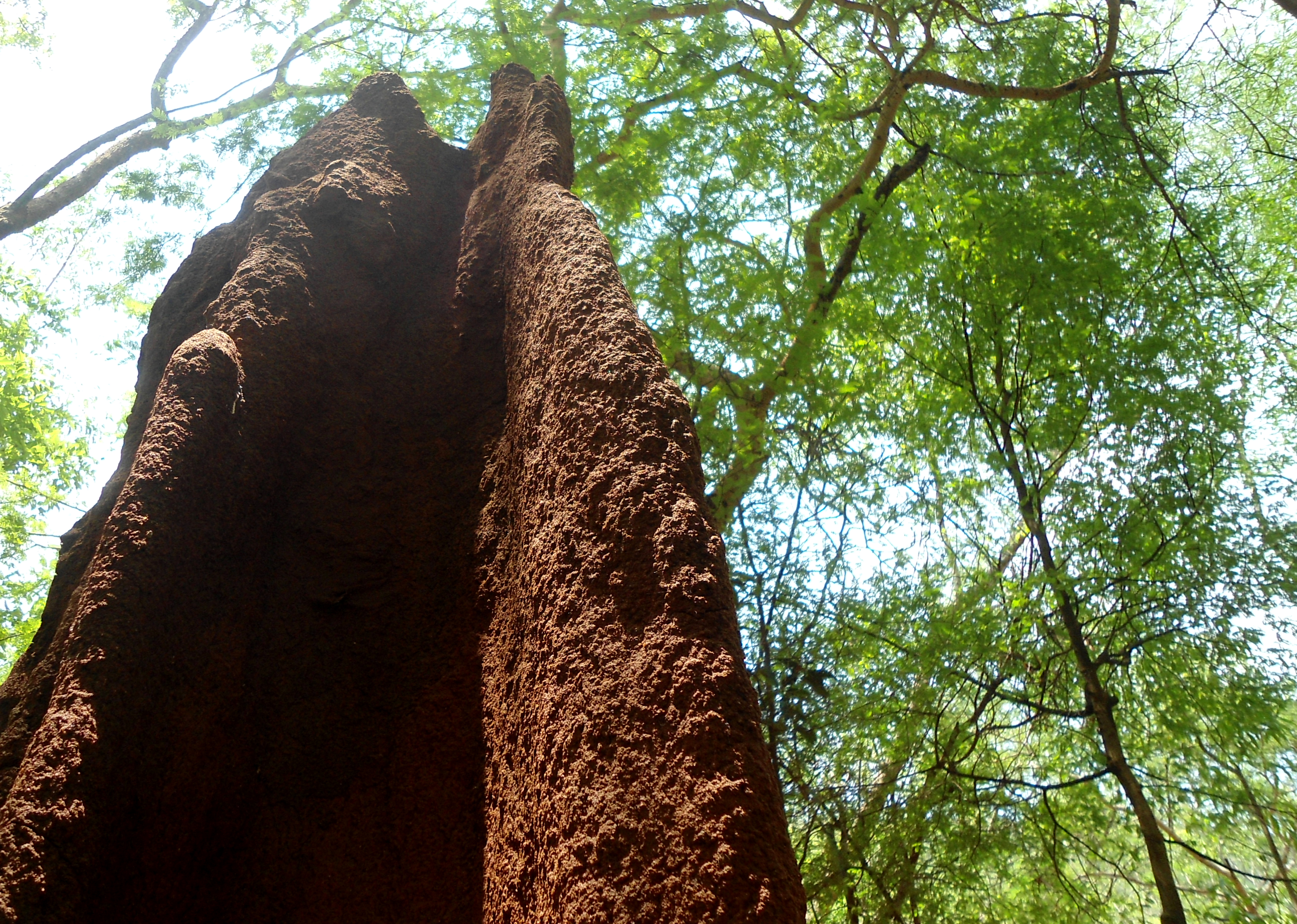
Huge anthill at Kambalakonda

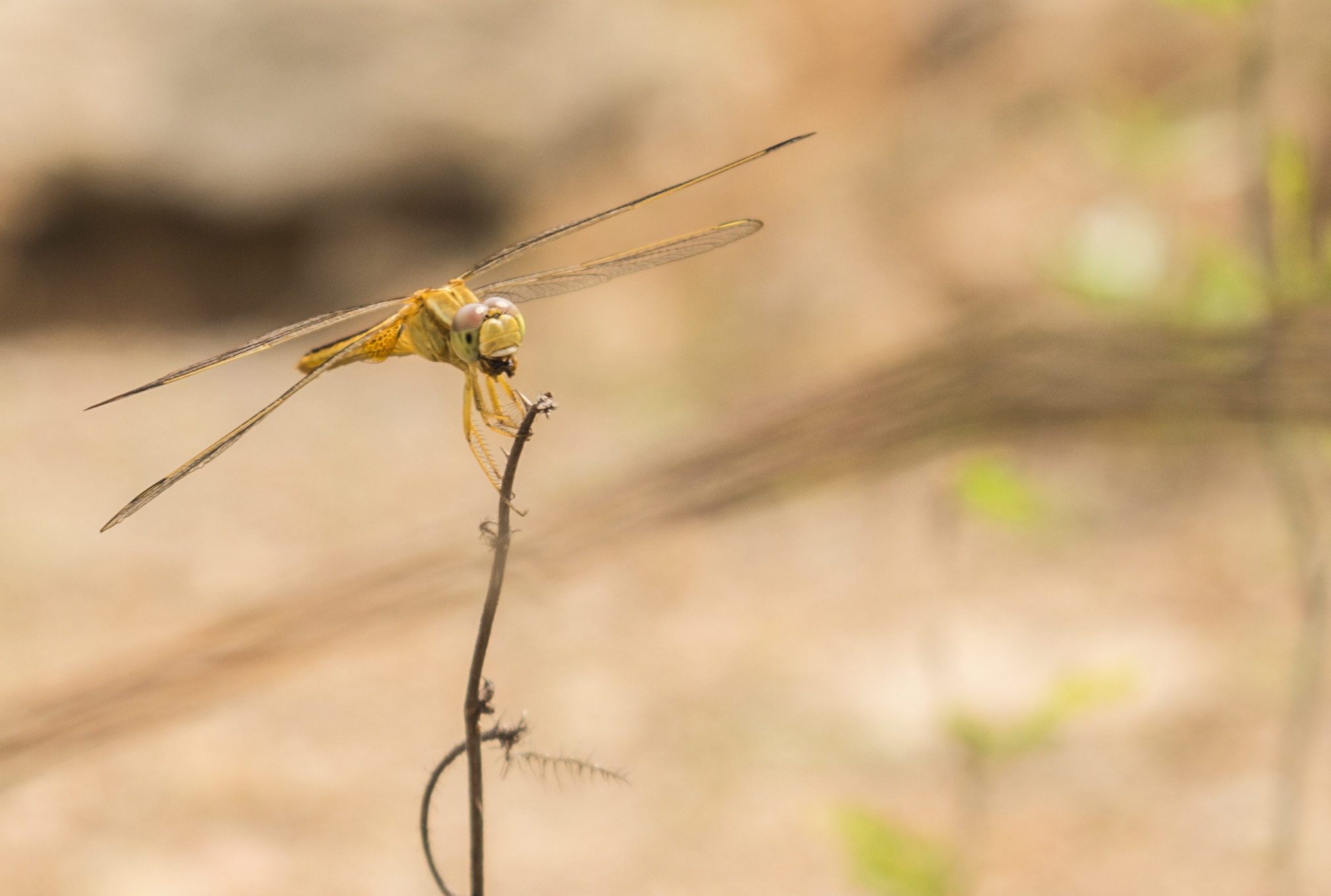
A dragon fly (helicopter) at Kambalakonda

== See also ==
- Andhra Pradesh Forest Department
- Dolphin Nature Conservation Society
