= Divi's Laboratories =

Indian pharmaceutical company pvt ltd

Divi's Laboratories Limited
- Divi's Laboratories' logo
- Formerly: Divi's Research Centre
- Type: Public
- Traded as: BSE: 532488; NSE: DIVISLAB
- ISIN: INE361B01024
- Industry: Pharmaceuticals
- Founded: 12 October 1990 (36 years ago)
- Headquarters: Divi Towers, Cyber Hills, Gachibowli, Hyderabad, Telangana, India
- Key people: Murali Krishna Prasad Divi (MD); Satchandra Kiran Divi (CEO)
- Products: Active Pharmaceutical Ingredients; Nutraceuticals
- Services: Custom synthesis
- Revenue: ▲₹9,712 crore (US$1.0 billion) (2025)
- Operating income: ▲₹2,916 crore (US$300 million) (2025)
- Net income: ▲₹2,194 crore (US$230 million) (2025)
- Total assets: ▲₹16,932 crore (US$1.8 billion) (2025)
- Total equity: ▲₹14,969 crore (US$1.6 billion) (2025)
- Owner: Divi Satchandra Kiran (20.34%); Nilima Motaparti (20.34%); Divi Swarna Latha (5.27%); Divis Biotech Private Limited (3.01%); Murali Krishna Prasad Divi (2.85%)
- Number of employees: 13,884 (2020)
- Subsidiaries: Divis Laboratories (USA) Inc; Divi’s Laboratories Europe AG; Divi’s Nutraceuticals
- Website: divislabs.com
- Footnotes; Financials as of 31 March 2025.

Divi's Laboratories Limited is an Indian multinational pharmaceutical company and producer of active pharmaceutical ingredients (APIs) and intermediates, headquartered in Hyderabad. The company manufactures and custom synthesizes generic APIs, intermediates. The company also manufactures and supplies nutraceutical ingredients through its subsidiary, Divi's Nutraceuticals. Divi's Laboratories is India's fourth largest publicly listed pharmaceutical company by market capitalization.

== History ==
The company initially started developing commercial processes for the manufacturing of APIs and intermediates. Divi's Research Centre changed its name to Divi's Laboratories Limited in 1994 to signal its intent to enter the API and intermediates manufacturing industry. Following this, the company established its first Manufacturing facility in 1995 at Choutuppal, Telangana. In 2002, the company's second manufacturing facility commenced operations at Chippada near Visakhapatnam.

The company went public with its initial public offering (IPO) on 17 February 2003. In 2010, the company established a research centre in Hyderabad.

== Facilities ==
The company has three manufacturing facilities and three R&D centres across India:

=== Manufacturing ===
- Choutuppal Unit - Lingojigudem village, Choutuppal mandal, Yadadri Bhuvanagiri district, Telangana
- DC SEZ Unit - Lingojigudem village, Choutuppal mandal, Yadadri Bhuvanagiri district, Telangana
- Export Oriented Unit - Chippada village, Bheemunipatnam mandal, Visakhapatnam district, Andhra Pradesh
- Divi's Pharma SEZ Unit - Chippada village, Bheemunipatnam mandal, Visakhapatnam district, Andhra Pradesh
- DSN SEZ Unit - Chippada village, Bheemunipatnam mandal, Visakhapatnam district, Andhra Pradesh
- DCV SEZ Unit - Chippada village, Bheemunipatnam mandal, Visakhapatnam district, Andhra Pradesh
