= Bheemunipatnam mandal =

Bheemunipatnam
- Mandal
- Interactive map of Bheemunipatnam
- Location in Andhra Pradesh, India
- Coordinates: 17.886385°N 83.447109°E
- Country: India
- State: Andhra Pradesh
- District: Visakhapatnam
- Founder: Government of Andhra Pradesh

Government
  - Type: Mayor-council
  - Body: Greater Visakhapatnam Municipal Corporation

Area
  - Total: 96.01 km^{2} (37.07 sq mi)

Languages
  - Official: Telugu
- Time zone: UTC+5:30 (IST)
- PIN: 531163
- Website: www.gvmc.gov.in

Bheemunipatnam mandal is one of the 46 mandals in Visakhapatnam District. It is under the administration of Bheemunipatnam revenue division and the headquarters is located at Bheemunipatnam. The Mandal is bounded by Padmanabham, Anandapuram mandals in Visakhapatnam District and Bhogapuram mandal in Vizianagaram District. It is a major Suburb and got merged in Greater Visakhapatnam Municipal Corporation. Organisations like INS Kalinga is located in this area.

== Towns and villages ==
As of 2011 census, Kapuluppada is the most populated and Ramayogi Agraharam is the least populated settlement in the mandal. The mandal consists of 26 settlements. It includes 1 town and 25 villages. Bheemunipatnam municipality was merged with Greater Visakhapatnam Municipal Corporation.

The settlements in the mandal are listed below:

1. Amanam
2. Annavaram, Bheemunipatnam
3. Bheemunipatnam† (GVMC part)
4. Bodamettapalem
5. Chepaluppada
6. Chippada
7. Chittivalasa
8. Dakamarri
9. J.V. Agraharam
10. K.V. Bhumulu
11. Kapuluppada
12. Kothavalasa, Bheemunipatnam
13. Kummaripualem
14. Majjipeta
15. Majjivalasa
16. Mulakuddu
17. Nagarapalem
18. Narayanarajupeta
19. Nerallavalasa
20. Nidigattu
21. Ramayogi Agrahram
22. Sangivalasa
23. Singanabanda
24. Tallavalasa
25. Tatituru
26. Thagarapuvalasa

Note: †–Mandal headquarter

== See also ==
- List of mandals in Andhra Pradesh
