= Shilparamam Jathara =

Coordinates: 17.805201°N 83.353244°E

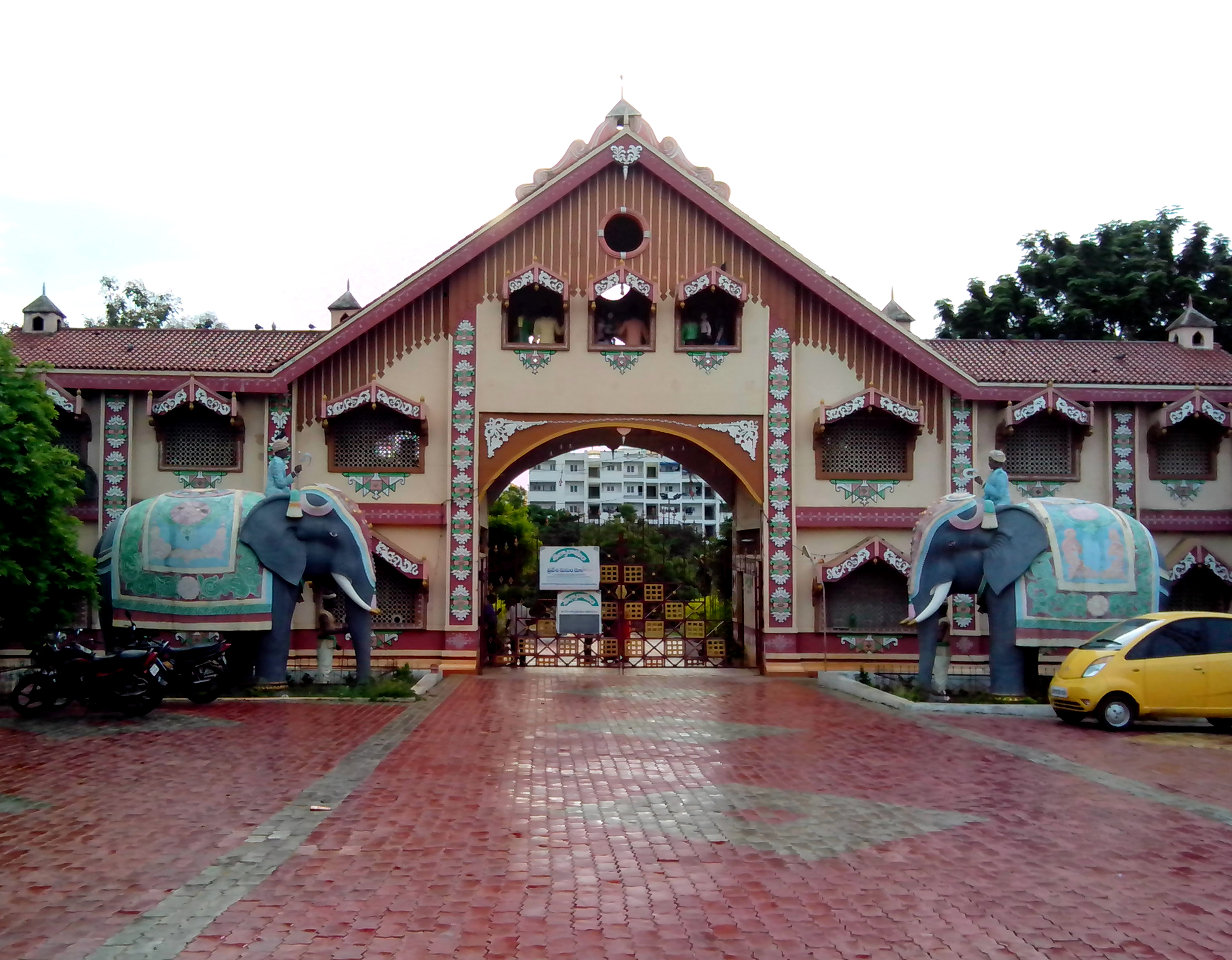

General information
- Type: Crafts village
- Architectural style: Ethnic
- Location: Madhurawada, Visakhapatnam, Andhra Pradesh, India
- Opened: 2009

Website
- webwonders.in/shilparamamap/Shilparamam__Vishakapatnam.html

Shilparamam Jathara is an arts and crafts village and Sculpture park located in Madhurawada, Visakhapatnam, India. The village was conceived with an idea to create an environment for the preservation of traditional crafts. There are ethnic festivals throughout the year.

Shilparamam was founded in the year 2009 by the state government. It is situated a few kilometers from the city of Visakhapatnam. Sprawling over 28 acres (110,000 m^{2}) of land in the Madhurawada, Shilparamam's main purpose is to show traditional culture to the wider population.

Shilparamam is located in a natural area sculpted with woodwork, jewelry, clothes and local crafts of each region of the country. Most of the artwork showcased comes from rural areas.

== Main Attractions ==
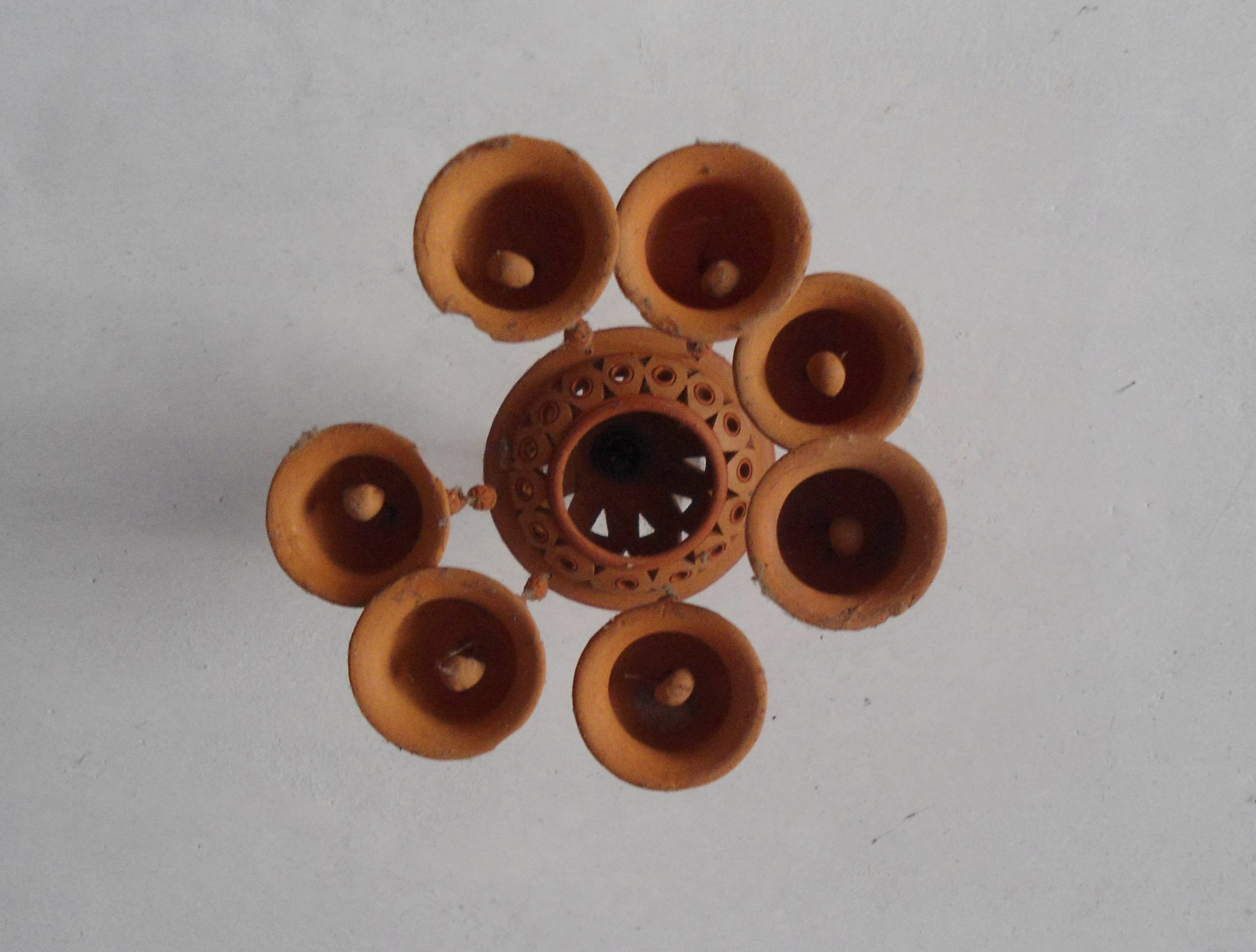
art models at Shilparamam in Visakhapatnam

=== Stalls ===
There are 36 stalls. Each stall provides a variety of traditional produce.

=== Jogging Track ===
A jogging track is also available and it is useful for morning walkers because it has a lush green environment.

=== Bird Enclosure ===
One of the major attractions is the Bird Enclosure with different type of birds, including Indian and international birds.

=== Amphitheatre ===
Amphitheater has a total capacity of 1000 members. There are many cultural activities conducted at the amphitheater.

=== Sculpture Park ===
The Sculpture Park is one of the main attraction of Shilparamam. It showcases artists' handmade sculptures.

=== Night Bazaar ===
A night bazaar was developed in 2014. It allows visitors to shop for food and entertainment.

== Photo gallery ==
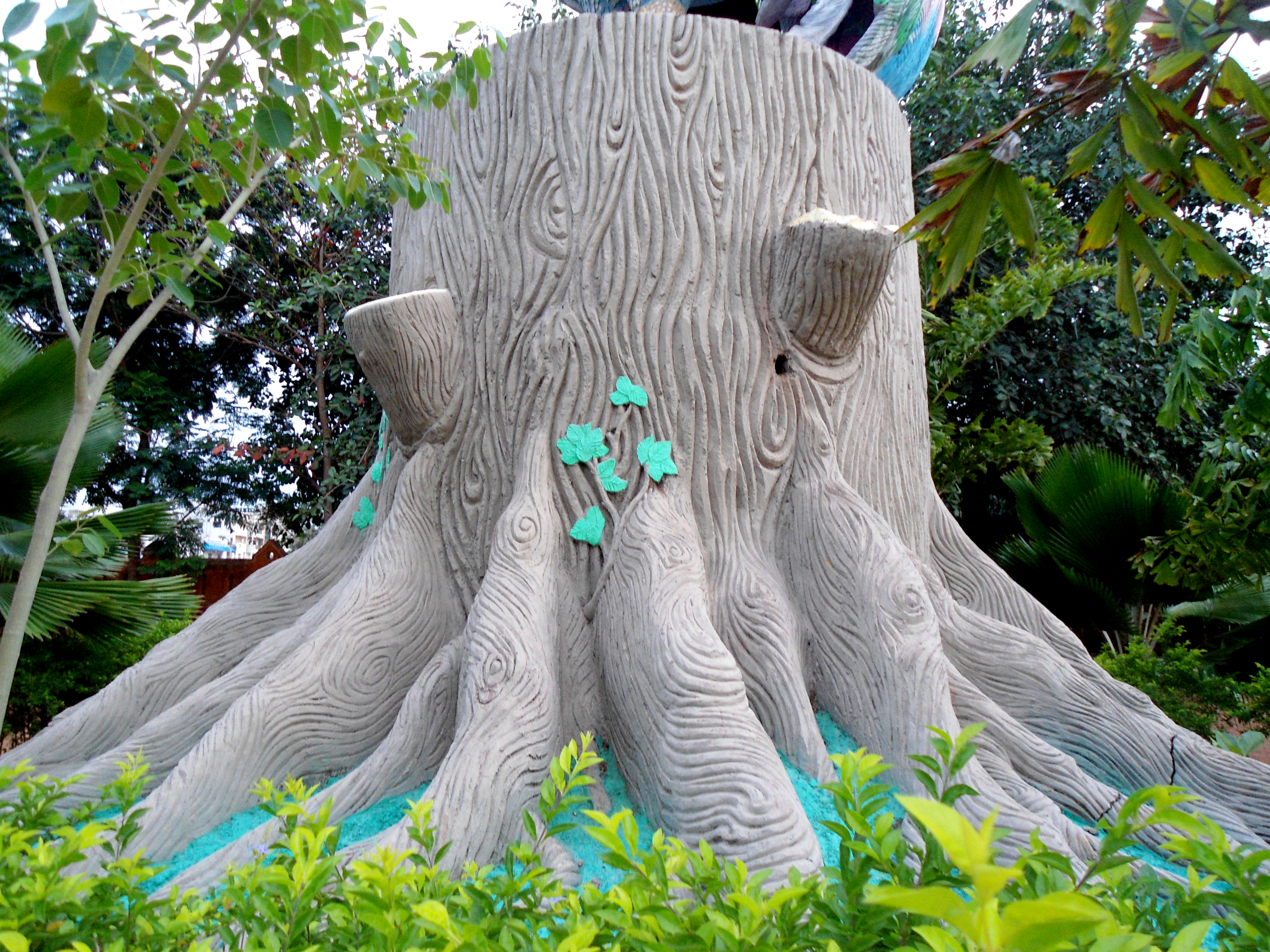
Replica of a tree

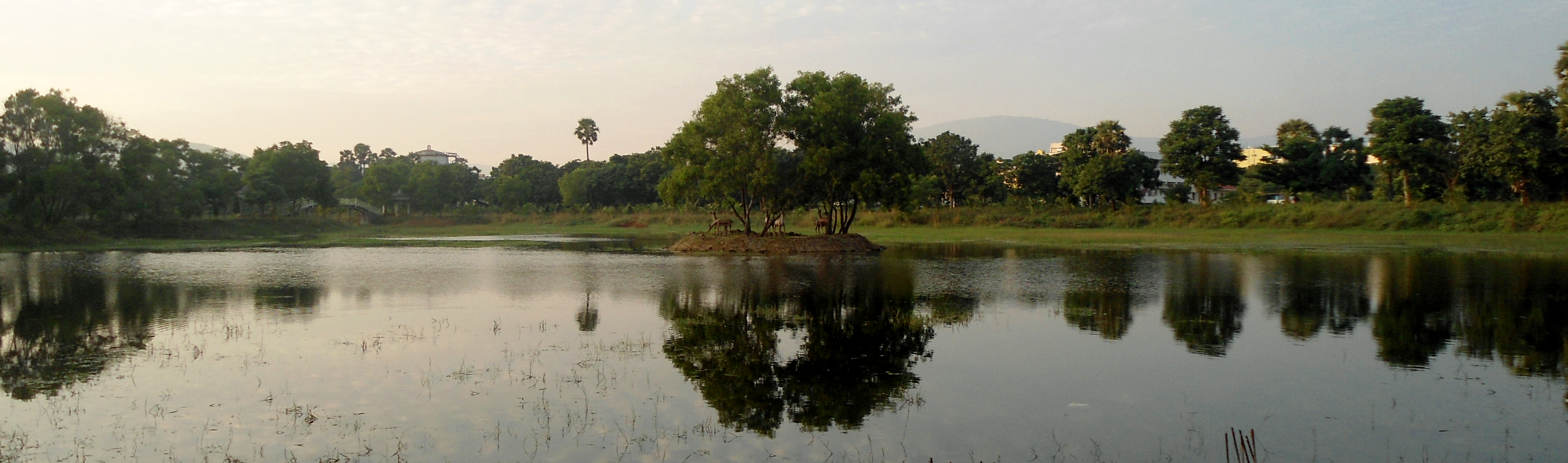
Pond at Shilparamam Jaatara

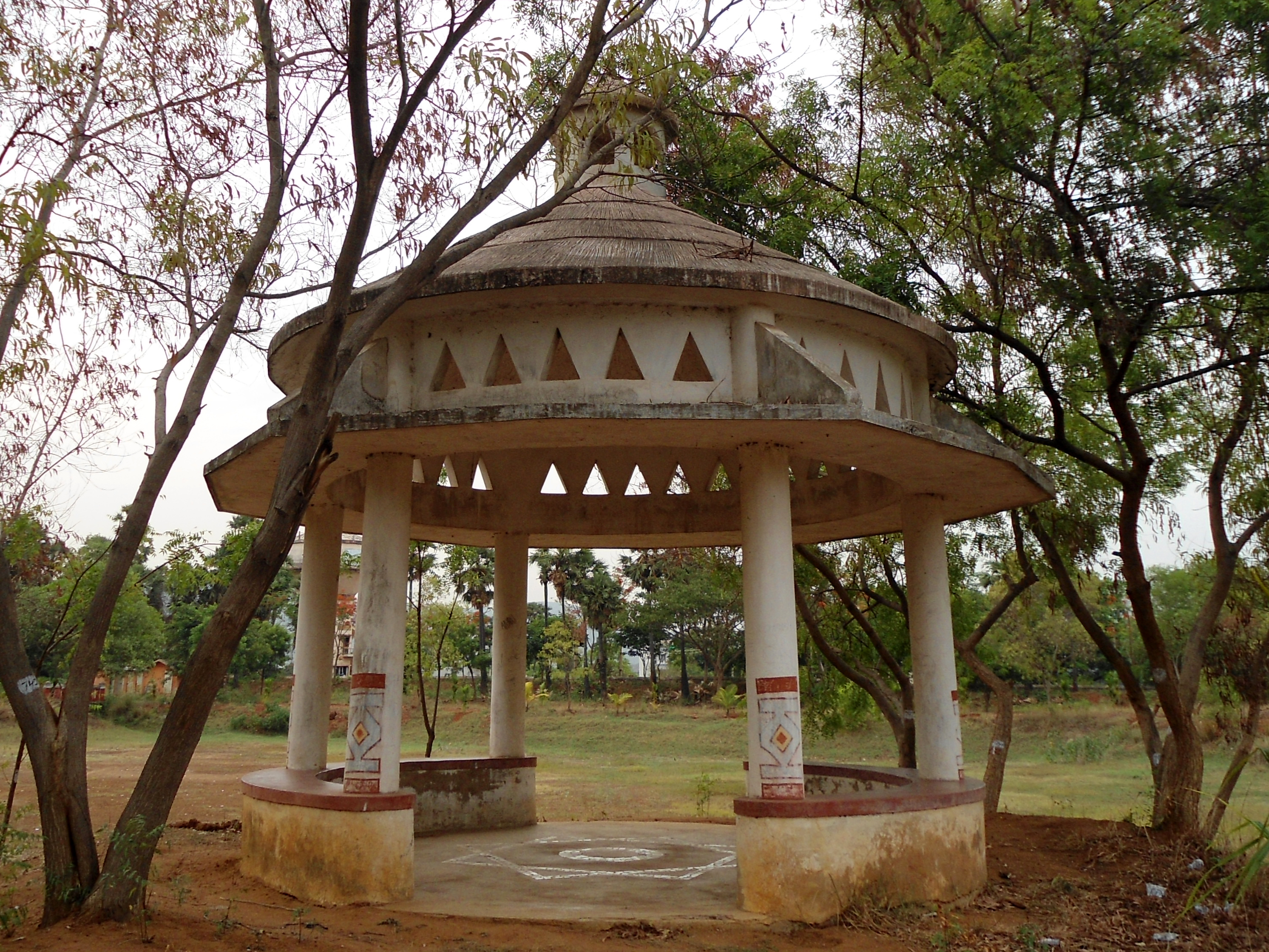
Resting hut at Shilparamam Jaatara

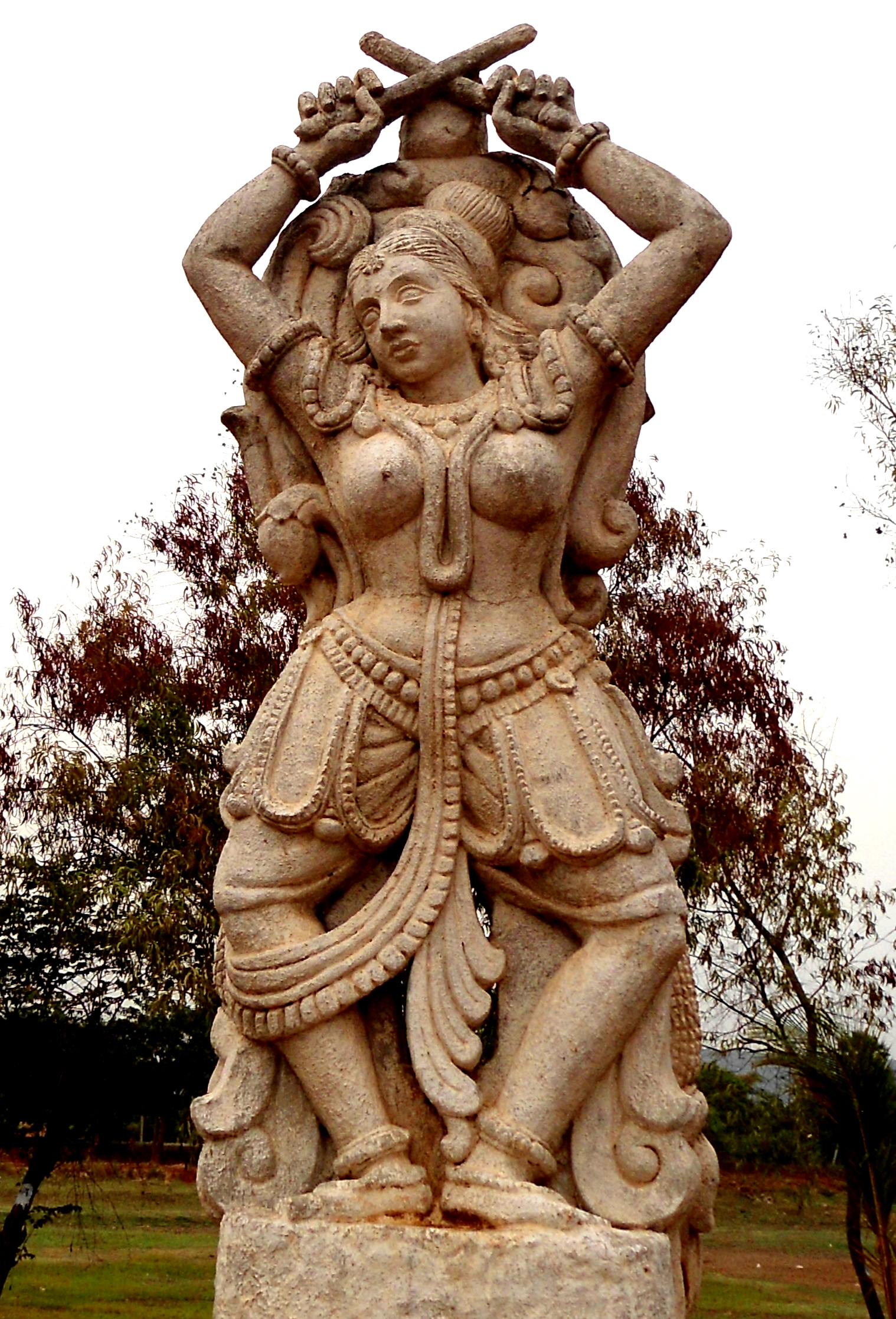
Statue of a dancer

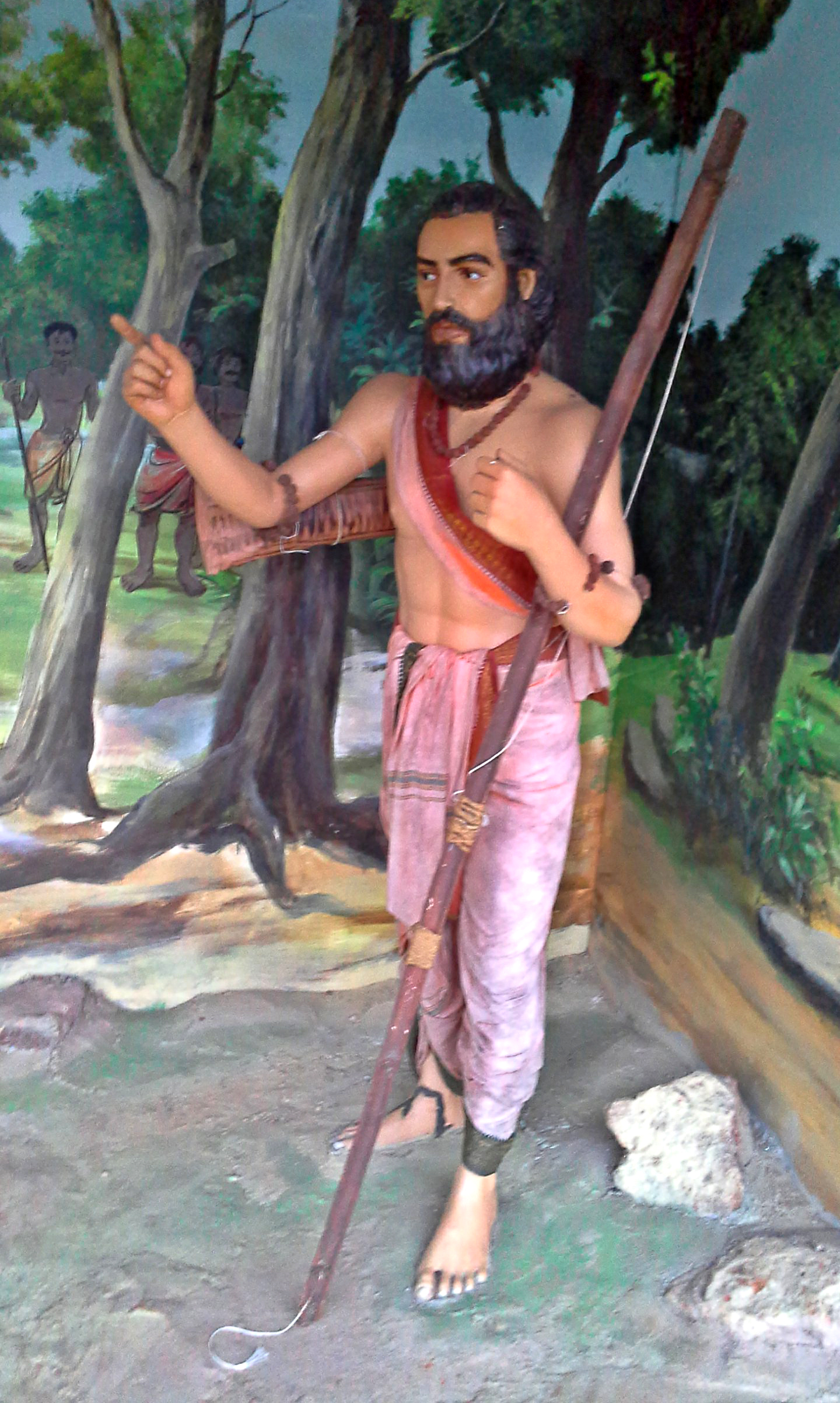
A replica of Alluri Sitarama Raju

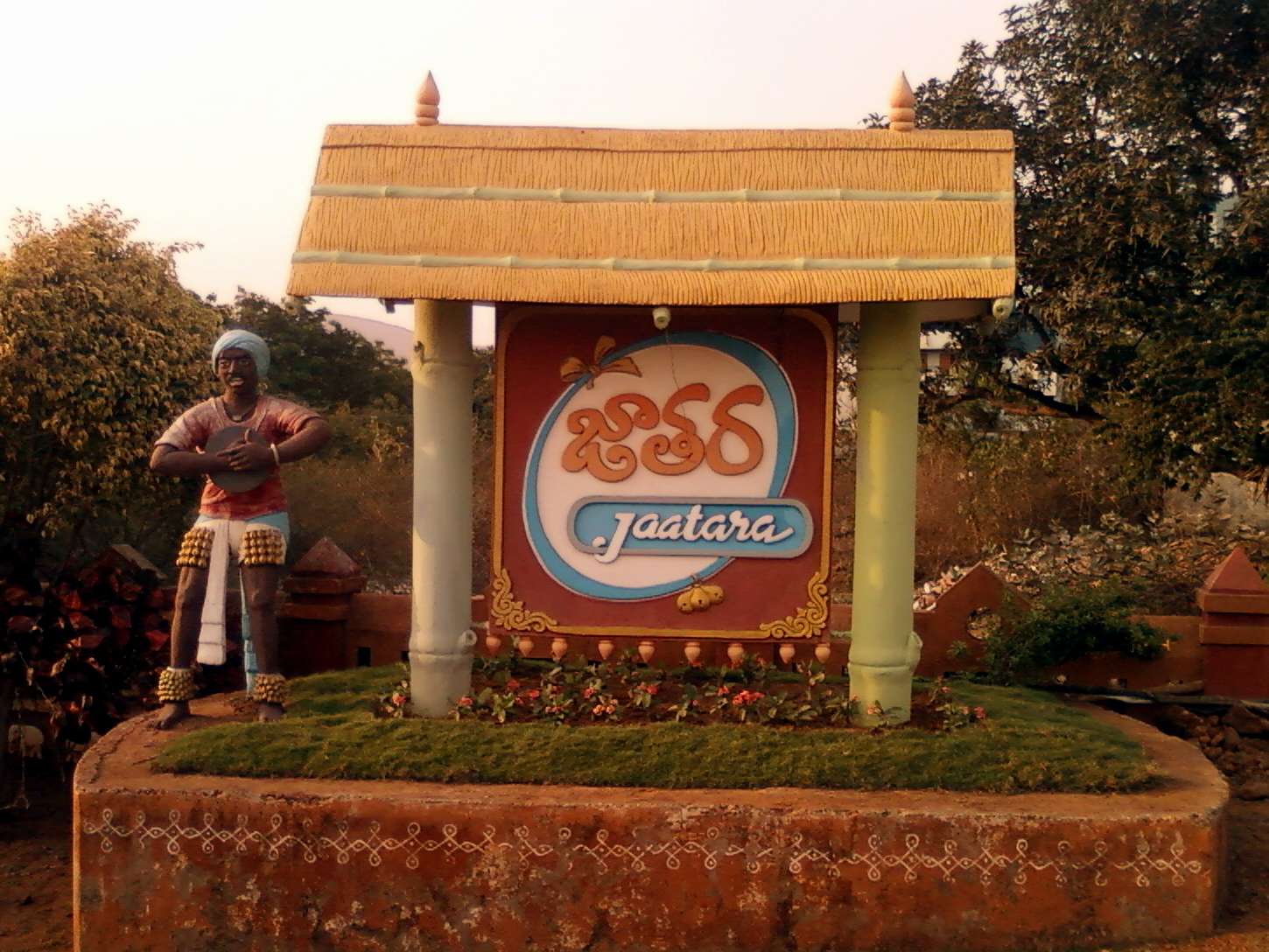
Welcome Sign at Shilparamam

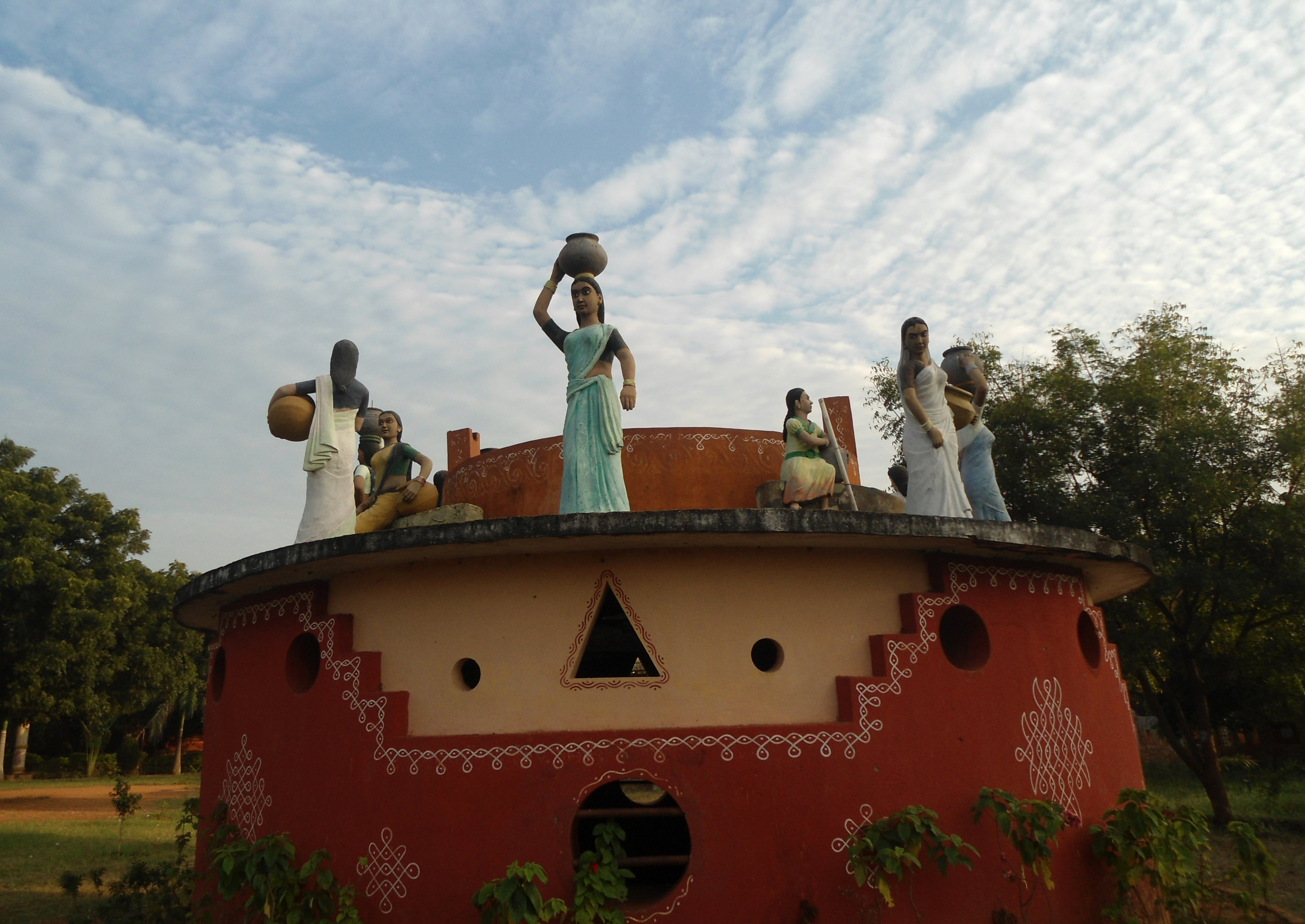
A well and replicas of village

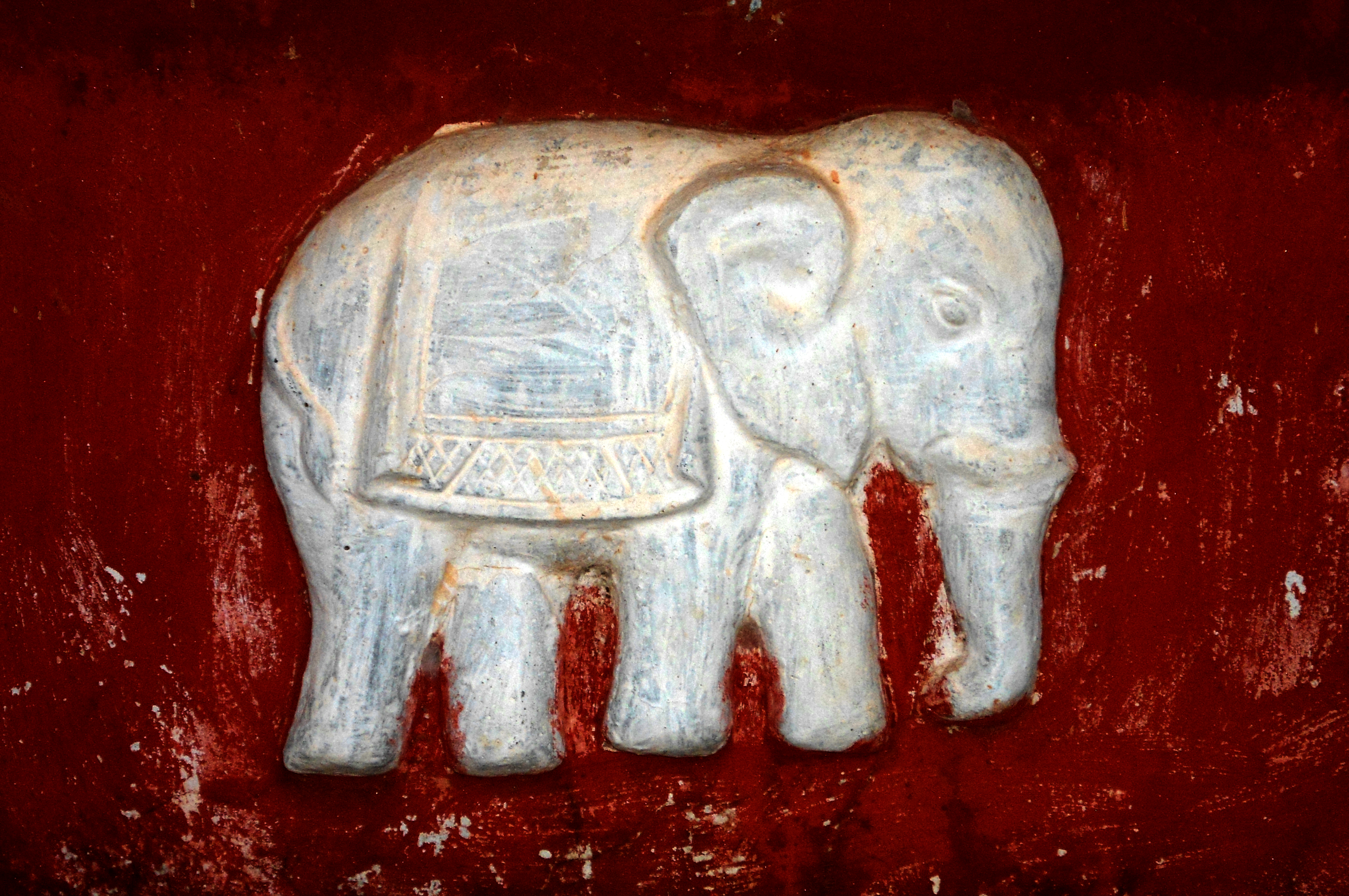
Cemented relief of an Asian elephant.
