= Fintech Valley Vizag =

Business initiative of the Government of Andhra Pradesh, India

Coordinates: 17.808041°N 83.388080°E

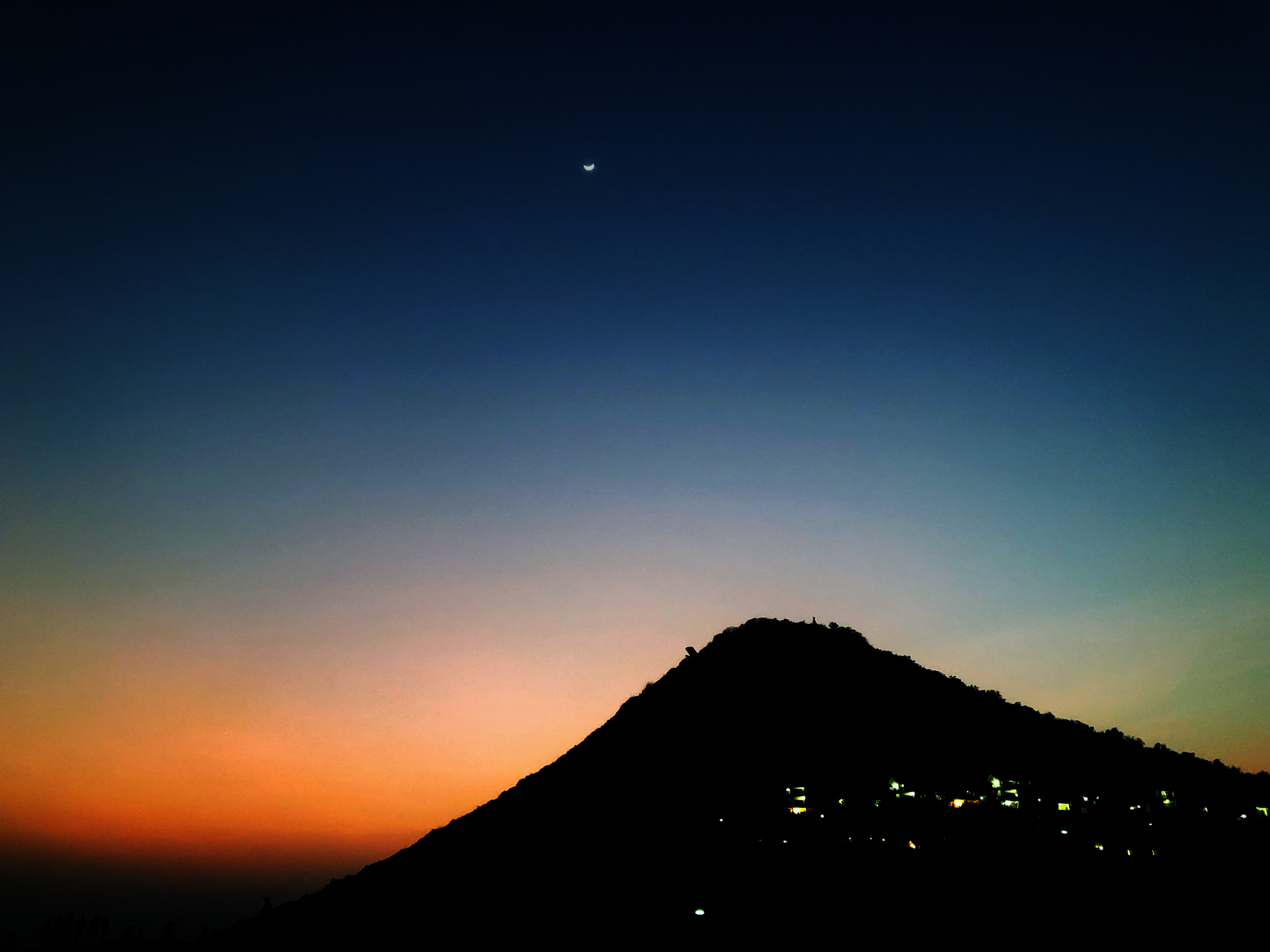
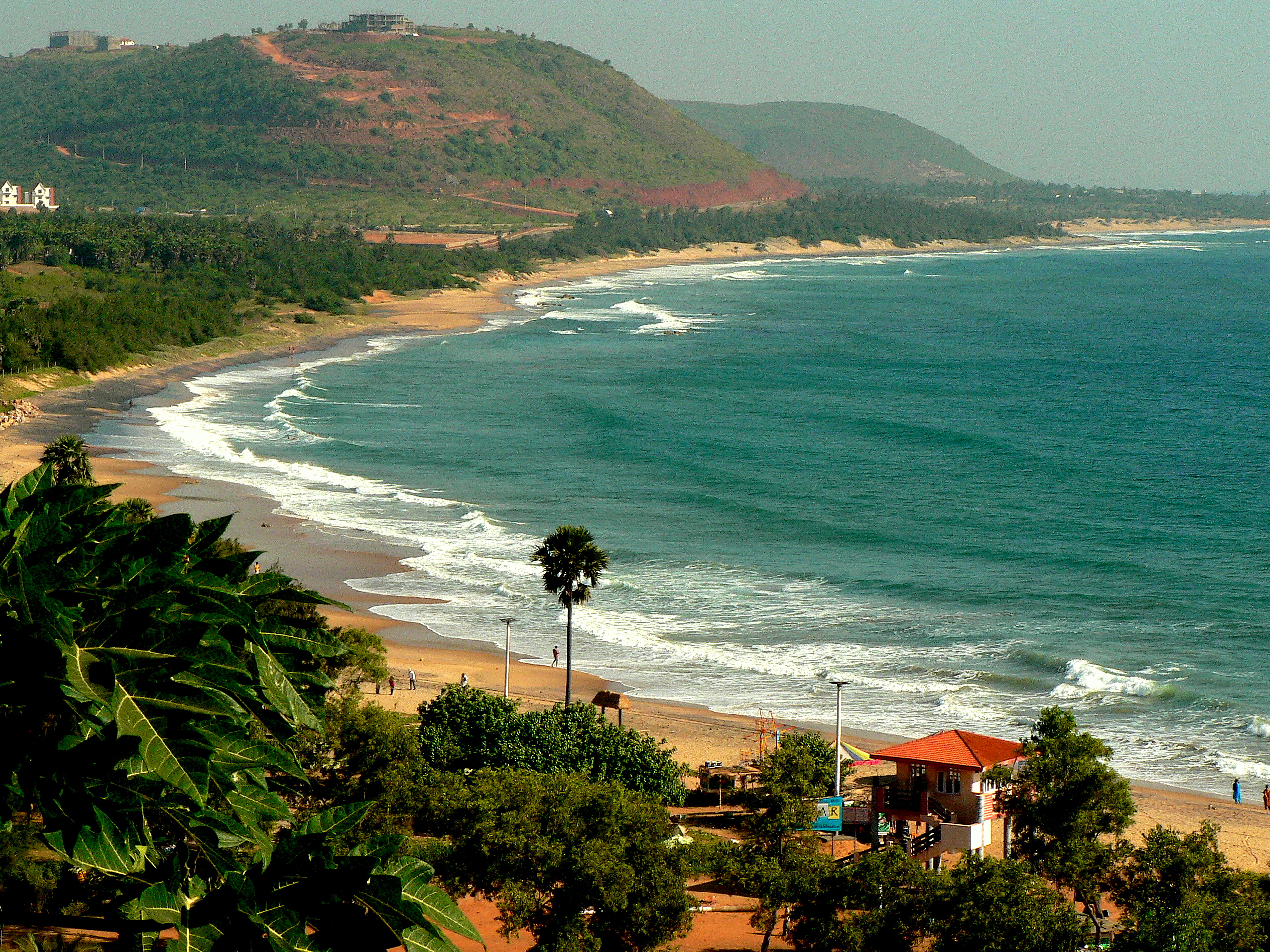
- Industry: Financial Technology; Artificial Intelligence; Blockchain Security; Information Technology; Biopharmaceutical
- Founded: 17 December 2016; 9 years ago
- Headquarters: Visakhapatnam, Andhra Pradesh, India
- Area served: Rushikonda; Kapuluppada; Madhurawada

Fintech Valley Vizag is an initiative of the Government of Andhra Pradesh to promote business infrastructure in the state, and attract investors and multinational corporations to set up offices. Fintech Valley was founded by N. Chandrababu Naidu then Chief Minister of the Andhra Pradesh state in December 2016 with the goal of enhancing Visakhapatnam City as a financial technology capital in Andhra Pradesh.

== Announcement ==
logo Fintech valley Vizag

In September 2016, Chief Minister Naidu declared the Fintech Valley Project through a document titled 'Sunrise Andhra Pradesh Vision 2029' stating its objectives and the proposed state growth achievable by 2029 and focusing on Fintech Valley will be developed as an innovation valley, and as one of the best financial centers in the world.

Visakhapatnam, also known as Vizag, was chosen as the city to host the projects of financial technology due to its size and potential for attracting investment. Endeavouring to be a “happy and globally-competitive society” by 2029, Andhra Pradesh state envisages transforming into an inclusive, accountable, and competitively innovative society. Initiating structural transformations and committing to sustain high economic growth, the Government of Andhra Pradesh placed FinTech as the epicentre of a focus to create an ecosystem of digital banking, financial analytics, cybersecurity, and blockchain (database) technology. Among the various promising initiatives taken under the auspices of FinTech Valley Vizag, the initiative pertaining to the FinTech ecosystem is the Andhra Pradesh Purse mobile wallet offering 13 mobile banking and 10 other mobile wallets for transactions.

The Government of Andhra Pradeshs' accord with the FinTech Association of Hong Kong is aimed at utilising Hong Kong's FinTech ecosystem and developing an Andhra Pradesh Hong Kong entrée for FinTech startups and knowledge transfer. It is the largest city in Andhra Pradesh with an IT industry whose turnover is Rs. 2,000 crore and an established industrial base. The objective was set to build into a thriving Finance & Technology ecosystem.

== Infrastructure ==
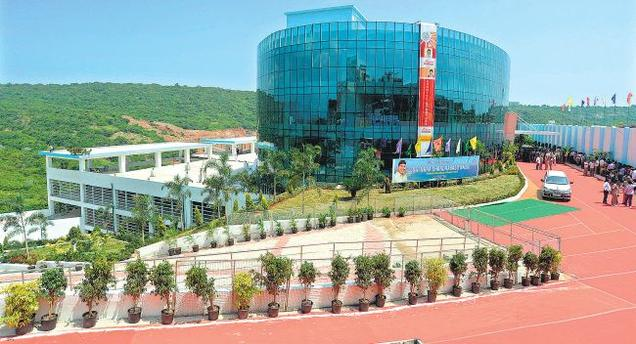
Sunrise Towers (Incubation Centre) at startup village Rushikonda, Vizag inaugurated by N. Chandrababu Naidu in 2015

To support start-up organizations, the government will provide infrastructure and market access to facilitate Proof of concept (PoC) of the start-up organizations.

- A purpose-built and government supported facility to provide infrastructure facilities at subsidized rates
- A 40-acre IT park in Rushikonda, Vizag
- A proposed 600 acre IT park at Kapuluppada
- Development of Mega IT hub at Madhurawada with infrastructure facilities

== Building the Fintech Ecosystem ==
- AP FIBERNET - Connect all Gram Panchayats and provide high-speed internet connection to all households as well as a 1 Gbit/s connection to businesses
- Andhra Pradesh - Purse: A mobile wallet encompassing 13 mobile banking and 10 other mobile wallets available to use for transactions
- Digital financial literacy: Introduce Marpu Nestam, an incentives-based program to set up agents who educate people on digital financial literacy
- Real time governance: To make administration more efficient and responsive
- Chief Minister's Dashboard: Effective monitoring of key performance indicators of state government departments
- E-Pragathi: E-governance through digitization of all government projects including education, agriculture and health

== Finteract ==
Fintech Valley Vizag launched 'Finteract', a platform to engage with the startup community during the Spring Conference 2017. Technology start-ups Blueocean Market Intelligence and HelloSoda India emerged as the winners of the Capital Markets segment of the Fintech Start-up Challenge 2017. The participating start-ups were invited to take up Angel Broking's stated challenge of “Real-Time Social Profiling of Customers”. Blue Ocean Market Intelligence presented its solution developed on its proprietary "Digital Persona and Insights Solution" platform, HelloSoda India's solution was built on its “PROFILE” platform.

== Companies in the valley ==
Cardlytics, ValueLabs, Blocktrust, Knolskape, Transaction Analysts, Genesys Labs and GMS, Paytm have offices in the valley.

The Monetary Authority of Singapore, HSBC and Broadridge are among the 10 companies who are set to provide development and resource sharing Memorandums of Understanding (MoUs).
