= Majjipeta =

- Village
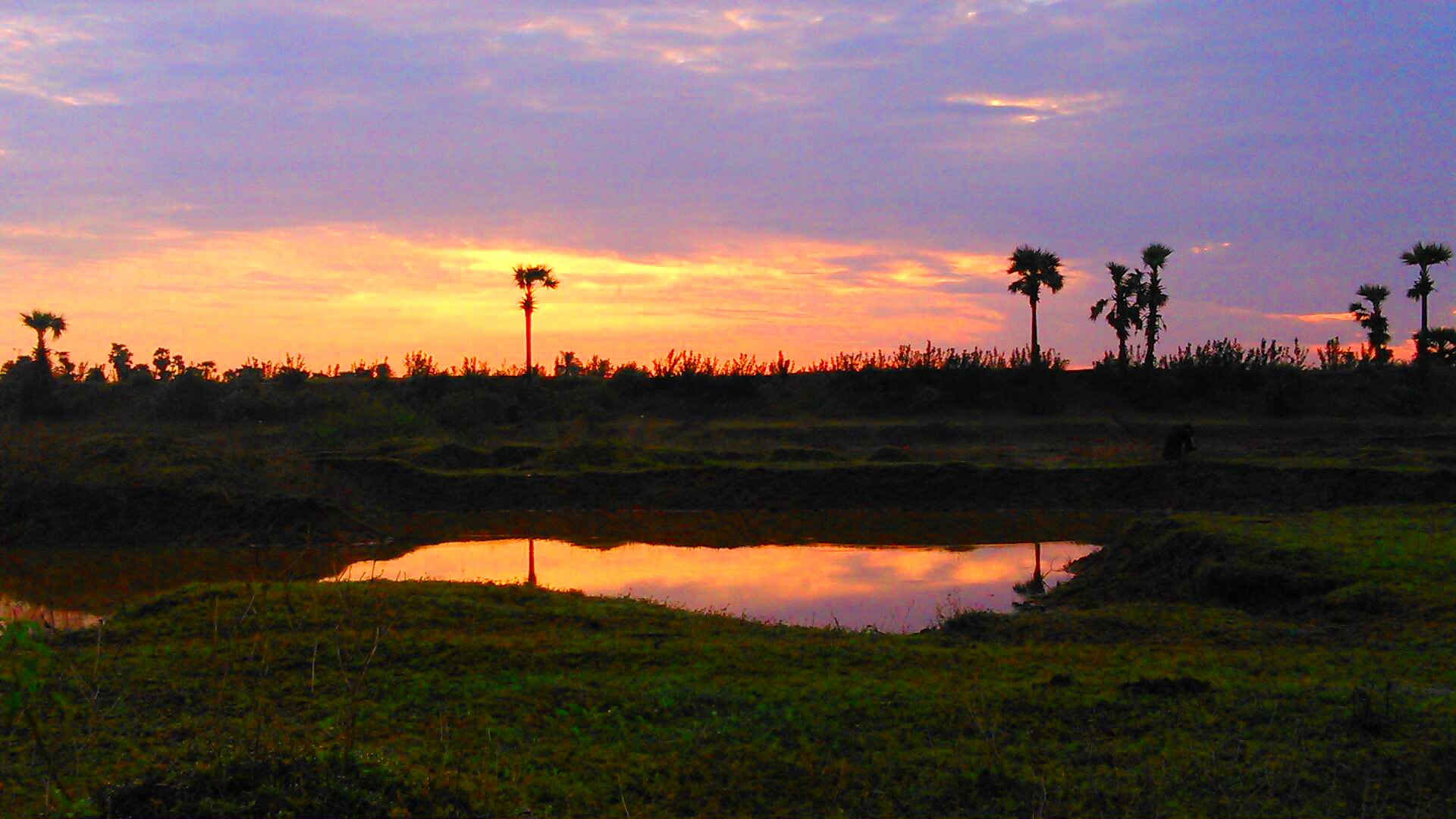
- Sun rise in majjipeta.jpg
- Interactive map of Majjipeta
- Location in Andhra Pradesh, India
- Coordinates: 17°55′52″N 83°25′44″E
- Country: India
- State: Andhra Pradesh
- District: Visakhapatnam district
- mandal: Bheemunipatnam mandal

Government
  - Body: grama panchayat

Population (2011)Schools
  - Total: 2,500
  - Density: 358/km^{2} (930/sq mi)

Languages
  - Official: Telugu
- Time zone: UTC+5:30 (IST)
- PIN: 531162
- Vehicle registration: AP-39

Majjipeta is a village in Bheemunipatnam mandal of Visakhapatnam district in Andhra Pradesh, India.
