= Mulakuddu =

- Census town
- Location in Andhra Pradesh, India Mulakuddu (India)
- Coordinates: 17.886385°N 83.447109°E
- Country: India
- State: Andhra Pradesh
- District: Vishakhapatnam
- Mandal: Bheemunipatnam

Languages
  - Official: Telugu
- Time zone: UTC+5:30 (IST)
- PIN: 531084
- Vehicle registration: AP 31
- Vidhan Sabha constituency: Bheemili
- Lok Sabha constituency: Visakhapatnam

Mulakuddu (Telugu: ములకుద్దు, Telugu pronunciation: [mulakud̪ːu]) is a census town in Bheemunipatnam mandal of Vishakhapatnam district in the Indian state of Andhra Pradesh. It lies 37km towards the north of Visakhapatnam. The total population of Mulakuddu is 4513 according to the 2011 Census of India. Among them, males are 2255 and females are 2258.
