= Nidigattu =

- Suburb
- Location in Visakhapatnam
- Coordinates: 17.862371°N 83.381772°E
- Country: India
- State: Andhra Pradesh
- District: Visakhapatnam

Languages
  - Official: Telugu
- Time zone: UTC+5:30 (IST)
- PIN: 530048
- Vehicle registration: AP-31,32

Nidigattu is a suburb situated in Visakhapatnam City, India. The area is quite close to the Kapuluppada. this area is in Bheemunipatnam mandal.
