= Rushikonda =

- Neighbourhood
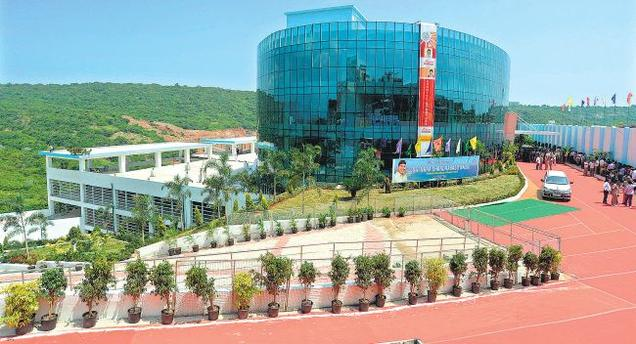
- Startup Village Building.

- Location Visakhapatnam
- Coordinates: 17.802548°N 83.385310°E
- Country: India
- State: Andhra Pradesh
- District: Visakhapatnam
- City: Visakhapatnam

Languages
  - Official: Telugu
- Time zone: UTC+5:30 (IST)
- PIN: 530045
- Vehicle Registration: AP31 (Former); AP39 (from 30 January 2019)

Rushikonda is a neighbourhood situated on Visakhapatnam and Bheemili road. Visakhapatnam Metropolitan Region Development Authority undertakes the development activities related to infrastructure and tourism.

== Transport ==
APSRTC routes

| Route number | Start | End | Via |
|---|---|---|---|
| 900K | Railway Station | Bheemili | RTC Complex, Siripuram, Pedawaltair, Appughar, Sagarnagar, Rushikonda, Thimmapuram, INS Kalinga |
| 900T | Railway Station | Tagarapuvalasa | RTC Complex, Siripuram, Pedawaltair, Appughar, Sagarnagar, Rushikonda, Thimmapuram, INS Kalinga |
| 999 | RTC Complex | Bheemili | Maddilapalem, Hanumanthwaka, Yendada, Madhurawada, Anandapuram |
| 17K | Old Head Post Office | Bheemili | Town Kotharoad, Jagadamba Centre, RTC Complex, Siripuram, Pedawaltair, Appughar, Sagarnagar, Rushikonda, Thimmapuram, INS Kalinga |
| 52E | Old Head Post Office | Pedarushikonda | Town Kotharoad, Jagadamba Centre, RTC Complex, Maddilapalem, Hanumanthuwaka, Yendada, Rushikonda |

== See also ==
- Fintech Valley Vizag
