= Lingojigudem =

- Village
- Nickname: ling city
- Country: India
- State: Telangana

Languages
  - Official: Telugu
- Time zone: UTC+5:30 (IST)
- PIN: 508252

Lingojigudem is a village in Yadadri Bhuvanagiri district in Telangana, India. It falls under the Choutuppal mandal.
