= Madhurawada =

- Neighbourhood
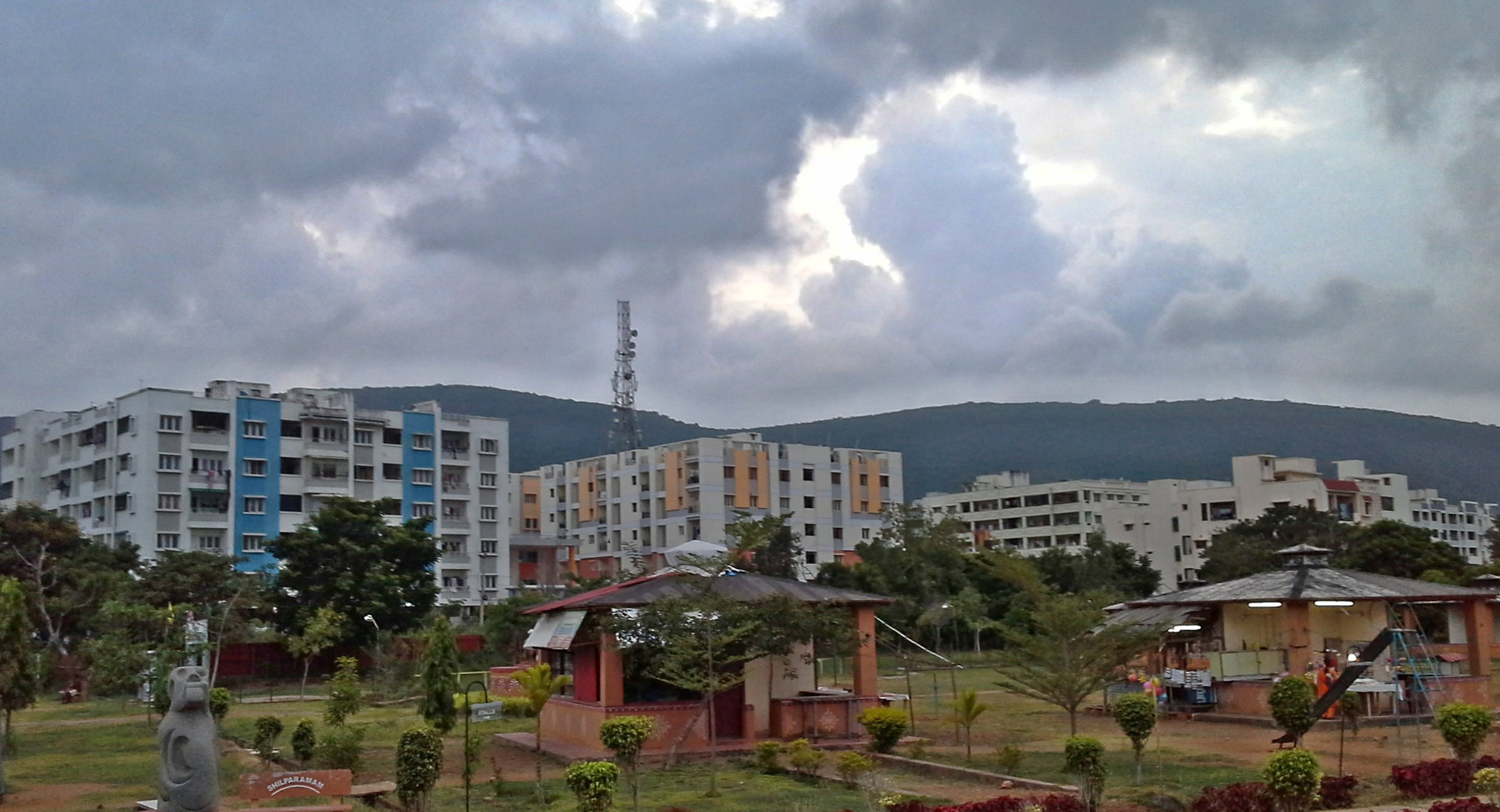
- Far view of Madhurawada

- Location in Visakhapatnam
- Coordinates: 17°48′06″N 83°21′12″E
- Country: India
- State: Andhra Pradesh
- District: Visakhapatnam

Government
  - Type: Mayor-council
  - Body: GVMC

Languages
  - Official: Telugu
- Time zone: UTC+5:30 (IST)
- PIN: 530048
- Vehicle Registration: AP31 (Former); AP39 (from 30 January 2019)

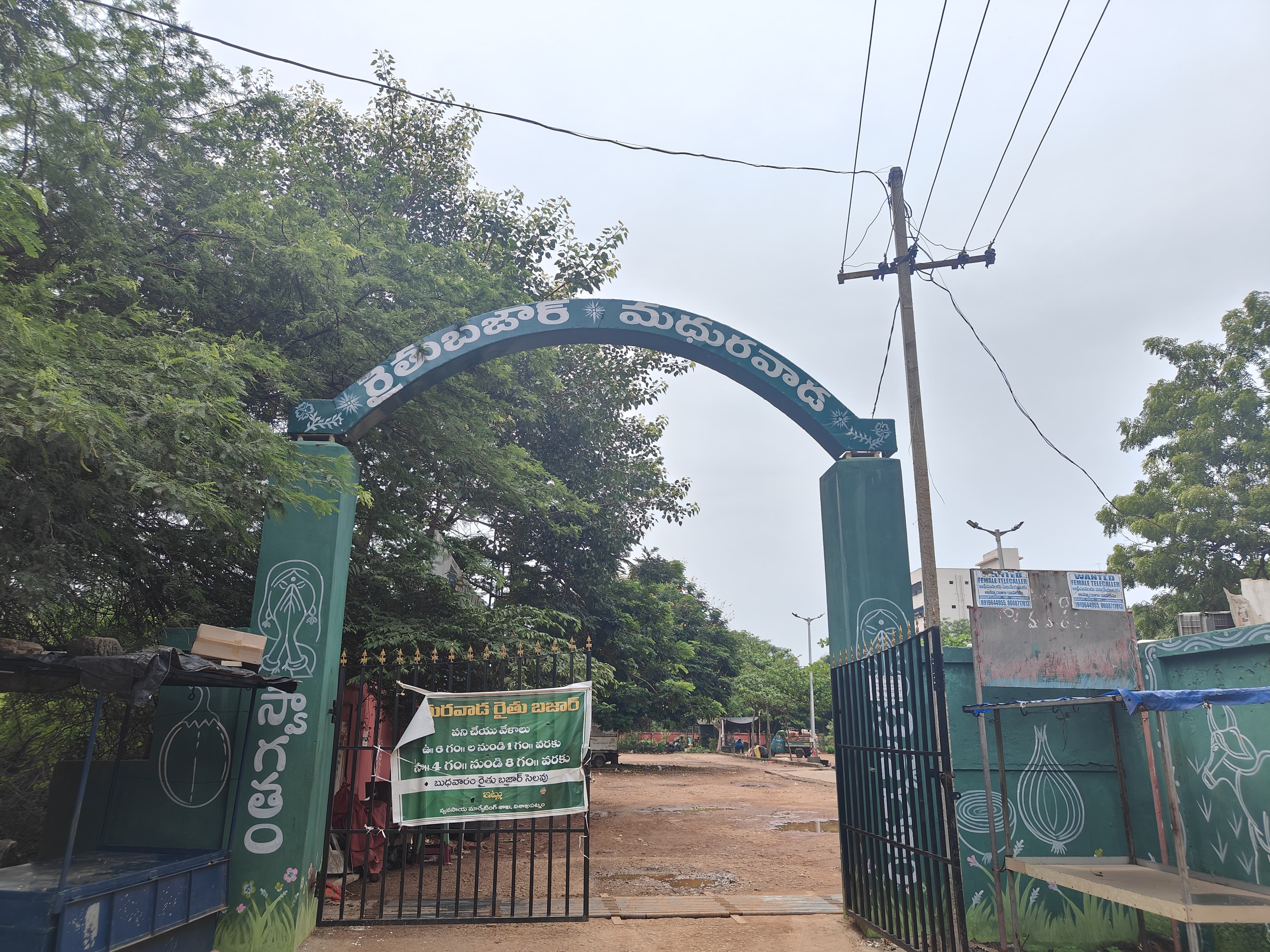
raitu bazaar

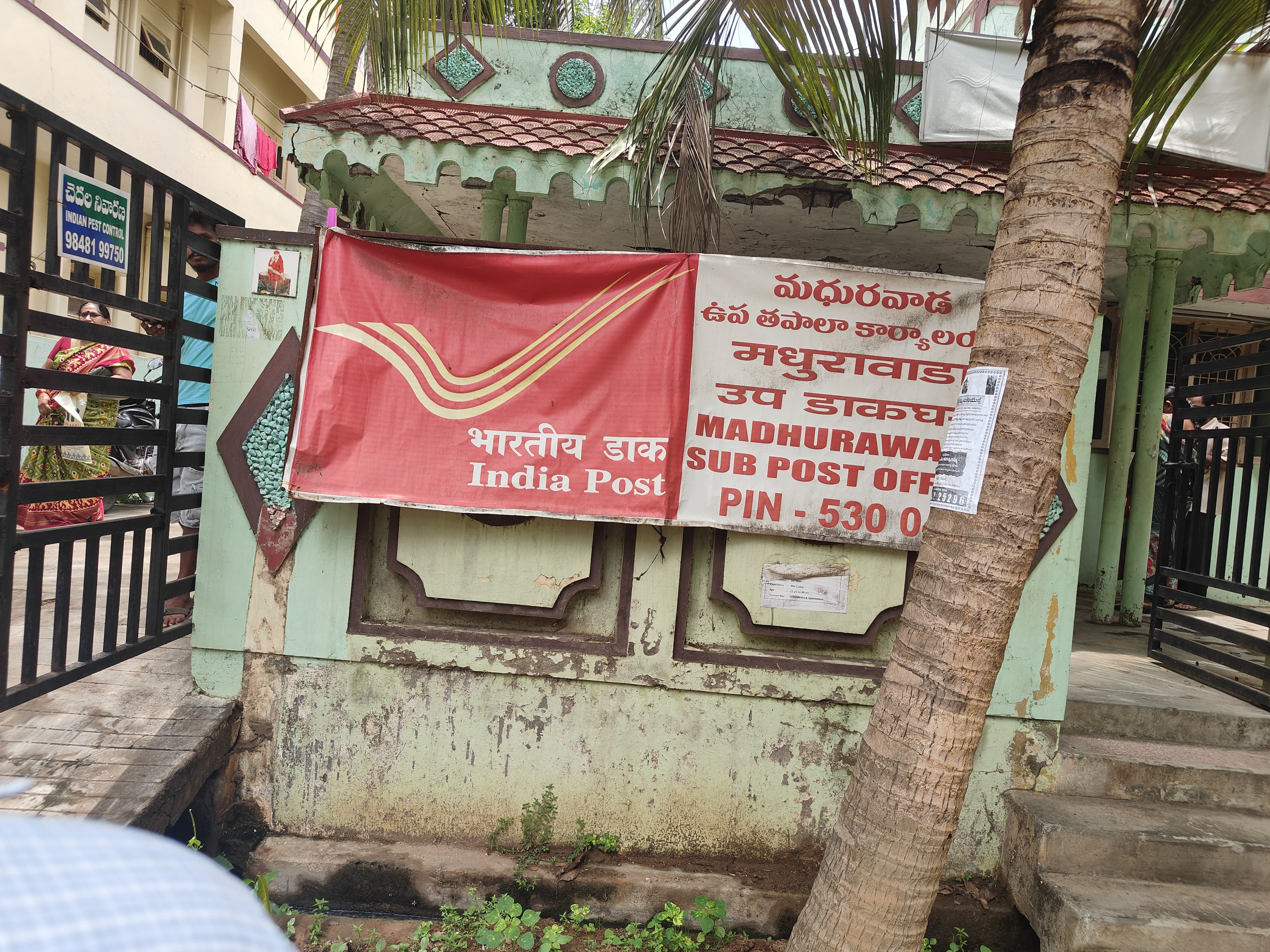
post office

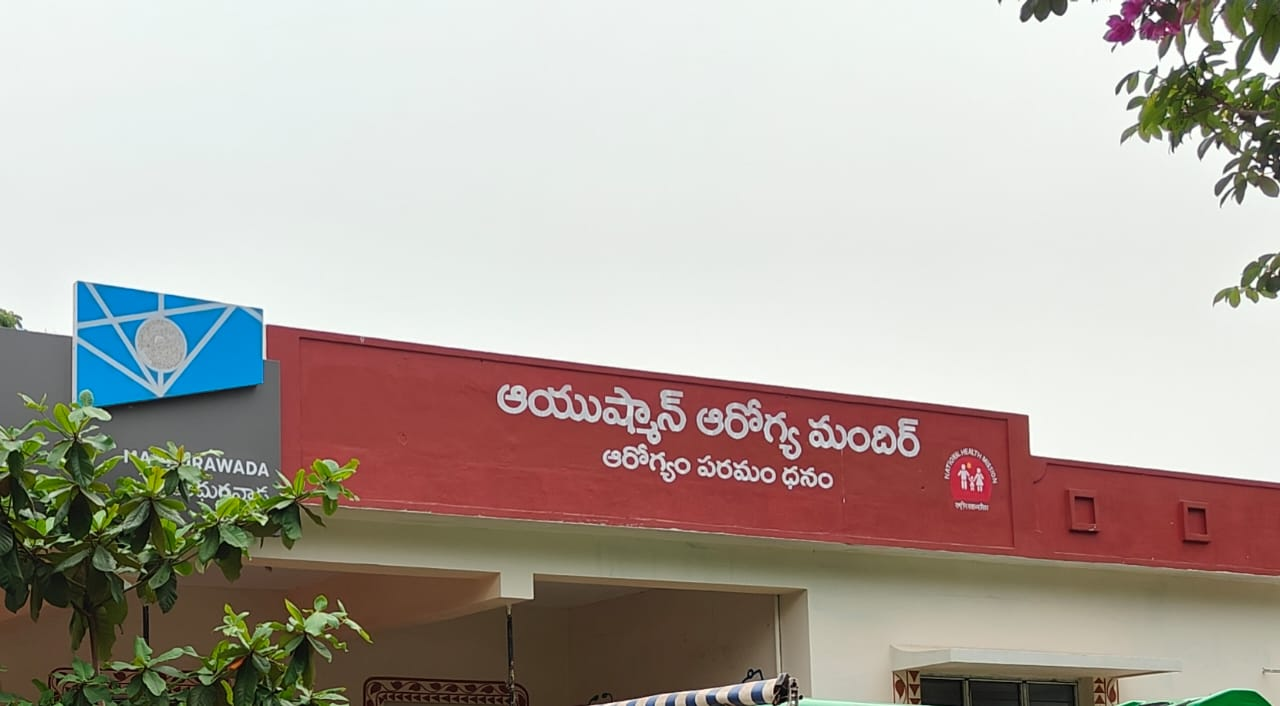
health center in madhurawada

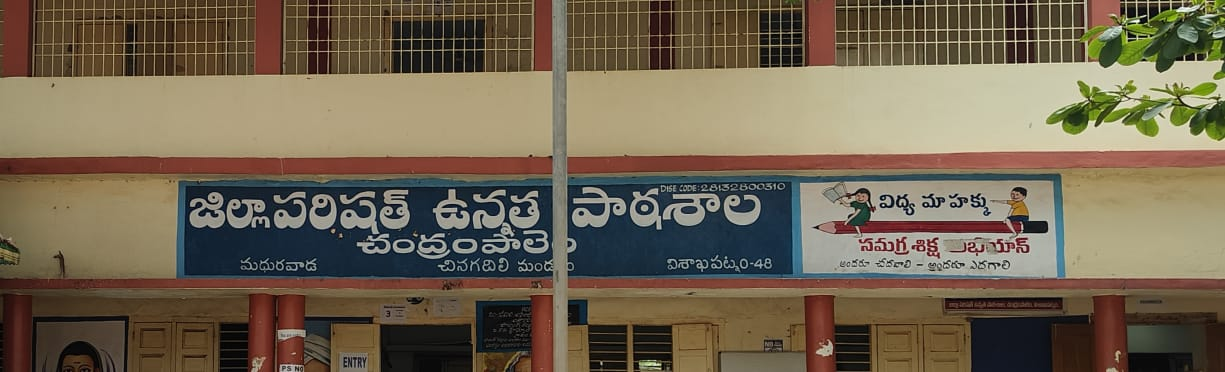
zilla parishad high school in madhurawada

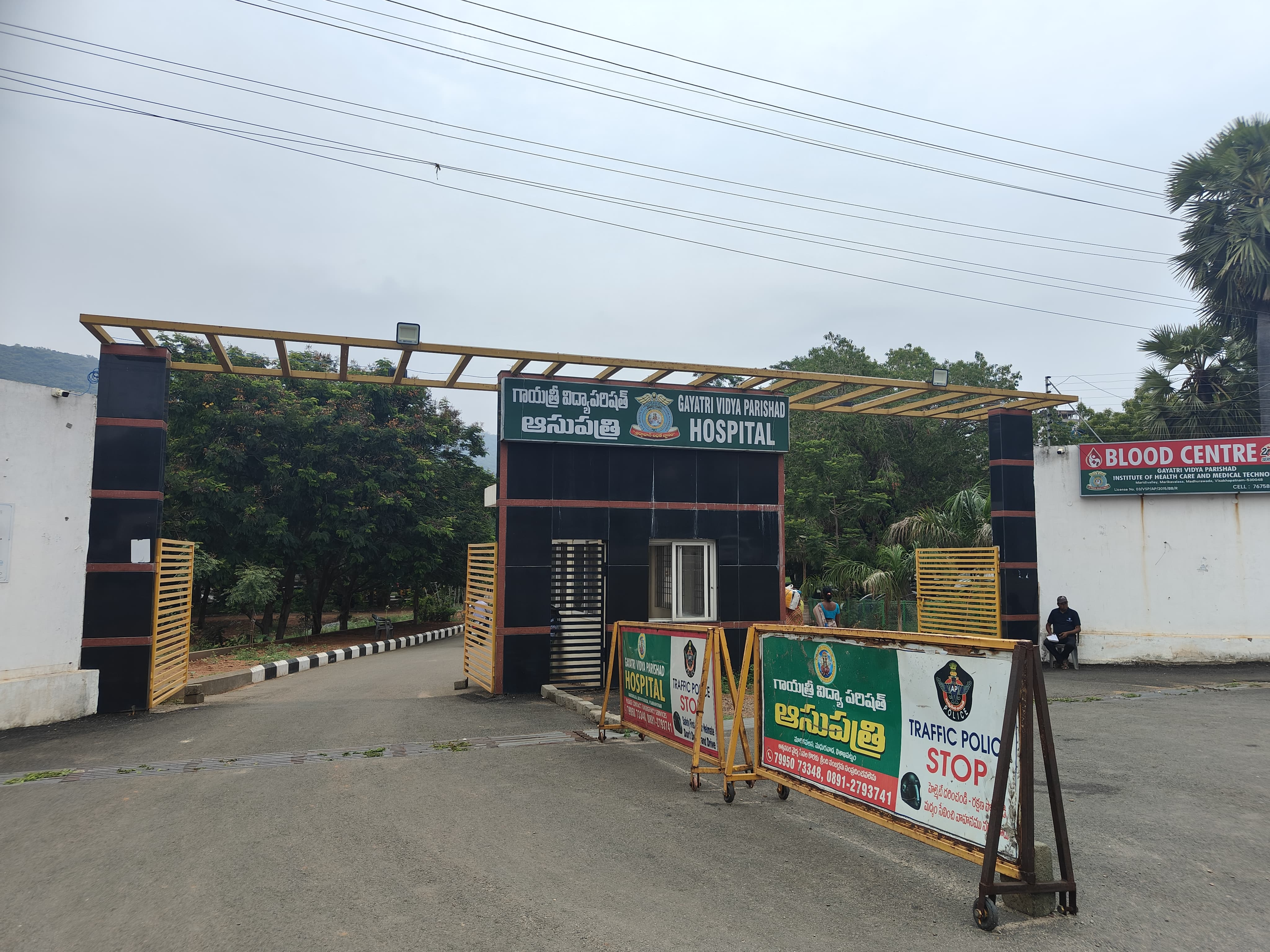
gayathri hospital madhurawada

Madhurawada is a major business and residential area of Visakhapatnam in the state of Andhra Pradesh. It is located on the Visakhapatnam-Vizianagaram stretch of National Highway 16 around 16 km from the city center of Visakhapatnam.

This region is famous for its Visakhapatnam IT Special Economic Zone, located in the proposed digitally-enabled smart urban city. Among the state Tourism Department's six major projects announced in 2018, planning has begun on a Special Tourism Zone with 250 acres for hotels, an amusement park, and oceanarium.

This suburb consists of many popular tourist sites, such as Pothinamallayya Palem, Chandrampalem, Mithilapuri VUDA colony, Revallapalem, Ganeshnagar, and Port colony.

== History ==
Madhurawada was the site of a pre-historic culture during the Neolithic period. As reported by an Andhra University professor, "on the Visakhapatnam coast the Neolithic folk settled on the red sediments, and their cultural remains were subsequently covered by the aeolian sands as revealed by studies at Ramayogi Agraharam, Paradesipalem, Madhurawada, Marikavalasa, and Lankelapalem."

== Commerce ==
Madhurawada is a major commercial center with shopping spaces including a DMart, Reliance Trends and Reliance Digital for retail and a Metro Cash & Carry for wholesale purchases. Srikanya Cinepolis, STBL Cine World, and Durga Theatre are the major movie theaters.

== Transport ==
APSRTC routes

The Madhurawada Bus Depot is situated in the neighborhood of Mithilapuri VUDA colony. It is well connected to the state's major towns, such as Kurnool, Kadapa, Srisailam, Bhimavaram, Amalapuram, and Tirupati. APSRTC (25-Series) provides bus services to the other parts of the city.

Route number	Start	End	Via
25K	Bakkannapalem	Old Head Post Office	Madhurawada, Yendada, Hanumanthuwaka, Maddilapalem, RTC Complex, Jagadamba Centre, Town Kotharoad
25M	Marikavalasa	Old Head Post Office	Madhurawada, Yendada, Hanumanthuwaka, Maddilapalem, RTC Complex, Jagadamba Centre, Town Kotharoad
25G	Ganeshnagar	Old Head Post Office	Madhurawada, Yendada, Hanumanthuwaka, Maddilapalem, RTC Complex, Jagadamba Centre, Town Kotharoad
25S	YSR Nagar	Old Head Post Office	Madhurawada, Yendada, Hanumanthuwaka, Maddilapalem, RTC Complex, Jagadamba Centre, Town Kotharoad
25R	Gurajada Nagar	Railway Station	Madhurawada, Yendada, Hanumanthuwaka, Maddilapalem, RTC Complex
25J	Sevanagar	Railway Station	Madhurawada, Yendada, Hanumanthuwaka, Maddilapalem, RTC Complex
25E	Kommadi	Old Head Post Office	Madhurawada, Yendada, Hanumanthuwaka, Maddilapalem, RTC Complex, Jagadamba Centre, Town Kotharoad
222	Tagarapuvalasa	RTC Complex	Anandapuram, Madhurawada, Yendada, Hanumanthuwaka, Maddilapalem, RTC Complex
999	Bhimunipatnam	RTC Complex	Anandapuram, Madhurawada, Yendada, Hanumanthuwaka, Maddilapalem, RTC Complex
111	Tagarapuvalasa	Kurmannapalem	Anandapuram, Madhurawada, Yendada, Hanumanthuwaka, Maddilapalem, RTC Complex, Jagadamba Centre, Town Kotharoad

== See also ==
- Fintech Valley Vizag
- Visakhapatnam
