= Kapuluppada =

- Neighbourhood
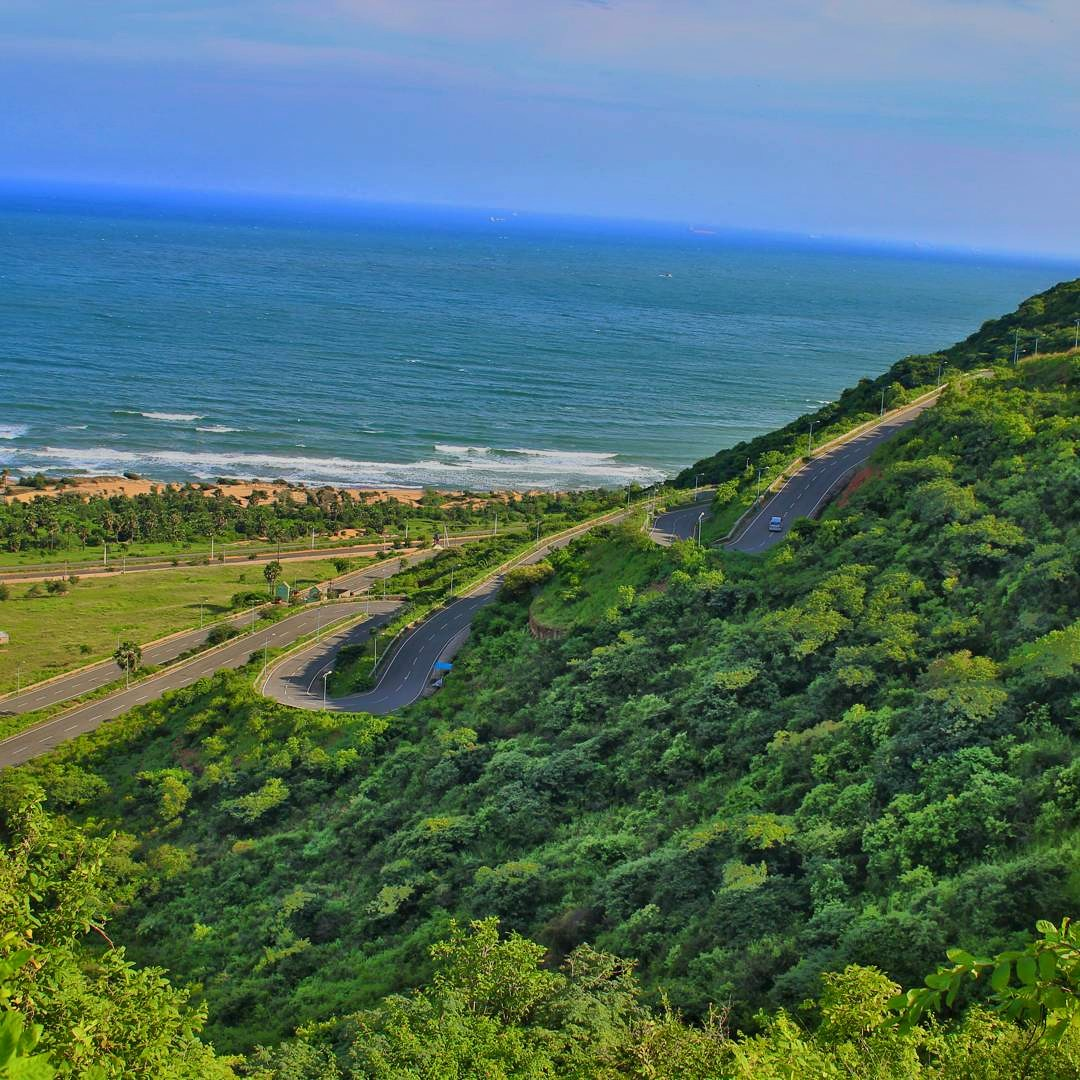
- Ramanaidu studio at Kapuluppada

- Location in Visakhapatnam
- Coordinates: 17.828371°N 83.385569°E
- Country: India
- State: Andhra Pradesh
- District: Visakhapatnam

Government
  - Body: Greater Visakhapatnam Municipal Corporation

Languages
  - Official: Telugu
- Time zone: UTC+5:30 (IST)
- PIN: 530048
- Vehicle registration: AP-31

Kapuluppada is a neighborhood situated on the northern part of Visakhapatnam City, India. The area, which falls under the local administrative limits of Greater Visakhapatnam Municipal Corporation, is about 25 km from the Visakhapatnam Railway Station.

== About ==
Kapuluppada is one of the future Andhra Pradesh State Information Technology centers that the government of Andhra Pradesh is planning to set up many software companies there.

== Transport ==
APSRTC routes

Route number	Start	End	Via
900K	Railway Station	Bheemili	RTC Complex, Siripuram, Pedawaltair, Appughar, Sagarnagar, Rushikonda, Thimmapuram, INS Kalinga
900T	Railway Station	Tagarapuvalasa	RTC Complex, Siripuram, Pedawaltair, Appughar, Sagarnagar, Rushikonda, Thimmapuram, INS Kalinga
999	RTC Complex	Bheemili	Maddilapalem, Hanumanthwaka, Yendada, Madhurawada, Anandapuram
17K	Old Head Post Office	Bheemili	Town Kotharoad, Jagadamba Centre, RTC Complex, Siripuram, Pedawaltair, Appughar, Sagarnagar, Rushikonda, Thimmapuram, INS Kalinga

== See also ==
- Fintech Valley Vizag
- Visakhapatnam
