= Economy of Andhra Pradesh =

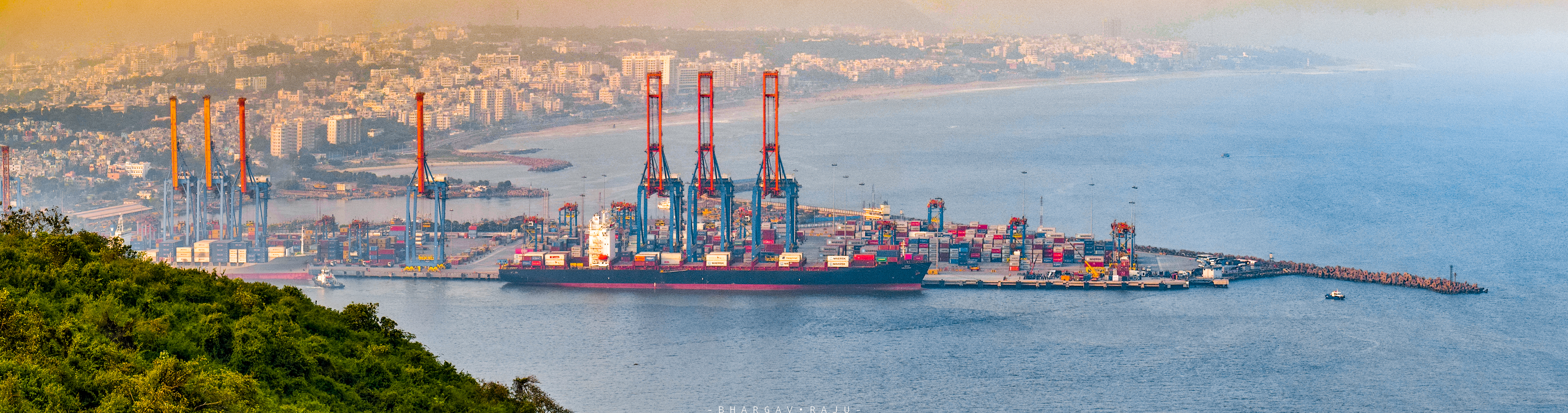
- Visakhapatnam, the financial capital of Andhra Pradesh
- Currency: Indian Rupee ₹
- Fiscal year: 1 April – 31 March

Statistics
- Population: ▲53,448,000 (2024)
- GDP: ₹19.75 lakh crore (US$205 billion) (2026-2027)
- GDP rank: 9th
- GDP growth: ▲6.46% (2023–2024) ▲8.27% (2024–2025) ▲9.88% (2025–2026)
- GDP per capita: ₹298,058 (equivalent to ₹320,000 or US$3,297 in 2026) (nominal; 2024-25)
- GDP per capita rank: 15th
- GDP by sector: Agriculture 37% Industry 23% Services 40% (2023–24)
- Population below national poverty line: ▼2.2% in poverty (2022-23)
- Human Development Index: ▲0.681 medium (2023)
- Unemployment: ▲8.2% (Sep 2025)

Public finance
- Government debt: 35% of GSDP (2025–26 est.)
- Budget balance: ₹−79,927 crore (US$−8.3 billion) (4.4% of GSDP) (2025–26 est.)
- Revenue: ₹2.17.977 lakh crore (US$23 billion) (2025–26 est.)
- Spending: ₹2.97.929 lakh crore (US$31 billion) (2025–26 est.)
- All values, unless otherwise stated, are in US dollars.

The economy of the Indian state of Andhra Pradesh is primarily dependent on agriculture, which directly and indirectly employs 62% of the population. GSDP as per the first revised estimate, for the year 2023-24 is ₹15,40,000 crore. The state is ranked 1st in the country for the year 2021-22 in terms of the Gross State Domestic Product (GSDP) growth at constant prices with growth rate of 11.43%. The state GSDP is expected to grow at a rate of 17% for the year 2023-24.

The state achieved overall 4th rank in SDG India Report for the year 2020-21, with first rank in SDG-7 (affordable energy) & second rank in Goal-14 (Life below water).

The state has been ranked the best state in ease of doing business in the country for the year 2016 by the World Bank. The state is undertaking the construction of large scale infrastructure projects, the Andhra Pradesh state government is also approving various new infrastructure projects.

== GSDP ==
GSDP at current prices for the year 2022-23 is estimated at ₹13,17,728 crore (Advance Estimates) against ₹11,33,837 crore (First Revised Estimates) for the previous year. Agriculture growth rate was 36.19%, Industry 23.36%, and Services 40.45%. The State posted a record growth of 7.02% at Constant Prices (2011–12) against the country’s growth of 7%.

In 2014–15, the state ranked eighth in GSDP at current prices, which stood at ₹5,200.3 billion (US$54 billion). It recorded 12.03% growth compared to previous fiscal which was ₹4,641.84 billion (US$48 billion). While, at constant prices, the GSDP of the state for 2014–15 was ₹2,645.21 billion (US$27 billion), compare to ₹2,467.24 billion (US$26 billion) of 2013–14.

In 2012–13, the Gross State Domestic Product (GSDP) of residual state of Andhra Pradesh post bifurcation at constant prices stood at ₹2,359.3 billion (US$24 billion) and the Gross State Domestic Product at current prices for the same fiscal year stood at ₹4,193.91 billion (US$44 billion). The per capita income of the state increased by 62.6% from ₹25,959 (US$270) (2004–05) to ₹42,186 (US$440) (2012-13).

In December 2025, the Government of Andhra Pradesh reported that the State recorded 11.28% growth in Q2 2025–26, exceeding the national GDP growth rate of 8.7%. The quarterly report noted broad-based gains across agriculture, industry and services, including 12.20% industrial growth supported by increases in mining and power generation. The administration also reported investment commitments exceeding ₹13 lakh crore, while stating that ongoing fiscal reforms were aimed at stabilising public finances following high levels of debt accumulated in previous years. The State’s per capita income reached ₹2,66,240, marginally above the national average.

=== Per capita income ===
The per capita income of Andhra Pradesh at current prices increased to ₹2,37,951 in 2023-24 against ₹2,19,917 in 2022-23.

The per capita income figure gives a better idea of the standard of living of the people. In 2019-20, the state is ranked eighteenth with ₹ 1,69,519 in terms of GDP per capita at current prices. It recorded a growth of 11.17% compared to previous fiscal which was ₹ 1,51,173.

=== Per capita Debt ===
Based on CAG report, as of FY 2021-22, per capita debt inclusive of off-budget debt is at ₹92,797. This is based on budget debt of ₹3,72,503 crores, and off-budget debt of ₹1,18,393 crores.

== Agriculture and livestock ==
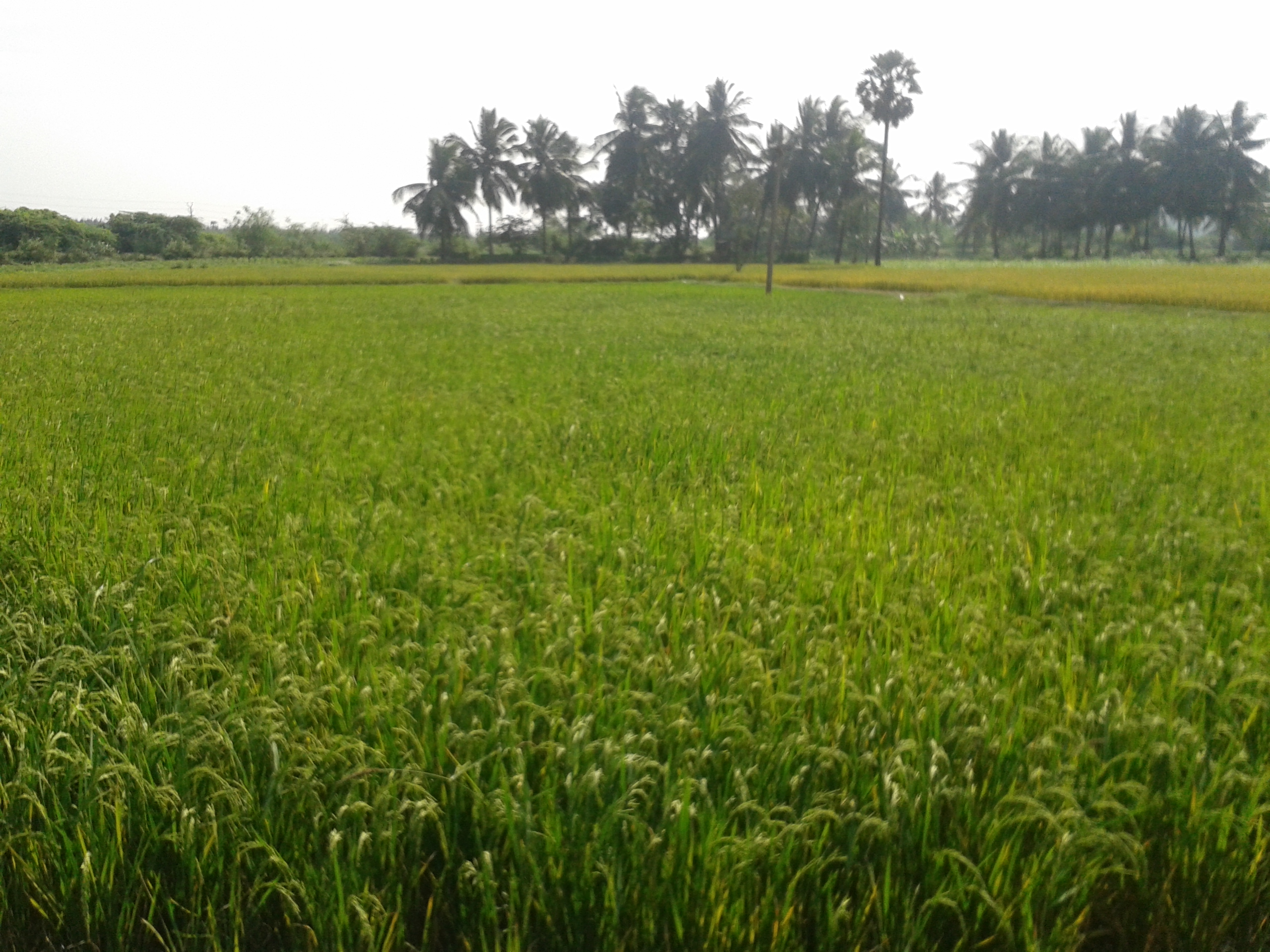
A view of Paddy field

Agriculture has been the main source of income and main occupation for the state with 60% of population engaged in agriculture and related activities. Rice is the major food crop and staple food of the state. Other important crops are sugarcane, cotton, mango, tobacco, Maize, pulses etc. Four important rivers of India, the Godavari, Krishna, Penna, and Tungabhadra flow through the state, providing irrigation. Recently, crops used for vegetable oil production such as sunflower and peanuts have gained favour. There are many multi-state irrigation projects in development, including Godavari River Basin Irrigation Projects and Nagarjuna Sagar Dam.

In the financial year 2023, Andhra Pradesh had a total of 1.64 million hectares of land under horticulture. Among these, fruits accounted for the largest share with 795 thousand hectares, followed by plantation crops, while aromatic and medicinal crops occupied the smallest area.

Andhra Pradesh was among the very few states in the country which went in for the Green Revolution in rice cultivation in the 1970s. Agricultural income in the state was ₹54.599 billion (US$570 million) at constant prices (2012–13).

Given below is a table of 2015 national output share of select agricultural crops and allied segments in Andhra Pradesh based on 2011 prices

Segment	National Share %
Cocoa	70.7
Tobacco leaf & steam	47.6
Marine fish	40.9
Rajma	35.9
Ajwain	34.6
Chilli	34.6
Cow pea	27.7
Muskmelon	22.2
Urd	20.7
Banana	20.0
Lemon	18.5
Sericulture and Apiculture	18.0
Inland fish	15.4
Egg	15.0
Groundnut	13.0
Sapota	12.2
Cashew nut	12.1
Bitter gourd	11.9
Water melon	11.0
Parmal	10.6
Narcotics	10.2
Orange	9.6
Tomato	9.3
Mango	9.2
Meat	9.2
Condiments and spices	8.5
Sunflower	8.3
Moong	8.1
Pomegranate	7.9
Turmeric	7.9
Horsegram	7.7
Pulse	7.7
Cucumber	7.2
Paddy	7.2
Papaya	7.0
Carrot	6.8
Milk	6.7
Jowar	6.6
Mesta	6.4
Maize	6.3
Betel	6.1
Fruit and vegetable	6.1
Oilseed	6.1
Coconut	6.0
Bean	5.5
Kapas	5.2
Tamarind	5.2
Ber	5.1
Floriculture	5.0

=== Aquaculture ===
Aquaculture such as cultivating fish, crustaceans, molluscs, Shrimp production etc., are the major occupations of coastal areas. Andhra Pradesh is the largest producer of shrimp in the country, with 70% of the production from the state itself. The geographical location of the state allows marine fishing as well as inland fish production. Cyclones may do less damage to aquaculture than to crop production. Hence, farmers are getting attracted towards this industry. It grew from ₹3.46 billion (US$36 million) to ₹5.61 billion (US$58 million). The Waterbase Limited is an aquaculture unit located at Nellore, it encourages scientific shrimp farming. Most exported marine exports include Vannamei shrimp.

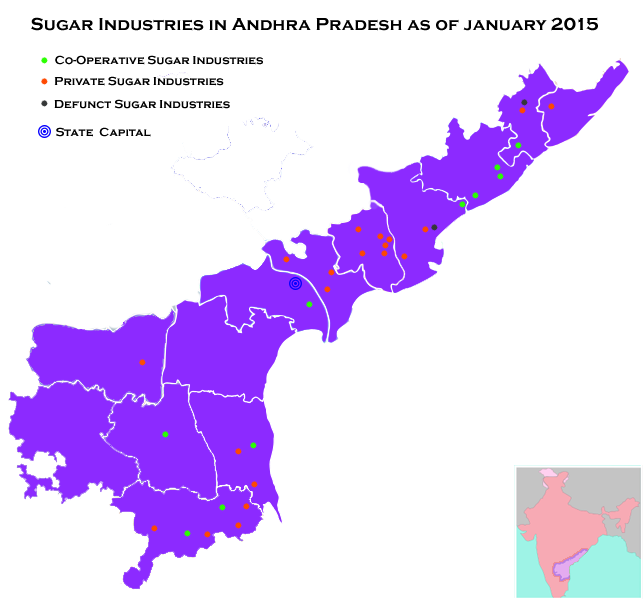
Map of Sugar industries in Andhra Pradesh

=== Horticulture ===
Andhra Pradesh has made significant contributions to India's traditional Horticulture crops cultivation. Increased area and production under Horticultural crops has put Andhra Pradesh in a stronger position in terms of attracting investments from private sector.

Given that area and production of fruits and vegetables have been increasing steadily, Andhra Pradesh has the potential to increase its contribution towards the economy by way of exports There is a voluntary shift in the cropping pattern, as returns from Horticulture per unit of land are higher in comparison to Agriculture. The Horticulture is climate resilient, therefore assures higher income to farmers. Due to changing Socioeconomic profile and increasing middle class coupled with higher per capita income this sector has more potential as food habits are changing and people are becoming more health conscious.

The State has 17.48 Lakhs Ha. Under Horticulture crops with an annual production of 301.73 Lakhs metric tons. Horticulture sector contributes approximately 16.07% to the state GVA.

AREA and PRODUCTION:In Andhra Pradesh area under Horticulture crops is 17.48 lakhs Hectors with a production of 301.73 lakh MTs. Andhra Pradesh stands at 1st position in Chillies, Cocoa, Lime, Oil Palm, Papaya and Tomato, 2nd in Cashew, Mango and Sweet Orange in India. A.P. Ranks 1st in area and production of fruits and spices and 2nd in Micro Irrigation area coverage.

=== Fisheries ===
Andhra Pradesh Fisheries contribute 10% of total fish and shrimp production of India. Accordingly, the government is focussed on developing this huge industry on a large scale. The convenient geographical location of this South Indian state allows marine fishing as well as inland fish production in Andhra Pradesh.The Value of marine products exports from India in 1998 was Rs. 4710 Crores among which the state alone contributed products of Rs. 2000 Crores.This data in itself explains the importance of fisheries in Andhra Pradesh.

Andhra Pradesh constantly tries to increase fish seed production and stocking. For this they are using modern equipments like including the use of satellite data for forecasting movement of Fish shoals. Fishery Rights have been implemented and the government is trying to inspire the labourers to follow scientific fishing techniques that would be promote sustainable development and would be beneficial to all concerned. Issue of separate licenses for fisherman in inland waters and marine fishing crafts are in process.

By 2020, Andhra Pradesh wishes to be a major exporter and provider of highly nutritious food. The central coastal districts of the state have been concentrating on advanced methods of fish production and the farmers are getting encouraged to convert agricultural lands into fresh water fishponds to obtain better yields and also to make full use of fresh water.

Apart from fishing, Andhra Pradesh government is also hoping to develop economically in other ways. Accordingly, the fisheries are developing as sites for recreation amidst the scenic beauty. Activities like boat riding in lakes and reservoirs, establishment of Angling clubs, ornamental fish and aquariums and construction of marine parks are upcoming for additional income.

=== Livestock ===
In order to improve the productivity of the existing livestock, a massive programme of Breed Improvement through door step Artificial insemination is launched by Government of India under the scheme of NPCBB Restructuring of Breeding Operations.

Andhra Pradesh is one of the pioneer states which has taken up "Restructuring of Breeding Operations" by involving farmers organizations by establishing state level autonomous body. APLDA is formed in April 2000, to provide quality inputs and for channelizing inputs to the AI practitioners to take up doorstep AI on self-employment basis. It has taken up a gigantic task to expand AI facilities, to cover entire breedable population aiming at Productivity optimization. APLDA provides animal breeding services at farmer's doorstep, on cost recovery basis, covering total breedable population of 105.83 lakhs cattle and buffaloes belonging to 30 lakh farmers spread over 28245 revenue villages in the state. APLDA is an autonomous organization with specialized objectives.

Genesis APLDA was registered under AP Societies Registrations Act, 1350 Fasli with registration No: 7146 of 1999 dated: 13 October 1999. The government have appointed the chairman and executive committee (EC) members vide G.O Ms No: 85, dated: 2 August 1999. As per AP Reorganization Act 2014, APLDA has been included in Tenth Schedule and the executive committee and general body resolved for division into two separate entities with the names APLDA which started functioning separately since 2 June 2014. APLDA is now extending its operations in thirteen (13) Districts of A.P. State.

Objectives To expand Artificial Insemination to cover entire breedable population at farmer's doorstep aiming at productivity optimization through improved breeding and through a system of recycling of revenue, making it self-sustainable.

To channelize all the inputs needed to provide Artificial Insemination facility.

To regulate and ensure quality control of inputs and services rendered by the field workers.

Capacity building of personnel for effective management.

Functions Production and procurement of quality inputs like Frozen Semen, Liquid Nitrogen, equipment and their timely supply.

Crossbreeding of cattle, up-gradation of buffaloes, maintenance and development of indigenous Germplasm in breeding tracts and assessing the breeding needs.

Maintenance of quality Artificial Insemination services.

Standardizing methodology of AI and designing of training programmes.

Generation of self employment to unemployed rural youth as Gopalamitras.

Training and positioning of the AI Technicians.

Educating the farmers on breeding activities and reproductive management.

Applying the latest technologies & presenting the benefits of advanced research programmes at the doorstep of farmers.

== Industries ==
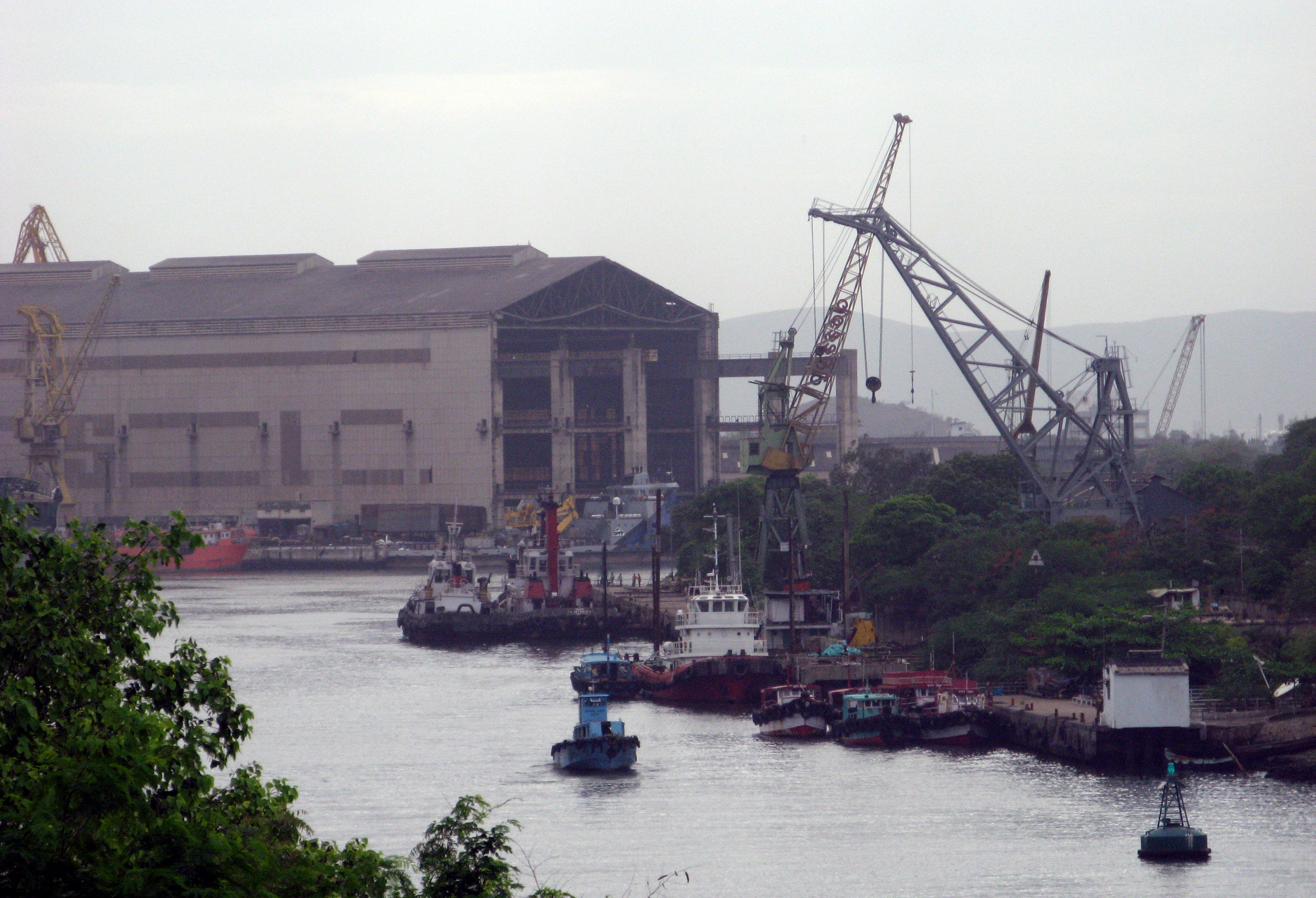
Hindustan Shipyard at Visakhapatnam

The domestic product of Industrial sector accounts for ₹507.45 billion (US$5.3 billion). The state has also started to focus on the fields of information technology and biotechnology. Several major heavy industries are in operation in Visakhapatnam. The state still has to make its mark in Hi-tech engineering. Automobiles and Auto components Industry, spices, mines and minerals, Textiles and apparels, IT industry, Bulk drugs and pharmaceuticals, horticulture, poultry farming are the main industries in Andhra Pradesh.

=== IT/ITeS-software industry ===
The software industry in Andhra Pradesh is conveniently spread out to different cities, namely Visakhapatnam, Tirupati and capital city of Vijayawada, and not clustered just in the capital, leading to so many social, economic and political problems. Most software companies in Andhra Pradesh are out of state or foreign companies which are also called multinational corporations. Domestic software industry in Andhra Pradesh seems to be at its beginning stages.

In May 2021 the Government of Andhra Pradesh released the Andhra Pradesh IT Electronics Policy 2021–24, aimed at creating a world-class electronics manufacturing infrastructure. In a release, Principal Secretary (Information Technology, Electronics and Communications) said that the policy is envisioned to transform Andhra Pradesh into a hub of IT and Electronics. Software companies with facilities in Andhra Pradesh, as well as country of headquarters:

- Fluentgrid - India
- Cyient - India
- HSBC-GLT - United Kingdom
- IBM - United States
- Tech Mahindra - India
- Wipro Technologies - India
- Infosys - India
- Pulsus Group - United Kingdom
- Conduent - United States
- WNS Global Services - United States
- HCL Technologies - India

==== Software companies in Visakhapatnam ====
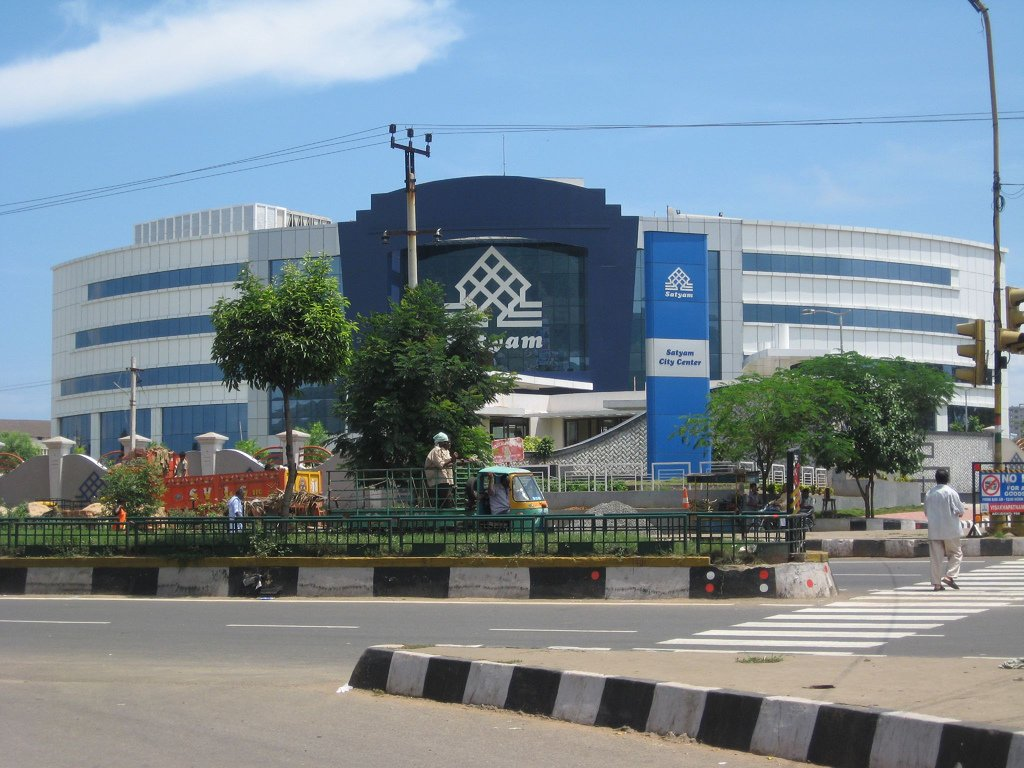
Tech Mahindra Development Centre

The ITES and IT sector is growing at its pace in the city of Visakhapatnam, the generated revenue from these sectors are a boon to the economy. The IT special economic zone and incubation center exists at Rushikonda Hills, of the city. There are many national and multi–national IT/ITes and banking firms such as Mahindra Satyam, Pulsus Group, Wipro, Fluentgrid, Kenexa, IBM, and Sutherland. Software exports from Visakhapatnam have increased by nearly 90% each year. The IT exports from the city for 2012 were ₹1,200 crore and 16,000 people were employed. According to data released by the state IT department for the financial year 2012–13, IT industry registered IT/ITES revenues of ₹1,445 crore (US$150 million), an increase of 20%, compared to the previous financial year. The same year saw an increase in employment, generated by the IT/ITeS industry, with 20000 jobs as compared to 16,000 in 2011–12 period. The Information Technology Investment Region (ITIR) project, planned by the Government of Andhra Pradesh, may generate employment to approximately, up to 15 lakh IT professionals and also the it can generate revenue for the economy, of up to ₹3.11 crore (US$320,000).

Other IT/ITes and fintech firms include Conduent, Cyient, Paytm, Concentrix, and Franklin Templeton at Fintech Valley in the city. Conduent has highest employees in India, third largest outside United States and operating from NCR (Noida and Gurgaon), Bangalore, Hyderabad, Kochi and majorly from Visakhapatnam.

==== Software companies in Tirupathi ====
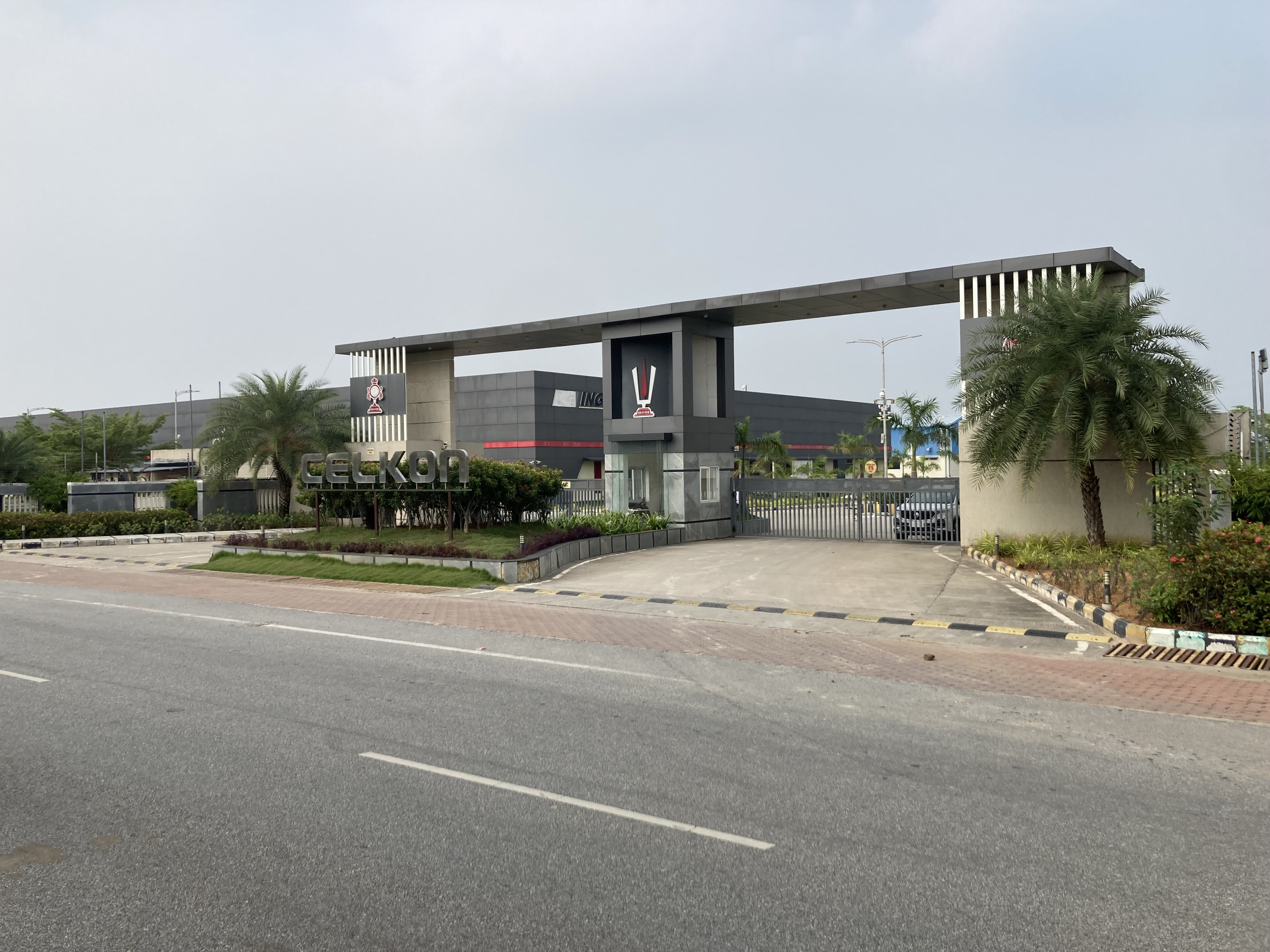
CELKON Manufacturing plant at Tirupati

Sri Venkateshwara Mobile and Electronics Manufacturing Hub is a dedicated mobile handset and electronics manufacturing facility located at Tirupati. The hub is spread over 122 acres (49 ha) out of which Celkon is established in 20 acres (8.1 ha), Micromax in 15 acres (6.1 ha), Karbonn in 15.28 acres (6.18 ha) and Lava in 20 acres (8.1 ha) with a total investment of rupees 2000 crores. Dixon Technologies has a manufacturing unit in this hub, where they are producing Smart TVs for Xiaomi. and is the hub for several software companies including Zoho Corporation, Software Technology Parks of India has its regional office at Tirupathi to monitor local software industry.

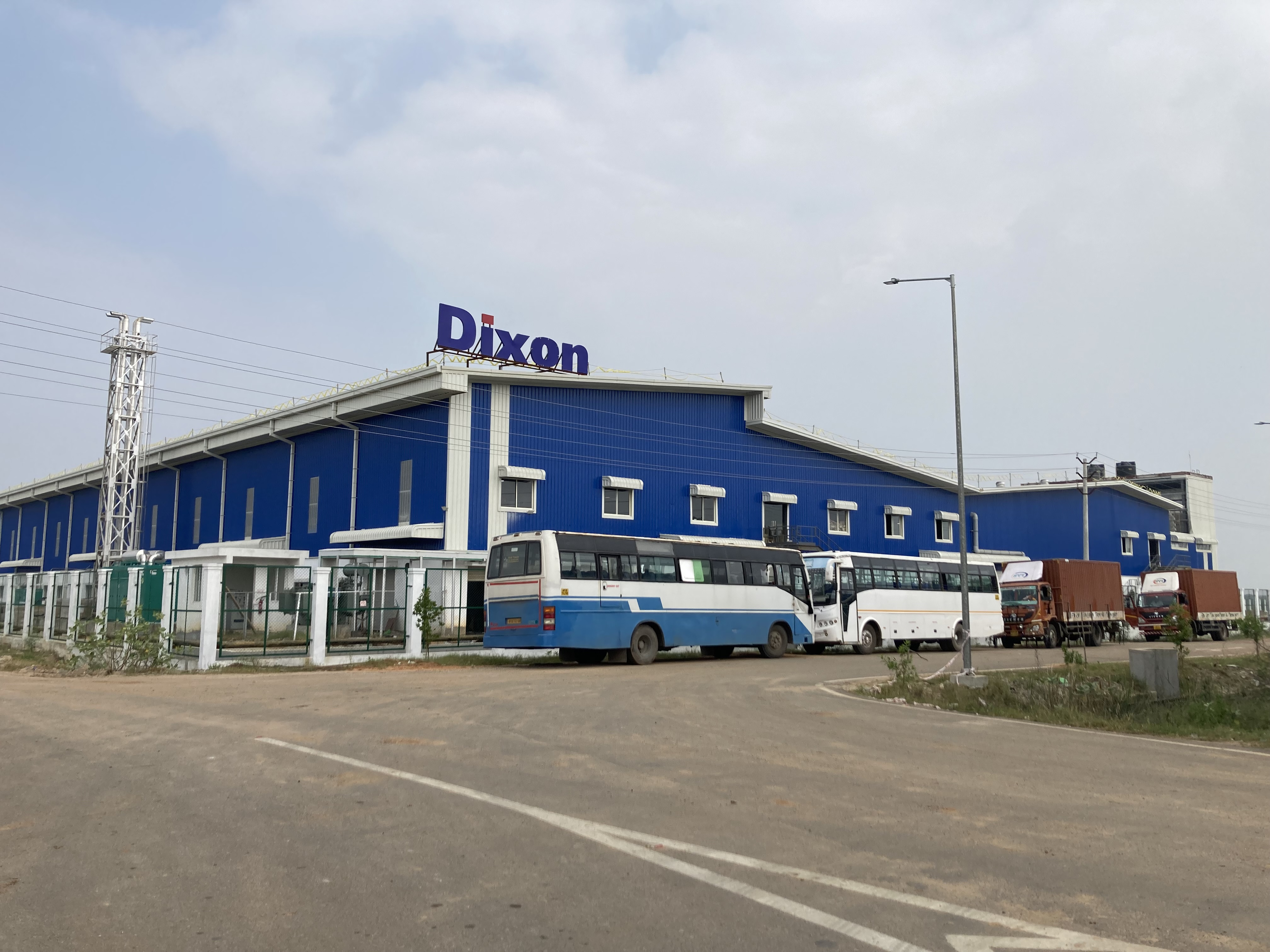
DIXON Facility at APIIC EMC Tpty

==== Sunrise Startup Village ====
Startup Village is a not-for-profit business incubator based out of Kochi has set up a similar incubation facility in Visakhapatnam, Andhra Pradesh with the name Sunrise startup village. The organisation aimed to launch 1,000 technology startups over the next ten years and start the search for the next billion-dollar Indian company. It focusses primarily on student startups and telecom innovation. It is India's first incubator that is funded jointly by the public and private sectors.

=== Automobile industry ===
Kia Motors India - Penukonda

Isuzu Motors India - Sri City

Hero MotoCorp - Sri City

== Infrastructure ==
=== Transportation ===
==== Roadways ====
Road transport remains the primary mode of transport in the state. The state is criss-crossed by 5,293.43 km of National Highways and 15,406 km of State Highways. The National Highway 16, which is a part of the Golden Quadrilateral passes through the state from north to south and is at the centre of the road network. The National Highways are developed and maintained by NHAI while the state highways and other roads are maintained by the Andhra Pradesh Road Development Corporation. The state has a road density of 32.82 km/km^{2}, higher than the national average of 30.45 km/km^{2}. Andhra Pradesh State Road Transport Corporation operates buses that form the primary mode of transport across the state. As of March 2017, there are 11,962 buses in operation.

The roadway network of the state of Andhra Pradesh covers an overall span of 91,313 miles or 146,954 km. The state public works department has the responsibility of looking after the roadway transportation system of the state of Andhra Pradesh. The road transportation network of Andhra Pradesh is made up of the following:

- National Highways (covering 2,949 km or 1,832 miles)
- State Highways (spanning 42,511 km or 26,415 miles)
- District Roads (covering 101,484 km or 63,059 miles)

The development rate for car proprietorship in the state is the maximum in India and stands at 16 percent.

==== Railways ====
Andhra Pradesh has a total broad gauge railway route of 3703.25 km and has no metre gauge railway. The rail density of the state is 16.59 per 1,000 km (620 mi), compared to an all India average of 20. The Howrah–Chennai main line which runs through the state is proposed to be upgraded into a high-speed rail corridor through the Diamond Quadrilateral project of the Indian Railways.

There are three A1 and twenty three A-category railway stations in the state. Visakhapatnam railway station has been declared the cleanest railway station in the country. The railway station of Shimiliguda was the first highest broad gauge railway station in the country. Three iconic bridges that span the river Godavari - the decommissioned Old Godavari Bridge, the Godavari bridge and the new Godavari Arch bridge are widely regarded as architectural and engineering marvels of the state.

==== Air transport ====
There are three international airports in the state at Tirupati, Visakhapatnam and Vijayawada. There are domestic airports at Kadapa, Kurnool, Rajamundry and a private airport at Puttaparti. The government is planning to develop new greenfield airports at Amaravati, Srikakulam and Kuppam. The new domestic airport at Dagadarthi also being planned.

==== Water transport ====
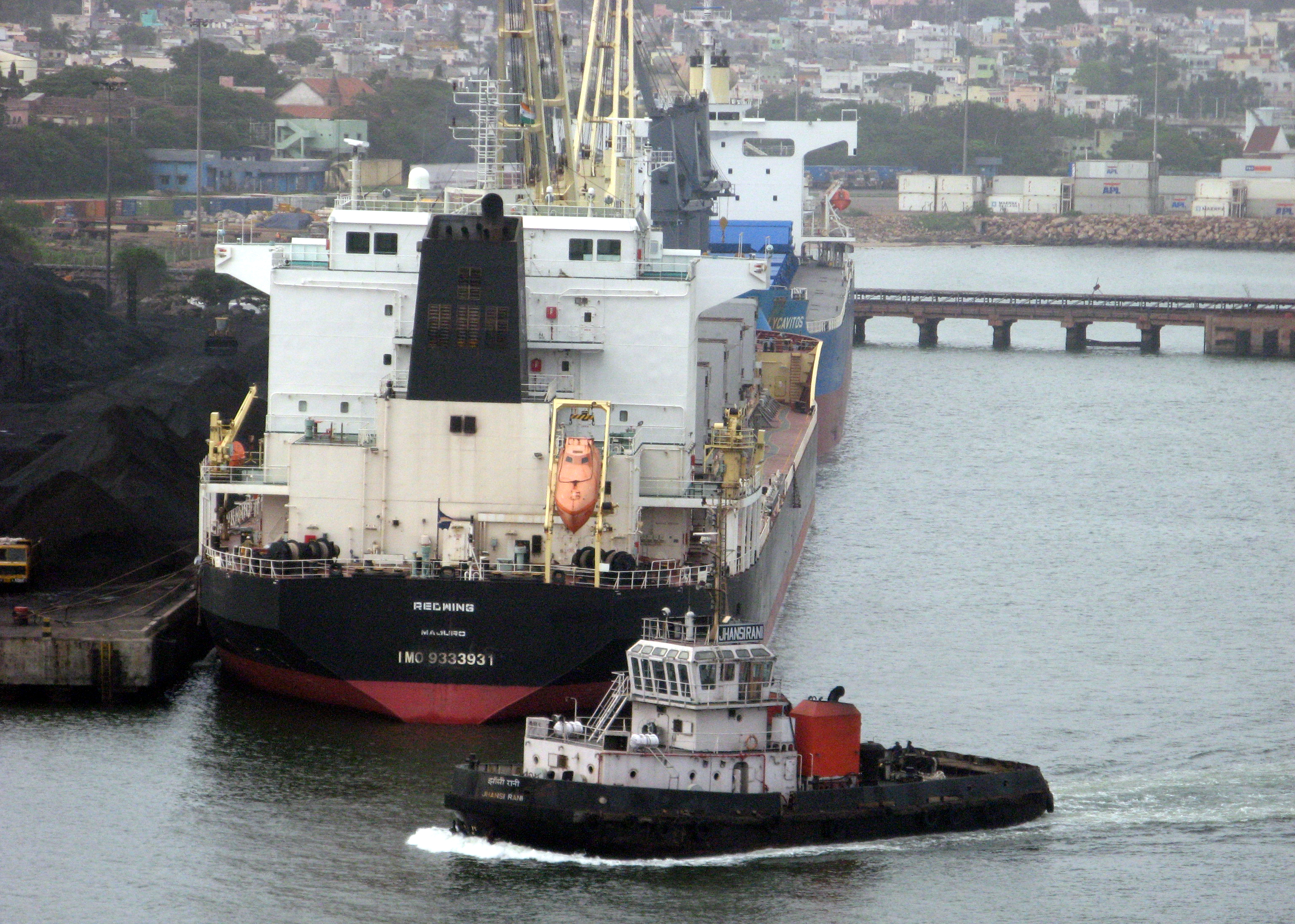
Ship at Visakhapatnam seaport

Andhra Pradesh has the second longest coastline in the country and the longest coastline on the eastern coast. Vishakapatnam Port, a major port operated by the central government is the fifth busiest port in the country. Keeping in mind shift of trade towards India's eastern coast, the government is developing 14 non-major ports in the state, out of which five are operational. There is a huge scope for inland water transportation in the state through the network of river interlinking canals that are being developed. However, the current status of it is minimal. The Ministry of Ports, Shipping and Waterways has received 29 new proposals from the Andhra Pradesh state government for projects in 2024, including port development, coastal berths, and fish landing centers.

=== Communication ===
The latest available statistics (as in 2001) show that there were 3003 Telephone exchanges, 3140948 telephone connections, 118 telegraph offices (excluding extension counters, telecom centres, and combined offices) and 78218 public telephones. As at November 2020, According to Telecom Regulatory Authority of India it is estimated that there are 87.47 Million Wireless Subscriber Base and 1.38 Million Wireline Subscriber Base in the state with a tele density of 98.31%. According to Department of Telecommunication as on 31 August 2020 The State has a share of 7.53% in All India cell phone subscribers.

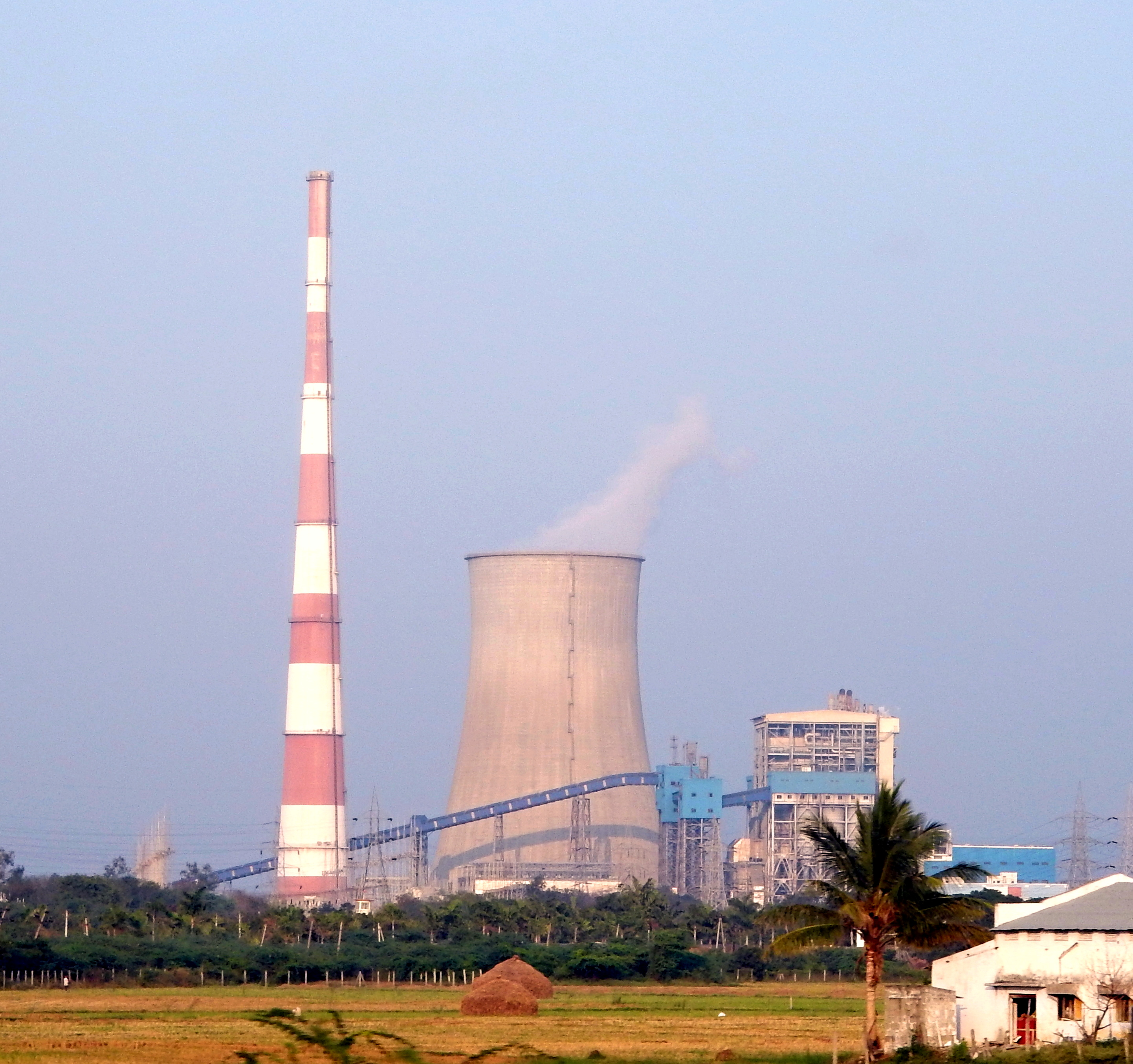
Dr Narla Tata Rao Thermal Power Station

APSFL is a whole owned government of Andhra Pradesh enterprise which provides telephone, internet and television to residents in Andhra Pradesh.

=== Banking and finance ===
The banking and finance sector of Andhra Pradesh constitute the key commercial activities that enhance the growth and stability of the state's economy. The spectrum of the sectors range from core Banking transactions like deposit and withdrawal to financial operations like retail Banking, loans and investments schemes.

The banking sector comprises a widespread network of branches and counters from where the facilities of monetary transactions are offered to the people. From commercial companies to individuals, the government recognized and private Banks of the place provide prompt, efficient and accurate services to all. Some of the important Banking institutions that dominate the fiscal structure of Andhra Pradesh are:

- Andhra Bank
- State Bank of India
- Allahabad Bank
- Bank of Baroda
- BM Deena Bank
- Balaji Urban co-operative Bank

The finance sector of Andhra Pradesh is involved in improvement of the poor financial scenario of the rural corners of the place. The State Financial Corporation comprises a number of Finance companies that offer convenient monetary services especially to the less privileged section of the society. With diverse range of flexible deposit schemes, these financial institutions also provide wide array of fiscal services to the local people.

The co-operative financial organizations set up in both the urban as well as rural parts of the state helps in strengthening the core base of the economic infrastructure. The sole aim of all the banks and financial institutions is to promote the existing industries and improve the living standards of individuals of the place.

Collectively, the banking and finance industry of Andhra Pradesh work towards the betterment of the economic viability of the state.

=== Industrial estates ===
The state has 19 operational special economic zones (SEZs). There are 272 Industrial estates and industrial development areas in the State, covering an area of 14700 hectares. The State Government is in the process of developing Industrial Parks at different places, for specific groups of industries like Visakhapatnam Export Processing Zone.

Food parks, one each in the two regions of coastal Andhra (value added rice products, dairy, horticultural, marine etc.); and in Rayalseema region (processing of vegetables, edible oils and export oriented industry). Agri Export Zones for the following produce are proposed at the places mentioned against them:

- Red Chilli – Guntur district,
- Mangoes – Krishna district,
- Silk – Hindupur,
- Mango pulp and fresh vegetables – Chittoor

== Exports ==
Tentative estimates reveal that the total exports from AP during the year 2003–04 were to the tune of ₹15,306 crore. The share of software was 30%, and that of food products was 20%. The value of exports during 2002–03 was ₹13,614 crore and that during 2001–02 was ₹12,400 crore.

== Resources ==
Gross state domestic product(GSDP) of industries was estimated at US$137.3 billion for 2012–13. Andhra Pradesh is one of the store houses of mineral resources with large deposits of Chrysotile, mica Asbestos, barytes and limestone in India. It accounts for about 93% of total production of Barytes in India.

Andhra Pradesh has varied geological formations with a rich variety of industrial minerals and building stones. Other important minerals in the state are copper ore, manganese, mica, coal and limestone. Minerals like coal, oil and Natural gas, barytes, Limestone, diamond, gold beach sand bauxite, ball clay fire clay, dolomite, dimensional stones etc. are still under tapped or untapped. The wide variety of minerals from the State is being traded or consumed in Power, Metals, Alloys, Cement, Chemicals, Paint, Cosmetic, Glass, Ceramics, Refractory, Refinery and manufacture of various down stream industries.

Minerals found in the state include limestone, reserves of Oil and Natural Gas, Manganese, Asbestos, Iron Ore, Ball Clay, Fire Clay, Gold Diamonds, Graphite, Dolomite, Quartz, Tungsten, Steatitic, Feldspar, Silica Sand etc. It has about one third of India's limestone reserves and is known for large exclusive deposits of Barytes and Galaxy granite in the international market.

=== Mining ===
Mining is identified as one of the growth engines for the overall development of industry and infrastructure. The Tummalapalle Uranium mine in Andhra has confirmed 49,000 tonnes of ore and there are indications that it could hold reserves totaling three times its current size. 700 million tonnes of metal grade Bauxite deposits in close proximity to Visakhapatnam Port.

=== Power ===
The state is a pioneer nationwide in hydro electricity generation, encouraging privates sector in power generation and efficient use of its coal based thermal power stations. The state has become power surplus with excess power generation being exported to other states.

Thermal (natural gas and coal based) and renewable power plants totalling to 21,000 MW are installed in the state by the year 2015. Thermal power plants with total capacity of 9,155 MW are situated in the state which includes Simhadri Super Thermal Power Plant (2000 MW) of NTPC, Rayalaseema Thermal Power Station (1050 MW), Sri Damodaram Sanjeevaiah Thermal Power Station (1600 MW), Vijayawada Thermal Power Plant (1760 MW), etc. Hydel power plants are having a capacity of 1798 MW.

== Tourism ==
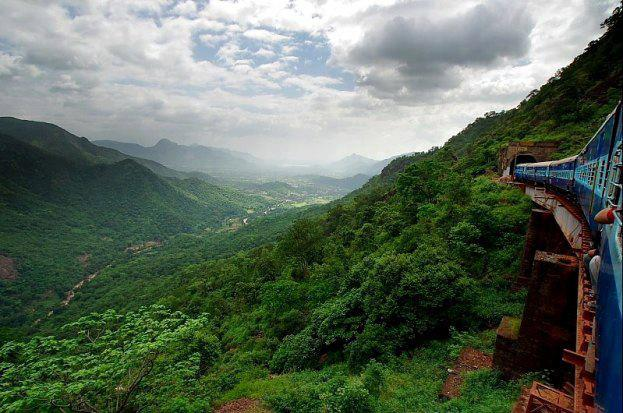
Araku Valley View

The state provides a budget for tourism, financially supporting various projects. The state has helped develop religious tourism via the State Tourism Department (APTDC). Some of the famous destinations are Tirumala, Srisailam, Sri Kalahasti, Puttaparthi, Lepakshi, etc. Tirupathi is one of the major source of income in the tourism segment because of the abode of Sri Venkateswara (Lord Venkateshwara). The temple is one of the richest in the world in terms of donations received. Other important sources of income come from the developing tourism centres at Visakhapatnam, Vijayawada.

== Economic timeline ==
=== Economic changes during 1954–1983 ===
This can be called the 29-year era of 12 centrally nominated chief ministers. Excluding Kasu Brahmananda Reddy term (7 years), average tenure of a chief minister was less than two years. The cumulative growth during this 30-year period for Indian economy is 311%, and for Andhra Pradesh it was 138%.

=== Economic changes during the 1980s ===
An academic study of Andhra's economic activity using official data collected by the state government of Andhra Pradesh, Govt of India and World Bank reveal the following highlights.

1. A Domestic Demand – Supply based economic policy instead of exports oriented policies during this pre-liberalization period resulted in Constant Currency (inflation adjusted) cumulative growth rates of 151% in seven years, one and half times higher than the cumulative growth rate of the 31 years earlier, and 25% higher than the cumulative growth rates of 20 years that followed.
2. Education reforms, local government empowerment, irrigation and electricity improvements, corruption controls of this period resulted in cumulative per capita income growth rates (corrected to inflation and population growth) ten times the growth rates for the first 30 years and three times the rates of the 20 years that followed. On average a typical Andhra resident was 3000% more productive in improving his/her economic condition than in the 30 years earlier and 450% more productive than the 20 years that followed.
3. Distributional and social indicators (rural education 51%, child labor (−60%), malnutrition (−81%), infant mortality (−37%), female education (77%)) improved at rates that are yet to be repeated.
4. Fiscal Management Indices (deficit, foreign debt, debt servicing levels, etc.) were at their best levels compared to the era the followed when central government allowed higher deficit targets and allowed foreign borrowing directly from world bank as a part of the liberalisation regime.

== Monsoon effect ==
Since the backbone of economy of Andhra Pradesh is Agriculture, any drastic changes in Monsoon would affect GDP of the state.

== State debt ==
The state of Andhra Pradesh has a total public debt created by Government of Andhra Pradesh which is equal to 3,73,140 crores as of Nov 2020 as per the CAG report. This is approximately equal to a public debt of Rs.7175 per citizen assuming a population of 5.2 crores or 52 million in year 2021. The public debt per citizen accumulated because of Union of India is approximately Rs. 32371.61 for total external debt of India of about $570 billion for a population of 130 crores (1.3 billion) of all states and union territories in year 2021.

The economy of Andhra Pradesh badly hit due to coronavirus. For the first quarter of current financial, only Rs 6,095 cr revenue achieved out of the expected Rs 13,425 cr. This is a big shortfall. The revenue achieved up to June 2020 is only around 45.39%, according to the officials in the Finance Department Secretariat.

== Bibliography ==
Planning department (2023). Socio Economic Survey 2022-23 (PDF). Archived from the original (PDF) on 28 March 2024.
