= AEZ =

AEZ may refer to:

- Aeka language
- AEZ Zakakiou
- Agri Export Zone
- FAO Agro-Ecological Zones
- AEZ Railcar, an electric multiple unit of Chilean state railways, EFE
