= Fluentgrid =

Indian software company

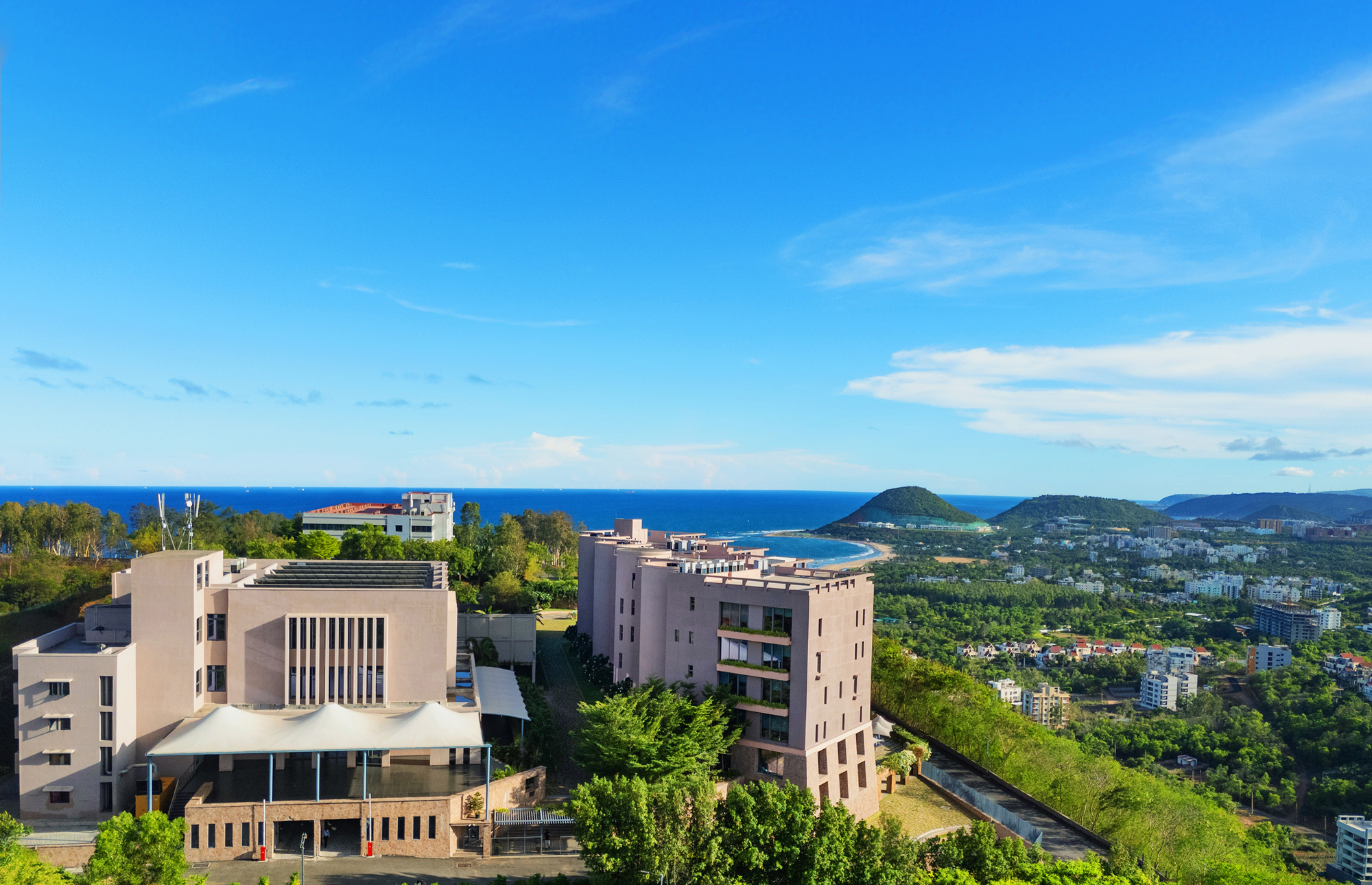
- Corporate Office and Global R&D Center of Fluentgrid in Visakhapatnam
- Formerly: Phoenix IT Solutions
- Type: Public
- Industry: Information technology
- Founded: December 4, 1998; 27 years ago
- Founder: Murali Krishna Gannamani
- Headquarters: Visakhapatnam, Andhra Pradesh, India
- Area served: Worldwide
- Key people: Murali Krishna Gannamani (Managing Director & CEO)
- Services: Utility IT solutions including customer billing, smart metering, analytics, ERP, and smart city platforms
- Revenue: ₹202.15 crore (total operating income) (2025)
- Website: www.fluentgrid.com

Fluentgrid Limited (formerly Phoenix IT Solutions Limited) is an Indian enterprise software company headquartered in Visakhapatnam, Andhra Pradesh, that develops digital platforms for electricity, water and gas utilities, as well as smart city and public infrastructure projects. Founded on 4 December 1998 by Murali Krishna Gannamani, the company operated as Phoenix IT Solutions Limited until adopting its current name in December 2015.

Its software has been deployed in utility and public-sector digital transformation projects, including the Integrated Command and Control Centre (ICCC) for the Greater Visakhapatnam Municipal Corporation (GVMC), a cloud-based customer billing platform for Uttar Pradesh Power Corporation Limited (UPPCL), and COVID-19 response systems developed for the Visakhapatnam district administration in 2020.

The company has received industry recognition including the IBM Beacon Award (2012) and the Fierce Innovation Award for Energy (2015). Its software development organisation achieved Capability Maturity Model Integration (CMMI) Maturity Level 5 in 2017, and in 2025 Fluentgrid was recognised as a Major Player in the International Data Corporation (IDC) MarketScape assessment of worldwide utility meter data management system vendors.

== History ==
=== Foundation and early years (1998–2001) ===
Fluentgrid was founded on 4 December 1998 by Murali Krishna Gannamani in Visakhapatnam as Phoenix Cybertech (India) Private Limited, initially providing software and information technology services for electricity distribution utilities. In 2001, the company was converted into a public limited company and renamed Phoenix IT Solutions Limited.

=== Rebranding and growth (2002–2015) ===
During the 2000s, the company expanded its software offerings for utility and infrastructure sectors. In 2012, it received the IBM Beacon Award for Best Industry Solution for Energy and Utilities at the IBM PartnerWorld Leadership Conference. On 16 December 2015, following approval from the Ministry of Corporate Affairs, the company was renamed Fluentgrid Limited. The rebranding reflected its focus on digital technologies for utilities and urban infrastructure. Later that year, it received the Fierce Innovation Award in the Energy category.

=== Recent developments (2016–present) ===
In 2016, Fluentgrid was recognised in the Deloitte Technology Fast 50 India programme and was subsequently included in the Deloitte Technology Fast 500 Asia Pacific ranking.

Its software development organisation achieved Capability Maturity Model Integration (CMMI) Maturity Level 5 in 2017. During the COVID-19 pandemic, the company developed digital systems to support testing, isolation management and emergency response for the Visakhapatnam district administration.

In 2021, Fluentgrid became a participant in the United Nations Global Compact. In 2025, International Data Corporation (IDC) MarketScape named the company a Major Player in its worldwide utility meter data management systems vendor assessment.

== Business overview ==
Fluentgrid develops enterprise software for electricity, water and gas utilities, municipal authorities and other public sector infrastructure organisations. Its software portfolio includes customer information and billing systems, smart metering, meter data management, outage management, enterprise asset management (EAM), and integrated command-and-control platforms for smart cities, marketed under the brand name Actilligence.

The company's principal customers include electricity distribution utilities, municipal corporations and government agencies in India, together with projects in international markets. Its business comprises software licensing, systems integration, managed services, cloud-based deployments and annual maintenance contracts.

Fluentgrid is headquartered in Visakhapatnam, Andhra Pradesh, where it operates its principal research and development centre. The company is part of the state's information technology industry. According to the company's corporate profile, its software has been deployed in more than 20 countries across over 50 utilities and cities.

== Notable projects ==
Fluentgrid has implemented software platforms for utility and smart-city projects in India.

The company developed the Integrated Command and Control Centre (ICCC) for the Greater Visakhapatnam Municipal Corporation, supporting city operations and emergency management. The facility was visited by then United States Ambassador to India Kenneth I. Juster during his official visit to Visakhapatnam in 2019.

For Uttar Pradesh Power Corporation Limited (UPPCL), Fluentgrid implemented a cloud-based customer information and billing platform. The project was shortlisted in the Cloud Migration category at the Data Center Dynamics (DCD) Global Awards in 2018.

Under the Government of India's Smart Cities Mission, Lucknow Smart City Limited awarded a consortium of Fluentgrid and Bharat Electronics Limited the contract to implement the city's Integrated Command and Control Centre (ICCC), Geographic Information System (GIS) and citizen engagement platform.

In 2019, a consortium comprising Fluentgrid and Bharat Electronics Limited was selected as the master system integrator for the Integrated Command, Control and Communication Centre (IC4) developed for Cochin Smart Mission Limited in Kochi, Kerala.

In 2021, Fluentgrid implemented a digital consumer electricity billing platform for Odisha Power Transmission Corporation Limited (OPTCL) as part of the utility's service modernisation programme.

== Research and development ==
Fluentgrid operates an in-house research and development centre in Visakhapatnam. In 2017, its software development organisation was appraised at Capability Maturity Model Integration (CMMI) Maturity Level 5. The company's research and development centre is recognised by the Department of Scientific and Industrial Research (DSIR), Government of India, as an in-house research and development unit.

== Awards and recognition ==
Year	Award or recognition	Ref.
2012	IBM Beacon Award – Best Industry Solution for Energy & Utilities	
2013	NASSCOM Business Innovation Award – Special Recognition (Business Innovation)	
2015	Fierce Innovation Award – Energy category	
2016	Ranked 14th in Deloitte Technology Fast 50 India	
2016	Included in Deloitte Technology Fast 500 Asia Pacific	
2017	Smart Cities India Award – Safe City category (Safe Greater Visakhapatnam project)	
2018	Data Center Dynamics (DCD) APAC Award – Cloud Migration of the Year (UPPCL project)	
2019	ET Now "Making of Developed India" (MODI) Awards – Consumer Mobile Service App and Innovative Mobile App categories	
2019	VCCI Excellence Award – Digital Technology (Large Scale category)	
2020	India Smart Grid Forum Innovation Award – Best Smart Grid Project in India by a Technology Company	
2021	India Smart Grid Forum Innovation Award – Adoption of Emerging Technology by a Utility	
2022	India Smart Grid Forum Innovation Award – Certificate of Merit (Smart Technology – Electricity Distribution)	
2022	Participant of the United Nations Global Compact	

== Corporate affairs ==
=== Governance ===
Fluentgrid is a public company incorporated under the Companies Act, 2013, and is governed by a board of directors. The company files statutory and financial disclosures with India's Ministry of Corporate Affairs.

=== Leadership ===
Fluentgrid was founded by Murali Krishna Gannamani, who serves as its Managing Director and Chief Executive Officer. He served as Chairman of the Confederation of Indian Industry (CII), Andhra Pradesh, for the 2025–26 term, having previously chaired the organisation's Visakhapatnam Zone.

=== Memberships and community initiatives ===
Fluentgrid has participated in the United Nations Global Compact since 2021 and is a member of industry associations including the Confederation of Indian Industry (CII) and the India Smart Grid Forum (ISGF).

The company's corporate social responsibility initiatives are undertaken through the Ananda CitYzen Trust. Among its projects is a community-led smart neighbourhood programme in Kirlampudi Layout, Visakhapatnam, developed in partnership with local residents.

== Financial overview ==
For the financial year ended 31 March 2025, Fluentgrid reported total operating income of approximately ₹202.15 crore, according to CARE Ratings and Infomerics Valuation and Rating Pvt. Ltd.

== See also ==
- Advanced Metering Infrastructure
- Customer information system
- Meter data management
- Enterprise asset management
- Smart grid
- Smart city
- Utility software
- Enterprise software
