= AEZ railcar =

Type of train used in Chile

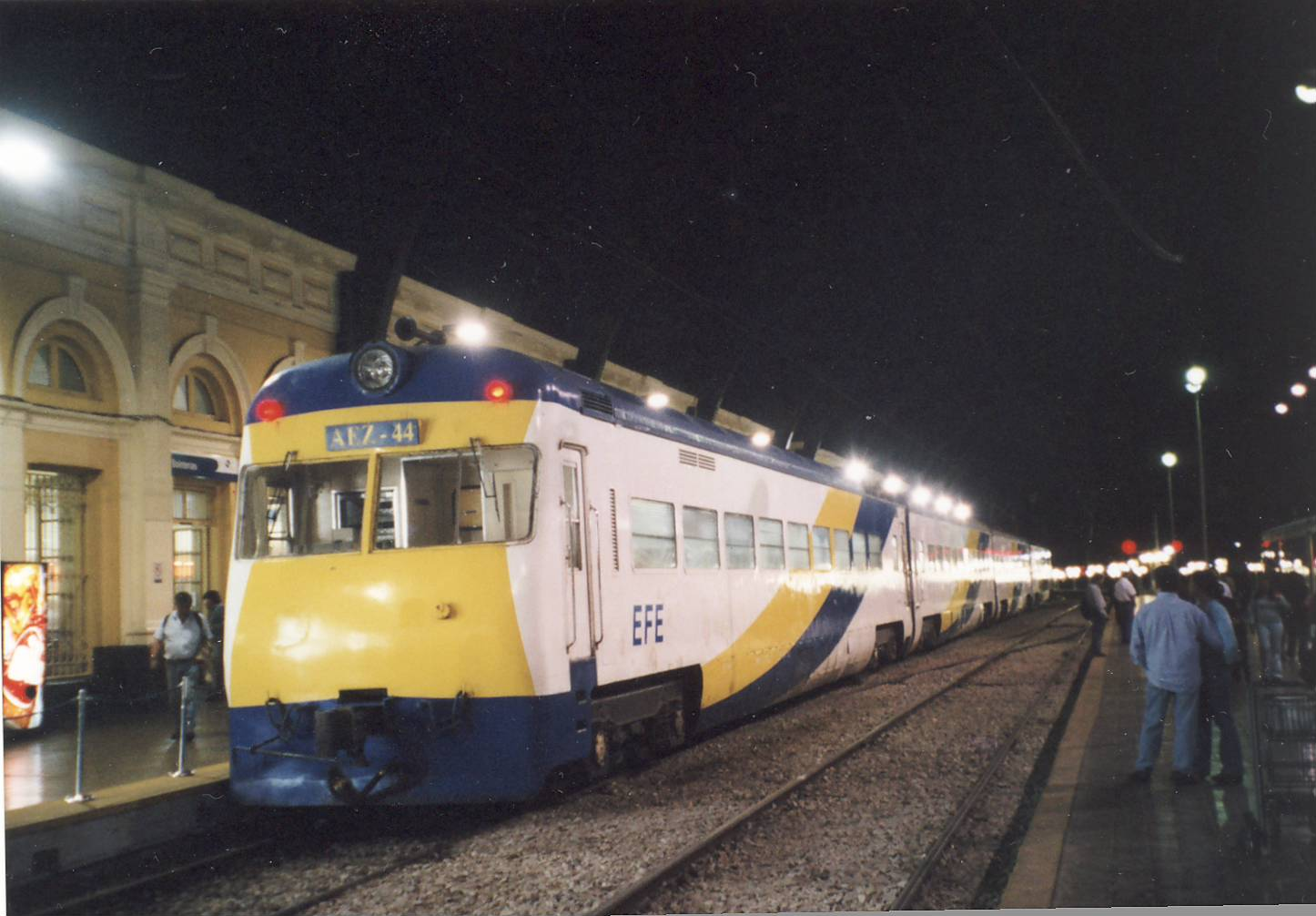
- An AEZ in Santiago, November 2002

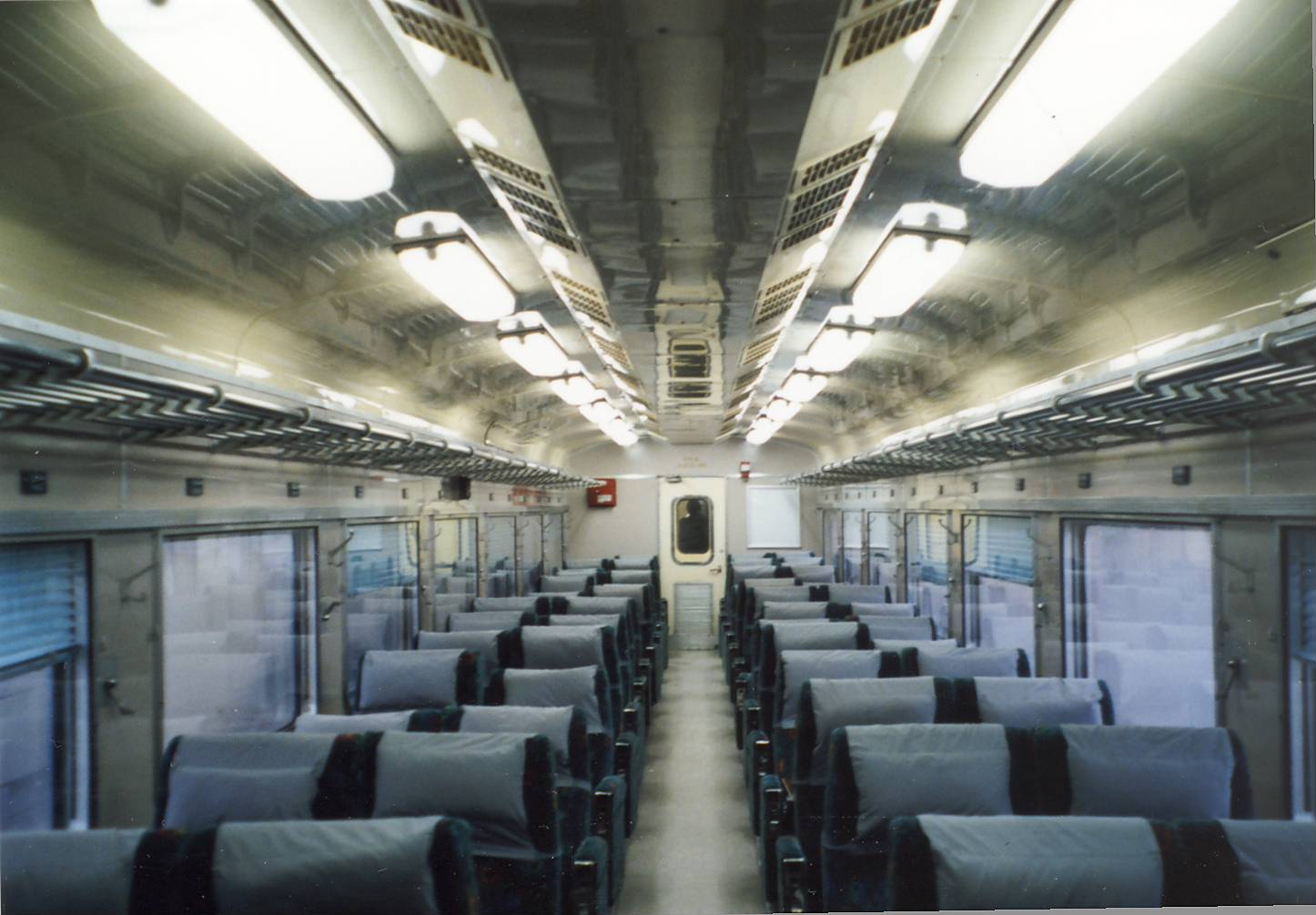
- the interior of an AEZ
- Manufacturers: Kawasaki; Hitachi
- Entered service: 1973
- Number built: 6
- Number in service: 4 (stored, but operational)
- Number scrapped: 2
- Capacity: 252 (seated)
- Operator: EFE

Specifications
- Train length: 102.8 m
- Maximum speed: 160–180 km/h
- Traction motors: 8
- Power supply: 3,000 V DC
- Current collection: pantograph
- Track gauge: 1,676 mm

The AEZ railcar is a self-propelled, electric, multiple-unit train used by the state railway of Chile, Empresa de los Ferrocarriles del Estado (EFE). The railcars were used to service the electrified sections of line between Santiago, Valparaiso, Chillán, and Concepción, as well as used occasionally to service Temuco and Osorno. Six units were built and were numbered AEZ-41 to AEZ-46.

== Routes and services ==
The units were built and introduced into service in 1973 and are now over 50 years old. When they were introduced, electrification only reached Laja and the units were hauled by a diesel locomotive to electrified sections such as Temuco. A generator car was attached to operate interior lights and air conditioning. The AEZ units were popular among passengers due their speed and comfort. Because of their Japanese origin, they became known as the Japanese Train. They were often assigned to the Santiago–Chillán day service (398 km) which took five hours until they were replaced by the second hand Spanish UTS-444 electric units in 2002. The AEZ railcars were often used on the Santiago–Talcahuano service (Automotive to Talcahuano) from 1994 until the suspension of this service in 2007. The AEZ railcars were used on the Santiago–Talca route and on infrequent runs to Osorno and Temuco. Due to the 2010 earthquake, electrification was cut back to Chillán, isolating the section from Laja to Talcahuano. If the AEZ units were to run beyond Chillán, they would require a diesel locomotive once more. Repairs to the electrified rails have not been completed and, because there is little use of the line by electric trains south of Laja, will not likely be repaired in future.

== Amenities ==
The units were made up of four cars. The cars at either end were driving cars. The units had air conditioning, reclining seats, and a bar car. The AEZ railcars were known for speed, comfort, and style.

== Accidents and incidents ==
- 8 May 2003 – AEZ-43 collided with a truck carrying a backhoe at the Gultro level crossing in Rancagua which destroyed the truck and caused severe damage to the driving car. There were no injuries and AEZ-43 was repaired and returned to service.

== Current status ==
Two out of the six units built (AEZ-45 and AEZ-46) have been scrapped, and the driving car of AEZ-43 was scrapped due to accident damage. The driving car of AEZ-43 was later replaced by a driving car from AEZ-46. The four remaining units were refurbished in the early 2000s with a new interior and paint scheme. They are no longer in regular service, and all four remaining units are stored at San Eugenio depot, in Santiago. The AEZ railcars are occasionally use for enthusiast specials or to cover for trains that are out of service.
