= Sri Venkateswara Mobile and Electronics Manufacturing Hub =

Indian manufacturing hub

Sri Venkateswara Mobile and Electronics Manufacturing Hub is a dedicated mobile handset and electronics manufacturing facility located at Tirupati in Andhra Pradesh, India. Its foundation stone was laid by Prime Minister of India Narendra Modi along with Andhra Pradesh Governor E.S.L. Narasimhan, Chief Minister N. Chandrababu Naidu and central minister M. Venkaiah Naidu on 22 October 2015. It is spread over 120 acres and is expected to create 10000 jobs with an investment of 2000 crores. The hub is also planned to facilitate manufacturers of Headphones and adaptors.

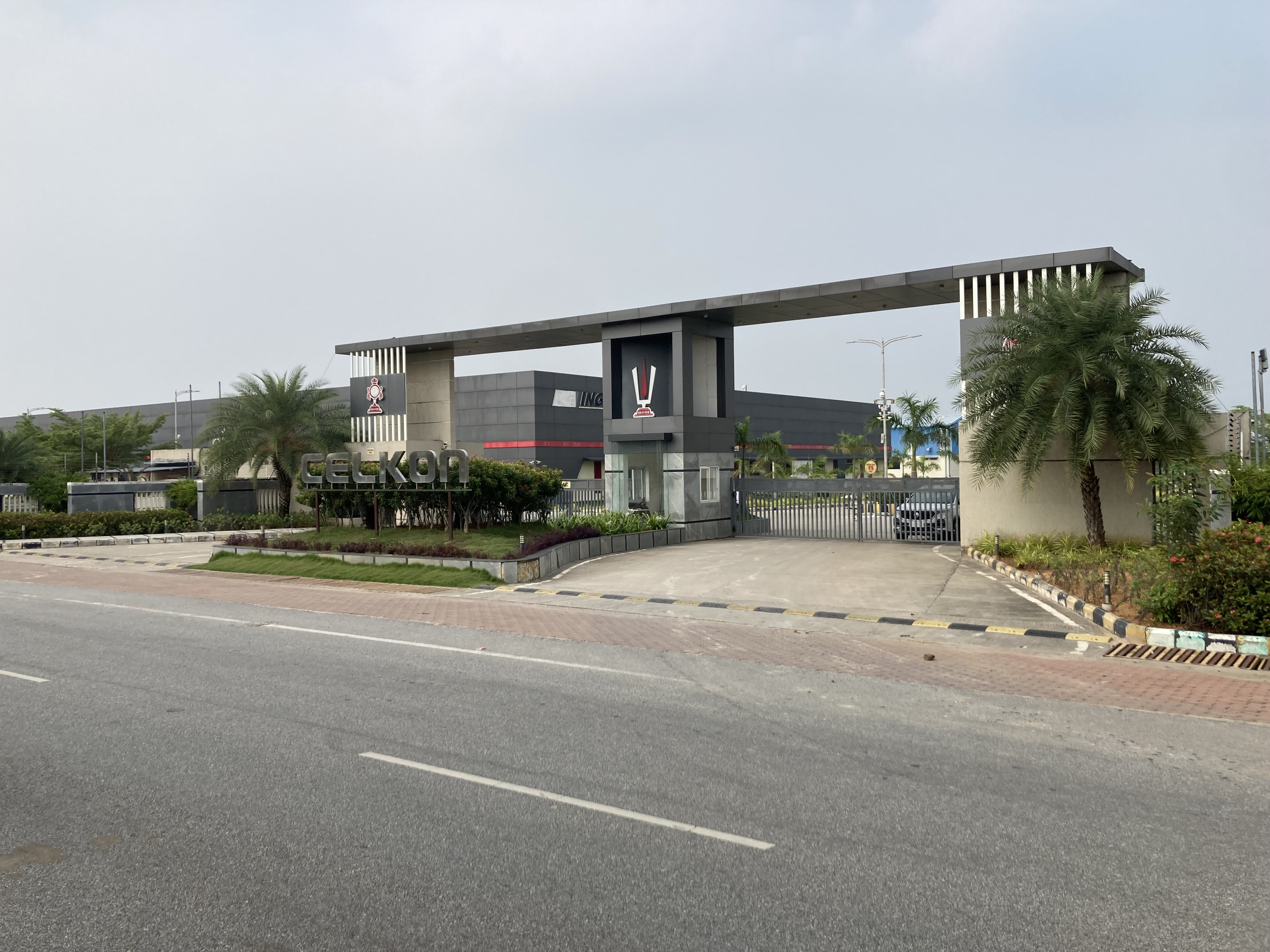
CELKON Manufacturing plant at Tirupati

It hosts companies like Celkon and Karbon which are manufacturing their phones from this hub.

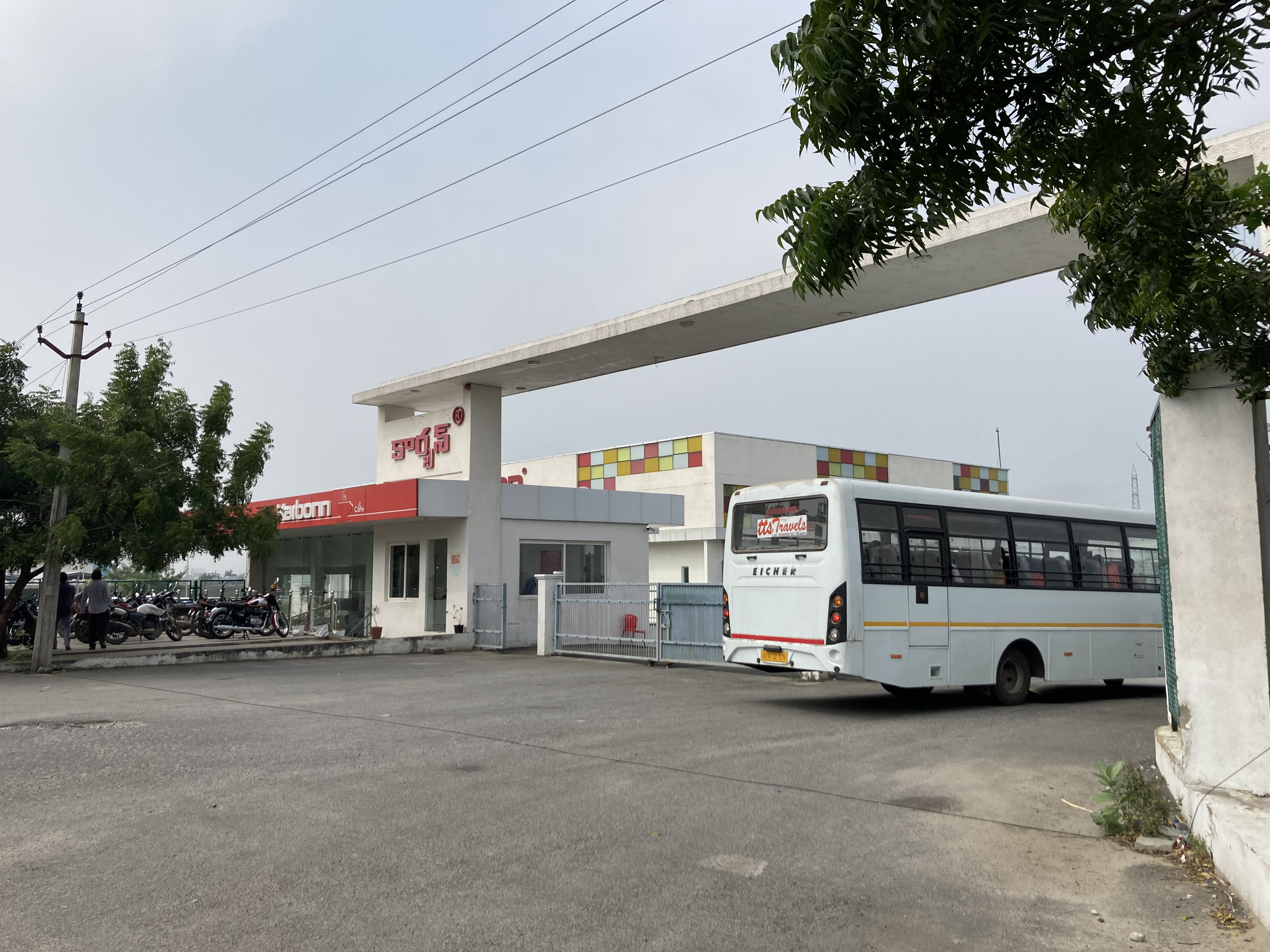
KARBON Manufacturing plant at Tirupati
