= Agri Export Zone =

An Agri Export Zone or AEZ is a specific geographic region in a country demarcated for setting up agriculture based processing industries, mainly for export. The term is widely used mainly in India.

AEZ are to be identified by the State Government, who would evolve a comprehensive package of services provided by all State Government agencies, State agriculture universities and all institutions and agencies of the Union Government for intensive delivery in these zones. Corporate sector with proven credentials would be encouraged to sponsor new agri export zone or take over already notified agri export zone or part of such zones for boosting agri exports from the zones. Implementation in India 2001
