= List of tourist attractions and events in Visakhapatnam =

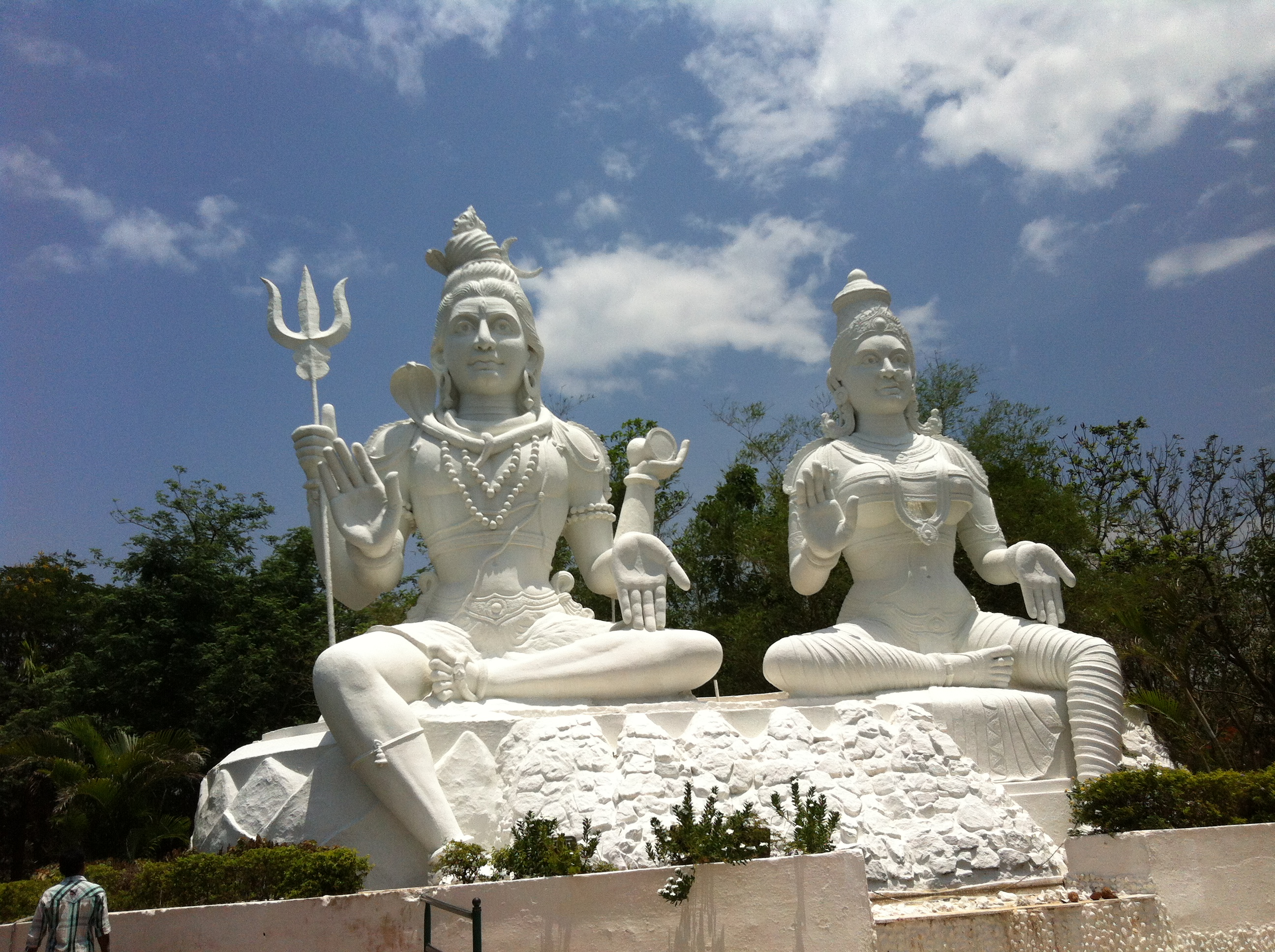
The Kailasagiri is the famous tourist place in Andhra Pradesh

Visakhapatnam is the largest City of the Indian state Andhra Pradesh and asll so called as City of Destiny in the state of Andhra Pradesh compare to other cities Visakhapatnam has more tourist places and total tourism income of the state Visakhapatnam tourisam contributes 40% of the income. Central Visakhapatnam has main tourist places like RK Beach, Beach Road, Kailasagiri and APSRTC runs special tourist buses for city tour.

== Attractions ==
=== Parks ===
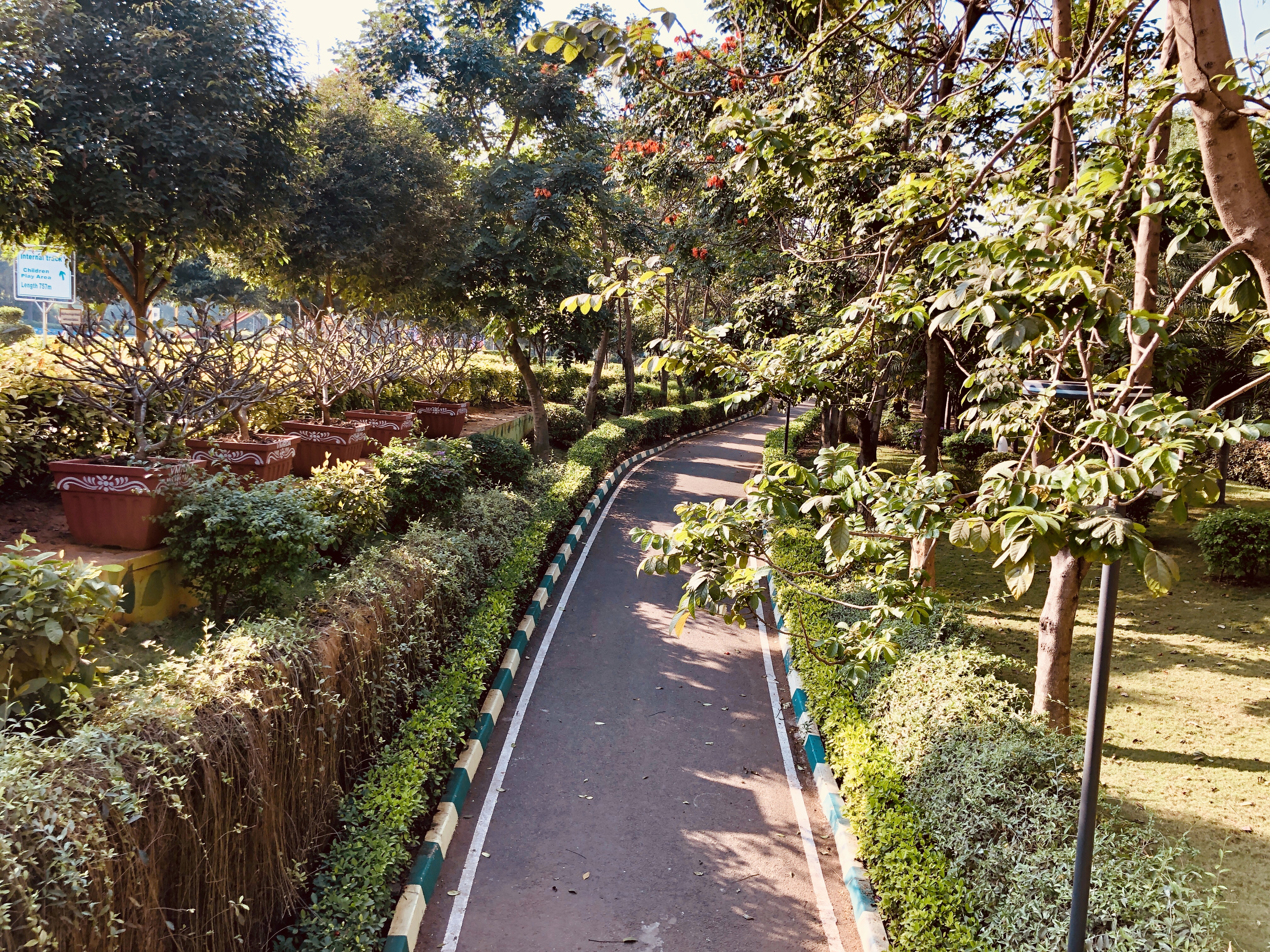
Cycle track in VMRDA city Central Park

- Kailasagiri is a famous hill top park and one of the highest tourist visited place in the city.It spreads out to 380 acres with facilities like rope way, mini train and well connected buses are also available.
- Dr.Y.S.Rajasekhara Reddy Central Park is Central park located in city center Dwaraka Nagar area. This park is good connected with all parts of city and have musical fountain, Cycle track, Yoga center and running track
- VUDA Park this park is besides sea and one of the famous park in the state, this park is famous for skating track and boating
- Mudasarlova Park is Visakhapatnam's oldest park and have all most 100 years of history and area of 20 acres (8.1 ha). this park is adjusted with Mudasarlova Reservoir located with peaceful area

=== Zoo park and Wildlife Sanctuary ===
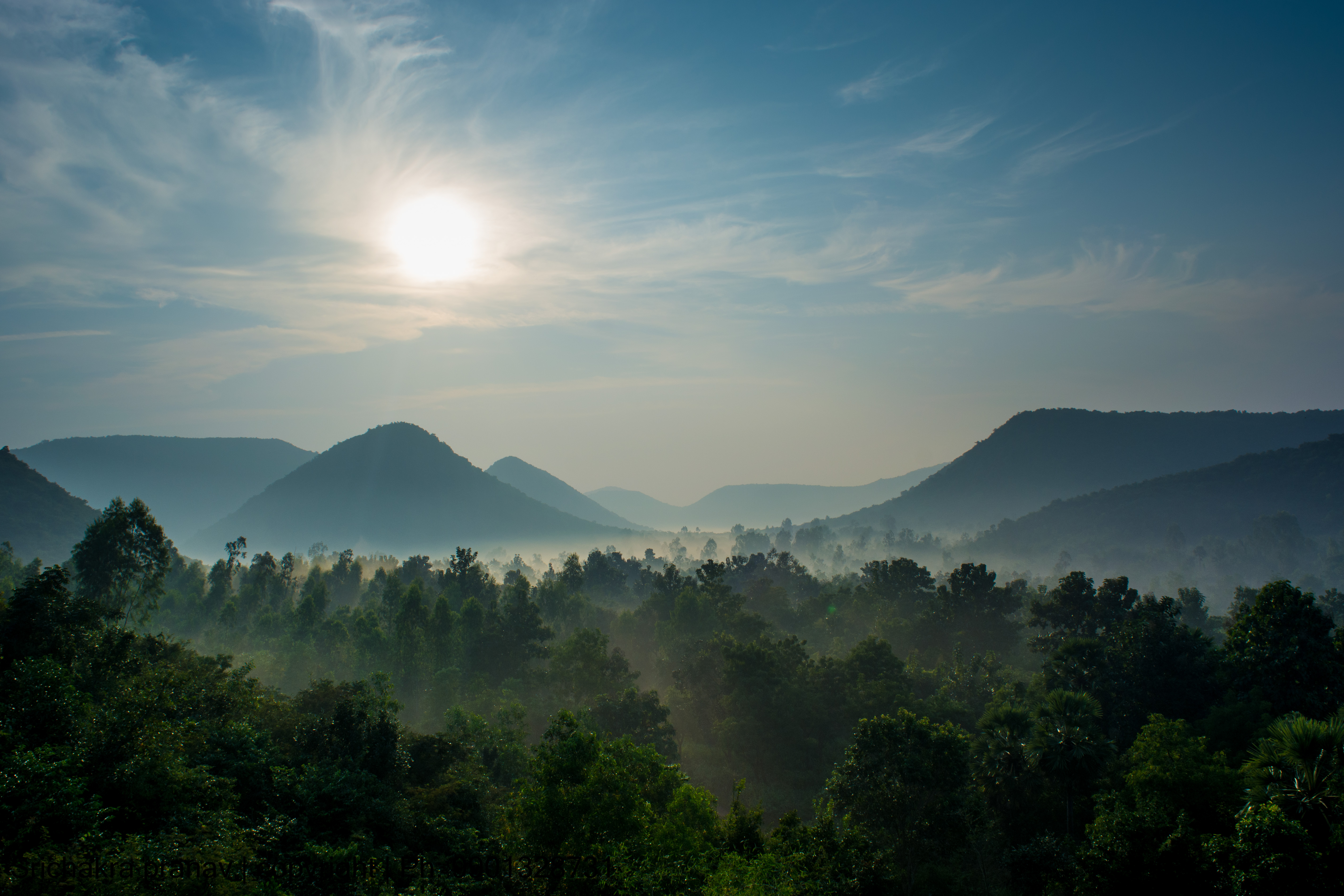
Kambalakonda Landscape

- Indira Gandhi Zoological Park is the largest zoo park in the state of Andhra Pradesh spread over 625 acres (253 ha) with 850 animals and 75 species
- Kambalakonda Wildlife Sanctuary is Wildlife Sanctuary located near city and its lifeline of city because this Wildlife Sanctuary plays key role in Visakhapatnam city environment and this place famous for trekking.
- Kondakarla Ava is lake and birds Sanctuary this lake is destination for migrant birds and seasonal destination for birds, and it a good picnic spot for public

=== Beaches ===
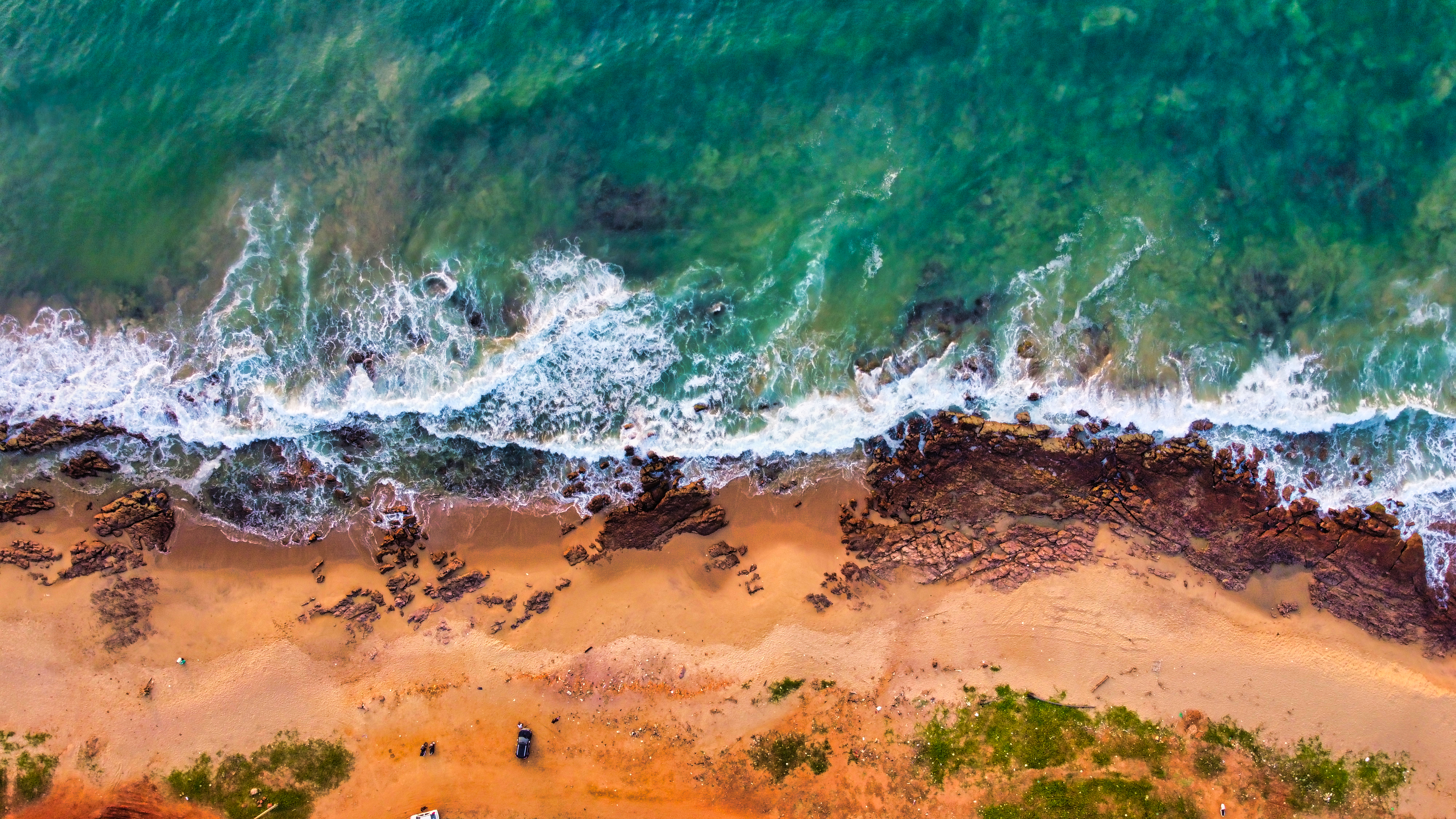
aerial view of Rushikonda Beach

- RK Beach Visakhapatnam is famous for beaches and RK Beach is popular and is situated in Central Visakhapatnam
- Rushikonda Beach is popular tourist destination and cleanest beach in the city, this beach revived Blue Flag beach and one of the rarest beach India achieved this feat
- Yarada Beach is one of the beautiful beach situated South visakhapatnam

=== Religious places ===
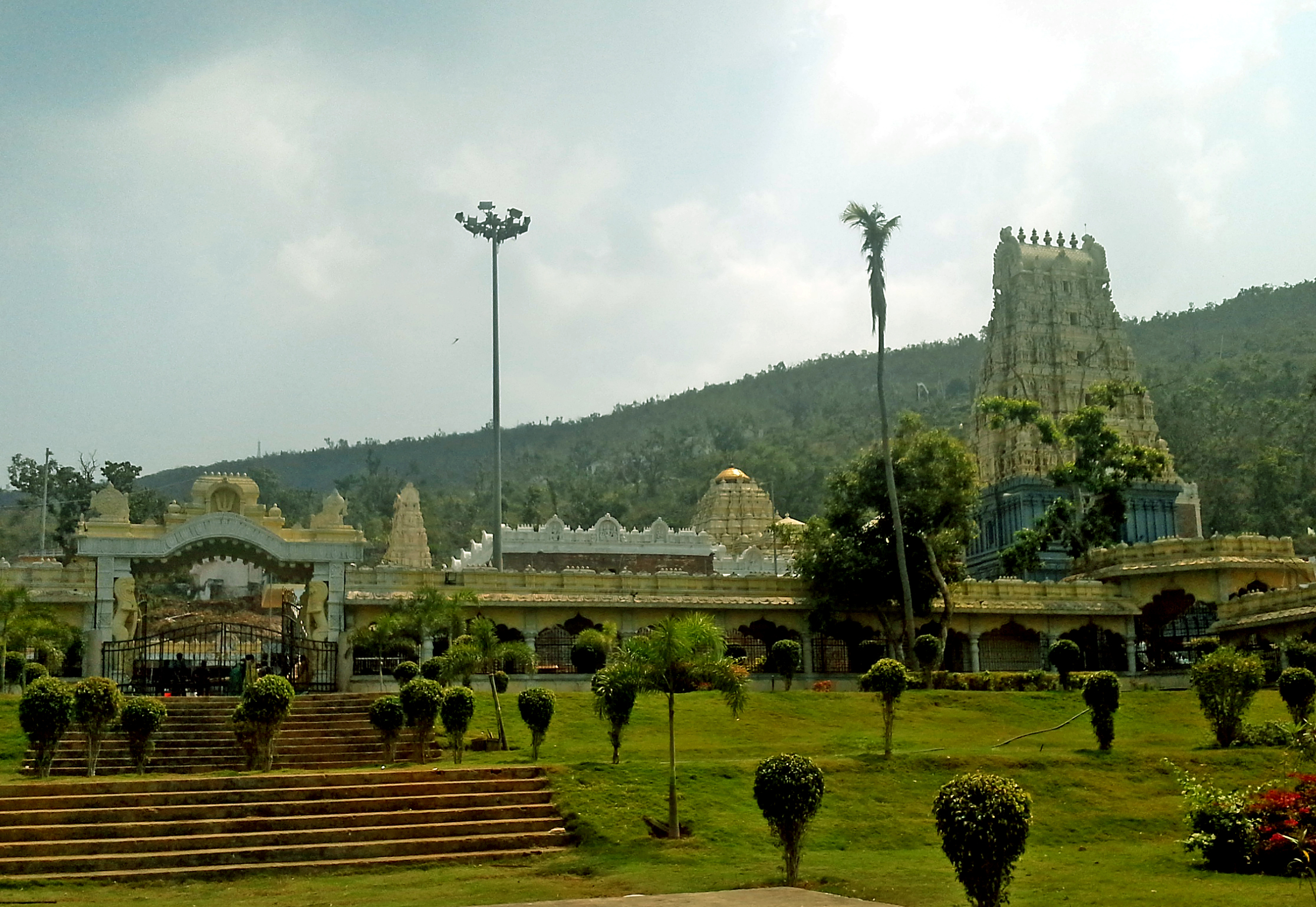
view of Simhachalam Temple

- Simhachalam temple is one of the ancient and richest temple in Andhra Pradesh and its major religious center for Hinduism in Visakhapatnam
- Kanaka Maha Lakshmi Temple is located in Burujupeta in Old town area the people of Visakhapatnam adore the god as locale god especially Women Devotes
- Sri Sampath Vinayagar Temple is situated Asilmetta area
- ISKCON Temple located Sagar Nagar in North Visakhapatnam
- Kali Temple is one of the landmark in RK Beach and Beach Road
- Someswara Swamy Temple is located in Appikonda its 11th century temple constructed by Chola Kings primary deity is lord Shiva

=== Museums ===
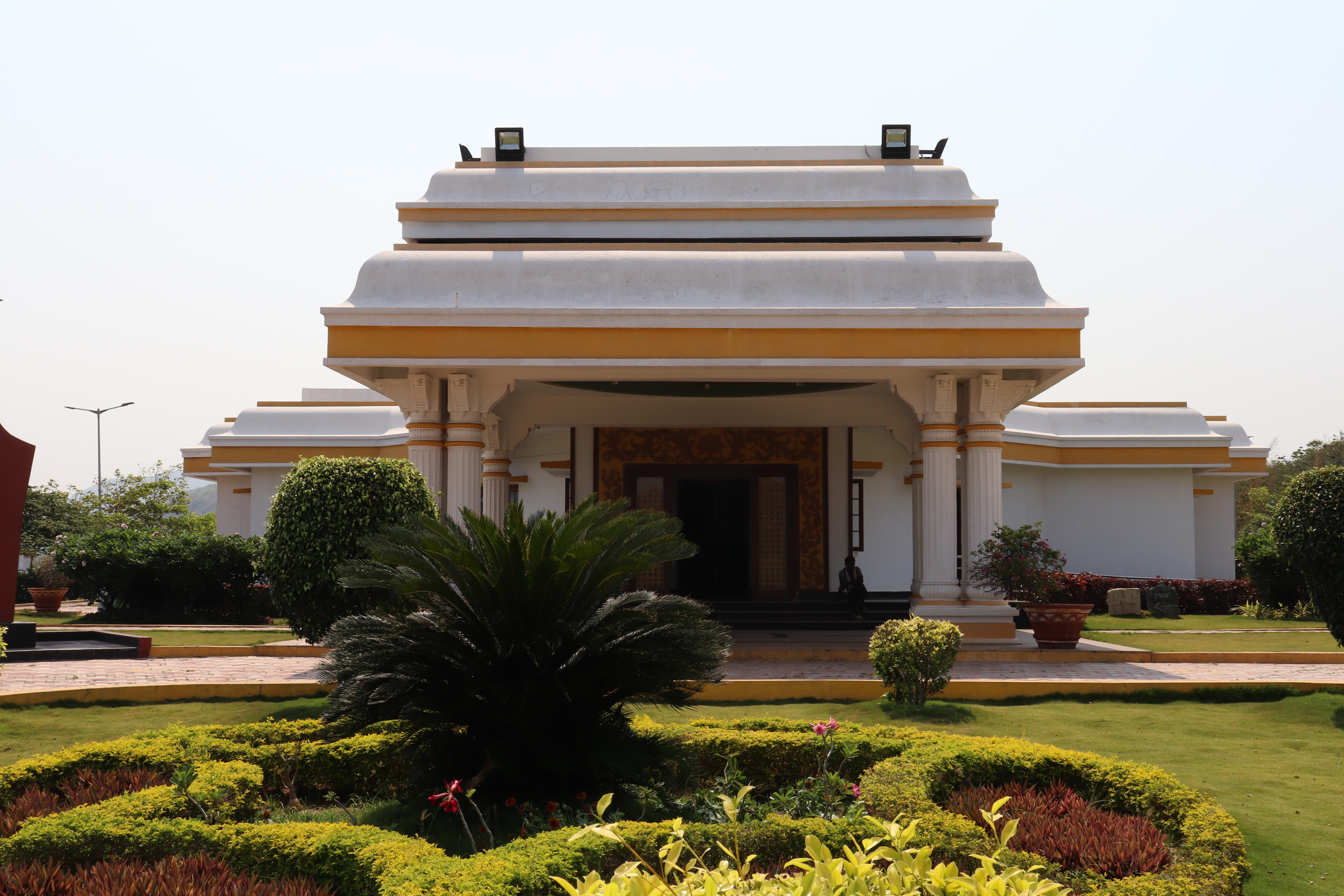
view of Telugu Samskruthika Niketanam

- Visakha Museum is located in Beach Road and its treasure of ancient culture
- Telugu Samskruthika Niketanam is a Telugu Museum and its on Kailasagiri the main aim of this museum is to explore culture of Telugu people, Telugu literature and Telugu language
- TU 142 Aircraft Museum is aircraft museum at RK Beach
- INS Kursura Museum is one of the first submarine museum in Asia located at Beach road

=== War memorials ===
- Victory at Sea Memorial is a war memorial this memorial constructed for Indo-Pakistani War of 1971
- Vijaya stambha this pillar setup by Krishnadevaraya ruler of Vijayanagara Empire he won against Gajapati Empire in battle of Potnuru

=== Shopping ===
- CMR Central
- CENTRAL, Visakhapatnam
- Jagadamba Centre
- Town Kotha Road

== events ==
- Visakha Utsav a carnival celebrates every year in December and January month conducted by Andhra Pradesh Tourism Development Corporation and Visakhapatnam Metropolitan Region Development Authority
- Navy Day is celebrated annually victory over Pakistan
- Balloon Festival

== See also ==
- Tourism in Andhra Pradesh
