= Tourism in Andhra Pradesh =

Andhra Pradesh is a state in India. Andhra Pradesh Tourism Development Corporation (APTDC) is a state government agency which promotes tourism in Andhra Pradesh, describing the state as the Koh-i-Noor of India. Andhra Pradesh has a variety of tourist attractions including beaches, hills, caves, wildlife, forests and temples.

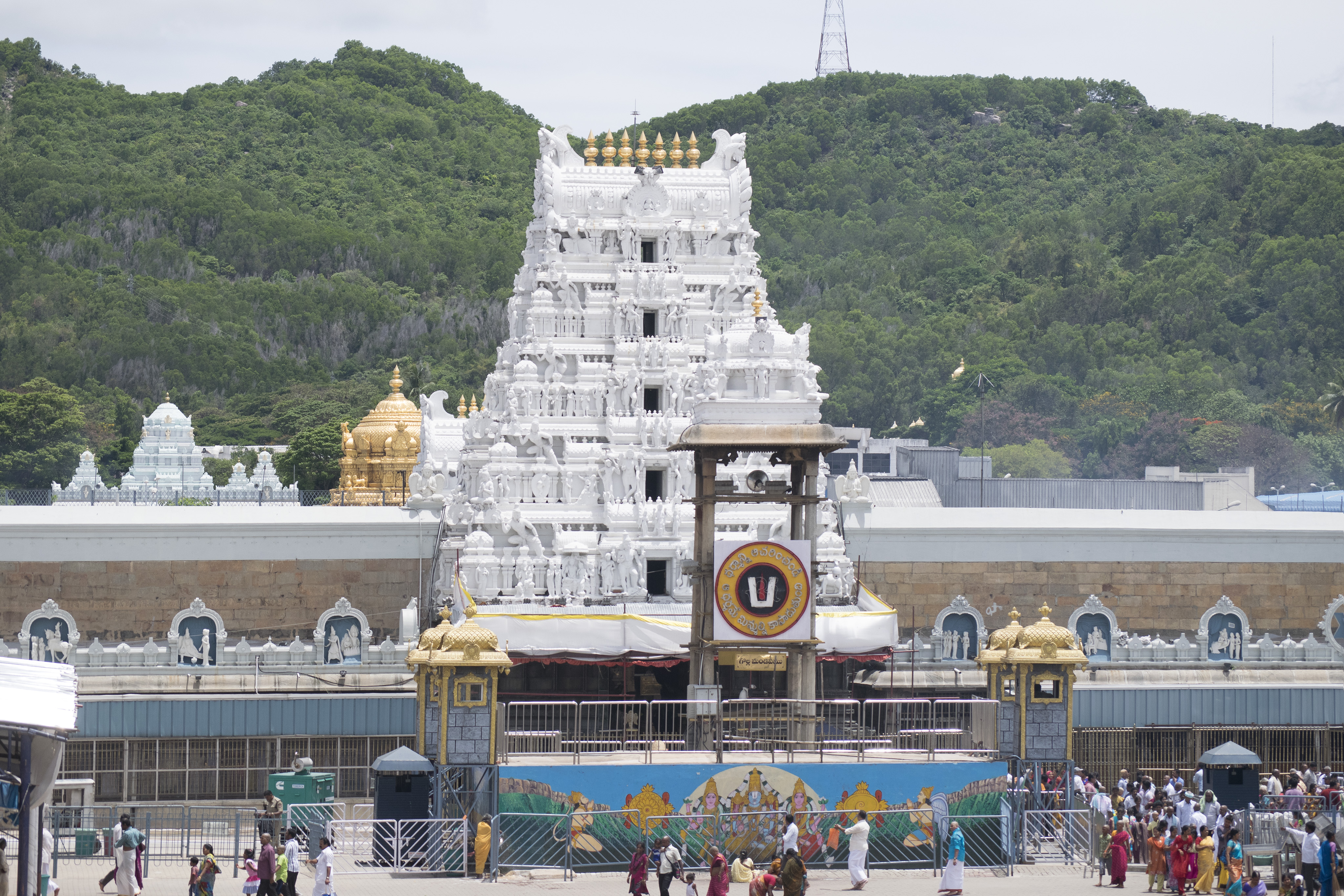
Venkateswara Temple, Tirumala

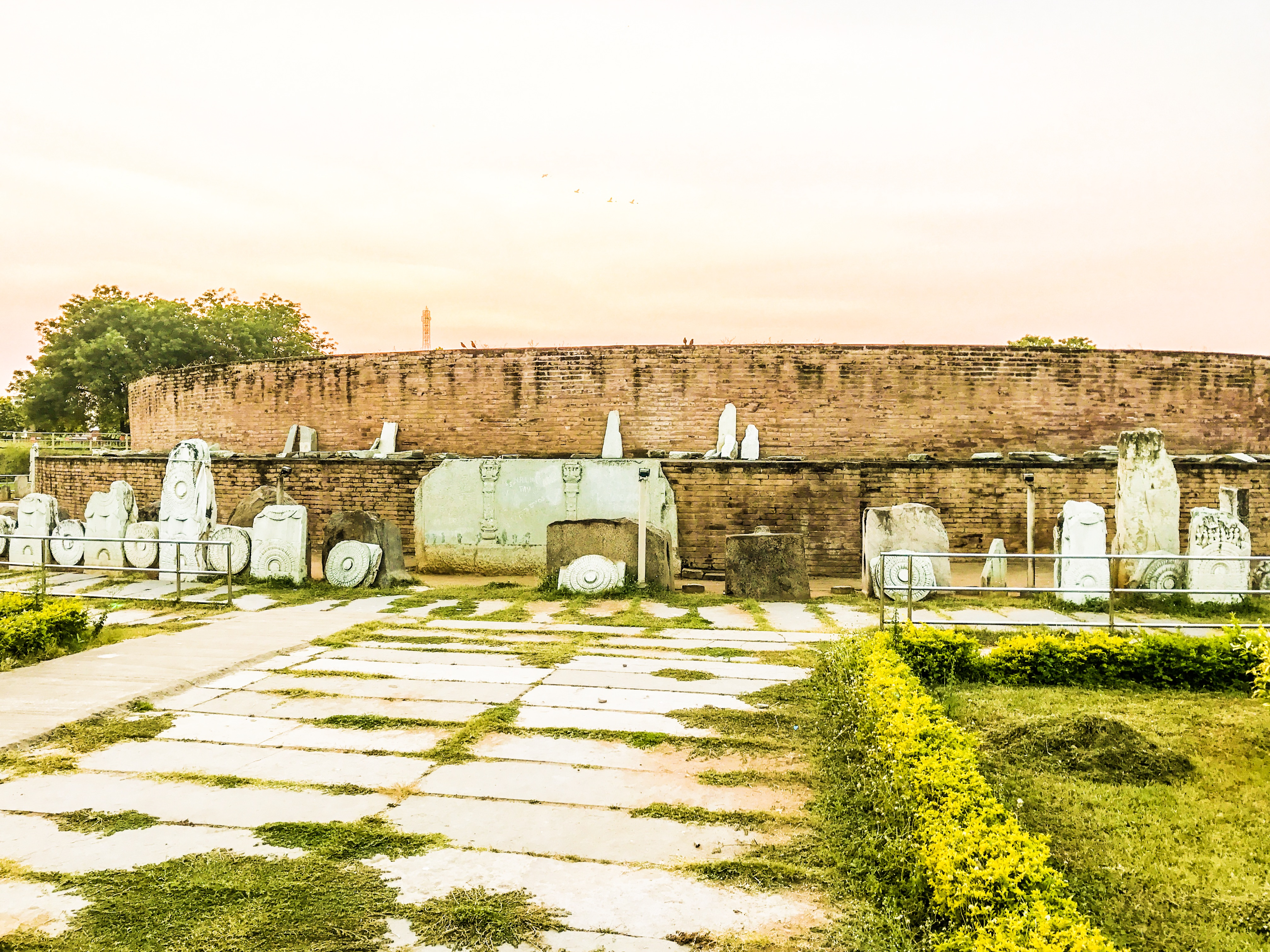
Ruins of Amaravati Stupa

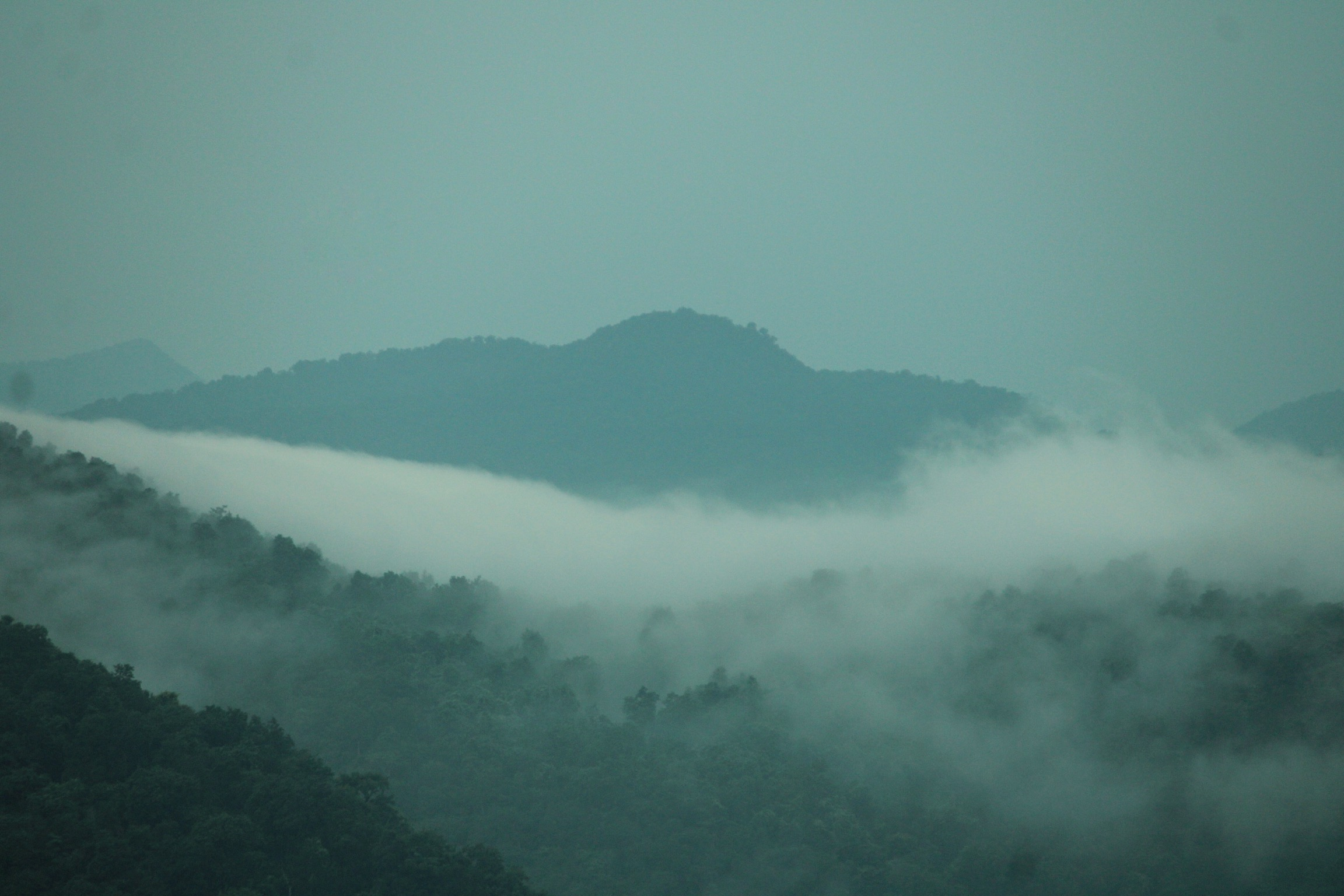
Foggy Morning in Lambasingi

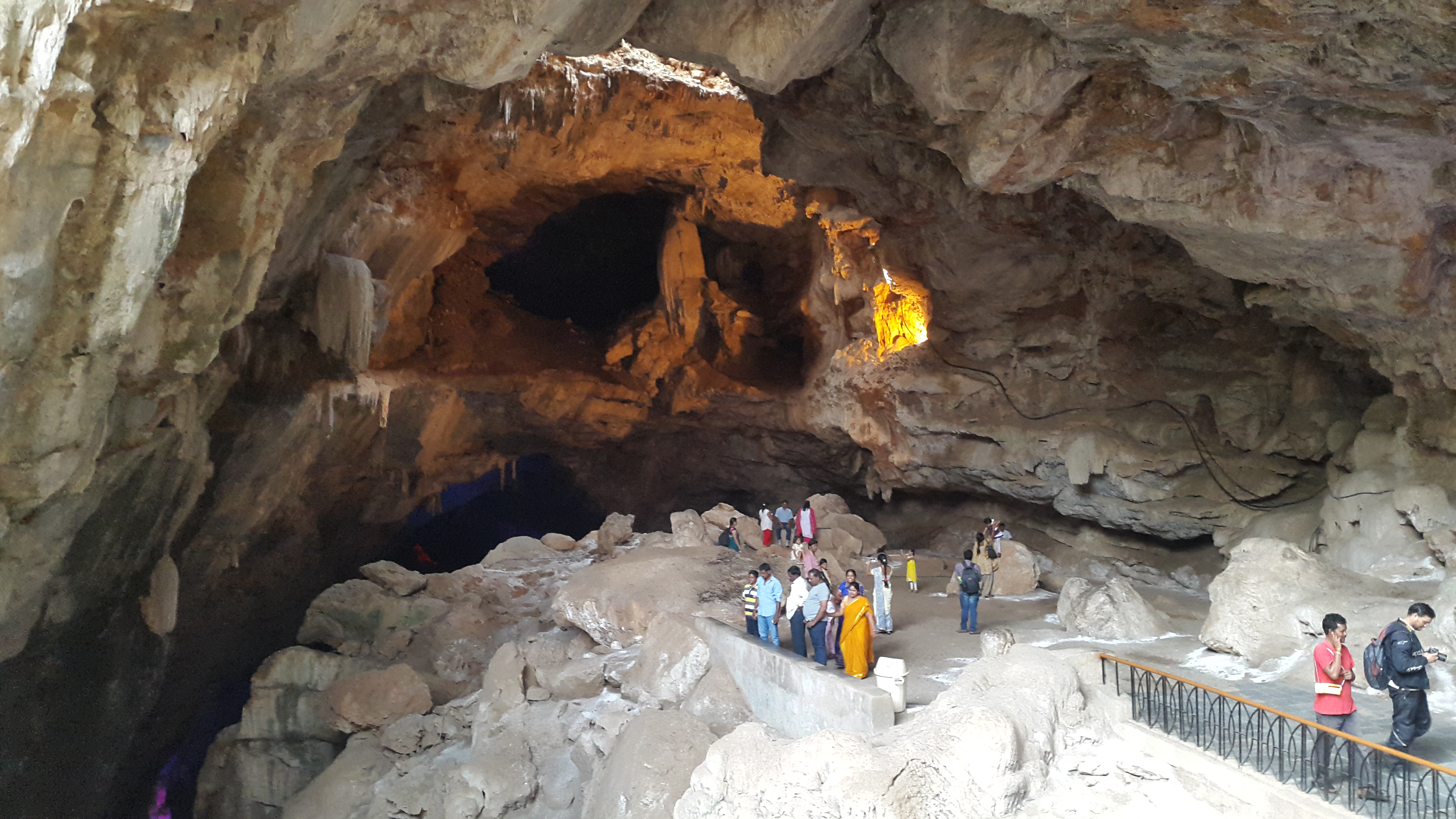
Borra Caves, Visakhapatnam

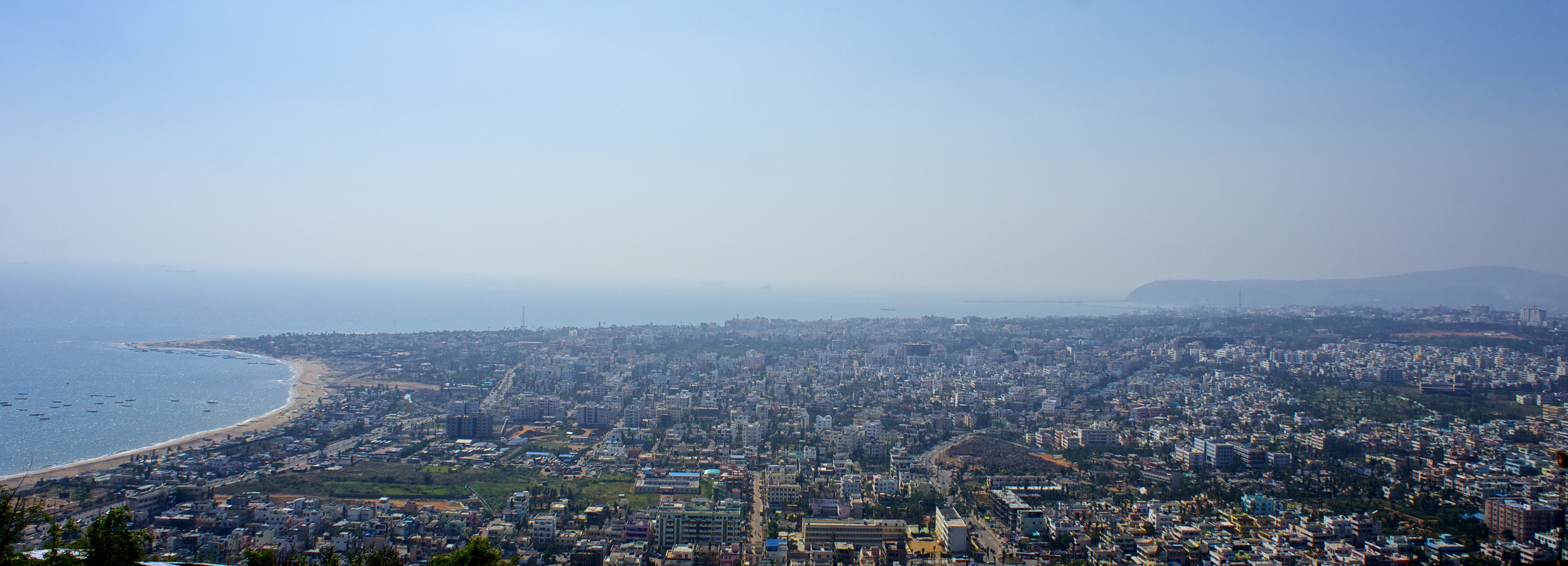
Visakhapatnam, Andra Pradesh

== Tourist destinations ==
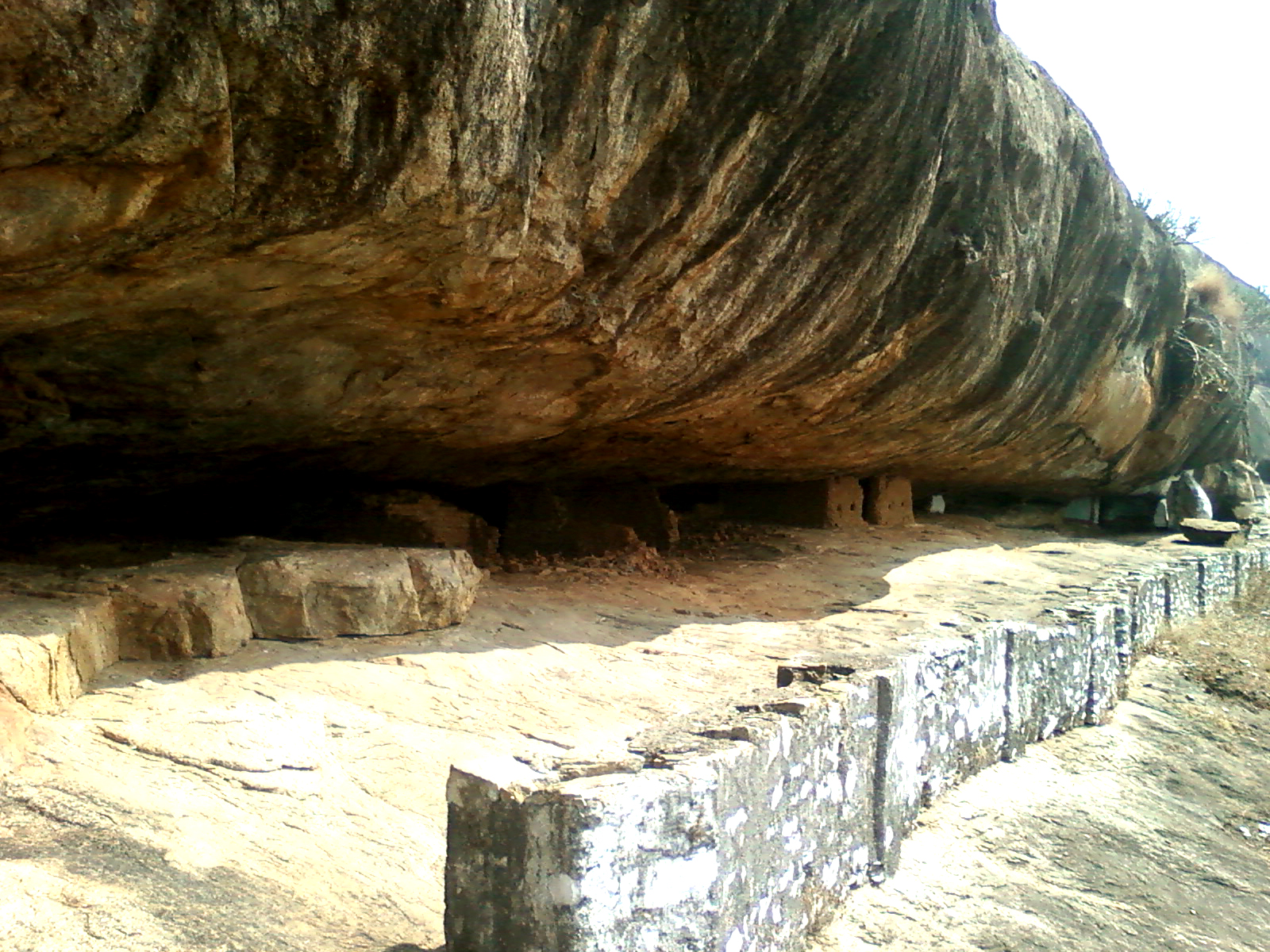
Rock-cut cave ruins at Ramatheerrtham in Vizianagaram district

=== Visakhapatnam ===
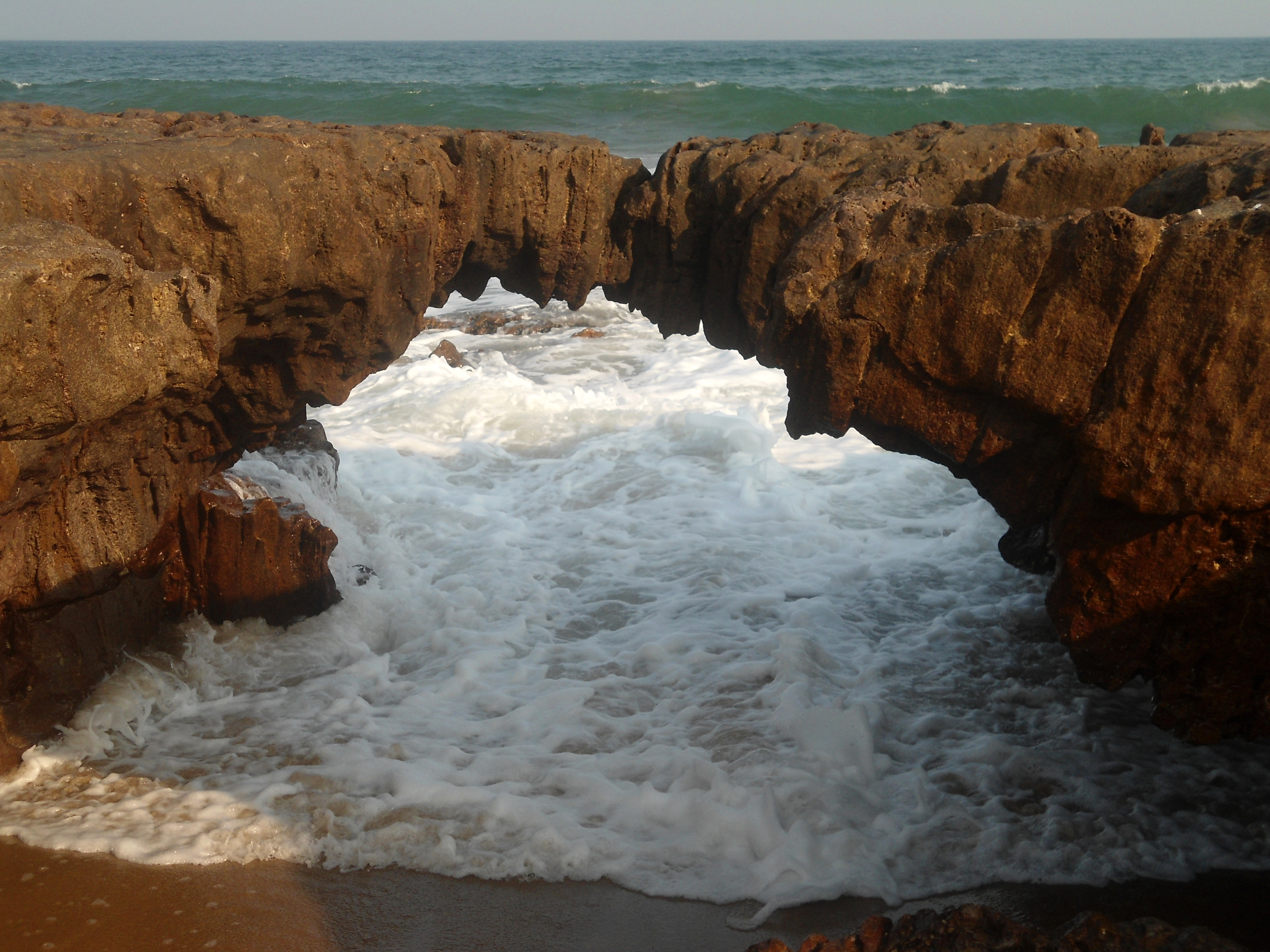
Natural arch (water eroded) at Thotlakonda beach in Visakhapatnam

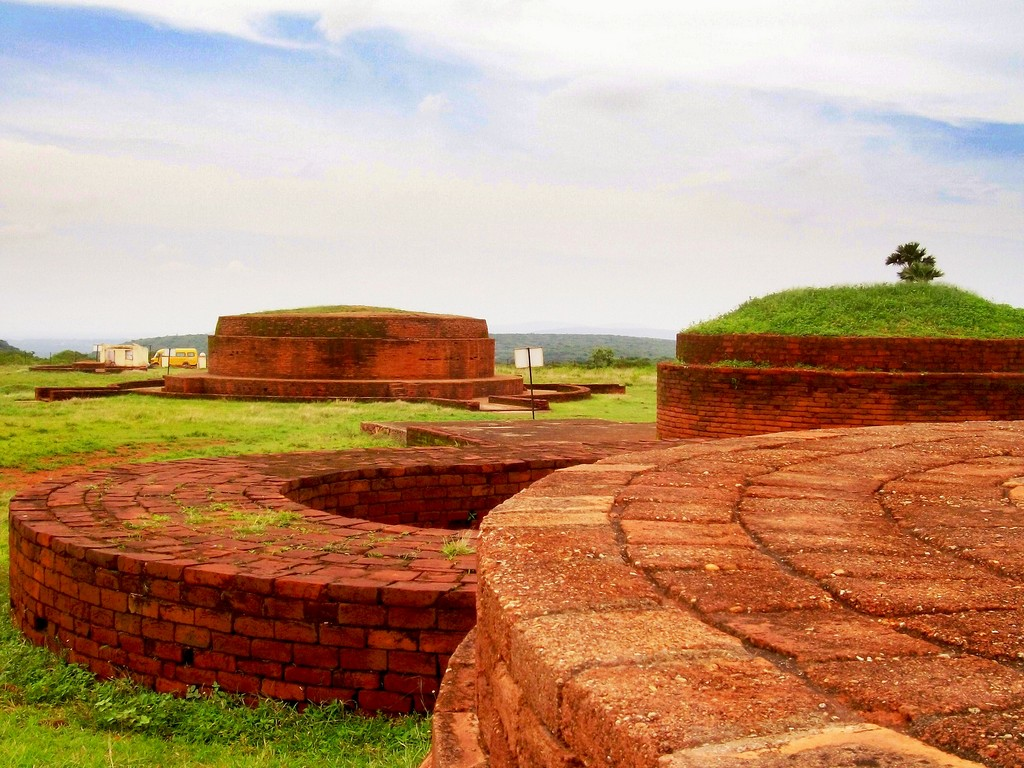
Bavikonda Buddhist Monastic ruins, Visakhapatnam

Visakhapatnam city has many tourist attractions such as Kailasagiri park near the sea, Visakha Museum, Indira Gandhi Zoological Park, the INS Kursura (S20) Submarine museum, City Central Park, VUDA Park, the Dolphin's Nose, and the Lighthouse. The TU 142 Aircraft Museum in Visakhapatnam is a newly opened museum in the coastline of RK Beach.

=== Baruva (Beach) ===
Baruva is a village located near Sompeta in Srikakulam district, Andhra Pradesh, India. It is located at 18.53N 84.35E., at an average height 10m(35 feet) The Mahendratanaya river merges into the Bay of Bengal at this place. Baruva was used as a seaport in the era of British colonial rule in India up to 1948. In July 1917 a ship carrying goods sank in the sea. To commemorate this incident a pillar was constructed.[2] The harbor is closed, but the old lighthouse stood until 2000. A light house has been constructed next to the beach resort. Baruva's beach is one of the oldest in Andhra Pradesh.

Attractions at Baruva.

- Beach
- Confluence of River Mahendratanaya into Bay of Bengal
- Light House and the new light house
- Kotilingeswara Swami Temple, Janardhana Swami Temple and Durga Temple.

=== Kalingapatnam (Beach) ===
Kalingapatnam is located in Gara mandal of Srikakulam District. It has one of the major beach sand deposits of the state. Kalingapatnam was one of the ancient Andhra's harbour towns. Perfumes, textiles and so on were exported to other countries from the port. Kalingapatnam port was closed during British rule of India, but the light house constructed by the British at Kalingapatnam port. Kalingapatnam Beach is the place where river Vamsadhara empties into Bay of Bengal.

Attractions at Kalingapatnam

- Beach
- Light House
- River vamsadhara confluence into Bay of Bengal

=== Mandasa (Place of worship) ===
Mandasa is a village in Srikakulam district of Andhra Pradesh. The village is known for its Vasudeva temple. The history of this place dates back to the 14th century. This temple dedicated to Krishna is highly renowned. The place is of high religious and mythological importance. It is believed that the Pandavas, during their exile took shelter at the Mahendra Giri Hills. The Mandasa temple flourished during the 17th century. It served as a great inspiration centre for devotes, many young aspirants thronged the temple to acquire Vedic knowledge. The temple has been reconstructed a few years back in an exact way restoring its novel Kalinga architecture. The Mandasa Mandal is enclosed by the mighty Bay of Bengal in the east, Mahindra Hills in the west and Two rivers, Sunnamuddi and Mahendra Tanaya originating from the Mahendra Giri hills flow through this region into the Bay of Bengal.

Attractions at Mandasa

- Mahendragiri Hill:

Mahendragiri, is a mountain peak in the Paralakhemundi subdivision of the district of Gajapati, Odisha, India. It is situated amongst the Eastern Ghats at an elevation of 1,501 metres. Mahendra Giri is also known as the abode of the revered Sage Parashurama. In Mahabharata it has been mentioned that Parashurama, the 6th incarnation of Vishnu stayed near the Mahendra Hills for twelve long years.

- Vasudeva Temple:

The Mandasa temple flourished during the 17th century. It served as a great inspiration centre for devotees, many young aspirants thronged the temple for acquiring Vedic knowledge. The temple has been reconstructed a few years back in an exactly way restoring its novel Kalinga architecture.

- Fort:

Mandasa Fort is an abode of the erstwhile landlords of Mandasa and it is known for its several fortifications and the adornment of paintings and carvings seen at the fort.

==== Clock Tower at Bheemunipatnam (28 km) ====
The big clock tower in the town was built by British.

==== Dutch Cemetery at Bheemunipatnam (28 Km) ====
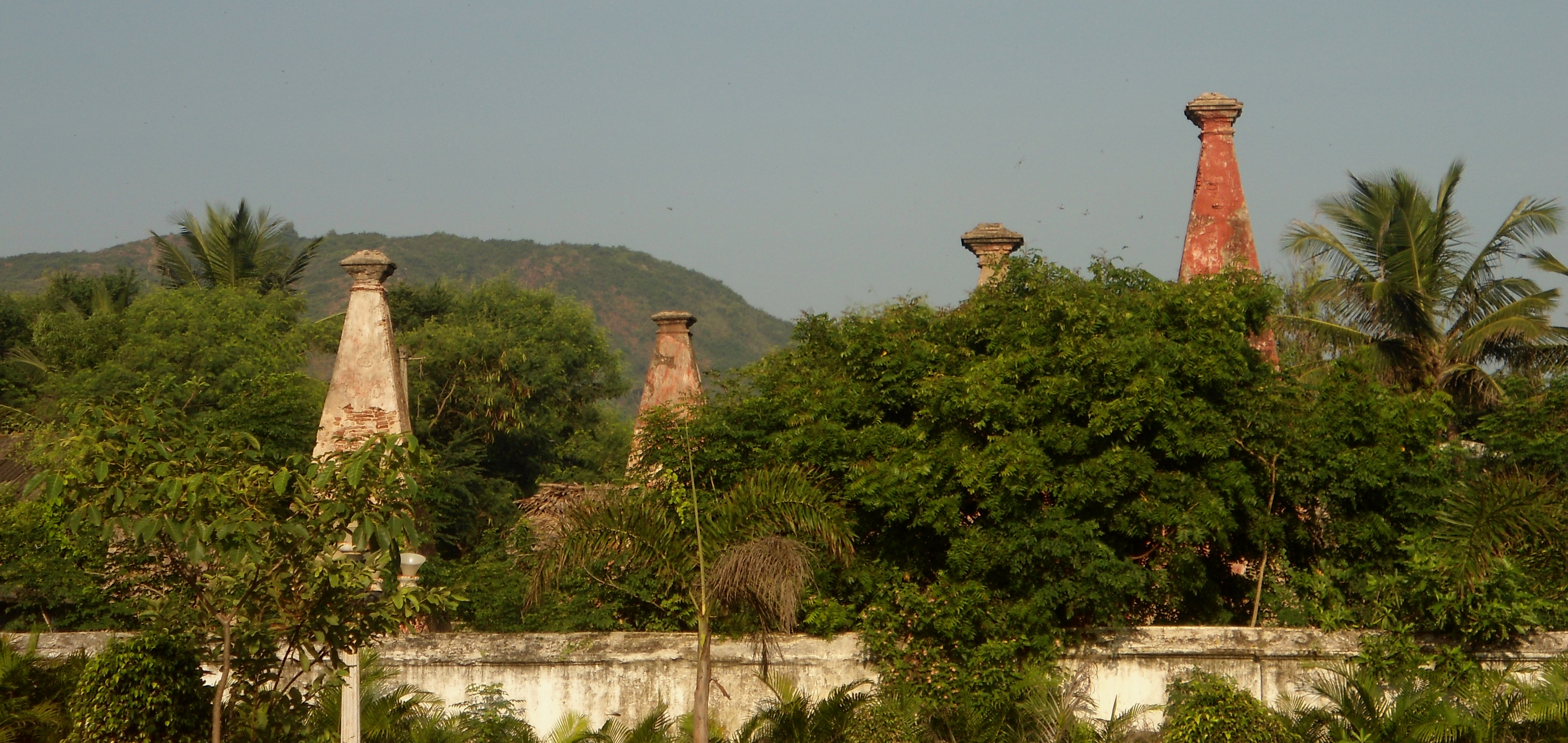
A far View of the Flagstaff Dutch cemetery at Bheemunipatnam beach

The cemetery situated in the west of the town at the sea beach speaks of the Dutch who gave their lives here. The unique feature of the cemetery is the depiction of the cause of the death on the grave enlivens the past. Written in Portuguese this cemetery is located close to the sea beach. There are 52 tombs spread across two locations. Out of which 15 are stone capped and 5 of them have Dutch have inscriptions in Dutch language. These inscriptions are even visible today. One of pyramid shaped grave of Federick Kesslerus who died on 8 October 1661 is considered to be the earliest. This cemetery is divided in two parts, while entering to the right is for British people and rest of the area is for Dutch.

==== Light House at Bheemunipatnam (28 Km) ====
The small light house was built by the Dutch in 1868 and must have served the Dutch and British sailors well in its time. It has been partly renovated by the local administration and made functional.

==== St Peters Church (Red Church) at Bheemunipatnam (30 Km) ====
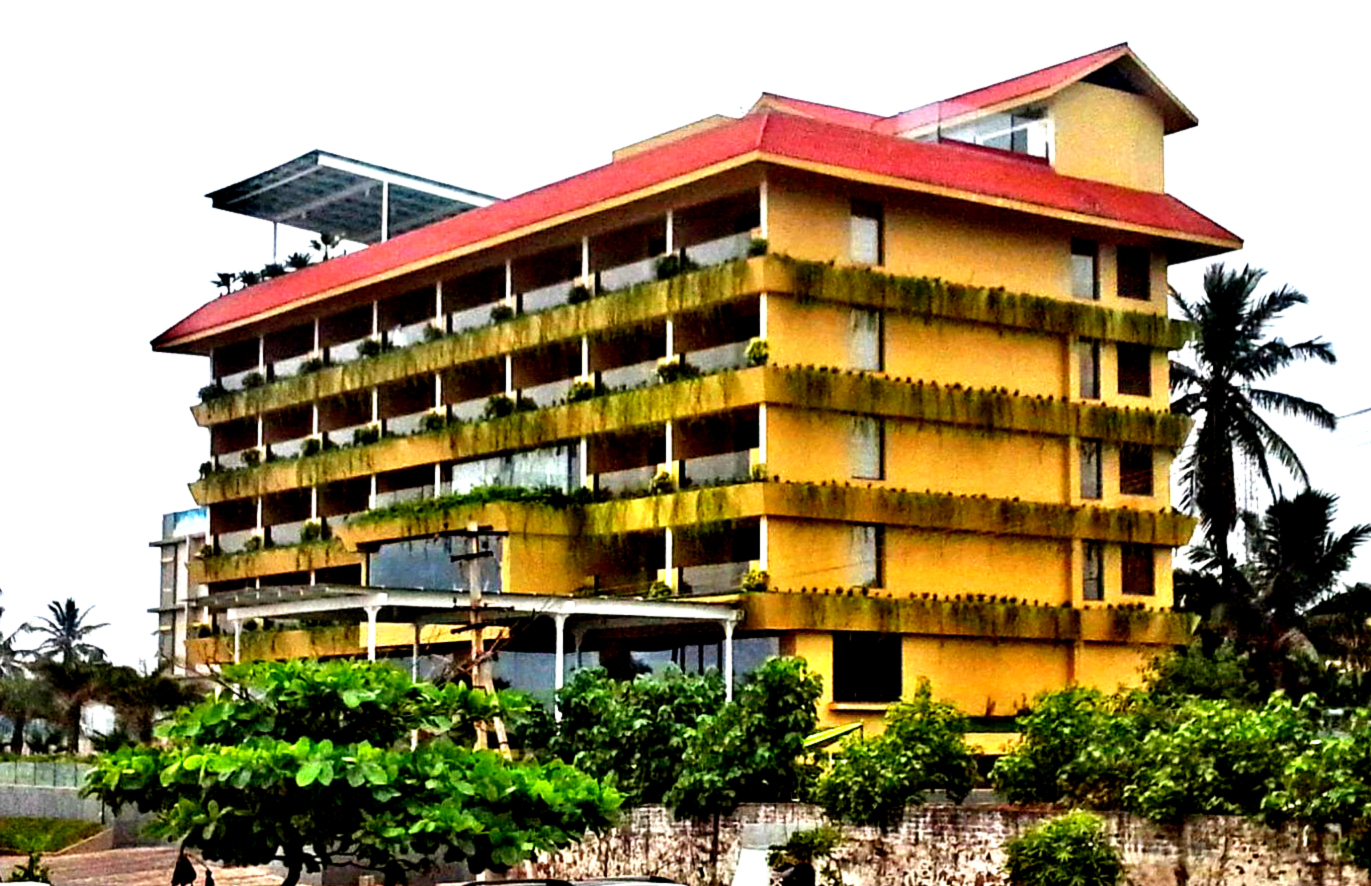
Novotel beach resort at Bheemunipatnam

It was consecrated on 17 March 1864, (by Rev. Bishop Gell, who named it in honour of St. Peter) and it has completed 150 years today and is still functional. The architectural splendor, location and the history connected with the St Peter's Church make it stand apart. The design and plans were made with help of a draughtsman of the 38 Madras Infantry. The east window of the church has an exquisitely designed stained glass depicting Christ's baptism, breaking of bread and Crucifixion. This unique piece was specially ordered and imported from London.

=== Vijayawada ===
Tourist spots at Vijayawada include Prakasam Barrage, Kondapalli Fort, Krishna River, Bhavani Island and many more parks in the city.

=== Other tourist spots in Andhra Pradesh ===
1. Rajahmundry city, located on the banks of Godavari River is one of the main attractions of the state.
2. Talakona waterfalls, located on the banks of Tirupati district is one of the main attractions of the state.

== Nature tourism ==
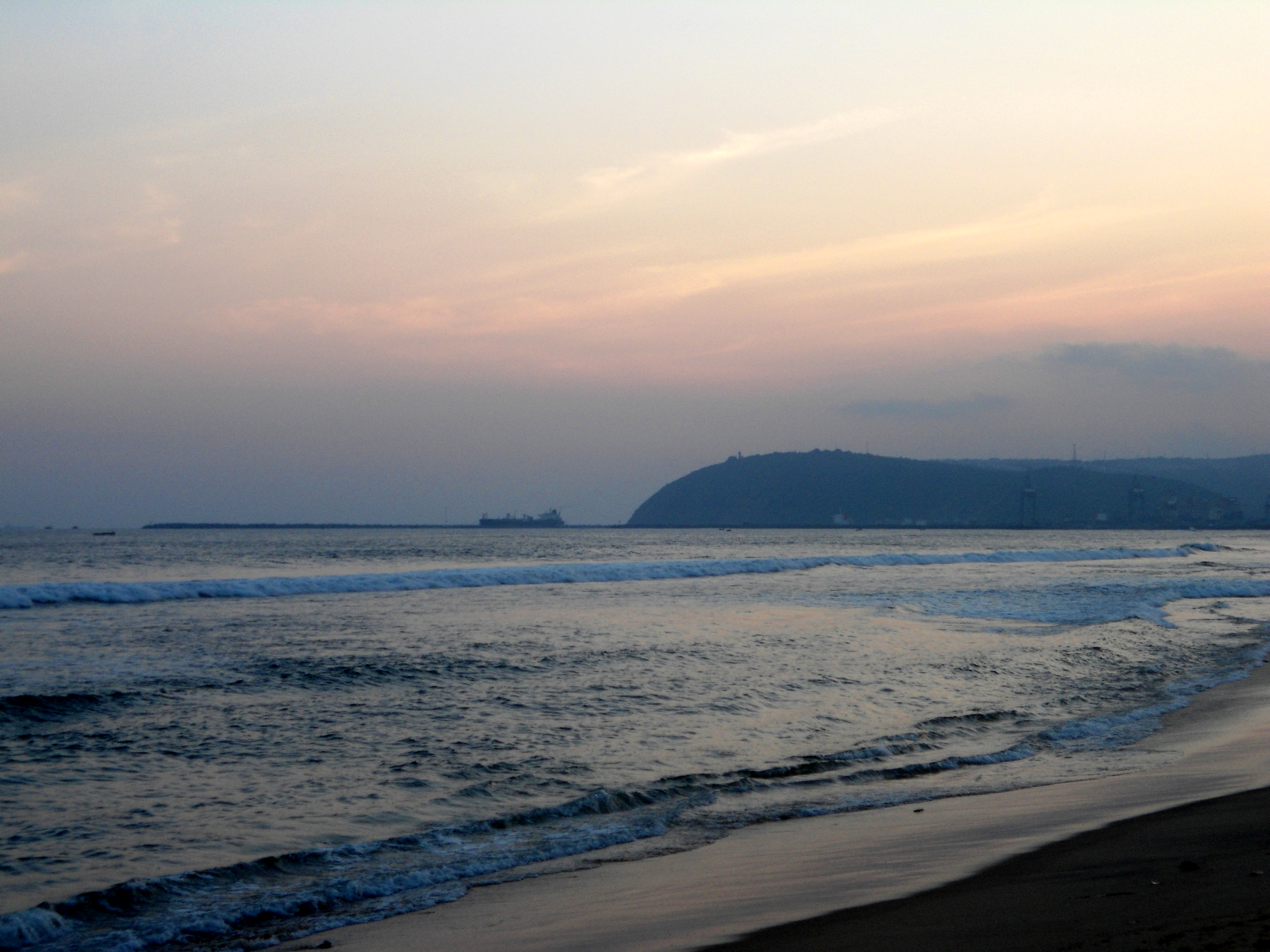
RK Beach

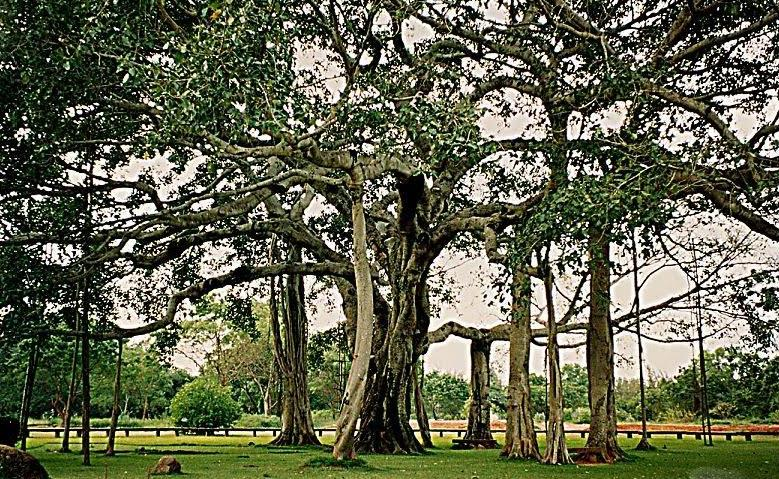
Thimmamma Marrimanu is the largest, known tree in the world by area of canopy coverage.

=== Beaches ===
Visakhapatnam has many beaches along the Bay of Bengal namely R.K. Beach, Yarada Beach, Rushikonda Beach and Lawsons Bay Beach. There are other beaches too along the long coastline of the state, such as Mypadu beach in Nellore, Suryalanka Beach, located 9 km from Bapatla in Bapatla district.

=== Caves ===
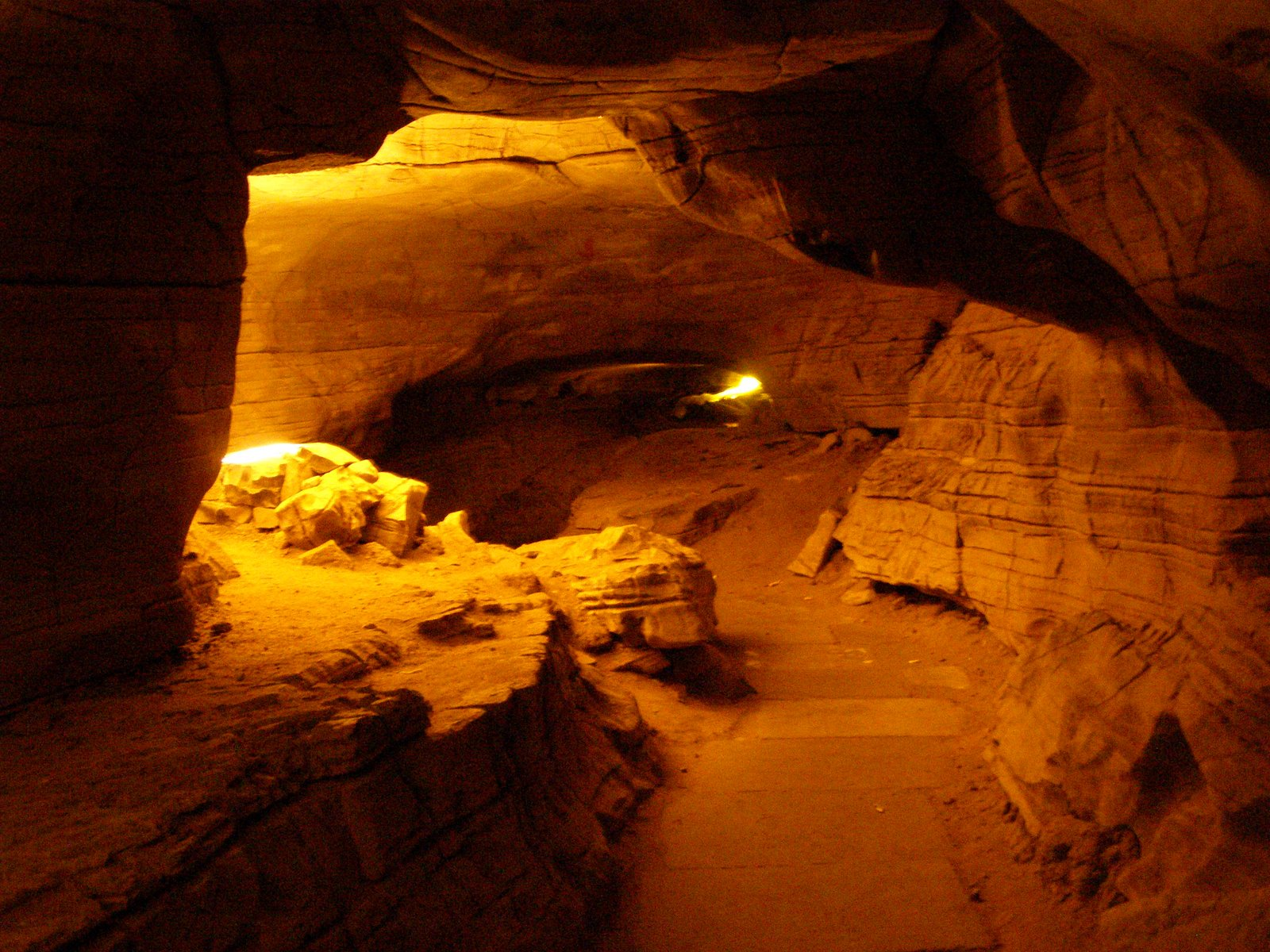
Belum Caves

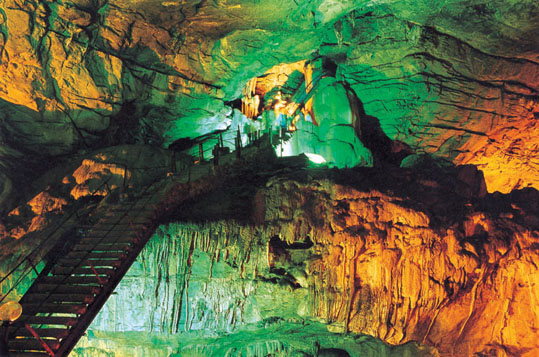
Borra Caves in Visakhapatnam district

The Borra Caves in the Ananthagiri Hills of the Eastern Ghats, near Visakhapatnam at an altitude of about 800 to 1300 metres are famous for million-year-old stalactite and stalagmite formations. They were discovered by British geologist William King George in 1807. The caves got their name for its resembles to a hole, which in Odia language is known as burra, where as Guhalu in Telugu language means caves.

The Belum Caves in Nandyal District have a length of 3,229 metres (10,594 ft), making them the second largest natural caves on the Indian subcontinent. The Belum Caves derive their name from Bilum, the Sanskrit word for caves. The caves have long passages, spacious chambers, freshwater galleries, and siphons. The caves' deepest point is 120 feet (37 m) from the entrance and is known as Patalaganga.

=== Hills and valleys ===
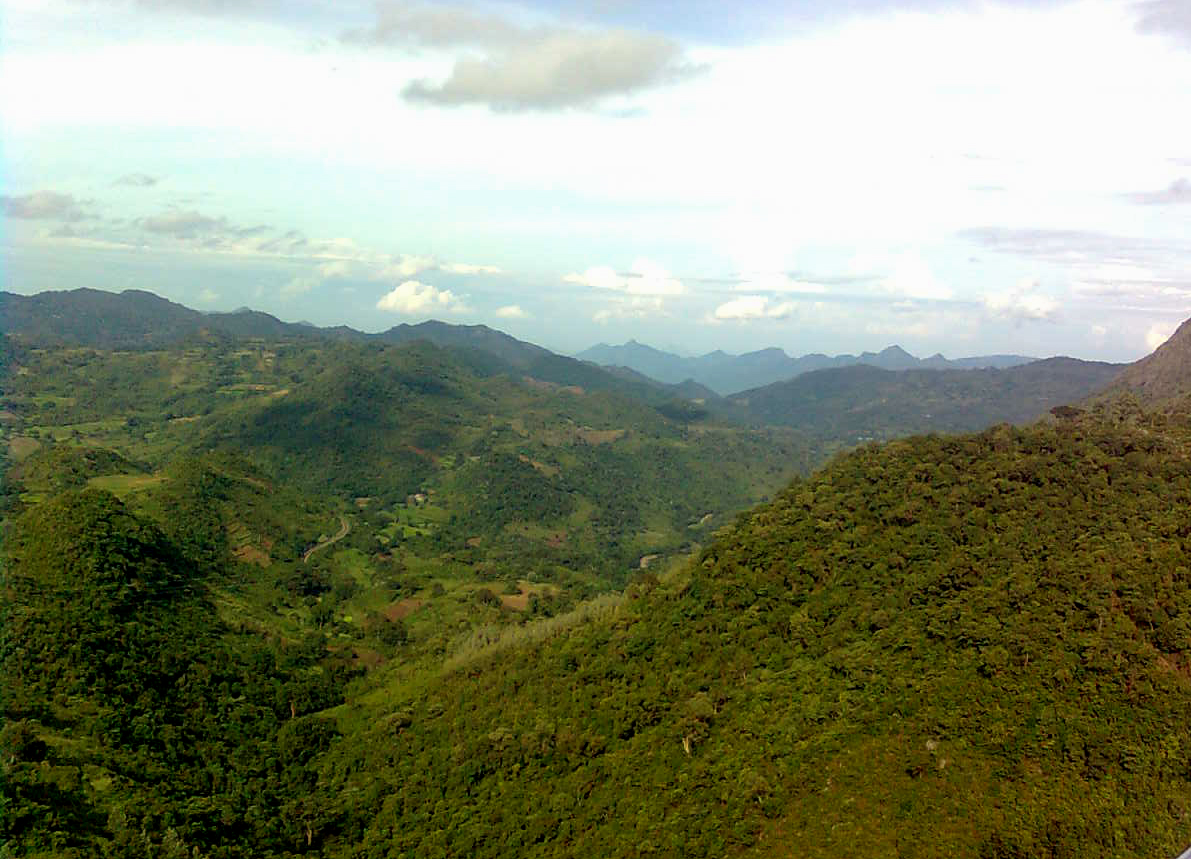
Araku valley scenic view

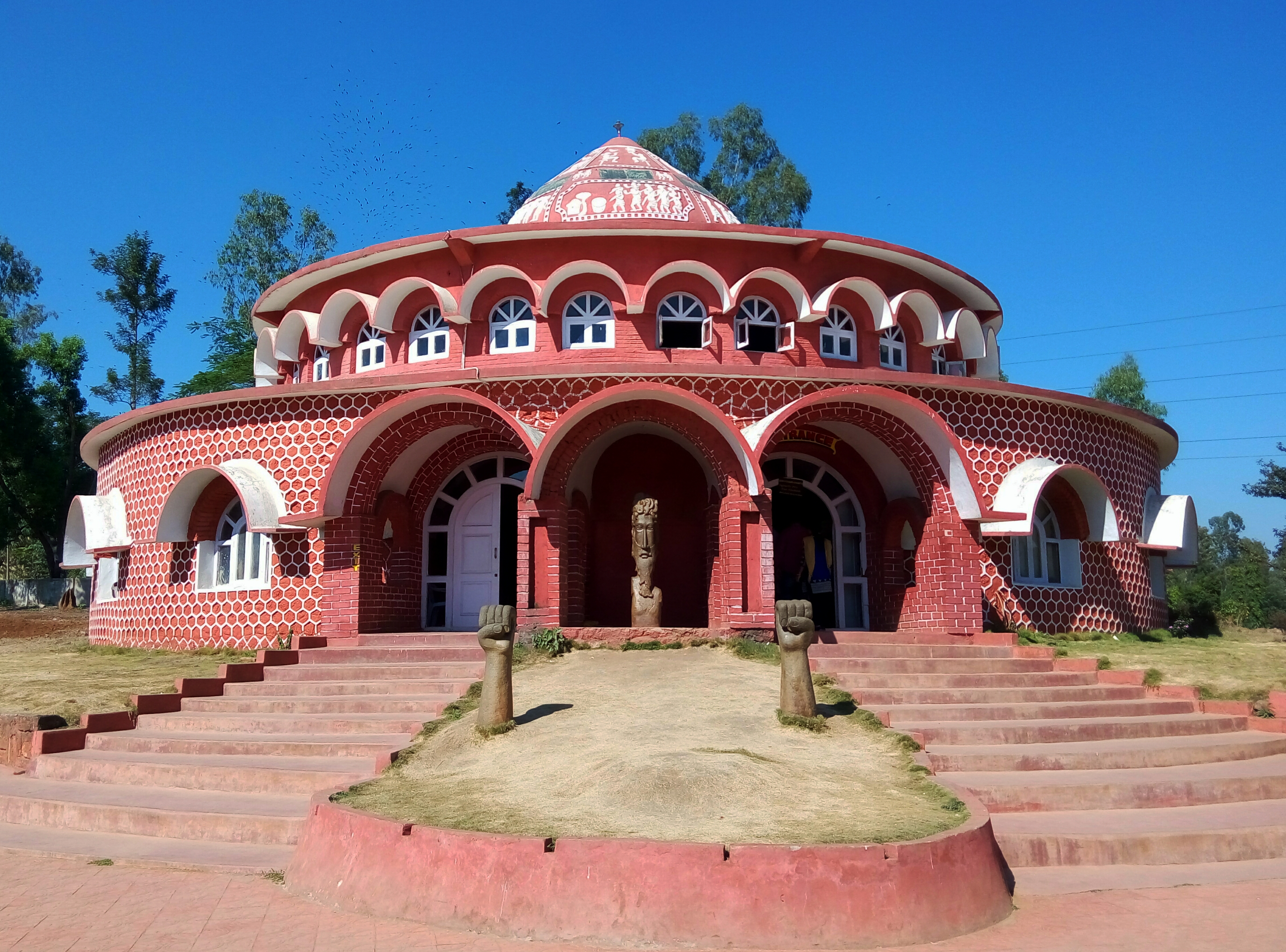
Tribal museum at Araku

Araku Valley is a hill station in Alluri Sitharama Raju district. The Anantagiri and Sunkarimetta Reserved Forest, which are part of Araku Valley, are rich in biodiversity and also. It has thick forests, coffee plantations, waterfalls.

Horsley Hills is a summer hill resort in the Annamayya district of Andhra Pradesh. It is situated at an elevation of 1,265 metres and attracts many tourists. The site which is the departure point for the Koundinya Wildlife Sanctuary at a distance of 87 km (54 mi). The Papi Hills located in Khammam district near Bhadrachalam surrounding the Godavari River are also famous.

Coringa Wild Life Sanctuary near Kakinada is the second-largest stretch of mangrove forests in India with 24 mangrove tree species and more than 120 bird species. It is home to the critically endangered white-backed vulture and the long billed vulture.

=== Fields and lakes ===
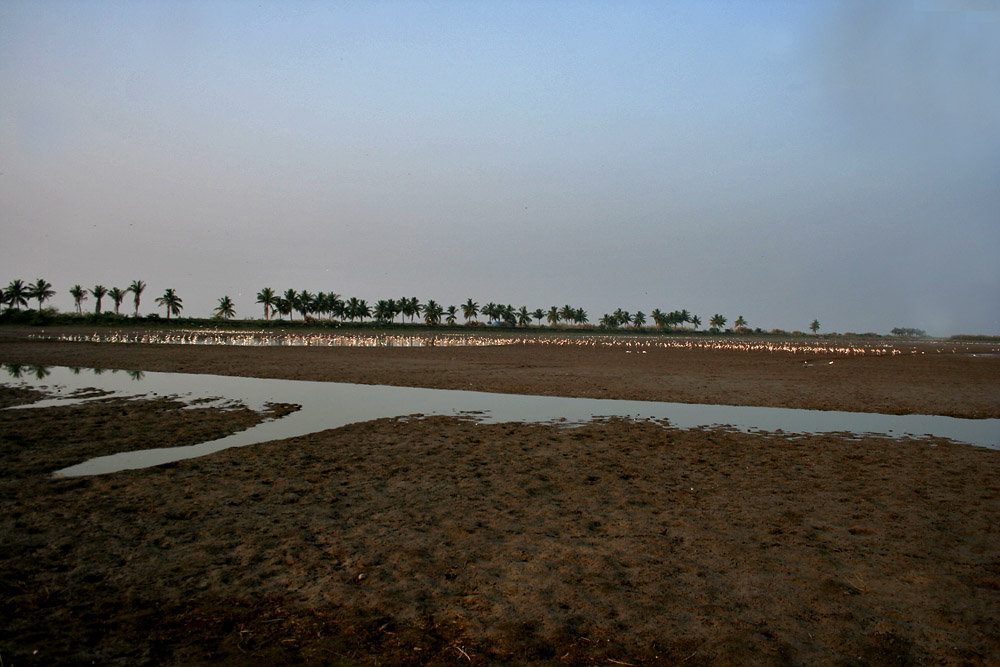
Birds gather at Kolleru Lake

Pulicat lake in Tirupati district.

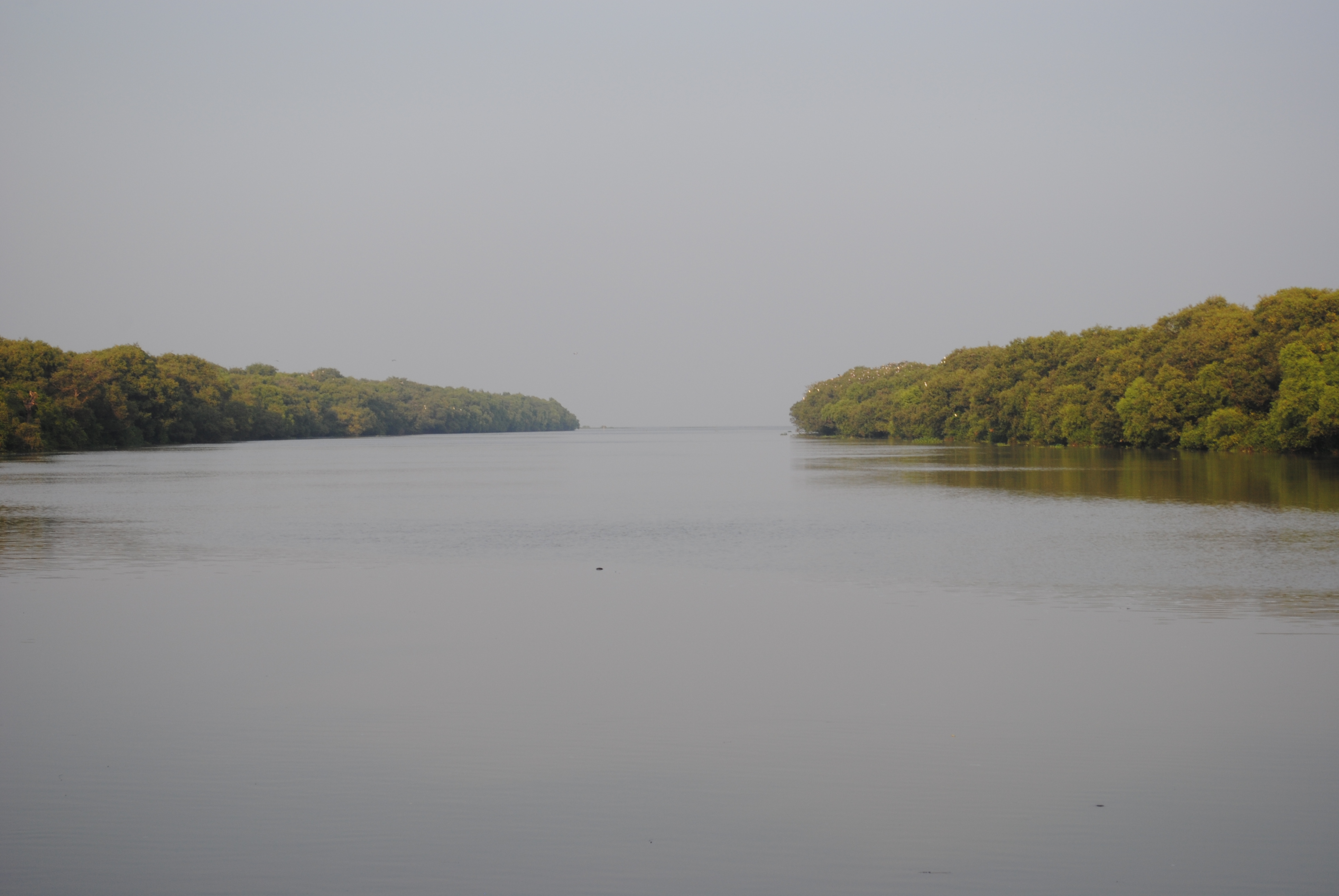
Coringa Wildlife Sanctuary

Konaseema is a place in East Godavari for nature lovers, with scenic greenery of lush paddy fields and coconut groves along the banks of river Godavari and its canals.

Kolleru Lake is one of the largest freshwater lakes in India. It is a located between Krishna and Godavari delta. The lake was declared as a wildlife sanctuary, and designated a wetland of international importance. The wildlife sanctuary covers an area of 308 km^{2}. During the winter season, many birds such as Siberian crane, ibis, and painted storks migrate here from Siberia and other countries to nest at the sanctuary. The sanctuary is situated about 15 km from Eluru and 65 km from the city of Vijayawada.

== Religious and pilgrimage sites ==
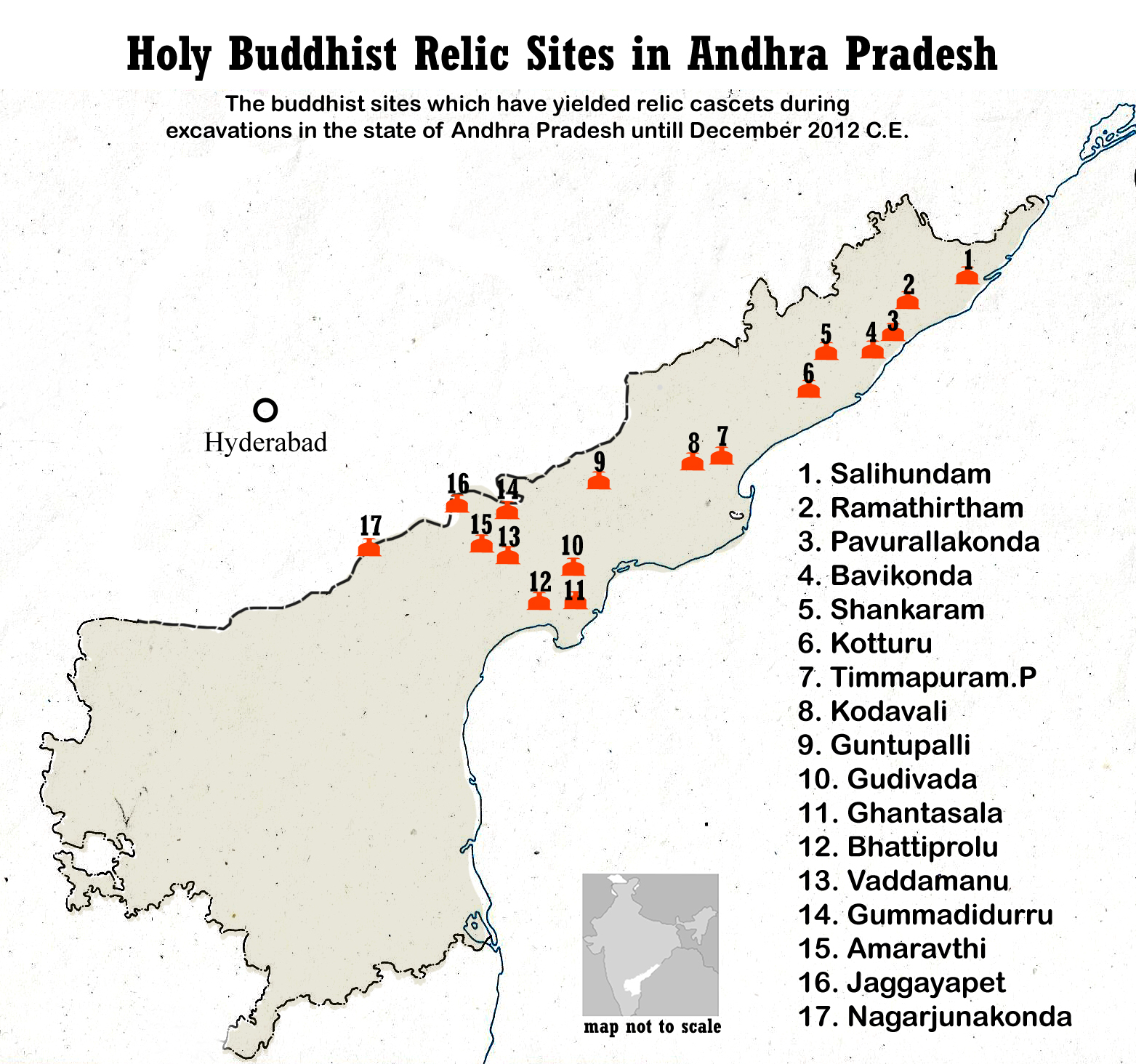
Holy relic sites map of Andhra Pradesh

A number of festivals are organized with thousands of tourists visiting temples of Andhra Pradesh. Some notable temples are:

- Tirumala Venkateswara Temple in Tirumala located at the town of Tirupati in Tirupati district is an important pilgrimage site for Hindus throughout India. It is one of the richest pilgrimage temple of any religious faith in the world. It is the abode of Venkateswara.
- Ranganayakula swami Temple in Nellore it is only Temple in world.
- Penchalakona Lakshmi narasimha swami Temple in Nellore district.
- Mallikarjuna Swamy temple situated at Srisailam in the Nallamala Hills of Nandyal district, is the abode of Mallikarjuna Shiva and is one of the twelve Jyotirlinga shrines in India. Rama himself installed the Sahasralinga, while the Pandavas lodged the Panchapandava lingas in the temple courtyard. The Vijayanagara Empire built a number of monuments, including the Srisailam and Lepakshi temples.
- Kanaka Durga Temple of the goddess Durga is situated on the Indrakeeladri Hill in the city of Vijayawada on the banks of Krishna River. A large number of pilgrims attend the colourful celebrations of Tepotsavam and for a holy dip in the Krishna River during the festival of Dusshera.
- Simhachalam, located on a hill 20 kilometres (12 mi) north of the Visakhapatnam city centre, is another popular pilgrimage site of national importance. Simhachalam is said to be the abode of the savior-god Narasimha.

The five ancient Hindu temples of Shiva, known as Pancharama Kshetras, are located at Amararama, Draksharama, Somarama, Ksheerarama and Kumararama. Other religious places include Srikalahasti temple in Srikalahasti in the Tirupati district, Raghavendra Swami Mutt in Mantralayam of Kurnool district, Venkateswara temple in Dwaraka Tirumala of Eluru district, Annavaram temple in Kakinada district and Arasavalli Surya temple in Srikakulam District are also located in the state.

Religious sites in Sri Sathya Sai District include Prashanthi Nilayam in Puttaparthi, the home of Sathya Sai Baba, as well as Lepakshi, home of a temple and statue of the Nandi bull.

Islam is also common religion, with a number of mosques built during the reigns of Muslim rulers. One of the famous is Shahi Jamia Masjid in Adoni of Kurnool district. There are a number of churches constructed centuries ago with historical significance. One of them is the Gunadala Church at Vijayawada.

The state has numerous Buddhist centres at Amaravati, Nagarjuna Konda, Bhattiprolu, Ghantasala, Nelakondapalli, Dhulikatta, Bavikonda, Thotlakonda, Salihundam, Pavurallakonda, Bojjannakonda (Sankaram), Phanigiri and Kolanpaka.

== See also ==
- List of tourist attractions and events in Visakhapatnam
- Tourism in India
