= Rajiv Smruthi Bhavan =

Memorial and cultural centre

Coordinates: 17.717231°N 83.328225°E

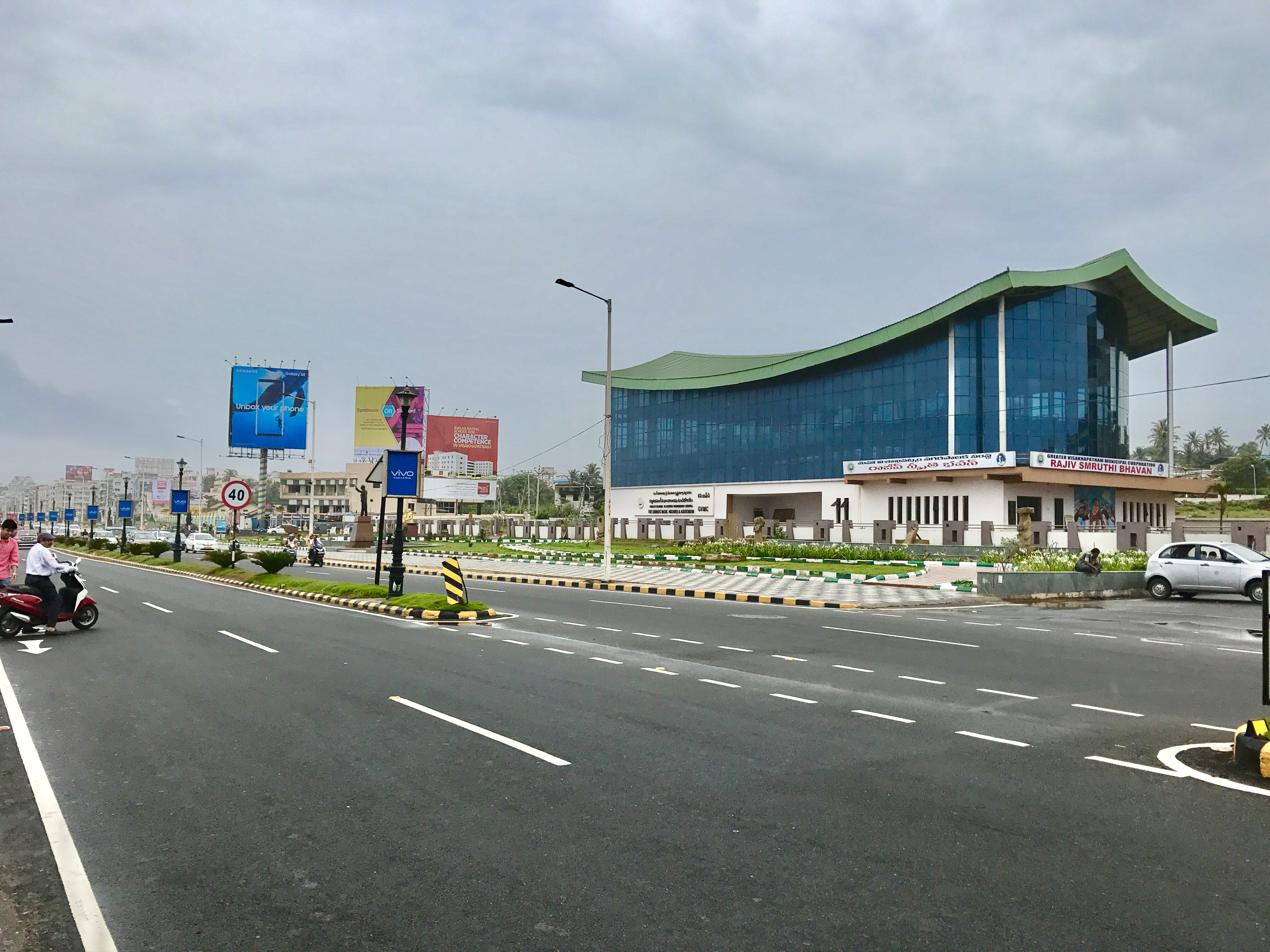
- Established: 2008
- Location: Beach road, Visakhapatnam
- Type: cultural centre
- Owner: Greater Visakhapatnam Municipal Corporation

Rajiv Smruthi Bhavan is a memorial and cultural center at Beach road, Pandurangapuram, Visakhapatnam. It was established in the year 2008 by the then Chief Minister of Andhra Pradesh Y. S. Rajasekhara Reddy.

== About ==
This memorial and cultural center is dedicated to the former Prime Minister of India Rajiv Gandhi. This venue is permanent photo exhibition of Rajiv Gandhi and is also a center for classical and carnatic music. The Sea Harrier Museum is now situated in the Rajiv Smruthi Bhavan.
