= Visakha Utsav =

- Location: Beach Road, Visakhapatnam
- Years active: 1997-present
- Website: http://www.visakhautsav.in/

Visakha Utsav is a tourism event every year conducted by the Andhra Pradesh Tourism Development Corporation and Visakhapatnam Metropolitan Region Development Authority at Visakhapatnam.

== History ==
Visakha Utsav first time started at the year of 1997 from that day onward every year in December month this tourism event is conducted by the Government of Andhra Pradesh.

== About ==
The main aim of the utsav is to promote the culture, arts, crafts, music and dance of Visakhapatnam and Andhra Pradesh.
