= Town Kotha Road =

Town Kotha Road టౌన్ కొత్త రోడ్
- Neighbourhood
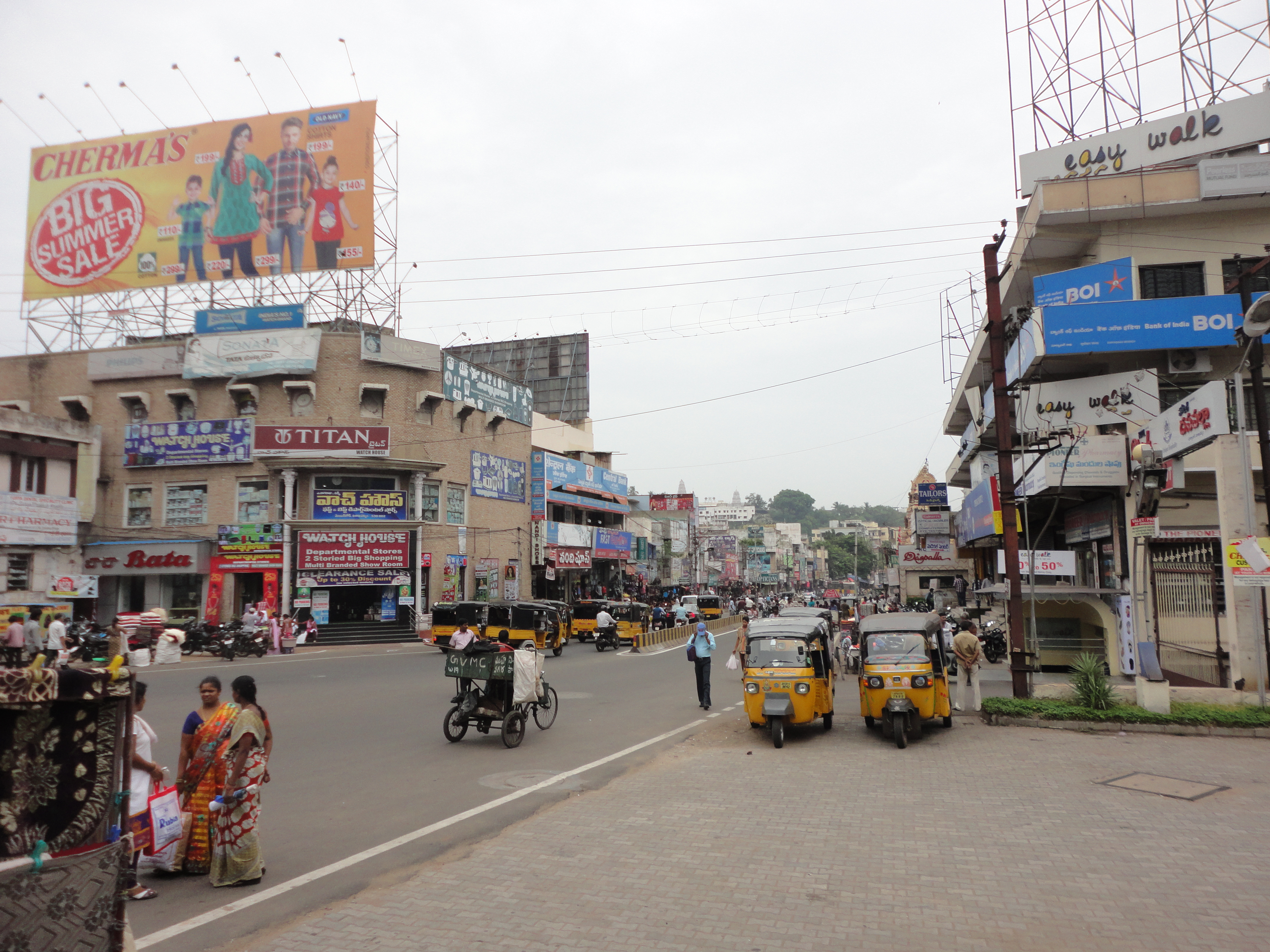

- Location in Visakhapatnam
- Coordinates: 17.701457°N 83.296178°E
- Country: India
- State: Andhra Pradesh
- District: Visakhapatnam

Government
  - Body: Greater Visakhapatnam Municipal Corporation

Languages
  - Official: Telugu
- Time zone: UTC+5:30 (IST)
- PIN: 530001
- Vehicle registration: AP-31

Town Kotha Road, also called Main Road of Visakhapatnam, is one of the important and old business roads in city.

== About ==
It has a key role in the business of Visakhapatnam, almost all types of goods are available on this road from electronics to clothes.

== Transport ==
It is well connected with all parts of the city. City buses are run to every corner of the city: Gajuwaka, NAD X Road, Malkapuram, Dwaraka Nagar, Maddilapalem, Arilova, Madhurawada, Aganampudi and Visakhapatnam Steel Plant.

APSRTC routes

Route number	Start	End	Via
25K	Bakkannapalem	Old Head Post Office	Madhurawada, Yendada, Hanumanthuwaka, Maddilapalem, RTC Complex, Jagadamba Centre, Town Kotharoad
25M	Marikavalasa	Old Head Post Office	Madhurawada, Yendada, Hanumanthuwaka, Maddilapalem, RTC Complex, Jagadamba Centre, Town Kotharoad
25G	Ganeshnagar	Old Head Post Office	Madhurawada, Yendada, Hanumanthuwaka, Maddilapalem, RTC Complex, Jagadamba Centre, Town Kotharoad
25S	YSR Nagar	Old Head Post Office	Madhurawada, Yendada, Hanumanthuwaka, Maddilapalem, RTC Complex, Jagadamba Centre, Town Kotharoad
25E	Kommadi	Old Head Post Office	Madhurawada, Yendada, Hanumanthuwaka, Maddilapalem, RTC Complex, Jagadamba Centre, Town Kotharoad
52D	Ravindra Nagar	Old Head Post Office	Town Kotharoad, Jagadamba Centre, RTC Complex, Maddilapalem, Hanumanthuwaka
52S	Sagarnagar	Old Head Post Office	Town Kotharoad, Jagadamba Centre, RTC Complex, Maddilapalem, Hanumanthuwaka, Visalakshinagar
52E	Peda Rushikonda	Old Head Post Office	Town Kotharoad, Jagadamba Centre, RTC Complex, Maddilapalem, Hanumanthuwaka, Yendada, Rushikonda
20A	HB Colony	Old Head Post Office	Town Kotharoad, Jagadamba Centre, RTC Complex, Gurudwar, Satyam Junction, Seethammadhara
17K	Bhimili	Old Head Post Office	Town Kotharoad, Jagadamba Centre, RTC Complex, Siripuram, Pedawaltair, Appughar, Sagarnagar, Rushikonda, Thimmapuram, INS Kalinga
60	Simhachalam	Old Head Post Office	Town Kotharoad, Jagadamba Centre, RTC Complex, Maddilapalem, Hanumanthuwaka, Arilova, Adavivaram
60C	Arilova Colony	Old Head Post Office	Town Kotharoad, Jagadamba Centre, RTC Complex, Maddilapalem, Hanumanthuwaka
6	Old Head Post Office	Simhachalam	Town Kotharoad, Convent, Kancharapalem, NAD Kotharoad, Gopalapatnam
6K	Old Head Post Office	Kothavalasa	Town Kotharoad, Convent, Kancharapalem, NAD Kotharoad, Gopalapatnam, Vepagunta, Pendurthi
12D	RTC Complex	Devarapalle	Railway New Colony, Kancharapalem, NAD Kotharoad, Gopalapatnam, Vepagunta, Pendurthi, Kothavalasa
300c	RTC Complex	Chodavaram	Railway New Colony, Kancharapalem, NAD Kotharoad, Gopalapatnam, Vepagunta, Pinagadi, Sabbavaram
333K	Town Kotharoad	K.Kotapadu	Railway New Colony, Kancharapalem, NAD Kotharoad, Gopalapatnam, Vepagunta, Pinagadi
