= Burujupeta =

- Neighbourhood
- Location in Visakhapatnam
- Coordinates: 17.700482°N 83.297607°E
- Country: India
- State: Andhra Pradesh
- District: Visakhapatnam

Government
  - Body: Greater Visakhapatnam Municipal Corporation

Languages
  - Official: Telugu
- Time zone: UTC+5:30 (IST)
- PIN: 530001
- Vehicle registration: AP-31

Burujupeta is a locality in One Town area, Visakhapatnam city. "Burujupeta" comes from "Buruju," a Telugu loan word from Persian and Arabic meaning fort. The temple of Visakhapatnam's goddess deity Sri Kanaka Mahalakshmi is found in the city.

== Temple ==
The Kanaka Maha Lakshmi Temple is located within the city. On the first Thursday of Agrahayana masaam, the area is busy with devotees of the temple.
