= CENTRAL, Visakhapatnam =

Visakhapatnam Central
- Location: Suryabagh, Visakhapatnam, India
- Coordinates: 17.708918°N 83.300147°E
- Opened: 2011
- Owner: Future Group
- Floors: 5
- Website: centralandme.com

Vizag Central is a shopping mall in Visakhapatnam, India, located on the Suryabagh the mall is operating with the Central Brand . The mall has cinemas, food courts, cloth stores, gaming, books, coffee shops and restaurants. The shopping space is spread over four levels with Mukta Cinemas located on fifth floor.

The mall was launched in 2011 with a total built up area of 1,50,000 sqft. The owners, Future Group, all type of brands are available in this mall.
