= Kanaka Maha Lakshmi Temple =

Sri Kanaka Maha Lakshmi Temple
- Location in Visakhapatnam

Religion
- Affiliation: Hinduism
- Deity: Sri Kanaka Maha Lakshmi

Location
- Location: Burujupeta, Visakhapatnam
- State: Andhra Pradesh
- Country: India
- Interactive map of Sri Kanaka Maha Lakshmi Temple
- Coordinates: 17.7005216°N 83.2960083°E

Website
- http://srikanakamahalakshmitemple.org/

Sri Kanaka Maha Lakshmi is the presiding deity of Visakhapatnam locals. The temple is located in Burujupeta of Visakhapatnam city. The temple temple is dedicated to Goddess Lakshmi who resides there in the form of Kanaka Mahalakshmi.

== Legend ==
The idol of the goddess is swaymbhu (self emerging) and appear to have one arm missing. According to the legend of the goddess, particularly prevalent in local traditions (sthala-māhātmya) from the state of Andhra Pradesh, suggests the missing arm is a result of a self-imposed vow. According to this belief, Kanak Mahalakshmi deliberately cut off her arm, swearing never to bestow her wealth upon the ungrateful. She is said to grant wealth only to those who possess adhikāra (worthiness) and śuddhi (inner purity), and not merely to those who ask for it. This is because she is believed to not only bless the deserving but also to strip wealth from those who are corrupt or unrighteous (adharmic).

Another interpretation states that the missing arm symbolizes her true form, which is believed to be nija śrī aśeṣa svarūpa—meaning her inexhaustible and boundless essence. In this view, no physical statue or murti can fully contain her complete form. The incomplete depiction is a visual metaphor for the fact that her golden, abundant wealth is not something that can be contained or fully depicted. Instead, it is a spiritual resource that is not merely earned through work but is unlocked by karma through proper spiritual conduct and devotion. The academic sources on this specific iconographic detail are scarce, and these explanations are primarily rooted in oral traditions and regional religious texts.
