= Beach Road, Visakhapatnam =

Road in Visakhapatnam, India

Coordinates: 17.790595°N 83.385866°E

Beach Road
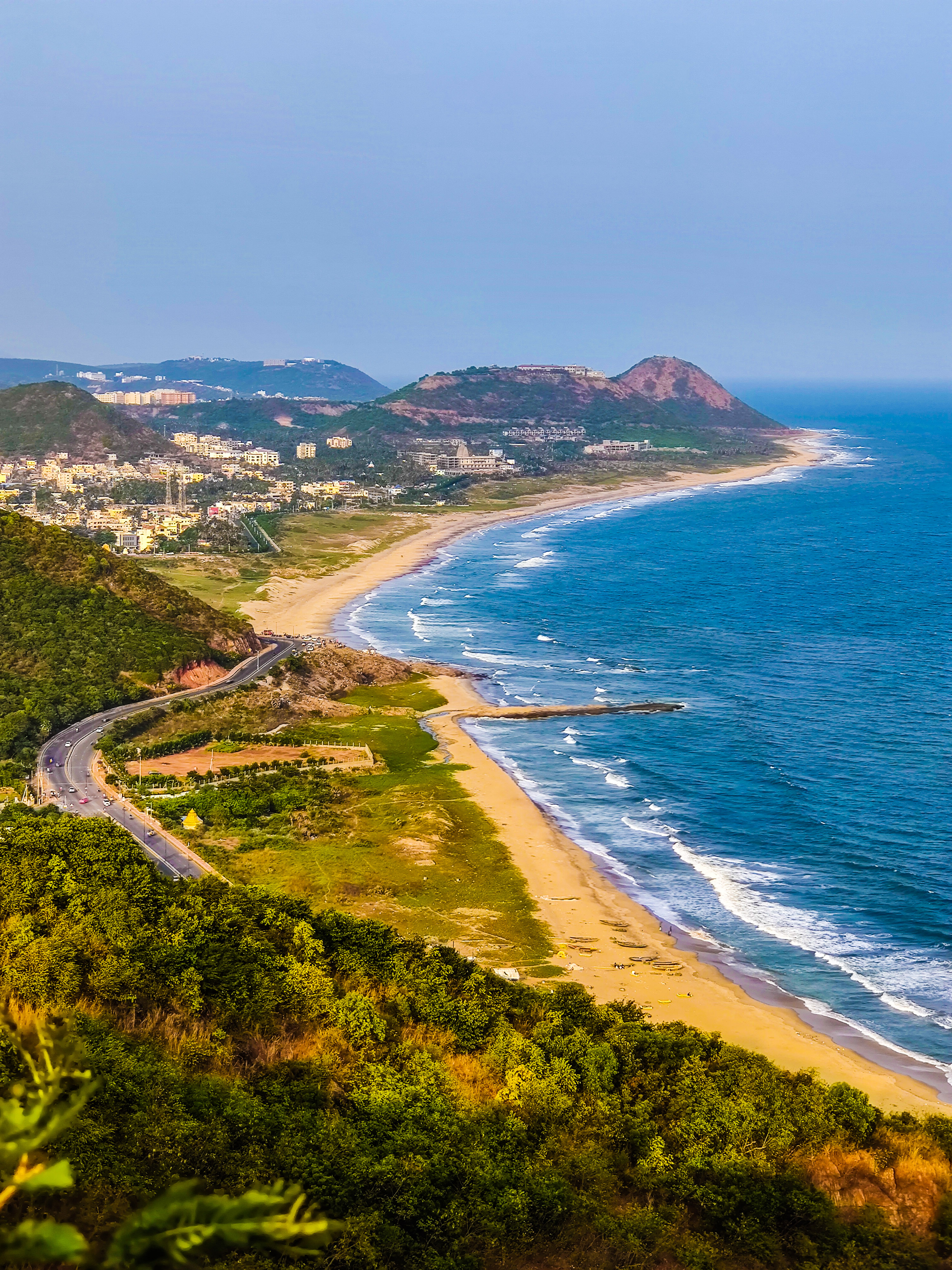
- Beach Road from Kailasagiri

Route information
- Length: 19.8 mi (31.9 km)
- Existed: 2002–present

Major junctions
- From: Visakhapatnam Port
- To: Bheemili Beach

Location
- Country: India
- State: Andhra Pradesh

Highway system
- Roads in India; Expressways; National; State; Asian; State Highways in Andhra Pradesh

Beach Road is a major roadway in Visakhapatnam. It is home to tourist destinations such as RK Beach and Kailasagiri. The Beach Road has cultural importance with the presence of buildings and structures such as, Rajiv Smruthi Bhavan (city's cultural hub), Annamayya Mandapam, AU Convention Center and organising rallies, city parades etc.

== Development works ==
The Visakhapatnam beach road to Bhimli will be developed at a cost of Rs 200 crore to promote tourism as a part of the city project "Vizag to develop beach road under smart city project."
