= Kailasagiri =

Park in Visakhapatnam, India

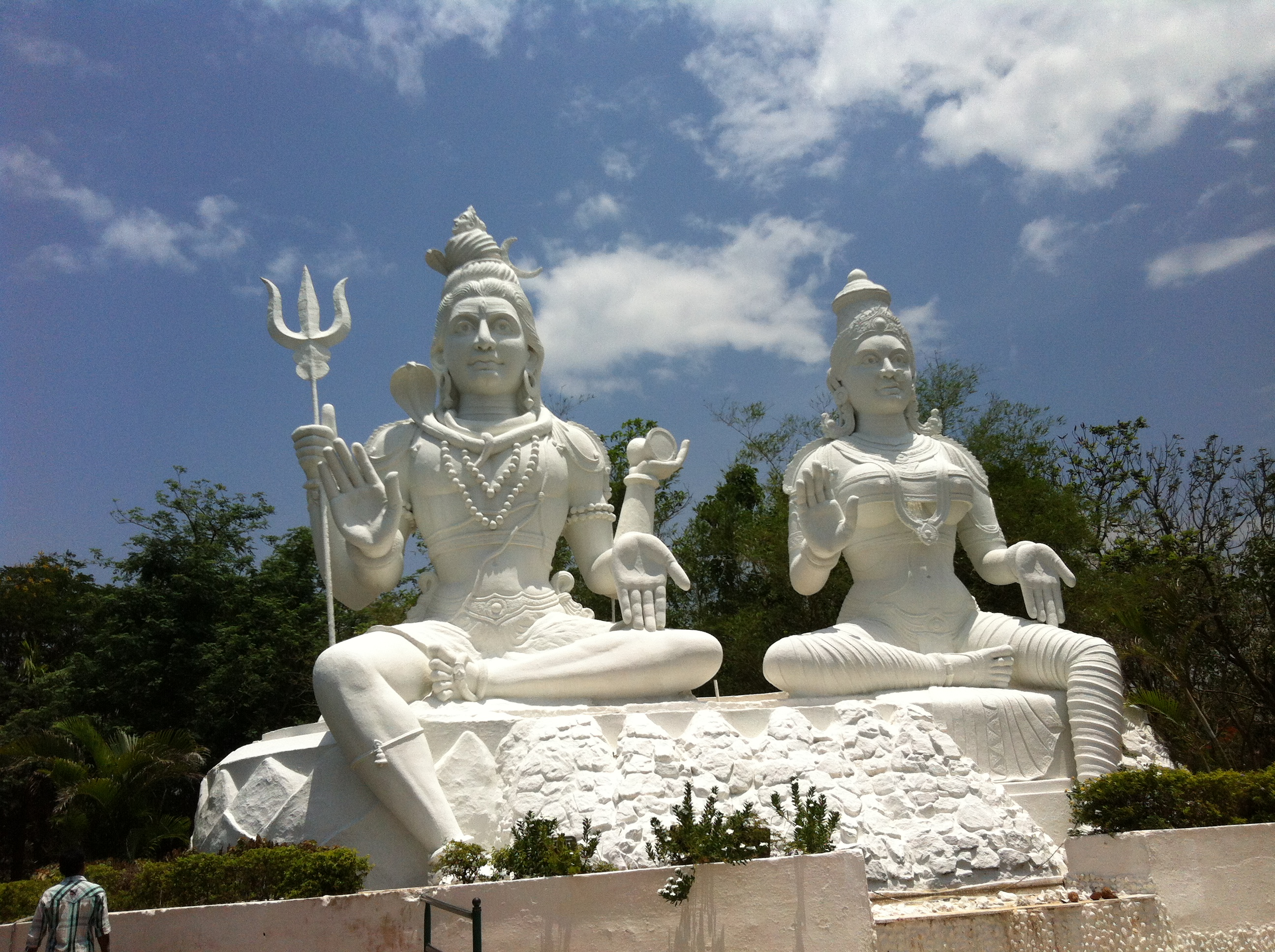
- Shiva-Parvati statue at Kailasagiri
- Interactive map of Kailasagiri
- Location: Visakhapatnam, Andhra Pradesh, India
- Coordinates: 17.748992°N 83.342236°E
- Area: 380 acres (150 ha)
- Elevation: 173 metres (568 ft)
- Operator: Visakhapatnam Metropolitan Region Development Authority
- Visitors: 3500-3600 daily
- Website: vmrda.gov.in/kailashgiri.aspx

Kailasagiri is a hilltop park in the city of Visakhapatnam in the Indian state of Andhra Pradesh. The park was developed by the Visakhapatnam Metropolitan Region Development Authority (VMRDA) and consists of land filled with native trees and other flora. The hill, 380 acres (150 ha)at 173 metres (568 ft), overlooks the city of Visakhapatnam.

Kailasagiri is located around 10 km from the Visakhapatnam Railway Station and around 8 km from Visakhapatnam Dwaraka Bus Station.

== History ==
The Government of Andhra Pradesh awarded Kailasagiri as its "Best Tourist Spot" in 2003.

== Ropeway ==
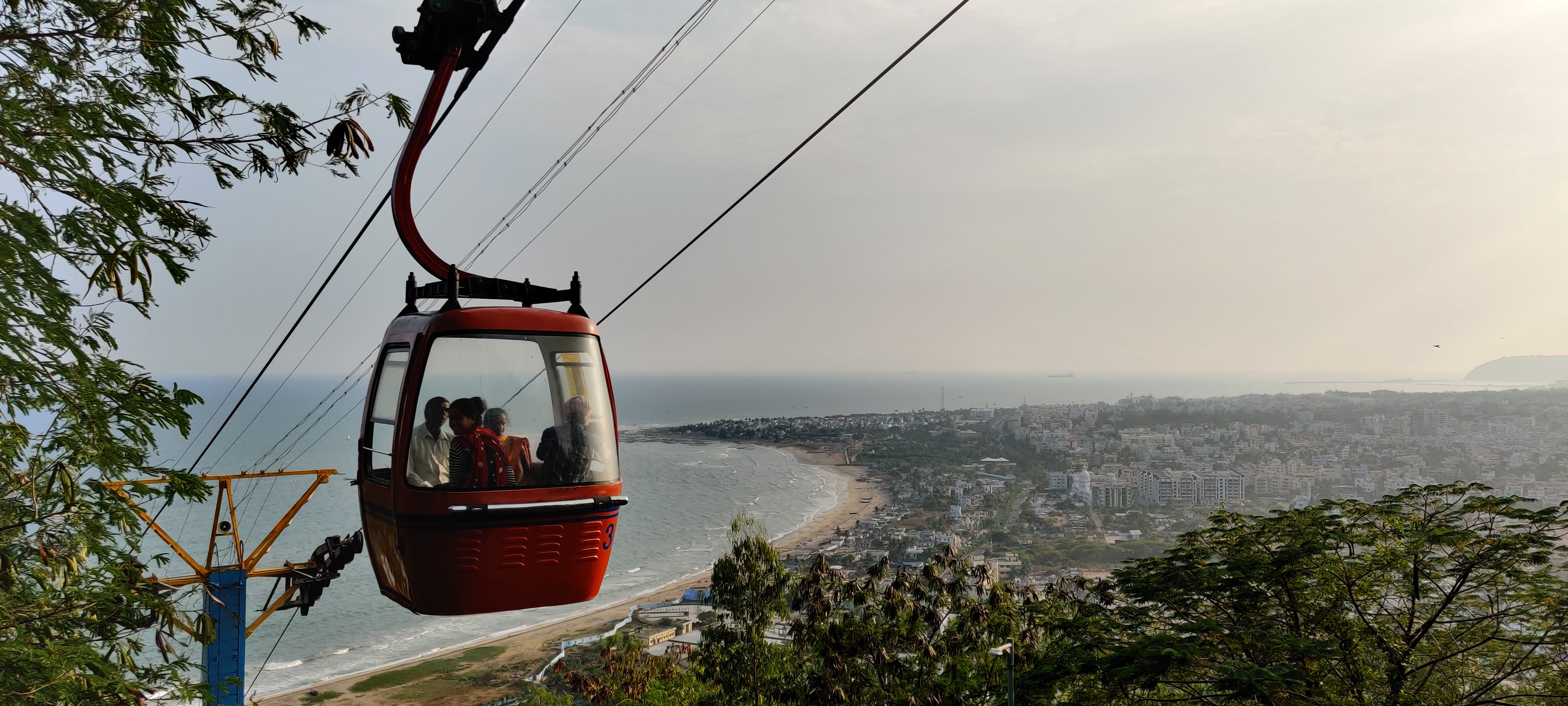
Ropeway car at Kailasagiri.

Kailasagiri Ropeway in Vishakhapatnam is an existing 350 meter long cable car system to the top of the hill, the first of its kind in Andhra Pradesh.

== Glassbridge ==
Kailasagiri Skybridge in Vishakhapatnam is an existing 55 meter glassbridge on the hilltop overlooking the city and east coast.

== Visitors ==
On average, around three hundred thousand Indian and foreign tourists visit the park every year.

== Conservation ==
To protect the environment, VMRDA has declared the hill a plastic-free zone.

== View from hilltop ==
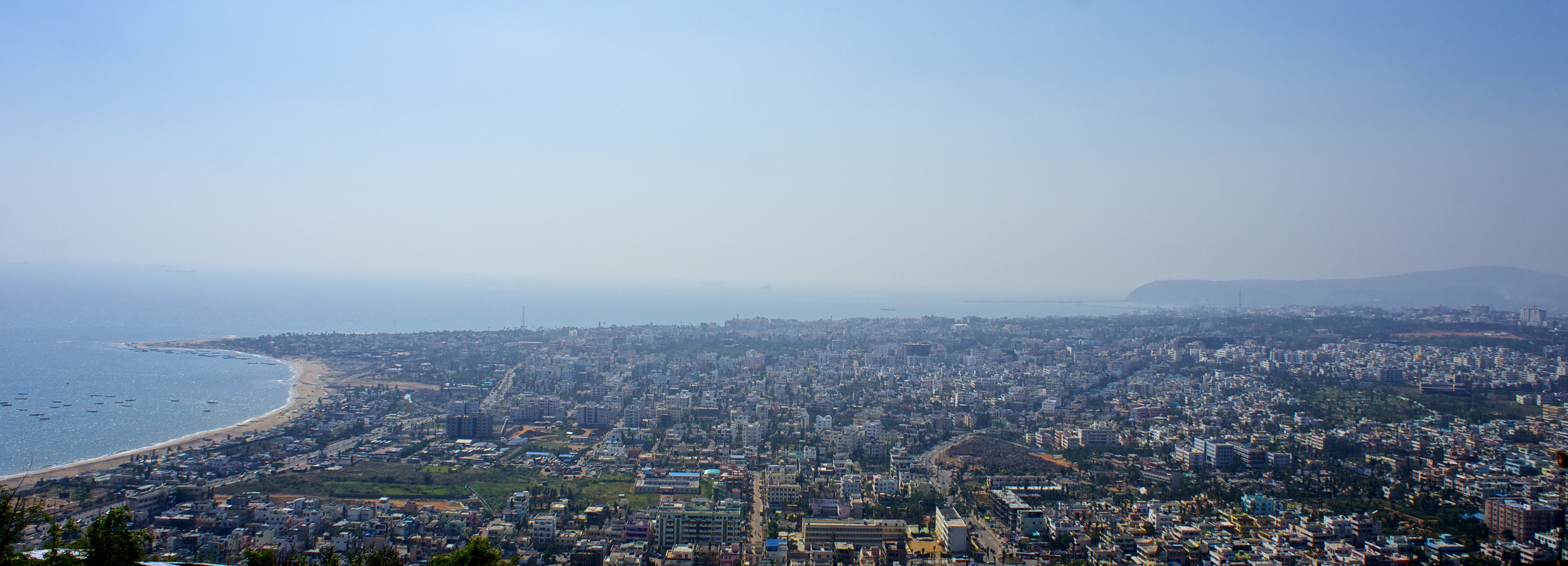
Visakhapatanam city skyline as seen from Kailasagiri

== Gallery ==
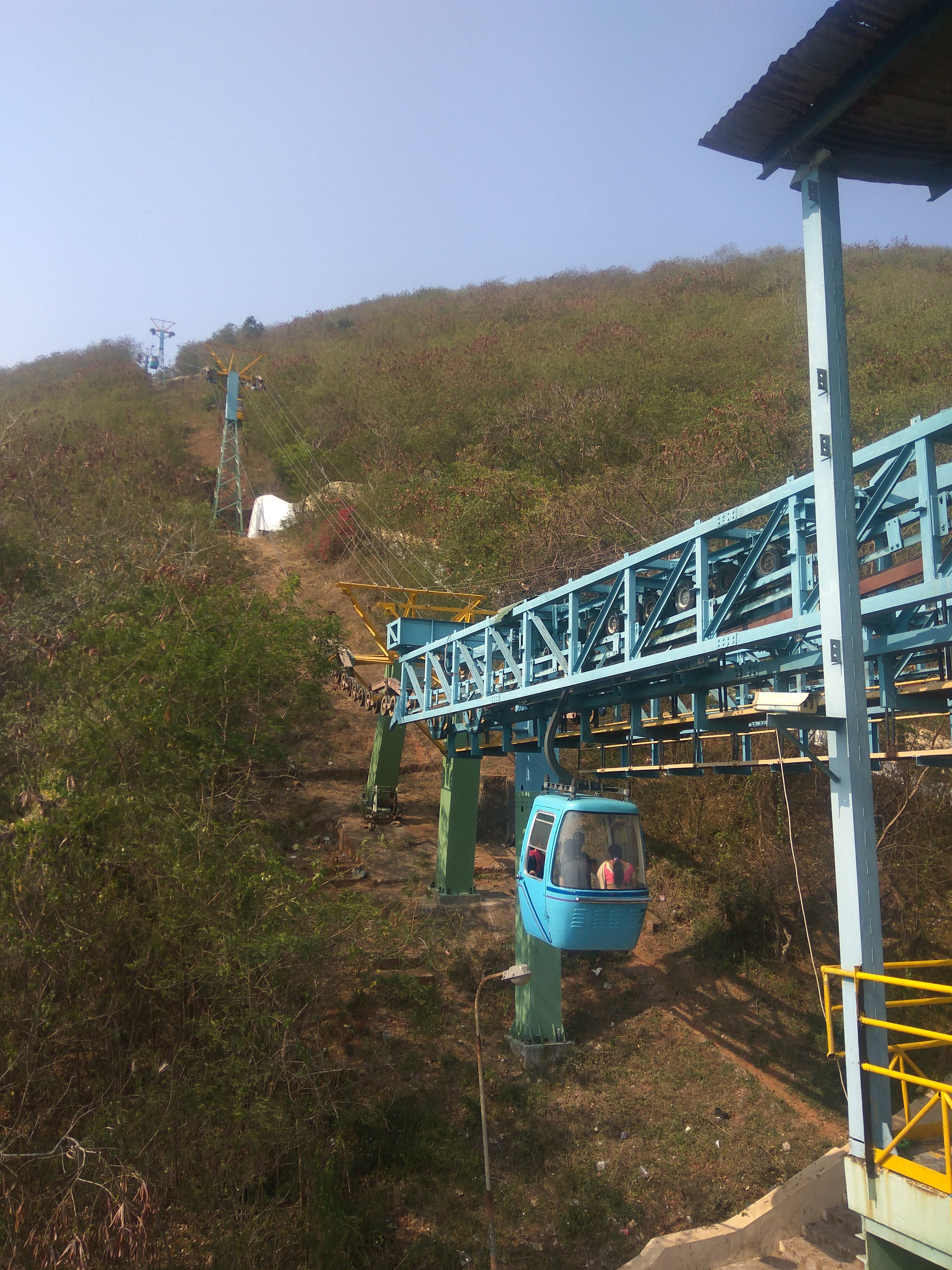
Ropeway at Kailasagiri.

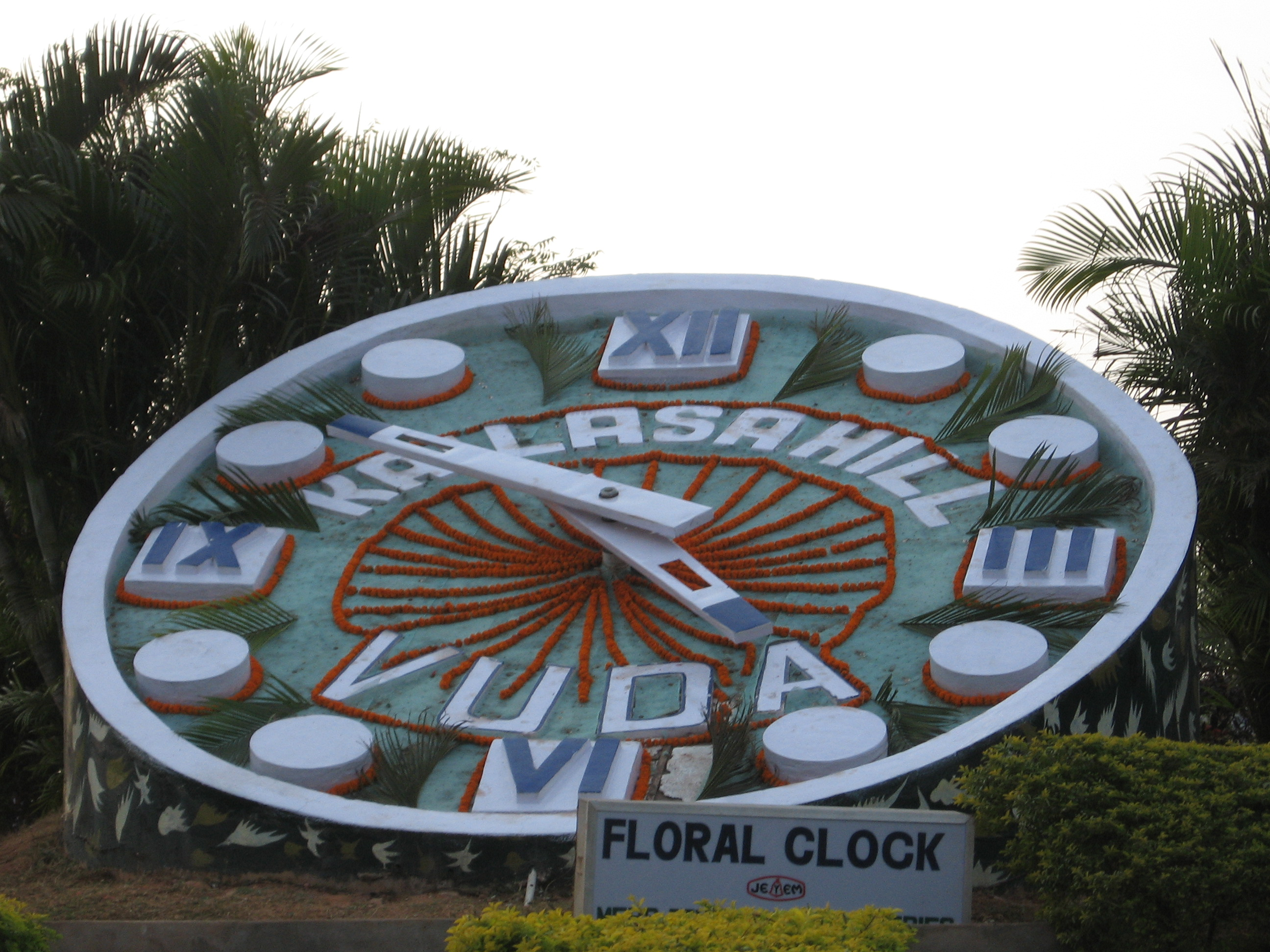
Floral clock at Kailasagiri.

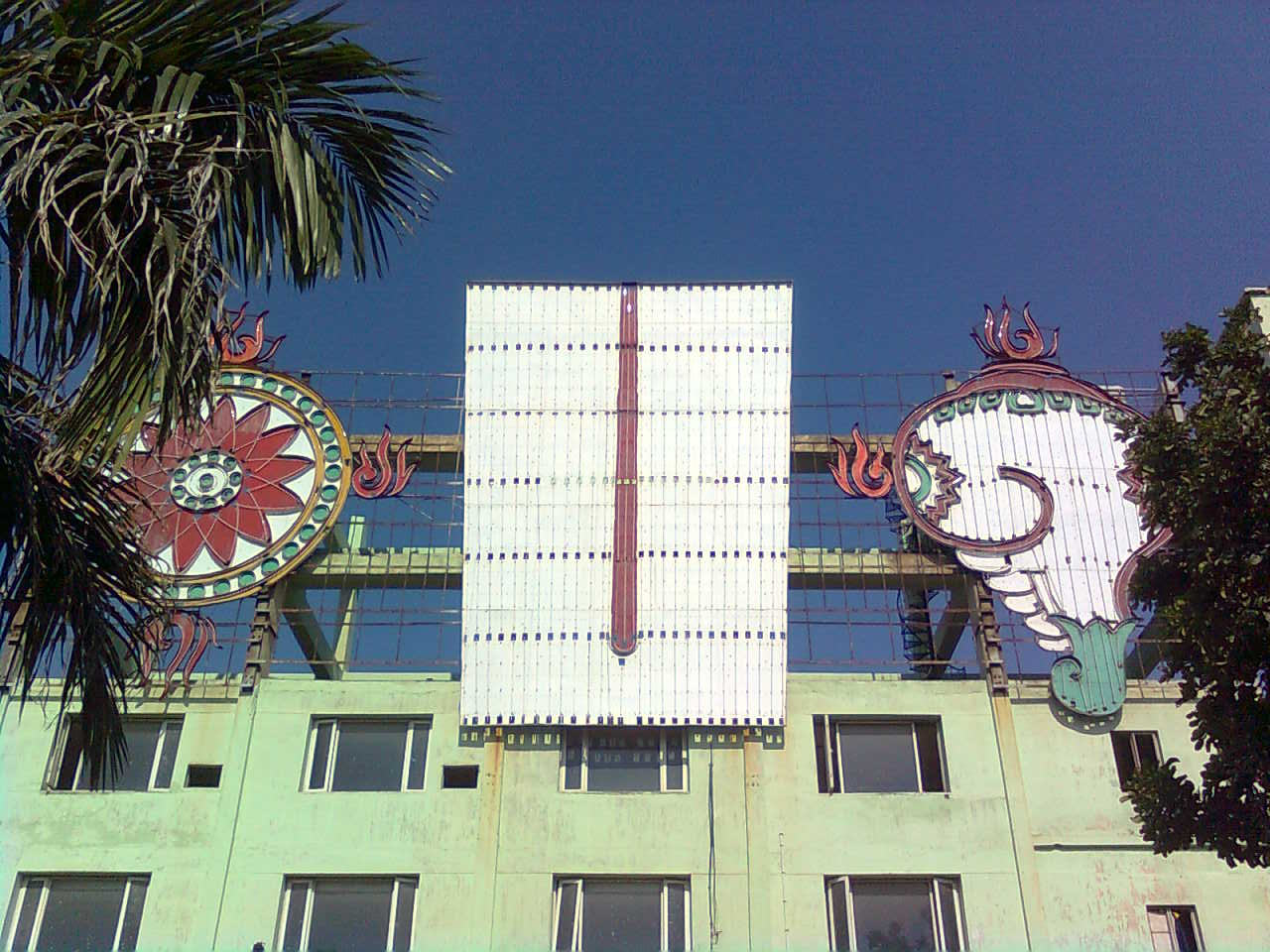
Namam display at Kailasagiri.

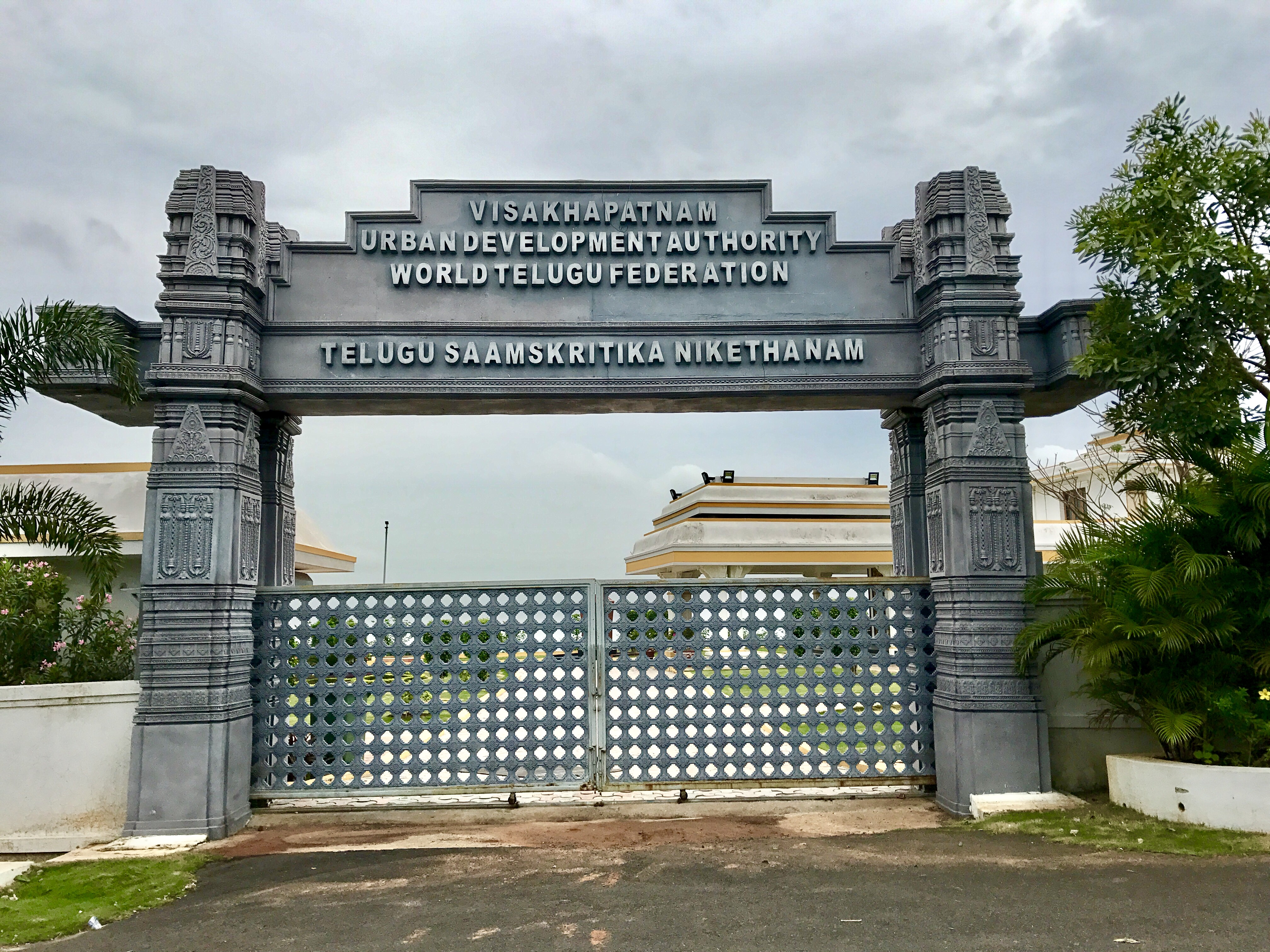
Telugu Samskruthika Niketanam at Kailasagiri.

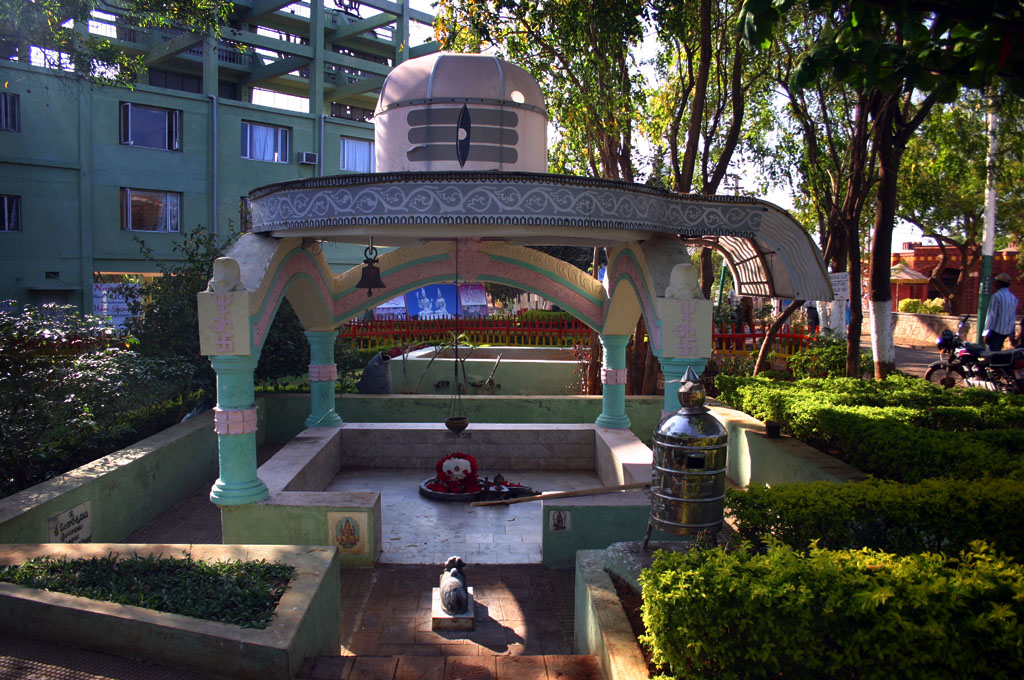
Lord Shiva Temple at Kailasagiri.

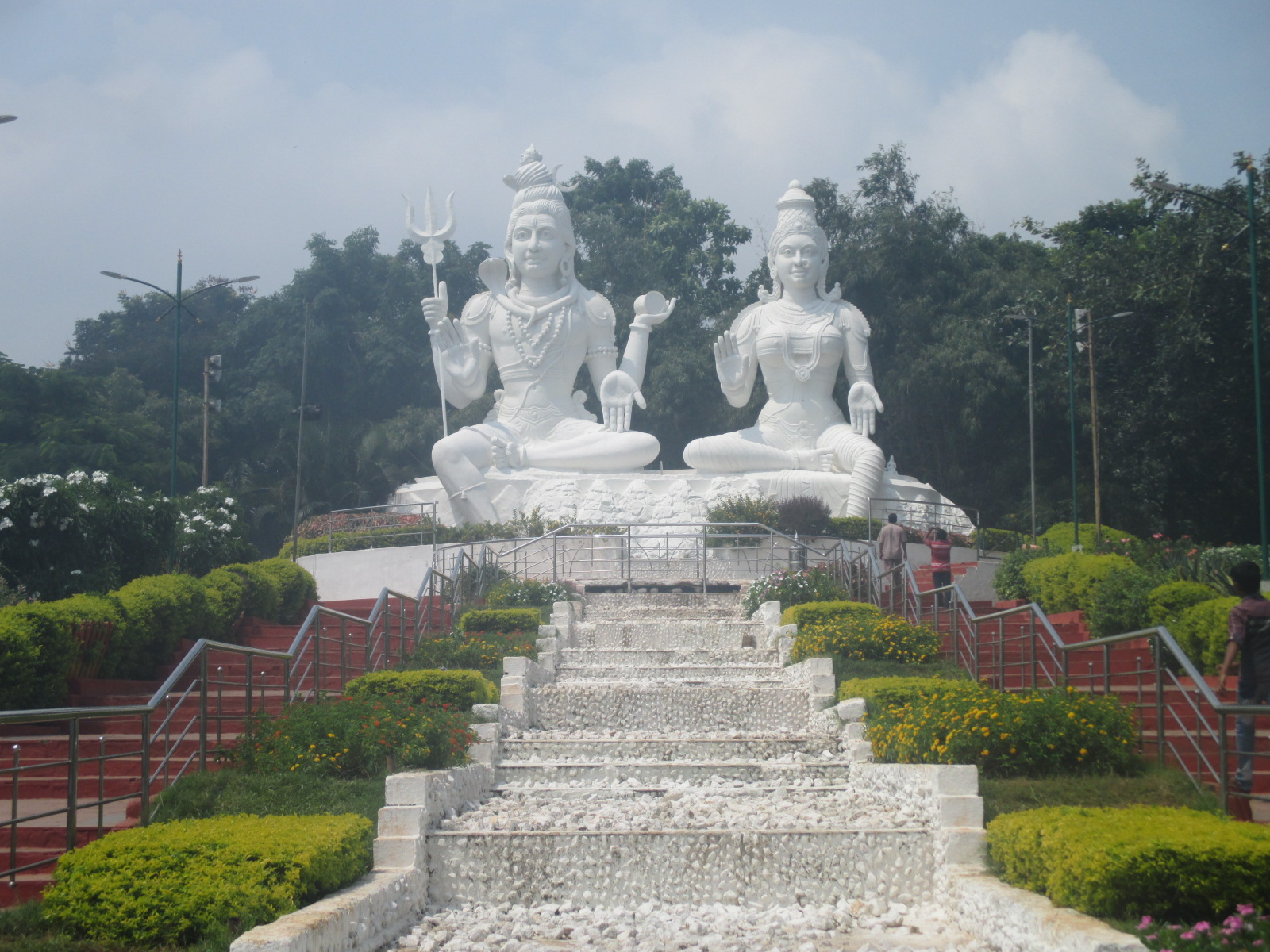
Shiva-Parvati statue at Kailasagiri.
