= Gudivada Gurunadha Rao =

Indian politician (1955–2001)

Member of Parliament, Lok Sabha
- In office 10 March 1998 – 26 April 1999
- Preceded by: Ayyanna Patrudu Chintakayala
- Succeeded by: Ganta Srinivasa Rao
- Constituency: Anakapalli

Member of Legislative Assembly Andhra Pradesh
- In office 1989-1994
- Preceded by: Alla Ramachandra Rao
- Succeeded by: M. Anjaneyulu l
- Constituency: Pendurthi

Personal details
- Born: 4 May 1955 Mindi, Visakhapatnam, Andhra Pradesh
- Died: November 22, 2001 (aged 46) Hyderabad
- Party: Indian National Congress
- Spouse: Gudivada Nagarani
- Children: 2, including Gudivada Amarnath

Gudivada Gurunadha Rao (4 May 1955 – 22 November 2001) was an Indian politician and social activist who belonged to Indian National Congress. He was the Member of parliament who represented Anakapalli Lok Sabha constituency of Andhra Pradesh from 1998 to 1999 and Andhra Pradesh Legislative Assembly member from 1989 to 1994.

== Life and background ==
Rao was born on 4 May 1955 in Mindi village of Visakhapatnam city of Andhra Pradesh. He was a political and social worker. During his education span, he passed secondary examination from a nearby school and then moved to Hindustan Shipyard Degree College, Visakhapatnam for further studies. He was actively participating in events and was organising the events for school children.

== Career ==
Rao has served as the Legislative Assembly member for Andhra Pradesh from 1989 to 1994 and minister of Technical Education from 1994 to 1998 in the state of Andhra Pradesh which was his hometown. In 1998, he was elected the member of parliament during the 12th General elections of India. It was 1998 when he served as a member at Committee on Commerce, Consultative Committee, and minister of Science and Technology till 1998.

== Personal life ==
Rao was born to Gudivada Appanna and at the age of 25, he married Nagamani on 23 August 1981. He had one daughter and one son. His wife is a politician. His son, Gudivada Amarnath, is also a politician and is elected as the Member of the Legislative Assembly from Anakapalle Assembly constituency.

== Death ==
Rao was 46 when he developed end-stage kidney disease and died on 22 November 2001 at Hyderabad, Andhra Pradesh.
