= Anakapalle Lok Sabha constituency =

Lok Sabha Constituency in Andhra Pradesh

Anakapalli AP-5
- Lok Sabha constituency
- Interactive Map Outlining Anakapalli Lok Sabha constituency

Constituency details
- Country: India
- Region: South India
- State: Andhra Pradesh
- Assembly constituencies: Chodavaram; Madugula; Anakapalli; Pendurthi; Elamanchili; Payakaraopet; Narsipatnam
- Established: 1962
- Reservation: None

Member of Parliament
- 18th Lok Sabha
- Incumbent C. M. Ramesh
- Party: BJP
- Alliance: NDA
- Elected year: 2024
- Preceded by: Beesetti Venkata Satyavathi

Anakapalli Lok Sabha constituency is one of the twenty-five lok sabha constituencies of Andhra Pradesh in India. It comprises seven assembly segments and belongs to Anakapalli district.

== Assembly segments ==
Anakapalli Lok Sabha constituency comprises the following Legislative Assembly segments:

#	Name	District	Member	Party	Leading (in 2024)
26	Chodavaram	Anakapalli	Kalidindi Suryana Naga Sanyasi Raju	TDP	BJP
27	Madugula	Anakapalli	Bandaru Satyanarayana Murthy	TDP	BJP
30	Anakapalli	Anakapalli	Konathala Ramakrishna	JSP	BJP
31	Pendurthi	Visakhapatnam	Panchakarla Ramesh Babu	JSP	BJP
32	Elamanchili	Anakapalli	Sundarapu Vijay Kumar	JSP	BJP
33	Payakaraopet (SC)	Anakapalli	Vangalapudi Anitha	TDP	BJP
34	Narsipatnam	Anakapalli	Chintakayala Ayyanna Patrudu	TDP	BJP

== Members of Parliament ==
Year	Member	Party
1962	Missula Suryanarayana Murti	Indian National Congress
1967	Missula Suryanarayana Murti	Indian National Congress
1971	S. R. A. S. Appala Naidu	Indian National Congress
1977	S. R. A. S. Appala Naidu	Indian National Congress
1980	S. R. A. S. Appala Naidu	Indian National Congress
1984	P. Appalanarasimham	Telugu Desam Party
1989	Konathala Ramakrishna	Indian National Congress
1991	Konathala Ramakrishna	Indian National Congress
1996	Chintakayala Ayyanna Patrudu	Telugu Desam Party
1998	Gudivada Gurunadha Rao	Indian National Congress
1999	Ganta Srinivasa Rao	Telugu Desam Party
2004	Pappala Chalapathirao	Telugu Desam Party
2009	Sabbam Hari	Indian National Congress
2014	Muttamsetti Srinivasa Rao	Telugu Desam Party
2019	Beesetti Venkata Satyavathi	YSR Congress Party
2024	C. M. Ramesh	Bharatiya Janata Party

== All Elections Summary ==
Year	Reservation	Member	Sex	Party	Votes Gained	Runner-up	Sex	Party	Votes Gained
1962	None	Missula Suryanarayana Murti	M	Indian National Congress	96895	Villuri Venkataramana	M	Swatantra Party	80885
1967	None	Missula Suryanarayana Murti	M	Indian National Congress	165121	Villuri Venkataramana	M	Swatantra Party	162097
1971	None	S. R. A. S. Appala Naidu	M	Indian National Congress	215209	Villuri Venkataramana	M	Swatantra Party	69115
1977	None	S. R. A. S. Appala Naidu	M	Indian National Congress	199228	Pokkala Venkata Chalapathi	M	Bharatiya Lok Dal	163292
1980	None	S. R. A. S. Appala Naidu	M	Indian National Congress	178139	Pusapati Ananda Gajapati Raju (born 1950)	M	Janata Party (Secular)	149016
1984	None	P. Appalanarasimham	M	Telugu Desam Party	322347	S. R. A. S. Appala Naidu	M	Indian National Congress	147531
1989	None	Konathala Ramakrishna	M	Indian National Congress	299109	P. Appalanarasimham	M	Telugu Desam Party	299100
1991	None	Konathala Ramakrishna	M	Indian National Congress	261311	P. Appalanarasimham	M	Telugu Desam Party	250153
1996	None	Chintakayala Ayyanna Patrudu	M	Telugu Desam Party	327290	Konathala Ramakrishna	M	Indian National Congress	277118
1998	None	Gudivada Gurunadha Rao	M	Indian National Congress	321840	Chintakayala Ayyanna Patrudu	M	Telugu Desam Party	295915
1999	None	Ganta Srinivasa Rao	M	Telugu Desam Party	392984	Gudivada Gurunadha Rao	M	Indian National Congress	334520
2004	None	Pappala Chalapathirao	M	Telugu Desam Party	385406	Gandham Nanda Gopal	M	Indian National Congress	369992
2009	None	Sabbam Hari	M	Indian National Congress	369968	Nookarapu Surya Prakash Rao	M	Telugu Desam Party	317056
2014	None	Muttamsetti Srinivasa Rao	M	Telugu Desam Party	568463	Gudivada Amarnath	M	YSR Congress Party	520531
2019	None	Beesetti Venkata Satyavathi	F	YSR Congress Party	586226	Adari Anand Kumar	M	Telugu Desam Party	497034
2024	None	C. M. Ramesh	M	Bharatiya Janata Party	762069	Budi Mutyala Naidu	M	YSR Congress Party	465539

== Election results ==
=== 2024 ===
2024 Indian general elections: Anakapalli
Party	Candidate	Votes	%	±%
BJP	C. M. Ramesh	762,069	57.50	▲56.43
YSRCP	Budi Mutyala Naidu	4,65,539	35.13	▼12.20
NOTA	None of the above	26,235	1.98	▼0.84
Majority		2,96,530	22.37	▲15.17
Turnout		13,28,726	82.97	
BJP gain from YSRCP		Swing		

=== 2019 ===
2019 Indian general elections: Anakapalli
Party	Candidate	Votes	%	±%
YSRCP	Beesetti Venkata Satyavathi	586,226	47.33	
TDP	Adari Anand Kumar	497,034	40.13	
JSP	Chintala Partha Sarathi	82,588	6.66	
NOTA	None of the above	34,897	2.82	
BJP	Dr. Gandi Venkata Satyanarayana Rao	13,276	1.07	
Majority		89,192	7.20	
Turnout		12,40,456	81.54	
Registered electors		15,21,363		
YSRCP gain from TDP		Swing		

=== General Election 2014 ===
General Election, 2014: Anakapalli
Party	Candidate	Votes	%	±%
TDP	Muttamsetti Srinivasa Rao	568,463	49.51	+19.26
YSRCP	Gudivada Amarnath	520,531	45.34	N/A
Majority		47,932	4.17	−0.88
Turnout		1,148,072	81.92	+3.22
TDP gain from INC		Swing		

=== General Election 2009 ===
General Election, 2009: Anakapalli
Party	Candidate	Votes	%	±%
INC	Sabbam Hari	369,968	35.30	−12.01
TDP	Nookarapu Surya Prakasa Rao	317,056	30.25	−19.03
PRP	Allu Aravind	294,183	28.07	N/A
Majority		52,912	5.05	+3.08
Turnout		1,048,154	78.70	+2.26
INC gain from TDP		Swing	-12.01	

=== General Election 2004 ===
General Election, 2004: Anakapalli
Party	Candidate	Votes	%	±%
TDP	Pappala Chalapathirao	385,406	49.28	−3.47
INC	Nanda Gopal Gandham	369,992	47.31	+2.41
BSP	Sadaram Appala Raju	26,708	3.41	
Majority		15,414	1.97	
Turnout		782,106	76.44	+4.51
TDP hold		Swing		

=== General Election 1998 ===
General Election, 1998: Anakapalli
Party	Candidate	Votes	%	±%
INC	Gudivada Gurunadha Rao	321,840	43.96	
TDP	Chintakayala Ayyanna Patrudu	2,95,915	40.42	
BJP	P. V. Chalapathi Rao	1,14,360	15.62	
Margin of victory		25,925	3.54	
Turnout		7,32,115	72.56	
INC gain from TDP		Swing		

== See also ==
- List of constituencies of the Andhra Pradesh Legislative Assembly
