= Villuri Venkataramana =

Indian politician (1923–1978)

Member of Parliament, Rajya Sabha
- In office 1953–1962
- Constituency: Andhra Pradesh

Personal details
- Born: 15 May 1923 Gavarapalem, Anakapalli, Visakhapatnam, Madras Presidency, British India
- Died: 1978 (aged 54–55)
- Party: Swatantra Party, Krishikar Lok Party
- Other political affiliations: Indian National Congress

Villuri Venkataramana (15 May 1923 – 1978) was an Indian politician and farmers leader from Andhra Pradesh. He served as a Member of Parliament representing Andhra Pradesh in the Rajya Sabha from 1953 to 1962, the upper house of India's Parliament, as a member of the Indian National Congress. Venkataramana died in 1978.

== Early life ==
Venkataramana was born on 15 May 1923 in Gavarapalem, Anakapalli, then part of the Madras Presidency.

== Political career ==
Venkataramana was first elected to the Rajya Sabha at the age of 31. He served two terms there. He gained experience working under political stalwarts like Jawaharlal Nehru, Babu Jagjeevan Ram, Sarvepalli Radhakrishnan, and Lal Bahadur Shastri. He was a devoted disciple of N.G. Ranga and Gouthu Latchanna. Despite being critical of the Congress for its governance failures, he also invested in farmers' welfare. He transitioned from representing the Swatantra Party to the Krishikar Lok Party. Throughout his career, he remained committed to his ideologies. He thrice ran for parliament from the Anakapalli constituency, in 1962, 1967, and 1971. He lost to Missula SuryaNarayana Murti by 16,010 votes in 1962, then by 3,024 votes in 1967, and finally to S.R.A.S. Appala Naidu by 146,094 votes. Despite offers from the Congress for central ministerial positions, he remained steadfast in his ideologies and continued his association with the Krishikar Lok Party.

== Rail yatra ==
For the first time in India, he traveled to Delhi with farmers and facilitated a meeting with the President.

== VV Ramana Cooperative Sugars ==
Venkataramana was active in organizing farmers in the Anakapalle region. According to published accounts, when the Thummapala Sugars factory was scheduled for auction, he organized local farmers to raise funds to acquire the factory. The cooperative reportedly purchased the factory for ₹2.7 million (27 lakh rupees) and subsequently converted it into a cooperative sugar factory.

The cooperative sugar factory was later renamed VV Ramana Cooperative Sugars in his honor by the Government of Andhra Pradesh during the tenure of Chief Minister Y. S. Rajasekhara Reddy.

Several farmers' organizations in Anakapalle, including the Gowri Pradamika Seva Sangam and the Anakapalle Rythu Sangam, were also named in his honor in recognition of his contributions to the cooperative movement and the welfare of farmers.

== Festival ==
A temple is built in the Gavarapalem area of Anakapalle in his memory, and a festival is held there in January every year.
