= Thotada =

- village
- Interactive map of Thotada
- Location in Andhra Pradesh, India Thotada (India)
- Coordinates: 17.6333°N 83.1000°E
- Country: India
- State: Andhra Pradesh
- District: Anakapalli

Languages
  - Official: Telugu
- Time zone: UTC+5:30 (IST)
- PIN: 531001
- Telephone code: 91-8924

Thotada is a village near Anakapalle, Andhra Pradesh. Thotada is located 3 kilometers to the west of Anakapalle.

Its panchayati jurisdiction includes neighboring villages Gavarla Anakapalle and Mulapeta. River Sharada flows through this village.

The primary occupation of this area is Agriculture. Important crops are,

1. Paddy
2. Sugarcane
3. Sesame (Nuvvulu)
