= Peela Govinda Satyanarayana =

Indian politician (born 1965)

Member of Legislative Assembly Andhra Pradesh
- In office 2014–2019
- Preceded by: Ganta Srinivasa Rao
- Succeeded by: Gudivada Amarnath
- Constituency: Anakapalle

Chairman of Andhra Pradesh Urban Finance And Development Corporation

Peela Govinda Satyanarayana (Peela Govind) (born 18 August 1965) is an Indian politician from the Telugu Desam Party. He is an ex Member of the Andhra Pradesh Legislative Assembly from Anakapalle constituency. He was born in Pendurthi and lives in Anakapalle. He was announced as new chairman of Andhra Pradesh Urban Finance And Development Corporation on 25th September, 2024.
