= Pendurthi Assembly constituency =

Constituency of the Andhra Pradesh Legislative Assembly, India

Coordinates: 17.81°N 83.21°E

Pendurthi
- Constituency No. 31 for the Andhra Pradesh Legislative Assembly
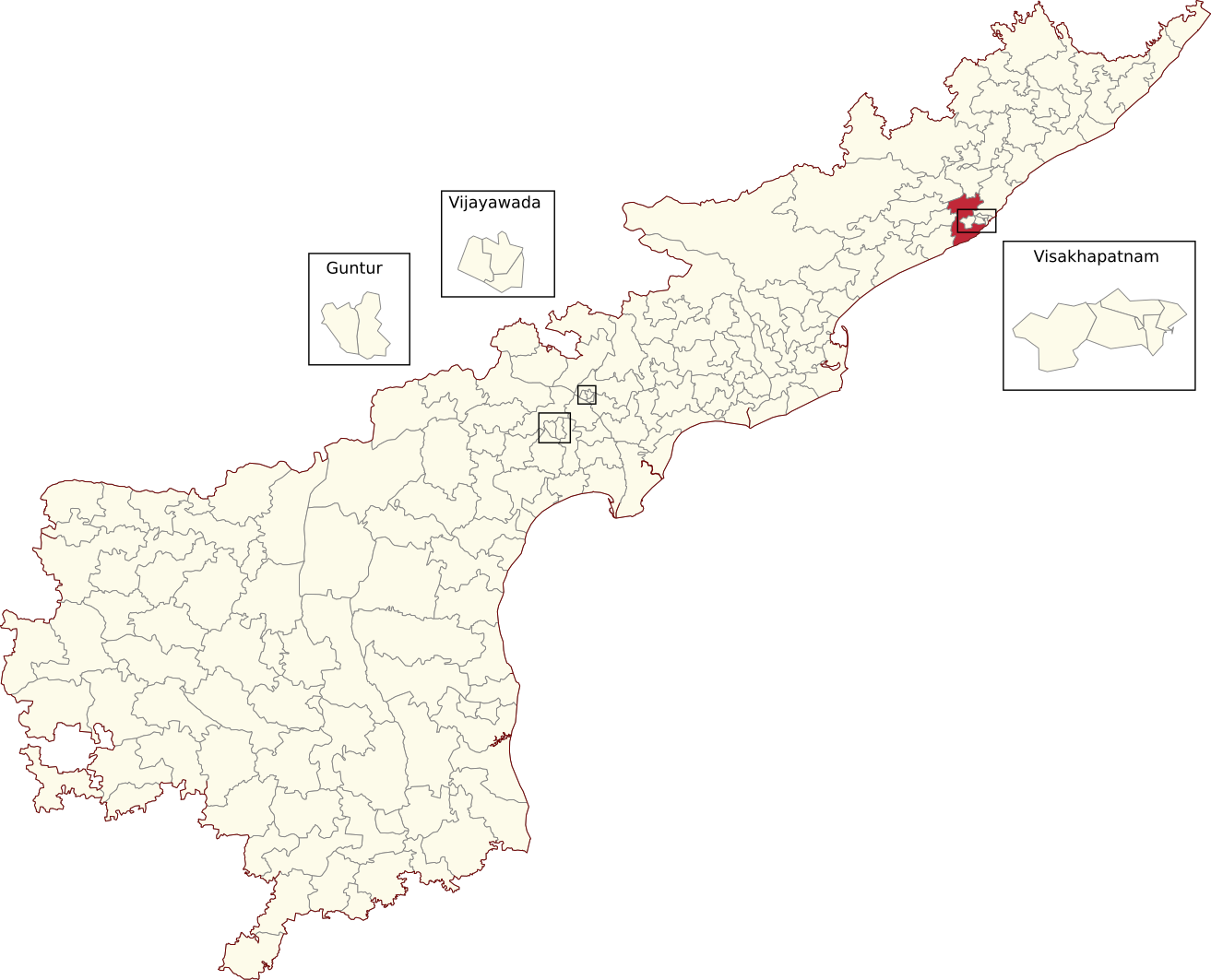
- Location of Pendurthi Assembly constituency within Andhra Pradesh

Constituency details
- Country: India
- Region: South India
- State: Andhra Pradesh
- District: Visakhapatnam (partially); Anakapalli (partially)
- Lok Sabha constituency: Anakapalli
- Established: 1978
- Total electors: 307056
- Reservation: None

Member of Legislative Assembly
- 16th Andhra Pradesh Legislative Assembly
- Incumbent Panchakarla Ramesh Babu
- Party: JSP
- Alliance: NDA
- Elected year: 2024

Pendurthi Assembly constituency is a constituency partially in Visakhapatnam district and Anakapalli district of Andhra Pradesh that elects representatives to the Andhra Pradesh Legislative Assembly in India. It is one of the seven assembly segments of Anakapalli Lok Sabha constituency.

Panchakarla Ramesh Babu is the current MLA of the constituency, having won the 2024 Andhra Pradesh Legislative Assembly election from Jana Sena Party. As of 2019, there are a total of 268,532 electors in the constituency. The constituency was established in 1978, as per the Delimitation Orders (1978).

== Mandals ==
The four mandals that form the assembly constituency are:

Mandal
Pedagantyada (excluding areas included in Gajuwaka(GVMC)), Visakhapatnam dist
Parawada, Anakapalle dist
Sabbavaram, Anakapalle dist
Pendurthi, Visakhaptnam dist

== Members of the Legislative Assembly ==
Year	Member	Political party
1978	Gudivada Appanna	Indian National Congress (I)
1980 by-election	Dronamraju Satyanarayana	Indian National Congress (I)
1983	P. Appalanarasimham	Telugu Desam Party
1985	Alla Rama Chandra Rao	Telugu Desam Party
1989	Gudivada Gurunadha Rao	Indian National Congress
1994	M. Anjaneyulu	Communist Party of India
1999	P. G. V. R. Naidu	Telugu Desam Party
2004	Tippala Gurumurthy Reddy	Indian National Congress
2009	Panchakarla Ramesh Babu	Praja Rajyam Party
2014	Bandaru Satyanarayana Murthy	Telugu Desam Party
2019	Annamreddy Adeep Raj	YSR Congress Party
2024	Panchakarla Ramesh Babu	Janasena Party

== Election results ==
=== 2024 ===
2024 Andhra Pradesh Legislative Assembly election: Pendurthi
Party	Candidate	Votes	%	±%
JSP	Panchakarla Ramesh Babu	149,611	65.01	▲55.22
YSRCP	Annamreddy Adeep Raj	67,741	29.43	▼20.36
INC	Bhagat Piridi	4,224	1.84	▲0.90
NOTA	None of the Above	2,834	1.23	▼0.67
Majority		81,870	35.37	▲18.46
Turnout		2,30,144		
JSP gain from YSRCP		Swing		

=== 2019 ===
2019 Andhra Pradesh Legislative Assembly election: Pendurthi
Party	Candidate	Votes	%	±%
YSRCP	Annamreddy Adeep Raj	99,759	49.79	
TDP	Bandaru Satyanarayana Murthy	70,899	35.38	
JSP	Chintalapudi Venkataramaiah	19,626	9.79	
Majority		28,860	16.91	
Turnout				
YSRCP gain from TDP		Swing		

=== 2014 ===
2014 Andhra Pradesh Legislative Assembly election: Pendurthi
Party	Candidate	Votes	%	±%
TDP	Bandaru Satyanarayana Murthy	94,531	51.87	
YSRCP	Gandi babji	75,883	41.64	
Majority		18,648	10.23	
Turnout		182,248	78.26	+2.79
TDP gain from PRP		Swing		

=== 2009 ===
2009 Andhra Pradesh Legislative Assembly election: Pendurthi
Party	Candidate	Votes	%	±%
PRP	Panchakarla Ramesh Babu	51,700	32.99	
INC	Gandi Babji	48,428	30.91	
TDP	Bandaru Satyanarayana Murthy	43,461	27.74	
Majority		3,272	2.08	
Turnout		156,695	75.47	+16.68
PRP gain from INC		Swing		

=== 2004 ===
2004 Andhra Pradesh Legislative Assembly election: Pendurthi
Party	Candidate	Votes	%	±%
INC	Tippala Gurumurthy Reddy	132,609	52.60	+11.08
TDP	Gudivada Nagamani	114,459	45.40	−6.56
Majority		18,150	7.20	
Turnout		252,118	58.79	−1.18
INC gain from TDP		Swing		

=== 1999 ===
1999 Andhra Pradesh Legislative Assembly election: Pendurthi
Party	Candidate	Votes	%	±%
TDP	P. G. V. R. Naidu	117,411	52.0	
INC	Dronamraju Srinivasa Rao	93,822	41.5	▲5.2
CPI	M. Anjaneyulu (incumbent)	11,750	5.2	▼48.5
RMEP	Mamidi Somi Naidu	1,005	0.4	
Natural Law	Karri Chaya Devi	544	0.2	
BSP	Boni Satyam	487	0.2	▼2.3
Independent	Prsadamma Nunna Deva	374	0.2	
SS	Amarapini Srinivasa Rao	364	0.2	
Independent	Kaila Vidya Sagar	228	0.1	
Majority		23,589	10.1	▼7
Turnout		232,818	61.8	▼1.5
TDP gain from CPI		Swing		

=== 1994 ===
1994 Andhra Pradesh Legislative Assembly election: Pendurthi
Party	Candidate	Votes	%	±%
CPI	M. Anjaneyulu	95,408	53.7	
INC	Dronamraju Srinivasa Rao	64,421	36.3	▼17
BJP	P.V. Chalapathi Rao	10,063	5.7	
BSP	Pampana Arjunarao	4,414	2.5	▲1.9
Independent	P.R.S. Apprao	2,401	1.4	
Independent	Wesli Prameelababu	531	0.3	
National Students Party	Mamidi Sominaidu	493	0.3	0.0
Majority		30,987	17.1	▲8.5
Turnout		181,400	63.3	▼4.3
CPI gain from INC		Swing		

=== 1989 ===
1989 Andhra Pradesh Legislative Assembly election: Pendurthi
Party	Candidate	Votes	%	±%
INC	Gudivada Gurunadha Rao	83,380	53.3	▲8.3
TDP	Palla Simhachalam	69,477	44.5	▼9.2
Independent	Jagupalli Apparao	1,011	0.7	
BSP	Nattala Baburao	961	0.6	▲1.9
MCPI(S)	Sudarayya Patrudu Maji	602	0.4	
Independent	Bhogavilli Nageswararao	468	0.3	
Independent	Mamidi Sominaidu	418	0.3	0.0
Majority		13903	8.6	0.0
Turnout		161,539	67.6	▲5.4
INC gain from TDP		Swing		

=== 1985 ===
1985 Andhra Pradesh Legislative Assembly election: Pendurthi
Party	Candidate	Votes	%	±%
TDP	Alla Rama Chandra Rao	56,498	53.7	▼7.1
INC	Gudivada Gurunadha Rao	47,289	45.0	▲22.7
Independent	G. K. Prasad	825	0.8	
Independent	Manidi Somu Naidu	362	0.3	▲0.1
Independent	N. R. K. Raju	154	0.2	
Majority		9,209	8.6	▼28.8
Turnout		107,088	62.2	▲0.7
TDP hold		Swing		

=== 1983 ===
1983 Andhra Pradesh Legislative Assembly election: Pendurthi
Party	Candidate	Votes	%	±%
TDP	Pethakamsetti Appala Narasimham	51,019	60.8	
INC	Dronamraju Satyanarayana (incumbent)	18,736	22.3	▼10.7
CPI(M)	Gangadhara Reddi Sabbilla	10,342	12.3	▼3
BJP	Appalaramiah Kadiala	2,135	2.5	
Independent	Kolusu China Apparao	511	0.6	
Independent	Guntakala Narasimha Murthy	398	0.5	
Independent	Nakkana Apparao	323	0.4	
Independent	Muthy Yelangisatyanarayana	299	0.4	
Independent	Mamidi Somunaidy	194	0.2	
Majority		32,283	37.4	▲29.72
Turnout		86,382	61.5	
TDP gain from INC(I)		Swing		

=== 1980 By-Election ===
1980 Pendurthi By-Election
Party	Candidate	Votes	%	±%
INC(I)	Dronamraju Satyanarayana	23,687	33	▼8.5
Independent	Palla Simhachalam	18,1725	25.32	▼9.2
CPI(M)	Gangadhara Reddi Sabbilla	10,981	15.3	▼11.7
CPI	P.Sanyasirao	7,755	10.8	▼13.1
Independent	S.Mummana	7,383	10.29	
JP	Y.Tatatikonda	3,079	4.29	
Independent	S.Apparao	723	1.01	
Majority		5,515	7.68	▼6.12
Turnout		71,780		
INC(I) hold		Swing		

=== 1978 ===
1978 Andhra Pradesh Legislative Assembly election: Pendurthi
Party	Candidate	Votes	%	±%
INC(I)	Gudivada Appanna	28,895	41.5	
CPI(M)	Gangadhara Reddi Sabbella	18,848	27	
CPI	Pothina Sanyasi Rao	16,678	23.9	
Independent	Gurumurthy Reddy Gorusu	2,998	4.3	
Independent	Suryanarayana Jeenapati	968	1.4	
Independent	Kotni Satyanarayana	769	1.1	
Independent	Bonu Lakshmana Rao	558	0.8	
Majority		10,047	13.8	
Turnout		72,547	70.9	
INC(I) win (new seat)				

== See also ==
- List of constituencies of the Andhra Pradesh Legislative Assembly
