= List of constituencies of the Andhra Pradesh Legislative Assembly =

List of state assembly constituencies in India

Andhra Pradesh Legislative Assembly
- 16th Andhra Pradesh Assembly

Type
- Type: Lower house of the Andhra Pradesh Legislature
- Term limits: 5 years

History
- Founded: 3 December 1956 (69 years ago)
- Seats: 175

Elections
- Voting system: First past the post
- Last election: May 2024

Meeting place
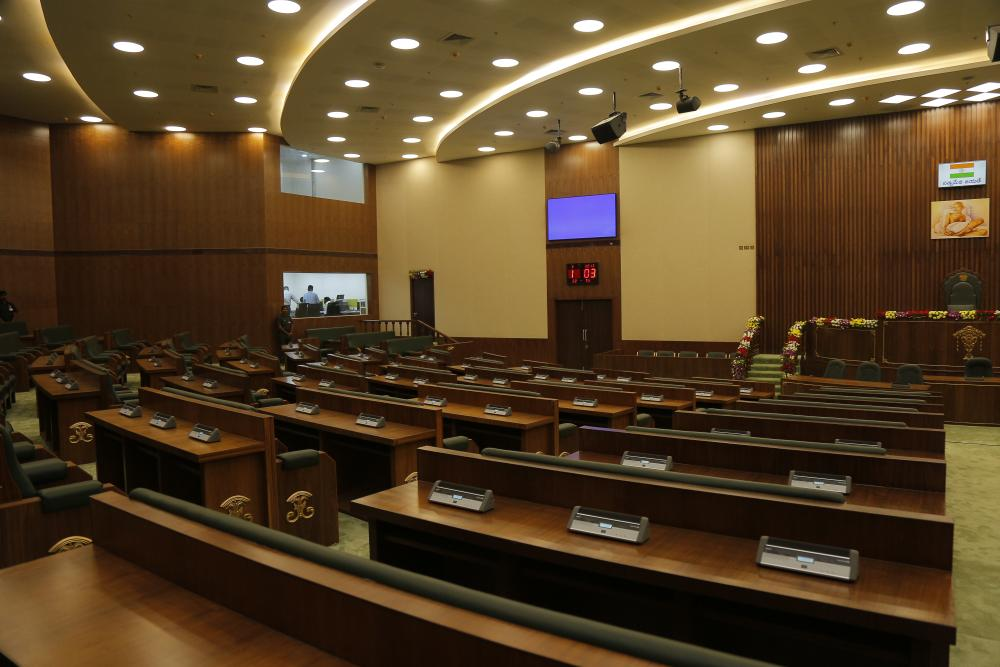
- Assembly Chamber, Amaravati, Andhra Pradesh

Website
- www.aplegislature.org

Location of Andhra Pradesh (in red) within India

The Andhra Pradesh Legislative Assembly is the lower house of the bicameral legislature of the state of Andhra Pradesh in South India. Its seat is at Amaravati, the capital of the state, and it sits for a term of five years unless it is dissolved early. (Note: A Legislative Assembly can be dissolved early, under Article 174 of the Indian Constitution, in a few situations including a hung assembly and the inability of any alliance to form a majority.) Andhra Pradesh is India's tenth largest state by population as well as the seventh largest by area. (Note: According to the 2011 Census of India, Andhra Pradesh was the fifth-largest state by population and the fourth-largest state by area., but after the 2014 carving out of Telangana (35m population and 112,077 km^{2} (43,273 sq mi) area), the residual state became the tenth largest state by population, and the seventh largest by area.) The Andhra Pradesh Legislative Assembly has had 16 terms since its creation. After the latest election in 2024, the assembly is governed by the Telugu Desam Party (TDP), which has 135 out of the 175 seats. The largest opposition party, YSR Congress Party (YSRCP), has 21 seats. (Note: The Janasena Party has more seats than the YSRCP, but they are allied with the TDP.)

Constituency boundaries are periodically redrawn by the delimitation commission, which tries to keep them as geographically compact areas, and with due consideration to existing boundaries of administrative units. The latest census is used to draw the boundaries and every assembly constituency has to be completely within a parliamentary constituency. Since 2014, the Andhra Pradesh Assembly has had 175 single-seat constituencies, each of which directly elects a representative based on a first past the post election.

Since the independence of India from the United Kingdom in 1947, the Scheduled Castes (SC) and Scheduled Tribes (ST) have been given reservation status, guaranteeing political representation, and the Constitution lays down the general principles of positive discrimination for SCs and STs. According to the 2011 census of India, the Scheduled Castes and the Scheduled Tribes constitute 16.4% and 7% of the population of the state, respectively. The Scheduled Castes have been granted a reservation of 29 seats in the assembly, while 7 constituencies are reserved for candidates of the Scheduled Tribes. (Note: These figures are after the bifurcation of the State. Before the bifurcation, Andhra Pradesh had 294 constituencies, of which 48 were reserved for the Scheduled Castes and 19 were reserved for the Scheduled Tribes.)

== History ==
Changes in the constituencies of the Andhra Pradesh Legislative Assembly over time
Year	Act	Effect	Total seats	Reserved seats		Election(s)
Year	Act	Effect	Total seats	SC	ST	Election(s)
1953	Andhra State Act, 1953	The new Andhra State was formed by splitting Madras State.	167	0	0	1955
1956	States Reorganisation Act, 1956	The new state of Andhra Pradesh was formed by the merger of Andhra State with the Telugu-speaking areas of Hyderabad State. In 1957 elections were only held in the newly-added regions.	252	18	2	1957
1961	Delimitation of Parliamentary and Assembly Constituencies Order, 1961	There were changes in the number and reservation status of constituencies. Two-member constituencies were abolished.	300	43	11	1962
1964	Delimitation Commission Order, 1964	There were changes in the number and reservation status of constituencies.	287	40	11	1967, 1972
1976	Delimitation of Parliamentary and Assembly Constituencies Order, 1976	There were changes in the number and reservation status of constituencies.	294	39	15	1978, 1983, 1985, 1989, 1994, 1999, 2004
2008	Delimitation Commission Order, 2008	There were changes in the reservation status and area covered by constituencies.	294	48	19	2009, 2014
2014	Andhra Pradesh Reorganisation Act, 2014	The new state of Telangana was created from 10 districts of Andhra Pradesh.	175	29	7	2019, 2024

== Constituencies ==
Assembly constituencies of Andhra Pradesh

Reservation
Scheduled Castes (SC)
Scheduled Tribes (ST)

Constituencies of the Andhra Pradesh Legislative Assembly
No.	Name	Reservation	District (Note: Districts as per the 2011 census)	Lok Sabha constituency	Electorate (2024)
1	Ichchapuram	None	Srikakulam	Srikakulam	270,180
2	Palasa	None	Srikakulam	Srikakulam	222,378
3	Tekkali	None	Srikakulam	Srikakulam	239,246
4	Pathapatnam	None	Srikakulam	Srikakulam	227,167
5	Srikakulam	None	Srikakulam	Srikakulam	274,523
6	Amadalavalasa	None	Srikakulam	Srikakulam	196,098
7	Etcherla	None	Srikakulam	Vizianagaram	245,696
8	Narasannapeta	None	Srikakulam	Srikakulam	217,094
9	Rajam	SC	Vizianagaram	Vizianagaram	228,390
10	Palakonda	ST	Parvathipuram Manyam	Araku	195,673
11	Kurupam	ST	Parvathipuram Manyam	Araku	194,616
12	Parvathipuram	SC	Parvathipuram Manyam	Araku	190,512
13	Salur	ST	Parvathipuram Manyam	Araku	204,874
14	Bobbili	None	Vizianagaram	Vizianagaram	232,170
15	Cheepurupalli	None	Vizianagaram	Vizianagaram	205,918
16	Gajapathinagaram	None	Vizianagaram	Vizianagaram	206,510
17	Nellimarla	None	Vizianagaram	Vizianagaram	214,550
18	Vizianagaram	None	Vizianagaram	Vizianagaram	257,760
19	Srungavarapukota	None	Vizianagaram	Visakhapatnam	223,353
20	Bhimili	None	Visakhapatnam	Visakhapatnam	364,304
21	Visakhapatnam East	None	Visakhapatnam	Visakhapatnam	292,444
22	Visakhapatnam South	None	Visakhapatnam	Visakhapatnam	216,970
23	Visakhapatnam North	None	Visakhapatnam	Visakhapatnam	286,016
24	Visakhapatnam West	None	Visakhapatnam	Visakhapatnam	213,912
25	Gajuwaka	None	Visakhapatnam	Visakhapatnam	334,399
26	Chodavaram	None	Anakapalli	Anakapalli	218,095
27	Madugula	None	Anakapalli	Anakapalli	189,560
28	Araku Valley	ST	Alluri Sitharama Raju	Araku	245,623
29	Paderu	ST	Alluri Sitharama Raju	Araku	248,473
30	Anakapalle	None	Anakapalli	Anakapalli	214,759
31	Pendurthi	None	Anakapalli	Anakapalli	308,024
32	Elamanchili	None	Anakapalli	Anakapalli	207,380
33	Payakaraopet	SC	Anakapalli	Anakapalli	251,185
34	Narsipatnam	None	Anakapalli	Anakapalli	212,362
35	Tuni	None	Kakinada	Kakinada	224,702
36	Prathipadu	None	Kakinada	Kakinada	217,339
37	Pithapuram	None	Kakinada	Kakinada	236,551
38	Kakinada Rural	None	Kakinada	Kakinada	269,453
39	Peddapuram	None	Kakinada	Kakinada	215,222
40	Anaparthy	None	East Godavari	Rajahmundry	226,103
41	Kakinada City	None	Kakinada	Kakinada	241,697
42	Ramachandrapuram	None	Konaseema	Amalapuram	203,341
43	Mummidivaram	None	Konaseema	Amalapuram	245,471
44	Amalapuram	SC	Konaseema	Amalapuram	213,630
45	Razole	SC	Konaseema	Amalapuram	198,010
46	Gannavaram	SC	Konaseema	Amalapuram	198,739
47	Kothapeta	None	Konaseema	Amalapuram	252,475
48	Mandapeta	None	Konaseema	Amalapuram	220,563
49	Rajanagaram	None	East Godavari	Rajahmundry	216,559
50	Rajahmundry City	None	East Godavari	Rajahmundry	267,591
51	Rajahmundry Rural	None	East Godavari	Rajahmundry	272,942
52	Jaggampeta	None	Kakinada	Kakinada	229,957
53	Rampachodavaram	ST	Polavaram	Araku	277,382
54	Kovvur	SC	East Godavari	Rajahmundry	184,245
55	Nidadavole	None	East Godavari	Rajahmundry	213,559
56	Achanta	None	West Godavari	Narasapuram	180,110
57	Palakollu	None	West Godavari	Narasapuram	195,146
58	Narasapuram	None	West Godavari	Narasapuram	170,521
59	Bhimavaram	None	West Godavari	Narasapuram	253,201
60	Undi	None	West Godavari	Narasapuram	224,831
61	Tanuku	None	West Godavari	Narasapuram	234,677
62	Tadepalligudem	None	West Godavari	Narasapuram	215,325
63	Unguturu	None	Eluru	Eluru	206,634
64	Denduluru	None	Eluru	Eluru	224,114
65	Eluru	None	Eluru	Eluru	235,464
66	Gopalapuram	SC	East Godavari	Rajahmundry	242,853
67	Polavaram	ST	Eluru	Eluru	254,047
68	Chintalapudi	SC	Eluru	Eluru	273,141
69	Tiruvuru	SC	NTR	Vijayawada	207,239
70	Nuzvid	None	Eluru	Eluru	239,034
71	Gannavaram	None	Krishna	Machilipatnam	279,127
72	Gudivada	None	Krishna	Machilipatnam	204,361
73	Kaikalur	None	Eluru	Eluru	205,682
74	Pedana	None	Krishna	Machilipatnam	167,622
75	Machilipatnam	None	Krishna	Machilipatnam	196,765
76	Avanigadda	None	Krishna	Machilipatnam	212,455
77	Pamarru	SC	Krishna	Machilipatnam	184,716
78	Penamaluru	None	Krishna	Machilipatnam	294,999
79	Vijayawada West	None	NTR	Vijayawada	256,021
80	Vijayawada Central	None	NTR	Vijayawada	277,796
81	Vijayawada East	None	NTR	Vijayawada	270,694
82	Mylavaram	None	NTR	Vijayawada	281,783
83	Nandigama	SC	NTR	Vijayawada	205,521
84	Jaggayyapeta	None	NTR	Vijayawada	205,415
85	Pedakurapadu	None	Palnadu	Narasaraopet	232,604
86	Tadikonda	SC	Guntur	Guntur	207,832
87	Mangalagiri	None	Guntur	Guntur	292,568
88	Ponnuru	None	Guntur	Guntur	227,648
89	Vemuru	SC	Bapatla	Bapatla	198,038
90	Repalle	None	Bapatla	Bapatla	229,005
91	Tenali	None	Guntur	Guntur	267,914
92	Bapatla	None	Bapatla	Bapatla	192,192
93	Prathipadu	SC	Guntur	Guntur	268,252
94	Guntur West	None	Guntur	Guntur	278,320
95	Guntur East	None	Guntur	Guntur	250,790
96	Chilakaluripet	None	Palnadu	Narasaraopet	226,867
97	Narasaraopet	None	Palnadu	Narasaraopet	232,951
98	Sattenapalle	None	Palnadu	Narasaraopet	242,328
99	Vinukonda	None	Palnadu	Narasaraopet	264,770
100	Gurajala	None	Palnadu	Narasaraopet	274,124
101	Macherla	None	Palnadu	Narasaraopet	262,518
102	Yerragondapalem	SC	Markapuram	Ongole	207,435
103	Darsi	None	Prakasam	Ongole	226,590
104	Parchur	None	Bapatla	Bapatla	229,821
105	Addanki	None	Prakasam	Bapatla	244,190
106	Chirala	None	Bapatla	Bapatla	203,136
107	Santhanuthalapadu	SC	Prakasam	Bapatla	214,795
108	Ongole	None	Prakasam	Ongole	240,385
109	Kandukur	None	Prakasam	Nellore	228,979
110	Kondapi	SC	Prakasam	Ongole	239,702
111	Markapuram	None	Markapuram	Ongole	215,024
112	Giddalur	None	Markapuram	Ongole	245,114
113	Kanigiri	None	Markapuram	Ongole	240,275
114	Kavali	None	Nellore	Nellore	238,645
115	Atmakur	None	Nellore	Nellore	215,460
116	Kovur	None	Nellore	Nellore	267,403
117	Nellore City	None	Nellore	Nellore	239,544
118	Nellore Rural	None	Nellore	Nellore	280,948
119	Sarvepalli	None	Nellore	Tirupati	232,034
120	Gudur	SC	Nellore	Tirupati	245,241
121	Sullurpeta	SC	Tirupati	Tirupati	242,704
122	Venkatagiri	None	Tirupati	Tirupati	243,637
123	Udayagiri	None	Nellore	Nellore	241,861
124	Badvel	SC	YSR Kadapa	Kadapa	220,220
125	Rajampet	None	YSR Kadapa	Rajampet	241,363
126	Kadapa	None	YSR Kadapa	Kadapa	283,618
127	Kodur	SC	Tirupati	Rajampet	204,582
128	Rayachoti	None	Annamayya	Rajampet	255,424
129	Pulivendla	None	YSR Kadapa	Kadapa	230,061
130	Kamalapuram	None	YSR Kadapa	Kadapa	204,387
131	Jammalamadugu	None	YSR Kadapa	Kadapa	242,826
132	Proddatur	None	YSR Kadapa	Kadapa	248,103
133	Mydukur	None	YSR Kadapa	Kadapa	212,134
134	Allagadda	None	Nandyal	Nandyal	233,237
135	Srisailam	None	Nandyal	Nandyal	196,596
136	Nandikotkur	SC	Nandyal	Nandyal	218,370
137	Kurnool	None	Kurnool	Kurnool	274,557
138	Panyam	None	Nandyal	Nandyal	332,012
139	Nandyal	None	Nandyal	Nandyal	274,446
140	Banaganapalle	None	Nandyal	Nandyal	241,695
141	Dhone	None	Nandyal	Nandyal	227,835
142	Pattikonda	None	Kurnool	Kurnool	224,049
143	Kodumur	SC	Kurnool	Kurnool	246,800
144	Yemmiganur	None	Kurnool	Kurnool	247,940
145	Mantralayam	None	Kurnool	Kurnool	208,407
146	Adoni	None	Kurnool	Kurnool	263,169
147	Alur	None	Kurnool	Kurnool	259,269
148	Rayadurg	None	Ananthapuramu	Anantapur	264,418
149	Uravakonda	None	Ananthapuramu	Anantapur	224,574
150	Guntakal	None	Ananthapuramu	Anantapur	271,057
151	Tadipatri	None	Ananthapuramu	Anantapur	249,103
152	Singanamala	SC	Ananthapuramu	Anantapur	247,803
153	Anantapur Urban	None	Ananthapuramu	Anantapur	281,403
154	Kalyandurg	None	Ananthapuramu	Anantapur	230,906
155	Raptadu	None	Ananthapuramu	Hindupur	250,979
156	Madakasira	SC	Sri Sathya Sai	Hindupur	210,883
157	Hindupur	None	Sri Sathya Sai	Hindupur	249,261
158	Penukonda	None	Sri Sathya Sai	Hindupur	236,189
159	Puttaparthi	None	Sri Sathya Sai	Hindupur	211,519
160	Dharmavaram	None	Sri Sathya Sai	Hindupur	246,016
161	Kadiri	None	Sri Sathya Sai	Hindupur	253,682
162	Thamballapalle	None	Annamayya	Rajampet	224,978
163	Pileru	None	Annamayya	Rajampet	235,014
164	Madanapalle	None	Annamayya	Rajampet	266,768
165	Punganur	None	Annamayya	Rajampet	239,256
166	Chandragiri	None	Tirupati	Chittoor	315,558
167	Tirupati	None	Tirupati	Tirupati	302,596
168	Srikalahasti	None	Tirupati	Tirupati	248,633
169	Sathyavedu	SC	Tirupati	Tirupati	215,473
170	Nagari	None	Chittoor	Chittoor	202,713
171	Gangadhara Nellore	SC	Chittoor	Chittoor	205,424
172	Chittoor	None	Chittoor	Chittoor	203,712
173	Puthalapattu	SC	Chittoor	Chittoor	222,074
174	Palamaner	None	Chittoor	Chittoor	268,135
175	Kuppam	None	Chittoor	Chittoor	225,977

== See also ==
- List of constituencies of the Telangana Legislative Assembly
- Lok Sabha constituencies of Andhra Pradesh
