= Warisan Furniture =

Furniture manufacturer of Indonesia

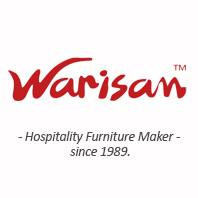
- Industry: Hospitality Furniture, Indoor & Outdoor, Teak Furniture
- Founded: 1989
- Headquarters: Denpasar, Bali, Indonesia
- Products: Furniture
- Number of employees: 450
- Website: warisan.com

Warisan Furniture is an Indonesian manufacturer specialised in contract indoor or outdoor furniture for the Hospitality & Residential sector. Headquartered in Bali, the company has been founded by 2 Italians.

== History ==
Based in Bali, Indonesia the Italian founders Gianpaolo Nogara and Lucio Brissolese established Warisan in 1989. First as purveyors of antiques, they progressively created a modern teak and mahogany furniture manufacturer for boutique hotels, resorts and private residences.

== Structure ==
Manufactured in East java & Bali, Warisan employs over 450 people (including approximately 400 in Indonesia). Warisan uses solid plantation hardwoods from Perum Perhutani (Indonesian government owned and maintained plantations) certificates available. while being able to work with other raw material such as mindi wood, stones, seashells, coconut, bamboo, rattan, and polyrattan.
