= Joginapally Santosh Kumar =

Indian politician

Santhosh Kumar
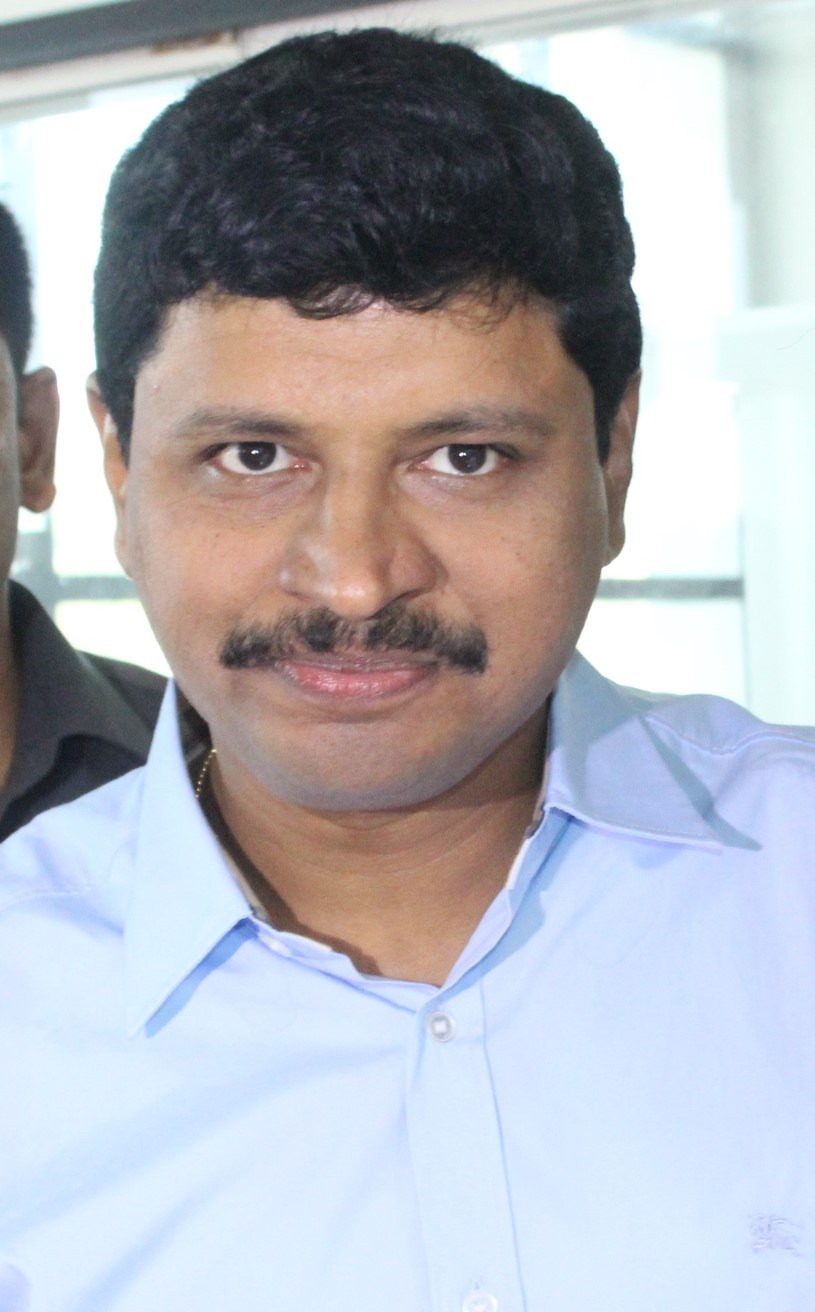

Member of Parliament Rajya Sabha
- In office 3 April 2018 – 2 April 2024
- Preceded by: C. M. Ramesh, TDP
- Succeeded by: M. Anil Kumar Yadav
- Constituency: Telangana

Personal details
- Born: 7 December 1976 (age 49) Kodurupaka, Boinapally Mandal, Karimnagar district, India
- Party: Bharat Rashtra Samithi

Joginapally Santhosh Kumar (born 7 December 1976) is a political leader from the Bharat Rashtra Samithi and previously served as a Member of Parliament, Rajya Sabha representing Telangana. He is the Managing Director of Telugu media house, Namasthe Telangana in Telangana, India. He is presently serving as General Secretary of Bharat Rashtra Samithi.

== Early life ==
He was born in Kodurupaka village in Boinpally mandal, Karimnagar, Telangana to Ravinder Rao and Shashikala. He moved to Hyderabad for doing his Intermediate and Degree after finishing tenth Standard in his native village. He completed his MBA in HR from Pune University. He is the nephew of Former Chief Minister of Telangana, Kalvakuntla Chandrashekhar Rao’s co-brother.

== Career ==
He joined BRS upon the advice from KCR before the inception of the BRS Party in 2008. He worked as a personal assistant to KCR ever since. He looked after party affairs from the beginning. He became Executive Director of T-news in 2012 and is presently the Managing Director of Namasthe Telangana.

He is presently looking after day-to-day activities of BRS party and is personal secretary of K. Chandrashekhar Rao.

He is running for Rajya Sabha to take care of important party affairs in Delhi.

== Personal life ==
He is married to Rohini. They have two sons, Ishaan and Shreyaan.
