= Annamreddy Adeep Raj =

Indian politician (born 1985)

Member of Legislative Assembly, Andhra Pradesh
- In office 2019–2024
- Preceded by: Bandaru Satyanarayana Murthy
- Succeeded by: Panchakarla Ramesh Babu
- Constituency: Pendurthi

Personal details
- Political party: YSR Congress Party

Annamreddy Adeep Raj (born 22 February 1985) is an Indian politician from Andhra Pradesh. He served as a member of the Andhra Pradesh Legislative Assembly from 2019 to 2024.

== Early life and education ==
Raj hails from Chakalaveedhi, Rampuram mandal, Visakhapatnam. His father is Satyanarayana. He completed schooling from Zilla Parishad High School, Adivivaram. He did his intermediate (plus two) from Gayatri Vidya Parishad College. He is a businessman. He married Sirisha and has a son, Satya Dhanvith Raj.

== Career ==
Raj started his political journey in 2006 when he was unanimously elected as the sarpanch of Rampuram village. In 2019, he was elected as MLA on YSRCP ticket from Pendurthi. Before joining YSRCP in 2019, he was the president of the Visakhapatnam Youth Congress.

He won the 2019 Andhra Pradesh Legislative Assembly election from Pendurthi Assembly Constituency in Visakhapatnam district on YSR Congress Party ticket. He is a first time MLA, who won against senior TDP leader and former minister Bandaru Satyanarayana Murthy by a margin of 28,860 votes.

Despite some factions in the party opposing his candidature, YSR Congress Party has confirmed his name to contest the Pendurthi Assembly Constituency for the 2024 election. The Pendurthi constituency has a reputation not to elect the same candidate twice. And he did not win. He lost the 2024 Andhra Pradesh Legislative Assembly election to Panchakarla Ramesh Babu of Janasena Party, by a margin of 81,870 votes.
