= Penmetsa Vishnu Kumar Raju =

Indian politician

Member of Andhra Pradesh Legislative Assembly
- Incumbent
- Assumed office 4 June 2024
- Preceded by: Ganta Srinivasa Rao
- Constituency: Visakhapatnam North
- In office 16 May 2014 – 23 May 2019
- Preceded by: Vijaya Kumar Thynala
- Succeeded by: Ganta Srinivasa Rao
- Constituency: Visakhapatnam North

Personal details
- Party: Bharatiya Janata Party
- Spouse: Penmetsa Sita Sujatha
- Parent: P. Satyanarayana Raju (father)
- Education: Bachelor of Engineering
- Profession: Business

Penmetsa Vishnu Kumar Raju is an Indian politician from Bharatiya Janata Party, Andhra Pradesh. He had won the 2024 Andhra Pradesh Legislative Assembly election from Visakhapatnam North. He has earlier represented Visakhapatnam North from 2014-2019 and worked as BJP's floor leader in Andhra Pradesh Legislative Assembly.

Penmetsa Vishnu Kumar Raju was actually from Kapavaram Village in West Godavari district. His family had migrated to Visakhapatnam in the 1970s. Vishnu was a state ranker in his school at VT College, Vizag and Topper in Civil Engineering from Andhra University and a Gold Medalist from Andhra University.
