= Ganta Srinivasa Rao =

Indian politician

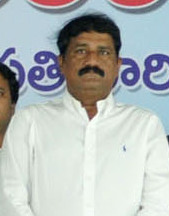

Minister for Human Resources Development Government of Andhra Pradesh
- In office 2014–2019
- Governor: E. S. L. Narasimhan
- Chief Minister: N. Chandrababu Naidu
- Preceded by: Sake Sailajanath
- Succeeded by: Audimulapu Suresh

Minister for Infrastructure Government of Andhra Pradesh
- In office 2012–2014
- Governor: E. S. L. Narasimhan
- Chief Minister: Nallari Kiran Kumar Reddy
- Preceded by: Komatireddy Venkat Reddy
- Succeeded by: Office Dissolved

Member of Andhra Pradesh Legislative Assembly
- Incumbent
- Assumed office 2024
- Preceded by: Muttamsetti Srinivasa Rao
- Constituency: Bheemili
- In office 2019–2024
- Preceded by: Penmetsa Vishnu Kumar Raju
- Succeeded by: Penmetsa Vishnu Kumar Raju
- Constituency: Visakhapatnam North
- In office 2014–2019
- Preceded by: Muttamsetti Srinivasa Rao
- Succeeded by: Muttamsetti Srinivasa Rao
- Constituency: Bheemili
- In office 2009–2014
- Preceded by: Konathala Ramakrishna
- Succeeded by: Peela Govinda Satyanarayana
- Constituency: Anakapalle
- In office 2004–2009
- Preceded by: Balireddy Satya Rao
- Succeeded by: Kalidindi Suryana Naga Sanyasi Raju
- Constituency: Chodavaram

Member of Parliament, Lok Sabha
- In office 11 October 1999 – 11 May 2004
- Preceded by: Gudivada Gurunadha Rao
- Succeeded by: Pappala Chalapathirao
- Constituency: Anakapalli, Andhra Pradesh

Personal details
- Born: 1 December 1960 (age 65); Kamepalli village, Prakasam district, Andhra Pradesh, India
- Party: Telugu Desam Party (1999-2008) (2014-present)
- Other party: Indian National Congress (2011-2014); Praja Rajyam Party (2008-2011)

Ganta Srinivasa Rao is an Indian politician from Telugu Desam Party and member of Andhra Pradesh Legislative Assembly currently representing Bheemili constituency from 4 June 2024. He served as the minister of Human Resources Development of Andhra Pradesh in India. He hails from Kamepalli village in Prakasam district.

== Career ==
He is the MLA of TDP in the Andhra Pradesh Legislative Assembly from Bhimili Assembly Constituency. He was elected as MLA from Chodavaram in 2004 on Telugu Desam Party party ticket, Anakapalle in 2009 on Praja Rajyam Party ticket, Bhimili Assembly Constituency in 2014 on Telugu Desam Party party ticket, and Visakhapatnam North in 2019 on Telugu Desam Party party ticket. He was also elected as MP from Anakapalli Lok Sabha constituency in 1999.

He started his political journey with Telugu Desam Party and joined Praja Rajyam Party. He is a close associate of Chiranjeevi. He also worked as Minister in N. Kiran Kumar Reddy cabinet after Praja Rajyam Party merged into Indian National Congress.

== Election Statistics ==
	Year	Contested For	Party	Constituency	Votes Polled	Opponent	Party	Votes Polled	Margin	RESULT
1	1999	MP	Telugu Desam Party	Anakapalle	3,92,984	Gurunadha Rao Gudivada	Indian National Congress	3,34,520	58,464	Won
2	2004	MLA	Telugu Desam Party	Chodavaram	63,250	Balireddy Satya Rao	Indian National Congress	53,649	9,601	Won
3	2009	MLA	Praja Rajyam Party	Anakapalle	58,568	Konathala Ramakrishna	Indian National Congress	47,702	10,866	Won
4	2014	MLA	Telugu Desam Party	Bheemili	1,18,020	Karri Sita Ramu	YSR Congress Party	80,794	37,226	Won
5	2019	MLA	Telugu Desam Party	Visakhapatnam North	67,352	Kammula Kannaparaju	YSR Congress Party	65,408	1,944	Won
6	2024	MLA	Telugu Desam Party	Bheemili	1,76,230	Muttamsetti Srinivasa Rao	YSR Congress Party	83,829	92,401	Won
