= S.Rayavaram =

- Village
- Interactive map of S.Rayavaram
- Location in Andhra Pradesh, India S.Rayavaram (India)
- Coordinates: 17°27′16.40″N 82°48′22.16″E
- Country: India
- State: Andhra Pradesh
- District: Anakapalli

Languages
  - Official: Telugu
- Time zone: UTC+5:30 (IST)
- PIN: 531060
- Vehicle Registration: AP31 (Former); AP39 (from 30 January 2019)

S. Rayavaram (Sarvasiddhi Rayavaram) is a village in Anakapalli district in the state of Andhra Pradesh in India. It is the birthplace of Sri Gurajada Apparao, the playwright, poet and social reformer in the Telugu language.

== Notable people ==
- Gurajada Apparao
- Beesetti Venkata Satyavathi
