= Gudivada Amarnath =

Indian politician

Minister of Information Technology, Electronics and Communications Government of Andhra Pradesh
- In office 11 April 2022 – 4 June 2024
- Governor: Biswabhusan Harichandan; S. Abdul Nazeer
- Chief Minister: Y. S. Jagan Mohan Reddy
- Preceded by: Mekapati Goutham Reddy
- Succeeded by: Nara Lokesh

Minister of Industries and Commerce; Infrastructure and Investment Government of Andhra Pradesh
- In office 11 April 2022 – 4 June 2024
- Governor: Biswabhusan Harichandan; S. Abdul Nazeer
- Chief Minister: Y. S. Jagan Mohan Reddy
- Preceded by: Buggana Rajendranath
- Succeeded by: T. G. Bharath (as Minister of Industries and Commerce); B. C. Janardhan Reddy (as Minister of Infrastructure and Investment)

Member of Legislative Assembly, Andhra Pradesh
- In office 2019–2024
- Preceded by: Peela Govinda Satyanarayana
- Succeeded by: Konathala Ramakrishna
- Constituency: Anakapalle

Personal details
- Born: 1985 or 1986 (age 40–41)
- Party: YSR Congress Party (2014–present)
- Other political affiliations: Indian National Congress; Telugu Desam Party (until 2014)
- Spouse: Hima Gowri
- Parents: Gudivada Gurunadha Rao (father); Gudivada Nagamani (mother)
- Occupation: Politician

Gudivada Amarnath (born 1985 or 1986) is an Indian politician from the state of Andhra Pradesh. He is elected as the Member of the Legislative Assembly (MLA) from Anakapalle Assembly constituency in 2019 to the Andhra Pradesh Legislative Assembly representing the YSR Congress Party.

== Early life ==
Gudivada Amarnath was born to Gudivada Gurunadha Rao, (a former politician and Member of Legislative Assembly from Penduthi Assembly Constituency from Visakhapatnam District in Andhra Pradesh. Served as State Minister of Education in 1994 Member of Parliament in 1998 from Anakapalli Lok Sabha constituency), and Nagamani. He graduated with an engineering degree.

== Career ==
Gudivada Amarnath and his Mother, Nagamani, were members of Indian National Congress. They quit Congress and joined Telugu Desam Party (TDP) after the death of his father. In March 2014, they both quit TDP and joined YSR Congress Party.
