= Dadi Veerabhadra Rao =

Indian politician (born 1950)

Member of Legislative Assembly Andhra Pradesh
- In office 1985–2004
- Preceded by: Raja Kanna Babu
- Succeeded by: Konathala Ramakrishna
- Constituency: Anakapalli

Member of Legislative Council Andhra Pradesh
- In office 2007–2013

Leader of Opposition in Legislative Council Andhra Pradesh
- In office 2007–2013

Personal details
- Party: Telugu Desam Party (until 2013; since 2024)
- Other political affiliations: YSR Congress Party (2013–2014; 2019–2024)

Dadi Veerabhadra Rao (born 1950) is an Indian politician from Andhra Pradesh. He is a four-time MLA from Anakapalli constituency in Visakhapatnam district. He served as a minister of Information & Public Relations in NTR's second, third and fourth ministry and was the leader of the opposition in Andhra Pradesh Legislative Council for six years.

== Early life and education ==
Rao hails from Anakapalli and was born to late Dadi Jagga Rao. He completed his M.Com. at AMAL College, Anakapalli. He belongs to the Gavara community.

== Political career ==
Rao first won the 1985 Andhra Pradesh Legislative Assembly election from Anakapalli constituency in the then Visakhapatnam district on Telugu Desam Party ticket and went on to win the next three elections in 1989, 1994 and 1999. He lost to Konathala Ramakrishna of Indian National Congress in 2004 Assembly election. He also lost the next elections in 2009 but became an MLC in 2007. In May 2013, he quit Telugu Desam Party and joined YSRCP before the assembly elections in 2014 but rejoined TDP after the elections. Again, in March 2019, he joined YSR Congress Party but did not contest any election and became a star campaigner. However, he returned to TDP once again after quitting YSRCP in January 2024. In March 2024, he vowed to support his long-time political rival Konathala Ramakrishna who is contesting the Anakapalli MLA seat.

Rao established the Dadi Institute of Engineering and Technology College in 2006.
