= Avanthi Srinivas =

Indian politician

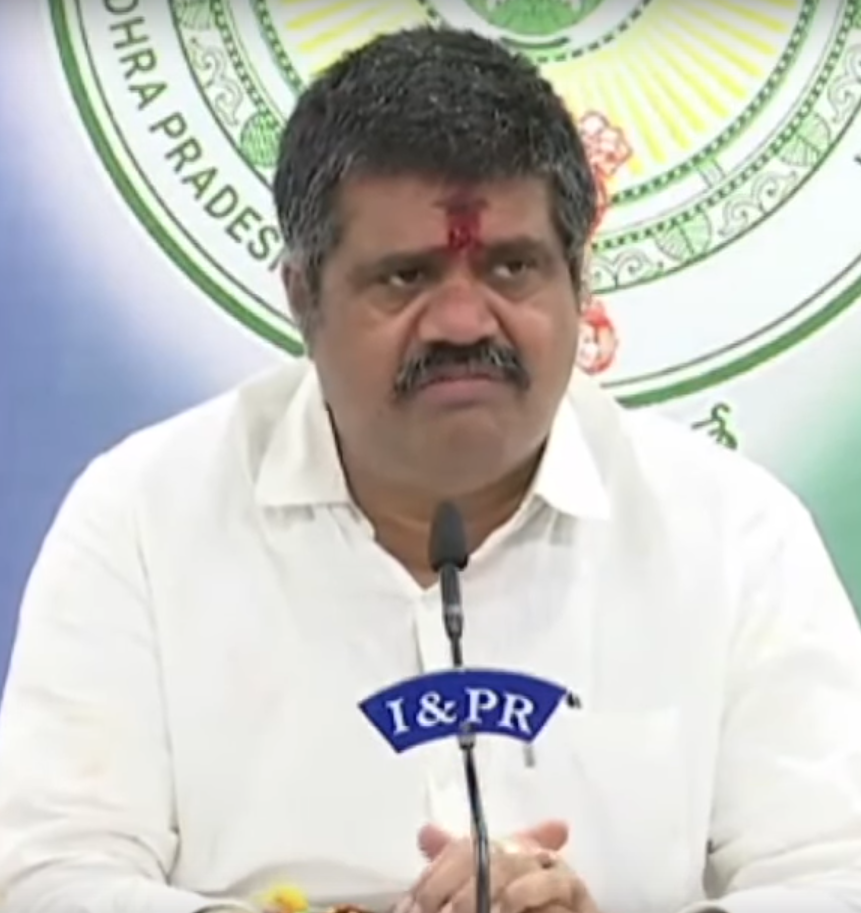

Ex. Minister for Tourism, Culture and Youth Advancement Government of Andhra Pradesh
- In office 8 June 2019 – 7 April 2022
- Governor: E. S. L. Narasimhan; Biswabhusan Harichandan
- Chief Minister: Y. S. Jagan Mohan Reddy
- Preceded by: Bhuma Akhila Priya
- Succeeded by: RK Roja

Member of Parliament, Lok Sabha
- In office 2014–2019
- Preceded by: Sabbam Hari
- Succeeded by: Beesetti Venkata Satyavathi
- Constituency: Anakapalli

Member of Legislative Assembly Andhra Pradesh
- In office 2019–2024
- Preceded by: Ganta Srinivasa Rao
- Succeeded by: Ganta Srinivasa Rao
- Constituency: Bheemili
- In office 2009–2014
- Preceded by: Karri Seetharamu
- Succeeded by: Ganta Srinivasa Rao
- Constituency: Bheemili

Personal details
- Born: 12 June 1967 (age 58) Eluru, West Godavari district, Andhra Pradesh, India
- Other political affiliations: YSR Congress Party (2019–2024); Telugu Desam Party (2014–2019); Indian National Congress (2012–2014); Praja Rajyam Party (2009–2012)
- Spouse: M. Gnaneswari
- Children: 1 daughter, 1 son
- Occupation: Politician, educationalist
- Website: www.avanthisrinivasarao.com

Muttamsetti Srinivasa Rao, popularly known as Avanthi Srinivas, is an Indian educationalist turned politician. He is the Ex. Member of the Legislative Assembly from Bheemili, Andhra Pradesh. He operates Avanthi Education Institutes in Andhra Pradesh and Telangana under Avanthi Educational Society, Visakhapatnam. In May 2014, he was elected to the 16th Lok Sabha.

== Personal life ==
He was born in Eluru on 12 June 1967 to Muttamsetti Venkata Narayana and Smt. Muttamsetti Nageswaramma. He married Smt. M. Gnaneswari on 20 June 1986 and has two children – one daughter: Priyanka, one son: Nandish.

=== Political career ===
He was a member of the Andhra Pradesh Legislative Assembly between 2009 and 2014. In May 2014, he was elected to 16th Lok Sabha. At the Lok Sabha, he was the member of the Rules Committee; Standing Committee on Industry and the Consultative Committee, Ministry of Human Resource Development.

On 14 February 2019, he quit the TDP to join the YSRCP.

He was elected in Bheemili constituency as member of legislative assembly for the second time in the 2019 elections. He had also won in the same constituency in the 2009. He was appointed Minister for Tourism, Culture and Youth Advancement of Andhra Pradesh. Srinivas was dropped from State Cabinet in the reshuffle in April 2022.

He resigned to YSRCP on 12 December 2024.

=== Assembly elections 2019 ===
2019 Andhra Pradesh Legislative Assembly election: Bhimili
Party	Candidate	Votes	%	±%
YSRCP	Muttamsetti Srinivasa Rao	101629	44.21	+9.63
TDP	Sabbam Hari	91917	39.98	−0.99
JSP	Panchakarla Sandeep	24248	10.55	+10.55
Majority		9712	9.63	
Turnout		217794	94.74	
