= Anakapalle Assembly constituency =

Constituency of the Andhra Pradesh Legislative Assembly, India

Coordinates: 17.69°N 83.00°E

Anakapalle
- Constituency No. 30 for the Andhra Pradesh Legislative Assembly
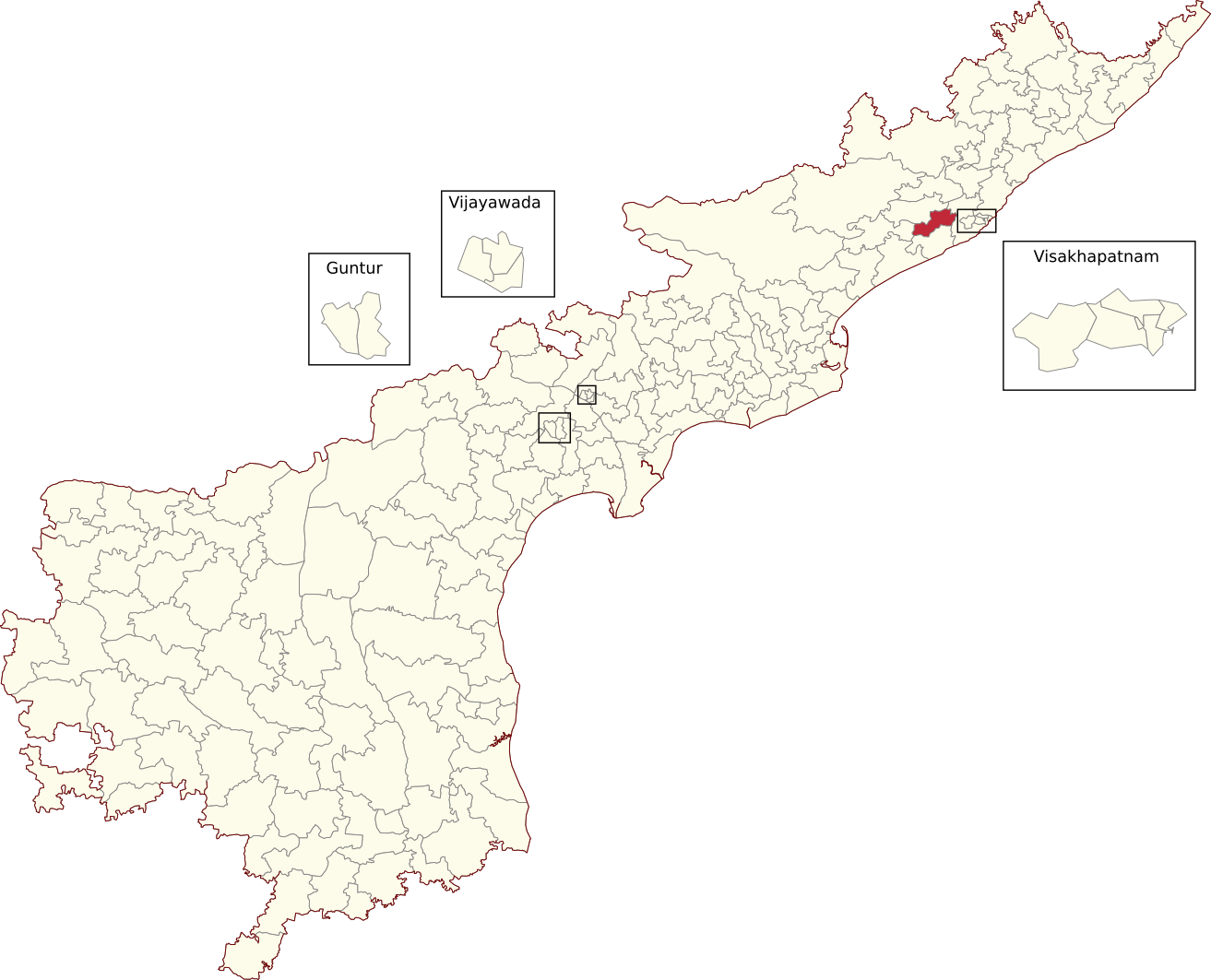
- Location of Anakapalli Assembly constituency within Andhra Pradesh

Constituency details
- Country: India
- Region: South India
- State: Andhra Pradesh
- District: Anakapalli
- Lok Sabha constituency: Anakapalle
- Established: 1951
- Total electors: 204,699
- Reservation: None

Member of Legislative Assembly
- 16th Andhra Pradesh Legislative Assembly
- Incumbent Konathala Ramakrishna
- Party: JSP
- Alliance: NDA
- Elected year: 2024

Anakapalle Assembly constituency is a constituency in Anakapalli district of Andhra Pradesh that elects representatives to the Andhra Pradesh Legislative Assembly in India. It is one of the seven assembly segments of Anakapalle Lok Sabha constituency.

Konathala Ramakrishna is the current MLA of the constituency, having won the 2024 Andhra Pradesh Legislative Assembly election from Janasena Party. As of 2019, there are a total of 204,699 electors in the constituency. The constituency was established in 1951, as per the Delimitation Orders (1951).

== Mandals ==
The two mandals that form the assembly constituency are:

- Anakapalle
- Kasimkota

== Members of the Legislative Assembly ==
| Year | Member | Political party |
|---|---|---|
| 1952 | Koduganti Govinda Rao | Communist Party of India |
| 1955 | Beesetti Appa Rao | Krishikar Lok Party |
| 1962 | Koduganti Govinda Rao | Communist Party of India |
| 1967 | Koduganti Govinda Rao | Communist Party of India |
| 1972 | Pentakota Venkata Ramana | Indian National Congress |
| 1978 | Koduganti Govinda Rao | Communist Party of India |
| 1983 | Raja Kanna Babu | Telugu Desam Party |
| 1985 | Dadi Veerabhadra Rao | Telugu Desam Party |
| 1989 | Dadi Veerabhadra Rao | Telugu Desam Party |
| 1994 | Dadi Veerabhadra Rao | Telugu Desam Party |
| 1999 | Dadi Veerabhadra Rao | Telugu Desam Party |
| 2004 | Konathala Ramakrishna | Indian National Congress |
| 2009 | Ganta Srinivasa Rao | Praja Rajyam Party |
| 2014 | Peela Govinda Satyanarayana | Telugu Desam Party |
| 2019 | Gudivada Amarnath | YSR Congress Party |
| 2024 | Konathala Ramakrishna | Janasena Party |

== Election results ==
=== 1952 ===
1952 Madras Legislative Assembly election: Anakapalli
| Party | Candidate | Votes | % | ±% |
|---|---|---|---|---|
| CPI | Koduganti Govinda Rao | 18,505 | 41.42% | |
| KLP | Villuri Venkataramana | 11,886 | 26.61% | |
| INC | Boddeda Atchannaiudu | 9,797 | 21.93% | 21.93% |
| Independent | Talupala Venkatarao Nauyudu | 4,485 | 10.04% | |
| Margin of victory | | 6,619 | 14.82% | |
| Turnout | | 44,673 | 59.84% | |
| Registered electors | | 74,650 | | |
| CPI win (new seat) | | | | |

=== 1955 ===
1955 Andhra State Legislative Assembly election: Anakapalli
| Party | Candidate | Votes | % | ±% |
|---|---|---|---|---|
| KLP | Beesetti Appa Rao | 19,957 | 49.96 | ▲23.35 |
| CPI | Koduganti Govinda Rao (Incumbent) | 19,304 | 48.33 | ▲6.91 |
| Independent | Pentakota Adinarayana Naidu | 684 | 1.71 | |
| Majority | | 653 | 1.63 | ▼13.19 |
| Turnout | | 39,945 | 66.11 | ▲6.27 |
| KLP gain from Communist Party Of India | | Swing | | |

=== 1962 ===
1962 Andhra Pradesh Legislative Assembly election: Anakapalli
| Party | Candidate | Votes | % | ±% |
|---|---|---|---|---|
| CPI | Koduganti Govindarao | 23,523 | 66.62 | ▲18.29 |
| INC | Budha Apparao Naidu | 11,786 | 33.37 | |
| Majority | | 11,737 | 33.25 1.63 | ▲31.62 |
| Turnout | | 35,309 | | |
| Communist Party Of India gain from KLP | | Swing | | |

=== 1967 ===
1967 Andhra Pradesh Legislative Assembly election: Anakapalli
| Party | Candidate | Votes | % | ±% |
|---|---|---|---|---|
| CPI | Koduganti Govindarao | 20,539 | 39.59 | ▼27.03 |
| SWA | B. V. Naidu | 12,249 | 23.61 | |
| Independent | M. R. Raju | 7,456 | 14.37 | |
| INC | A. Beesetti | 5,541 | 10.68 | ▼22.69 |
| ABJS | J. C. Guruvulu | 1,271 | 1.9 | |
| CPI(M) | K. R. Rao | 2,430 | 4.68 | |
| Majority | | 8,290 | 15.98 | ▼17.27 |
| Turnout | | 51,881 | 73.39 | |
| Communist Party Of India hold | | Swing | | |

=== 1972 ===
1972 Andhra Pradesh Legislative Assembly election: Anakapalli
| Party | Candidate | Votes | % | ±% |
|---|---|---|---|---|
| INC | Pentakota Venkata Ramana | 29,053 | 51.33 | ▲40.65 |
| CPI | Koduganti Govindarao | 22,160 | 39.15 | ▼0.44 |
| ABJS | P. V. Chalaprahi Rao | 4,058 | 7.17 | ▲0.1 |
| Independent | Peela Appla Naidu | 1,331 | 2.35 | |
| Majority | | 6,893 | 12.18 | ▲0.2 |
| Turnout | | 56,602 | 66.03 | ▼7.36 |
| INC gain from Communist Party Of India | | Swing | | |

=== 1978 ===
1978 Andhra Pradesh Legislative Assembly election: Anakapalli
| Party | Candidate | Votes | % | ±% |
|---|---|---|---|---|
| CPI | Koduganti Govindarao | 28,382 | 41.7 | ▲2.55 |
| JP | P. V. Chalapitarao | 19,945 | 29.3 | |
| Independent | Majji Prasadrao | 15,149 | 22.3 | |
| Independent | Duvvda Venkatrao | 3,285 | 4.8 | |
| RPI(K) | J. C. Guruvulu | 1,271 | 1.9 | |
| Majority | | 8,437 | 12.1 | ▼0.08 |
| Turnout | | 70,006 | 75.1 | ▲9.07 |
| Communist Party Of India gain from INC | | Swing | | |

=== 1983 ===
1983 Andhra Pradesh Legislative Assembly election: Anakapalli
| Party | Candidate | Votes | % | ±% |
|---|---|---|---|---|
| TDP | Raja Kanna Babu | 40,767 | 61.0 | |
| INC | Malla Lakshminaravana | 15,383 | 23.0 | |
| CPI | Koduganti Govindarao (incumbent) | 6,203 | 9.3 | ▼32.4 |
| BJP | Yarramsetti Satyarao | 4,029 | 6.0 | |
| Independent | Kotni Kannayya Dora | 414 | 0.6 | |
| Majority | | 25,384 | 37.1 | ▲25 |
| Turnout | | 68,366 | 69.6 | ▼5.5 |
| TDP gain from Communist Party Of India | | Swing | | |

=== 1985 ===
1985 Andhra Pradesh Legislative Assembly election: Anakapalli
| Party | Candidate | Votes | % | ±% |
|---|---|---|---|---|
| TDP | Dadi Veerabhadra Rao | 51,083 | 70.3% | ▲9.3 |
| INC | Nimmadala Satyanarayana | 21,542 | 29.7 | ▲6.7 |
| Majority | | 29,541 | 39.8 | ▲2.7 |
| Turnout | | 74,306 | 68.7 | ▼0.9 |

=== 1989 ===
1989 Andhra Pradesh Legislative Assembly election: Anakapalli
| Party | Candidate | Votes | % | ±% |
|---|---|---|---|---|
| TDP | Dadi Veerabhadra Rao | 46,287 | 50.8 | ▼19.5 |
| INC | Dantuluri Dileep Kumar | 44,029 | 48.3 | ▲18.6 |
| BSP | Kandregula Sarveswara Rao | 876 | 1.0 | |
| Majority | | 2,258 | 2.4 | ▼37.4 |
| Turnout | | 94,240 | 75.7 | ▲7 |
| TDP hold | | Swing | | |

=== 1994 ===
1994 Andhra Pradesh Legislative Assembly election: Anakapalli
| Party | Candidate | Votes | % | ±% |
|---|---|---|---|---|
| TDP | Dadi Veerabhadra Rao | 45,577 | 45.0 | ▼5.8 |
| Independent | Dantuluri Dilip Kumar | 43,966 | 43.4 | ▼4.9 |
| INC | Venkata Jaggarao Peela | 9,883 | 9.8 | ▼38.5 |
| BJP | Elugula Venkatarao | 1,093 | 1.1 | |
| BSP | Karri Venkunaidu | 302 | 0.3 | ▼0.7 |
| Jharkhand Party | Gonthina Satyarao | 288 | 0.3 | |
| Independent | Buddha Varaha Satyanarayana | 86 | 0.1 | |
| Independent | Valisetty Sankararao | 82 | 0.1 | |
| Majority | | 1,611 | 1.6 | ▼0.8 |
| Turnout | | 102,823 | 75.9 | ▲0.2 |
| TDP hold | | Swing | | |

=== 1999 ===
1999 Andhra Pradesh Legislative Assembly election: Anakapalli
| Party | Candidate | Votes | % | ±% |
|---|---|---|---|---|
| TDP | Dadi Veerabhadra Rao | 52,570 | 50.04% | 5.04% |
| INC | Konathala Ramakrishna | 49039 | 46.52% | 46.42% |
| Majority | | 3711 | 3.72% | |
| Turnout | | 105417 | 72.19% | |

=== 2004 ===
2004 Andhra Pradesh Legislative Assembly election: Anakapalli
| Party | Candidate | Votes | % | ±% |
|---|---|---|---|---|
| INC | Konathala Ramakrishna | 63,277 | 56.97 | +10.45 |
| TDP | Dadi Veerabhadra Rao | 46,244 | 41.64 | −8.40 |
| Majority | | 17,033 | 15.33 | |
| Turnout | | 111,061 | 74.80 | +4.29 |
| INC gain from TDP | | Swing | | |

=== 2009 ===
2009 Andhra Pradesh Legislative Assembly election: Anakapalli
| Party | Candidate | Votes | % | ±% |
|---|---|---|---|---|
| PRP | Ganta Srinivasa Rao | 58,568 | 40.79 | |
| INC | Konathala Ramakrishna | 47,702 | 33.22 | −23.75 |
| TDP | Dadi Veerabhadra Rao | 28,528 | 19.87 | −21.77 |
| Majority | | 10,866 | 7.57 | |
| Turnout | | 143,588 | 78.54 | +3.74 |
| PRP gain from INC | | Swing | | |

=== 2014 ===
2014 Andhra Pradesh Legislative Assembly election: Anakapalli
| Party | Candidate | Votes | % | ±% |
|---|---|---|---|---|
| TDP | Peela Govinda Satyanarayana | 79,911 | 53.33 | |
| YSRCP | Raghunath Konathala | 57,570 | 38.42 | |
| Majority | | 22,341 | 14.91 | |
| Turnout | | 149,837 | 78.91 | +0.37 |
| TDP gain from PRP | | Swing | | |

=== 2019 ===
2019 Andhra Pradesh Legislative Assembly election: Anakapalli
| Party | Candidate | Votes | % | ±% |
|---|---|---|---|---|
| YSRCP | Gudivada Amarnath | 73,207 | 45.97 | |
| TDP | Peela Govinda Satyanarayana | 65,038 | 40.84 | |
| JSP | Paruchuri Bhaskara Rao | 12,988 | 7.53 | |
| Majority | | 8,169 | | |
| Turnout | | | | |
| YSRCP gain from TDP | | Swing | | |

=== 2024 ===
2024 Andhra Pradesh Legislative Assembly election: Anakapalli
| Party | Candidate | Votes | % | ±% |
|---|---|---|---|---|
| JSP | Konathala Ramakrishna | 115,126 | 66.63 | |
| YSRCP | Malasala Bharath Kumar | 49,362 | 28.57 | |
| INC | Illa Rama Gangadhara Rao | 1895 | 1.1 | |
| NOTA | None Of The Above | 1853 | 1.07 | |
| Majority | | 65,764 | | |
| Turnout | | 172,778 | | |
| JSP gain from YSRCP | | Swing | | |

== See also ==
- List of constituencies of the Andhra Pradesh Legislative Assembly
