= C. M. Ramesh =

Indian politician

Member of Parliament, Lok Sabha
- Incumbent
- Assumed office 04 June 2024
- Preceded by: Beesetti Venkata Satyavathi
- Constituency: Anakapalle

Member of Parliament, Rajya Sabha
- In office 3 April 2018 – 3 April 2024
- Preceded by: Tulla Devender Goud
- Succeeded by: Golla Baburao
- Constituency: Andhra Pradesh
- In office 3 April 2012 – 2 April 2018
- Succeeded by: Joginapally Santosh Kumar
- Constituency: Telangana

Personal details
- Born: Potladurthi Village, Kadapa Dist
- Party: Bharatiya Janata Party
- Other political affiliations: Telugu Desam Party (until 2019)
- Spouse: Sridevi
- Children: 2

Chintakunta Munuswamy Ramesh is an Indian politician from Bharatiya Janata Party and businessman.

He was a Public accounts committee member from BJP and also Member of Parliament (Rajya Sabha) from Andhra Pradesh. He won his second consecutive Rajya Sabha term in 2018. C. M. Ramesh belongs to the Velama community of Kadapa.

C. M. Ramesh contested and won the 2024 Elections from Anakapalli Lok Sabha Constituency and won with a margin of 2,96,530 votes.

C. M. Ramesh is the Founder Chairman of Rithwik Projects Pvt. Ltd., which was set up in 1999 and it has grown to a turnover of more than 1000 Crores within a span of 14 years. The company is one of the leading Infrastructure Developers in India and has interests in energy, roads, irrigation projects and property development.

== Hunger strike ==
C. M. Ramesh started a hunger strike on 20 June 2018, demanding Steel Plant in Kadapa which was part of the Andhra Pradesh Reorganization Act 2014. Former Tamil Nadu Chief Minister Karunanidhi's daughter Kanimozhi visited fasting camp on 26 June and extended support for the cause from her DMK party thereby garnering nationwide support for Andhra Pradesh in achieving its rights.

== Election results ==
=== 2024 ===
2024 Indian general elections: Anakapalli
| Party | Candidate | Votes | % | ±% |
|---|---|---|---|---|
| BJP | C. M. Ramesh | 762,069 | 57.50 | +56.43 |
| YSRCP | Budi Mutyala Naidu | 465,539 | 35.13 | −12.20 |
| INC | Vegi Venkatesh | 25,651 | 1.94 | |
| BSP | Palaka Sreerama Murthy | 19,157 | 1.45 | |
| Independent | Dr Hari Shankar Thummapala | 1567 | 0.2 | |
| NOTA | None of the above | 26,235 | 1.98 | |
| Majority | | 296,530 | 22.37 | +15.17 |
| Turnout | | 1,325,332 | | |
| BJP gain from YSRCP | | Swing | | |

== Rajya Sabha Election History ==
| Position | Party | Constituency | From | To | Tenure |
|---|---|---|---|---|---|
| Member of Parliament, Rajya Sabha (1st Term) | TDP | Andhra Pradesh | 3 April 2012 | 1 June 2014 | 2 years, 59 days |
| Member of Parliament, Rajya Sabha (2nd Term) | TDP | Telangana | 2 June 2014 | 27 March 2018 | 3 years, 298 days |
| Member of Parliament, Rajya Sabha (3rd Term) | BJP | Andhra Pradesh | 3 April 2018 | 2 April 2024 | 5 years, 365 days |

== See also ==
- Rajya Sabha members from Andhra Pradesh
- Rajya Sabha members from Telangana
