= S. R. A. S. Appala Naidu =

Indian politician

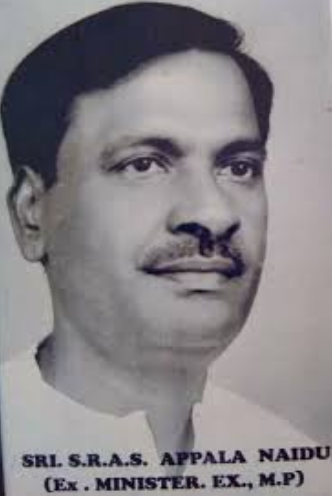
- SRA Appala Naidu, Former Minister, M.P, M.L.A

Member of the Legislative Assembly, Paravada
- In office 1967–1971
- Minister: Fisheries And Ports (1969-71)
- Preceded by: Eti Nagayya
- Constituency: Paravada

Member of Parliament, Lok Sabha
- In office 1971–1984
- Constituency: Anakapalle
- Preceded by: Missula Suryanarayana Murti
- Succeeded by: Pethakamsetti Appala Narasimham

Personal details
- Born: 6 November 1925 Pendurthi, Visakhapatnam, Andhra Pradesh
- Died: 1996 (aged 70–71)
- Party: Indian National Congress

S. R. A. S. Appala Naidu (6 November 1925 – 1996) was an Indian Member of Parliament in the Lok Sabha. His full name is Saragadam Rama Adhi Suri Appala Naidu.

== Early life ==
He was born in 1925 in Pendurthi, Visakhapatnam. He served as Gram Munisibhu four times between 1944 and 1964 and served as Gram Sarpanch between 1964 and 1967.

== Political career ==
He was Member of Andhra Pradesh Legislative Assembly between 1967 and 1969. He was elected from Parwada constituency as Indian National Congress candidate. He was Minister for Fisheries and Ports during 1969 - 71

He was elected to the 5th Lok Sabha (1971–77) 6th Lok Sabha (1977–80) and 7th Lok Sabha (1980–84) from Anakapalli (Lok Sabha constituency) as a candidate of Indian National Congress. He was also the chairman of Visakhapatnam Urban Development Authority (VUDA) in 1982–83.

== Memorial ==
A bronze statue was erected in his memory at the Pendurthi cross roads Visakhapatnam in the mid 1990s.

A bronze statue was erected in his memory at the Kasimkota ECB Visakhapatnam in 2016.
