= Visakhapatnam North Assembly constituency =

Constituency of the Andhra Pradesh Legislative Assembly, India

Coordinates: 17.72°N 83.25°E

Visakhapatnam North
- Constituency No. 23 for the Andhra Pradesh Legislative Assembly
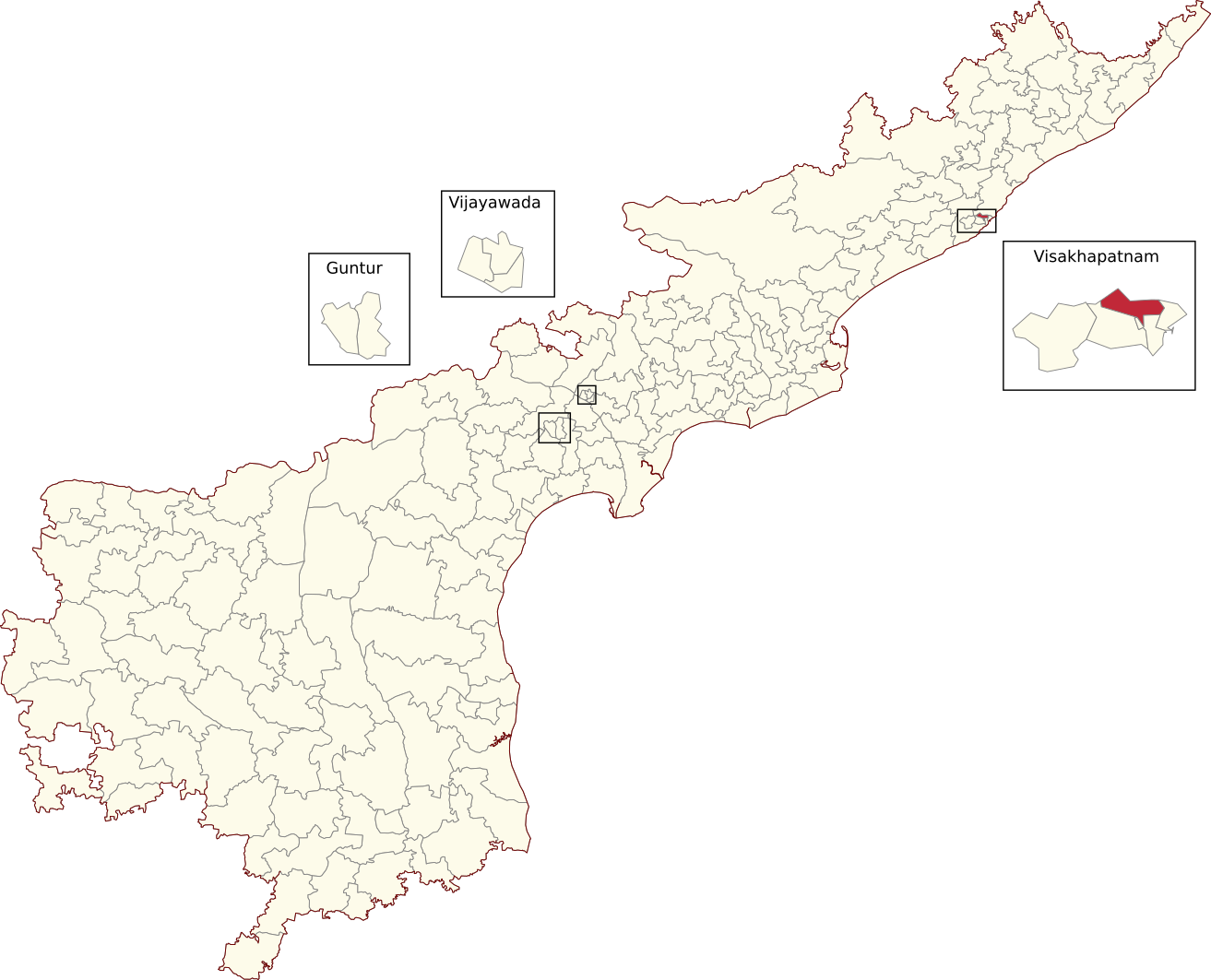
- Location of Visakhapatnam North Assembly constituency within Andhra Pradesh

Constituency details
- Country: India
- Region: South India
- State: Andhra Pradesh
- District: Visakhapatnam
- Lok Sabha constituency: Visakhapatnam
- Established: 2008
- Total electors: 280,151
- Reservation: None

Member of Legislative Assembly
- 16th Andhra Pradesh Legislative Assembly
- Incumbent Penmetsa Vishnu Kumar Raju
- Party: BJP
- Alliance: NDA
- Elected year: 2024

Visakhapatnam North is a constituency in Visakhapatnam district of Andhra Pradesh that elects representatives to the Andhra Pradesh Legislative Assembly in India. It is one of the seven assembly segments of Visakhapatnam Lok Sabha constituency.

Penmetsa Vishnu Kumar Raju is the current MLA of the constituency, having won the 2024 Andhra Pradesh Legislative Assembly election from Bharatiya Janata Party. As of 2019, there are a total of 280,151 electors in the constituency. The constituency was established in 2008, as per the Delimitation Orders (2008).

== Mandal ==
The mandal and wards that forms the assembly constituency are:

Mandal
Visakhapatnam (Urban) Mandal (Part) Visakhapatnam (M.Corp) Ward No. 36 to 41, 44 to 45 and 49 to 52

== Members of the Legislative Assembly ==
Year	Member	Political Party
Until 2008: Constituency did not exist
2009	Thynala Vijaya Kumar	Indian National Congress
2014	Penmetsa Vishnu Kumar Raju	Bharatiya Janata Party
2019	Ganta Srinivasa Rao	Telugu Desam Party
2024	Penmetsa Vishnu Kumar Raju	Bharatiya Janata Party

== Election results ==
Vote share of Winning candidates
2024	57.81%
2019	38.09%
2014	51.34%
2009	34.59%

=== 2024 ===
2024 Andhra Pradesh Legislative Assembly election: Visakhapatnam North
Party	Candidate	Votes	%	±%
BJP	Penmetsa Vishnu Kumar Raju	108,801	57.81	▲47.18
YSRCP	Kannaparaju Kammila	61,267	32.55	▼4.44
IND	Vaddi Sirisha	5,311	2.82	Steady
JBNP	V. V. Lakshmi Narayana	5,160	2.74	Steady
INC	Lakkaraju Rama Rao	4,252	2.26	▲1.10
NOTA	None of the Above	1,130	0.60	▼0.20
Majority		47,534	25.26	▲24.16
Turnout		188,208	65.80	
Swing to BJP from TDP		Swing		

=== 2019 ===
2019 Andhra Pradesh Legislative Assembly election: Visakhapatnam North
Party	Candidate	Votes	%	±%
TDP	Ganta Srinivasa Rao	67,352	38.09	New entry
YSRCP	Kammila Kannaparaju	65,408	36.99	▼2.94
JSP	Pasupuleti Usha Kiran	19,139	10.82	New entry
BJP	Penmetsa Vishnu Kumar Raju	18,790	10.63	▼40.71
INC	Gompa Govinda Raju	2,054	1.16	▼1.39
NOTA	None of the Above	1,411	0.80	▼0.10
IND	6 Independent Candidates	1,256	0.71	Steady
OTH	5 Other Party Candidates	1,431	0.81	Steady
Majority		1,944	1.10	▼10.31
Turnout		176,841	63.08	
Swing to TDP from BJP		Swing		

=== 2014 ===
2014 Andhra Pradesh Legislative Assembly election: Visakhapatnam North
Party	Candidate	Votes	%	±%
BJP	Penmetsa Vishnu Kumar Raju	82,079	51.34	▲48.33
YSRCP	Chokkakula Venkata Rao	63,839	39.93	New entry
LSP	Bhesetty Apparao Babji	4,847	3.03	New entry
INC	Gunturu Bharathi Venkateswari	4,072	2.55	▼32.04
NOTA	None of the Above	1,440	0.90	New entry
JSP	Gadu V. V. S. Kamalakara Rao	1,317	0.82	New entry
AAP	Shaik Nagoor	654	0.41	New entry
DBP (Note: Dalita Bahujana Party)	Banna Ramesh	388	0.24	▼0.21
IND	Engamuri Ramya	316	0.20	Steady
IND	Ommi Yellaji Rao Yadav	218	0.14	Steady
IND	Vijayakumar Nallabilli	198	0.12	Steady
IND	Selagamsetty Prasada Rao	187	0.12	Steady
IND	Kari Madhusudhana Rao	176	0.11	Steady
IND	Saripalli Demullu	131	0.08	Steady
Majority		18,240	11.41	▲7.54
Turnout		159,862	59.83	
Swing to BJP from INC		Swing		

=== 2009 ===
2009 Andhra Pradesh Legislative Assembly election: Visakhapatnam North
Party	Candidate	Votes	%	±%
INC	Vijaya Kumar Thynala	49,344	34.59	New entry
PRP	Dr. Shirin Rahman Shaik	43,821	30.72	New entry
TDP	Bharanikana Jaya	26,990	18.92	New entry
IND	Srinivas Mahesh	7,756	5.44	Steady
IND	Isukapalli Rama Krishna Raju	5,609	3.93	Steady
BJP	P. V. N. Madhav	4,299	3.01	New entry
IND	Tadi Manohar Kumar	851	0.60	Steady
RJD	Narem Venkata Rao	783	0.55	New entry
IND	Rajamundry Kameswari	667	0.47	Steady
IND	Sanapala M. M. M. Krishna	647	0.45	Steady
DBP	Banna Ramesh	638	0.45	New entry
PPOI (Note: Pyramid Party of India)	Satyavathi Boddeti	542	0.38	New entry
BSP	Anitha Vittanala	486	0.34	New entry
IND	Kona Srinu	210	0.15	Steady
Majority		5,523	3.87	New entry
Turnout		142,643		New entry
INC win (new seat)				

== See also ==
- List of constituencies of the Andhra Pradesh Legislative Assembly
