= Konathala Ramakrishna =

Indian politician

Minister of Commercial Taxes Government of Andhra Pradesh
- In office 14 May 2004 – 20 May 2009
- Governor: Surjit Singh Barnala; Sushilkumar Shinde; Rameshwar Thakur; N. D. Tiwari
- Chief Minister: Y. S. Rajasekhara Reddy
- Preceded by: Ashok Gajapathi Raju
- Succeeded by: Konijeti Rosaiah

Member of Legislative Assembly Andhra Pradesh
- Incumbent
- Assumed office 2024
- Preceded by: Gudivada Amarnath
- Constituency: Anakapalle
- In office 2004–2009
- Preceded by: Dadi Veerabhadra Rao
- Succeeded by: Ganta Srinivasa Rao
- Constituency: Anakapalle

Member of Parliament, Lok Sabha
- In office 1989–1996
- Preceded by: P. Appalanarasimham
- Succeeded by: Chintakayala Ayyanna Patrudu
- Constituency: Anakapalle

Personal details
- Born: 4 January 1957 (age 69) Anakapalli, Visakhapatnam, Andhra Pradesh (now Anakapalli district, Andhra Pradesh)
- Party: Jana Sena Party (2024-present)
- Other political affiliations: YSR Congress Party (2011-2014); Indian National Congress (1982-2011)
- Spouse: Konathala Padmavathi (m.1982)
- Children: 2 (daughters)
- Education: M.Com
- Alma mater: Andhra Vidhyalayam
- Profession: Politics; Businessman

Konathala Ramakrishna (born 4 January 1957) is an Indian politician from Andhra Pradesh. He is a two-time Member of Parliament from Anakapalle Lok Sabha constituency and also a former MLA from Anakapalli Assembly constituency and a state minister in the Y. S. Rajasekhar Reddy government before serving as Andhra Pradesh Congress parliament members convener from 1991 to 1996.

== Early life and education ==
Ramakrishna was born in Anakapalli in a business family of Gavara community. His father is Konathala Subramanyam.

== Career ==
Ramakrishna started his political career with Indian National Congress in 1982. In 1989, he contested as an MP candidate of Congress from Anakapalle Parliamentary constituency and won by a slender margin of 9 votes defeating Telugu Desam Party candidate P. Appalanarasimham. He retained the MP seat for Congress defeating the same candidate in 1991. However, he lost the same seat in the 1996 Indian general election in Andhra Pradesh.

He was a state minister in the Y. S. Rajasekhar Reddy government before serving as Andhra Pradesh Congress parliament members convener from 1991 to 1996.

In the 2004 Andhra Pradesh Legislative Assembly election, he won as a Congress candidate against Dadi Veerabhadra Rao of Telugu Desam Party. He was the Minister for Commercial Taxes in the late Y. S. Rajasekhar Reddy government from 2004 to 2009. In 2009, he lost the MLA seat to Ganta Srinivasa Rao of Praja Rajyam Party. After the death of former Chief Minister Y. S. Rajasekhar Reddy, he joined YSR Congress Party and supported Y. S. Jagan Mohan Reddy. But later, he quit the party. In June 2016, he staged a dharna to demand funds for the Babu Jagjeevanram Uttarandhra Sujala Sravanthi irrigation project.

He is nominated to contest the 2024 Andhra Pradesh Legislative Assembly election from Anakapalli constituency on Jana Sena Party which he joined in January 2024. Thus, he joined his long-time political rival Dadi Veerabhadra Rao in the three-party political alliance of Telugu Desam, BJP and Jana Sena, and vowed to defeat YSRCP. He said that they were only political rivals but always had good relationship outside politics. However, many TDP cadre were unhappy that a turncoat was given the seat.
