= Bheemili Assembly constituency =

Constituency of the Andhra Pradesh Legislative Assembly, India

Coordinates: 17.89°N 83.44°E

Bheemili
- Constituency No. 20 for the Andhra Pradesh Legislative Assembly
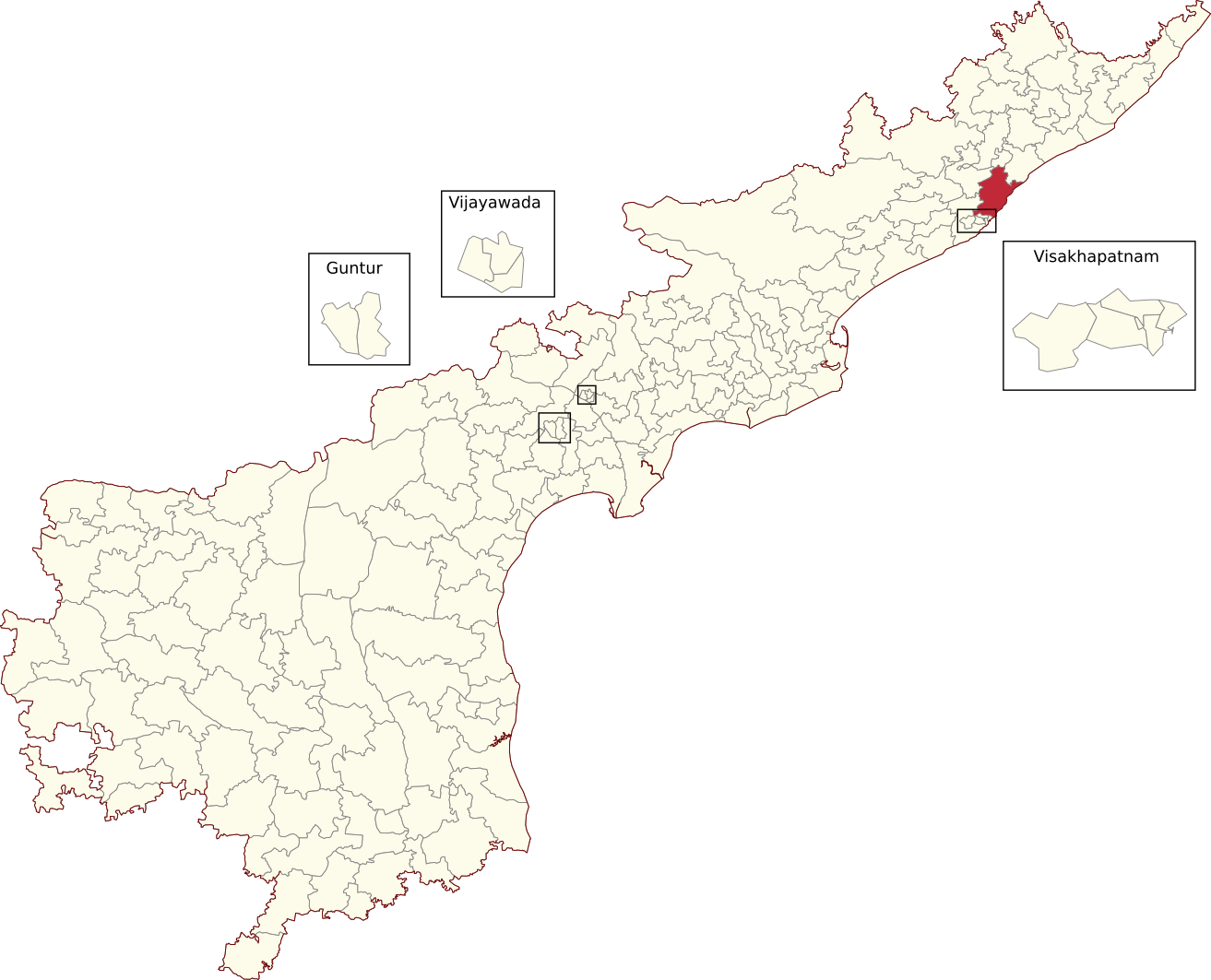
- Location of Bheemili Assembly constituency within Andhra Pradesh

Constituency details
- Country: India
- Region: South India
- State: Andhra Pradesh
- District: Visakhapatnam
- Lok Sabha constituency: Visakhapatnam
- Established: 2008
- Total electors: 363,013
- Reservation: None

Member of Legislative Assembly
- 16th Andhra Pradesh Legislative Assembly
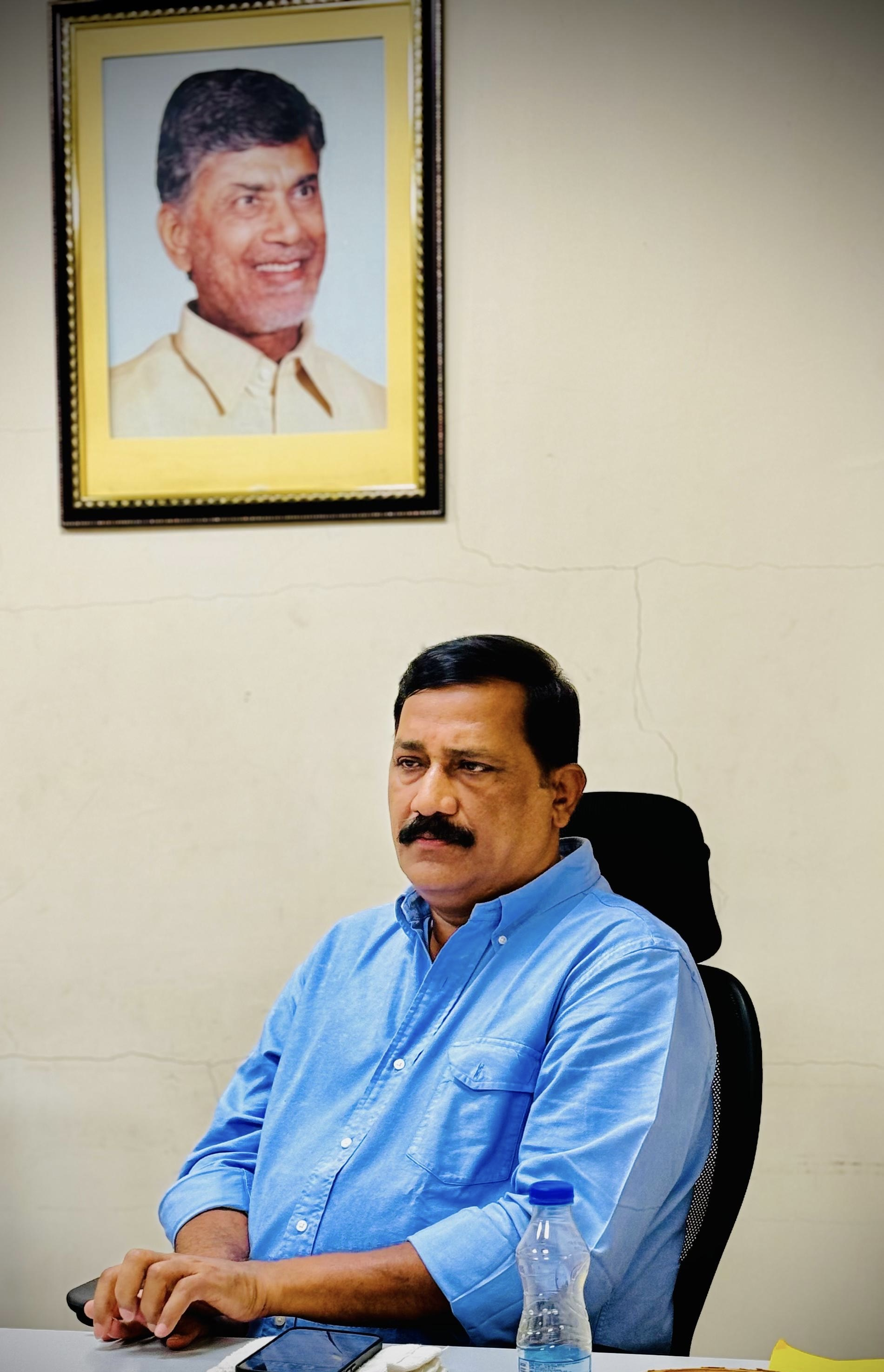
- Incumbent Ganta Srinivasa Rao
- Party: TDP
- Alliance: NDA
- Elected year: 2024

Bheemili Assembly constituency is a constituency in Visakhapatnam district of Andhra Pradesh that elects representatives to the Andhra Pradesh Legislative Assembly of Andhra Pradesh in India. It is one of the seven assembly segments of Visakhapatnam Lok Sabha constituency.

Ganta Srinivasa Rao is the current MLA of the constituency, having won the 2024 Andhra Pradesh Legislative Assembly election from Telugu Desam Party. As of 2019, there are a total of 305,958 electors in the constituency. The constituency was established in 2008, as per the Delimitation Orders (2008).

== Mandals ==
The four mandals that form the assembly constituency are:

Mandal
Bheemili
Anandapuram
Padmanabham
Visakhapatnam Rural part

Bheemili Assembly constituency

== Members of the Legislative Assembly ==
Year	Member	Political party
2009	Muttamsetti Srinivasa Rao	Praja Rajyam Party
2014	Ganta Srinivasa Rao	Telugu Desam Party
2019	Muttamsetti Srinivasa Rao	YSR Congress Party
2024	Ganta Srinivasa Rao	Telugu Desam Party

== Election results ==
=== 2009 ===
2009 Andhra Pradesh Legislative Assembly election: Bheemili
Party	Candidate	Votes	%	±%
PRP	Muttamsetti Srinivasa Rao	52,130	29.56	
TDP	Anjaneya Raju	45,820	25.98	
INC	P Uma Rani	41,219	23.37	
Majority		6,310	3.58	
Turnout		176,353	79.03	
PRP win (new seat)				

=== 2014 ===
2014 Andhra Pradesh Legislative Assembly election: Bheemili
Party	Candidate	Votes	%	±%
TDP	Ganta Srinivasa Rao	118,020	40.97	
YSRCP	Karri Sita Ramu	81,794	34.58	
Majority		37,226	17.78	
Turnout		211,826	75.31	−3.72
TDP gain from INC		Swing		

=== 2019 ===
2019 Andhra Pradesh Legislative Assembly election: Bheemili
Party	Candidate	Votes	%	±%
YSRCP	Muttamsetti Srinivasa Rao	101,629	44.21	+9.63
TDP	Sabbam Hari	91,917	39.98	−0.99
JSP	Panchakarla Naga Sandeep	24,248	10.55	+10.55
Majority		9,712	9.63	
Turnout		217,794	94.74	
YSRCP gain from TDP		Swing		

=== 2024 ===
2024 Andhra Pradesh Legislative Assembly election: Bheemili
Party	Candidate	Votes	%	±%
TDP	Ganta Srinivasa Rao	176,230	63.34	▲23.3
YSRCP	Muttamsetti Srinivasa Rao	83,829	30.13	▼14.08
INC	Addala Venkata Varma Raju	5,147	1.85	▲1.03
NOTA	None of the Above	3,061	1.10	
Majority		92,401	33.21	▲23.58
Turnout		2,78,235		
TDP gain from YSRCP		Swing		
