= Panchakarla Ramesh Babu =

Indian politician

Member of the Andhra Pradesh Legislative Assembly
- Incumbent
- Assumed office 2024
- Preceded by: Annamreddy Adeep Raj
- Constituency: Pendurthi
- In office 2014–2019
- Preceded by: Kanna Babu
- Succeeded by: Kanna Babu
- Constituency: Elamanchili
- In office 2009–2014
- Preceded by: Tippala Gurumurthy Reddy
- Succeeded by: Bandaru Satyanarayana Murthy
- Constituency: Pendurthi

Personal details
- Party: Jana Sena Party (since 2023)
- Other party: YSR Congress Party(2021–2023); Telugu Desam Party (2014–2021); Praja Rajyam Party (2009–2011); Indian National Congress (until 2014)
- Occupation: Politician

Panchakarla Ramesh Babu is an Indian politician from the Janasena Party and a member of Andhra Pradesh Legislative Assembly from Pendurthi. He is a former member of the Andhra Pradesh Legislative Assembly from Elamanchili constituency. He joined Janasena Party in July 2023. He was first elected as a MLA from Pendurthi Assembly constituency in Praja Rajyam Party in 2009. In 2014, he joined Telugu Desam Party followed by YSR Congress Party in 2021 and finally in 2023, he is in Janasena Party.
