= Pethakamsetti Appala Narasimham =

Indian politician

Pethakamsetti Appalanarasimham

Member of Legislative Assembly
- In office 1983–1984
- Preceded by: Gudivada Appanna
- Succeeded by: Alla Ramachandra Rao
- Constituency: Pendurthi

Member of Parliament
- In office 1984–1989
- Preceded by: SRAS Appalanaidu
- Succeeded by: Konathala Ramakrishna
- Constituency: Anakapalli

Chairman of Visakhapatnam Urban Development Authority
- In office 1984-1984
- Preceded by: SRAS Appalanaidu

Personal details
- Born: 1938 Nagulapalli, Visakhapatnam district
- Other political affiliations: Telugu Desam Party

Petakamsetti Appala Narasimham, also known as P. Appalanarasimham (1938–2009) was a member of the Indian Parliament.

== Life ==
Appalanarasimham was born in Nagulapalli village, Anakapally Taluk, Vishakhapatnam district in June, 1938.

He has moved out of Nagulapalli village and worked as a civil contractor and settled near the now Gopalapatnam area. He undertook contracts including the Simhachalam ghat road, first airport contract in Visakhapatnam along with his uncle Sadaram Appalnaidu after whom Naiduquarters and Naiduthota areas are named.

His son P.G.V.R. Naidu was also a Member of Legislative Assembly in Andhra pradesh.

His bronze statue was erected in his memory at the Diamond Park in Visakhapatnam in 2009.

== Political career ==
He was elected Samiti President independently and later joined NTR's party Telugu Desam. He was Member of Andhra Pradesh Legislative Assembly between 1983 and 1984. He was elected from Pendurthi constituency as an Independent candidate.

He was chairman of Visakhapatnam Urban Development Authority (VUDA) in 1984.

He was elected to the 8th Lok Sabha from Anakapalli (Lok Sabha constituency) as a candidate of Telugu Desam Party in 1984.
