= Kodurupaka =

- village
- Interactive map of Kodurupaka
- Country: India
- State: Telangana

Government
  - Body: Gram Panchayat

Population (2011)
  - Total: 5,738

Languages
  - Official: Telugu
- Time zone: UTC+5:30 (IST)

Kodurupaka is one of the oldest villages in the Karimnagar district of Telangana, India. It is 21km from Karimnagar, on the highway from Karimnagar to Peddapalli. There is a bus service to the town.

The actual place of interest is not exactly at the Kodurupaka Stage, but the entire village is concentrated deep inside, which is 2 km away from the main road.

== Environment ==
Agriculture is the primary source of income in this area and rice is the main crop. Drought was common in those days so the farmers had largely switched over to cotton and maize. The village is located on the banks of the Manair River. This was the major source of water for household consumption and for agricultural irrigation, but the river is runs dry in summer .

The village has much greenery. Palm Toddy trees provide a livelihood for many people, largely a group called the Gouds. Fresh Vegetables are much grown in this area. Karimnagar depot RTC runs daily bus services to collect the daily harvest at 4AM. We can reach this village from Sultanabad.

== Tourist attraction ==
Kodurupaka has different sunrise and sunset scenarios. People in this village experience Morning afternoon only because sunrises late and sets early in this village because it’s surrounded geographically by three hills. It became a tourist spot now because it's surrounded by hills on three sides

During the summer of 2019, Kodurupaka reported the temperature being 2C to 3C higher.
