= Missula Suryanarayana Murti =

Indian politician

M. S. Murti

Parliament (Lok Sabha MP)
- In office 13 years
- Constituency: Anakapalli

Personal details
- Born: 4 February 1911 Kondakarla, Visakhapatnam district
- Died: August 1973 (aged 62) KGH, Visakhapatnam
- Party: Indian National Congress
- Children: 6

Missula Suryanarayana Murti (4 February 1911 – August 1973) was an Indian politician and Member of Parliament.

== Early life ==
Murti was born to Shri Venkanna at Kondakarla in Brahmin family. He married on 29 May 1929. They had 6 children, 4 sons and 2 daughters.

== Career ==
Murthi graduated with a B.SC. in Chemistry and researched activated carbon from agricultural refuse and sugar technology while working at a sugar plant located near Anakapalli.

He was a member of Pradesh Congress Committee after 1945. He was president of Visakhapatnam District Congress Committee from 1942 to 1946 and from 1953 to 1957.

He was elected to the 2nd Lok Sabha from Golugonda Constituency in 1957 and the 3rd and 4th Lok Sabha from Anakapalli constituency in 1962 and 1967 as a member of Indian National Congress.

Though he was elected repeatedly, lifelong he lived in a hut in kondakarla. He sold most of his inheritance for the sake to serve the people residing in his constituency during the tenure he is in office.

Before entering into politics, he was the President of Kondakarla, Atchutapuaram Mandal.

He established development techniques including Harijan (outcaste) development and a cooperative society in his Kondakarla for educating deprived students.

Some of his Social activities are Organising co-operative Societies, Harijan uplift and rural welfare.
