= Beesetti Venkata Satyavathi =

Indian politician

Dr. Beesetti Venkata Satyavathi

Member of Parliament
- In office 23 May 2019 – 2024
- Preceded by: Muttamsetti Srinivasa Rao
- Succeeded by: C. M. Ramesh
- Constituency: Anakapalli

Personal details
- Born: 30 April 1966 (age 60) S.Rayavaram
- Party: YSR Congress Party
- Spouse: Kandregula Vishnumurthy
- Parent(s): Jagannadha Rao, Demullamma
- Education: Andhra Medical College
- Occupation: M.B.B.S, Gynecologist

Beesetti Venkata Satyavathi (born 30 April 1966) is an Indian politician from Andhra Pradesh. She was elected as a member of parliament to the 17th Lok Sabha from Anakapalli Lok Sabha constituency, Andhra Pradesh. She won the 2019 Indian general election representing YSR Congress Party.

== Early life ==
Satyavathi was born to Jagannadha Rao and Demullamma on 30 April 1966 at S.Rayavaram village in Anakapalle. She married Kandregula Vishnumurthy of Anakapalle who owns Vivekananda hospital. She has a son who is also a doctor.

== Education and social service ==
Satyavathi did M.B.B.S. in Gynecology from Andhra Medical College at Visakhapatnam. People used to call her by the name 'Satyavathamma' for her works towards poor people as she used to charge a mere Rs.30 fee. Earlier, she worked in Anakapalli Maternity hospital from 1993 to 1999 and did many normal deliveries. In the year 2000, she and her husband Vishnumurthy started Vivekananda hospital and started charging a nominal fee of Rs.10 per patient and also started a trust named Vivekananda trust.

== Politics ==
She won as a M.P. from Anakapalli Lok Sabha constituency by defeating Adari Anandkumar by a majority of 89192 votes. She also attended parliament debates and had average of 86% which is higher than state average attendance.
