= Bandaru Satyanarayana Murthy =

Indian politician

Member of the Andhra Pradesh Legislative Assembly
- Incumbent
- Assumed office 2024
- Preceded by: Budi Mutyala Naidu
- Constituency: Madugula
- In office 2014–2019
- Preceded by: Panchakarla Ramesh Babu
- Succeeded by: Annamreddy Adeep Raj
- Constituency: Pendurthi
- In office 1989–2004
- Preceded by: Palla Appal Naidu
- Succeeded by: Gandi Babji
- Constituency: Paravada

Personal details
- Party: Telugu Desam Party

Bandaru Satyanarayana Murthy is an Indian politician from Andhra Pradesh. He is a member of Telugu Desam Party. He has been elected as the Member of the Legislative Assembly representing the Madugula Assembly constituency in 2024 Andhra Pradesh Legislative Assembly elections.
