= Anakapalli =

City in Andhra Pradesh, India

Anakapalli Ankapalle, Aniankapalli, Anekaphalle
- Town
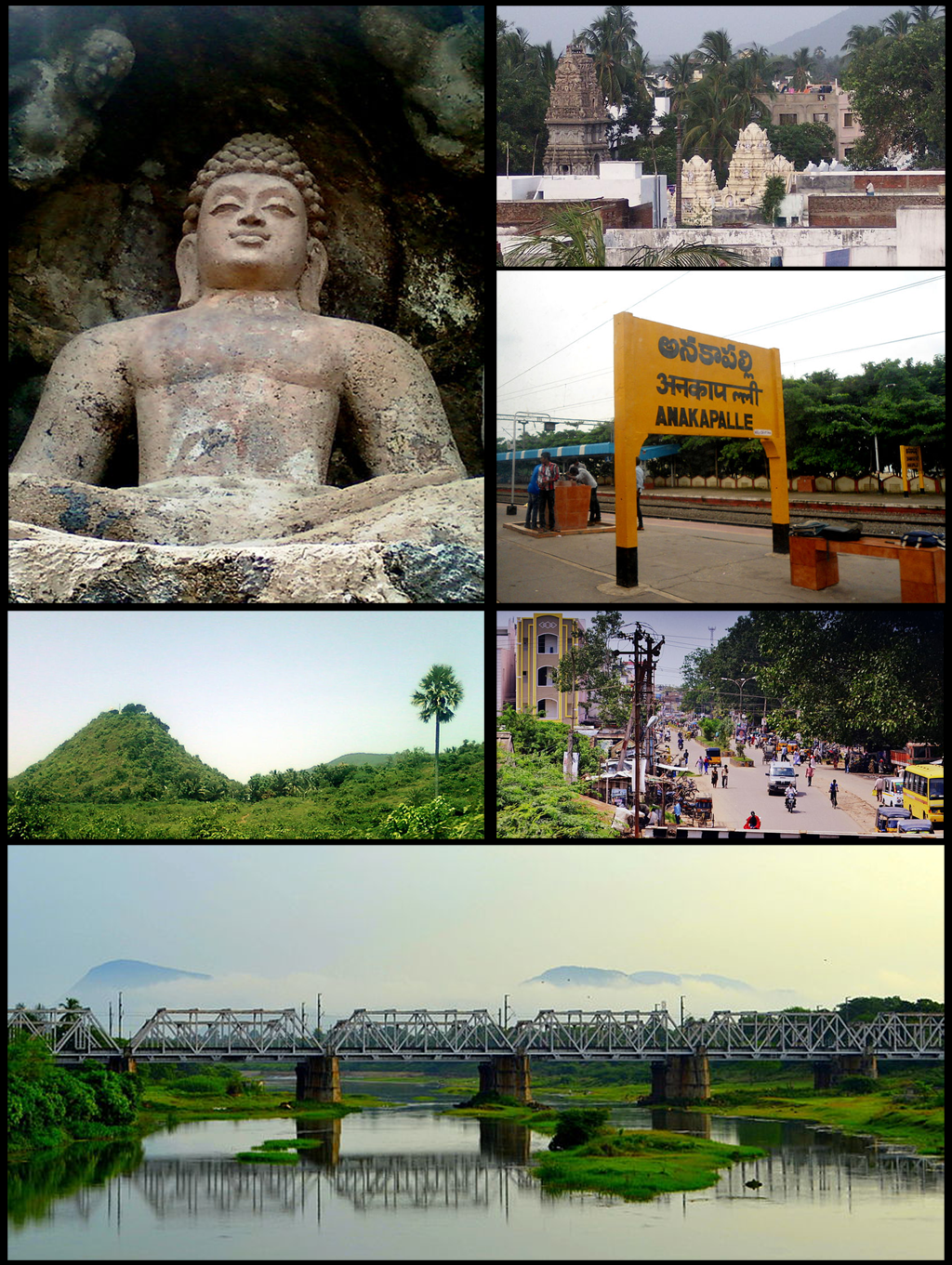
- Anakapalli montage Clockwise from top left: rock-cut Buddha statue at Bojjannakonda, view of Anakapalli, Anakapalli railway station, streets of Anakapalli, rail bridge on Sarada River, view of Satyanarayana Konda

- Location in Andhra Pradesh
- Coordinates: 17.6913°N 83.0039°E
- Country: India
- State: Andhra Pradesh
- District: Anakapalli
- Region: Uttarandhra

Government
  - Type: Municipal corporation
  - Body: Municipal Corporation, Visakhapatnam Metropolitan Region Development Authority
  - MLA: Konathala Ramakrishna
  - MP: C. M. Ramesh

Area
  - Total: 23.28 km^{2} (8.99 sq mi)
- Elevation: 29 m (95 ft)

Population (2011)
  - Total: 86,519
  - Density: 3,716/km^{2} (9,626/sq mi)

Languages
  - Official: Telugu
- Time zone: UTC+5:30 (IST)
- PIN: 531001/02
- Telephone code: 08924
- Vehicle Registration: AP31 (Former); AP39 (from 30 January 2019)
- Vidhan Sabha constituency: Anakapalli
- Lok Sabha constituency: Anakapalli

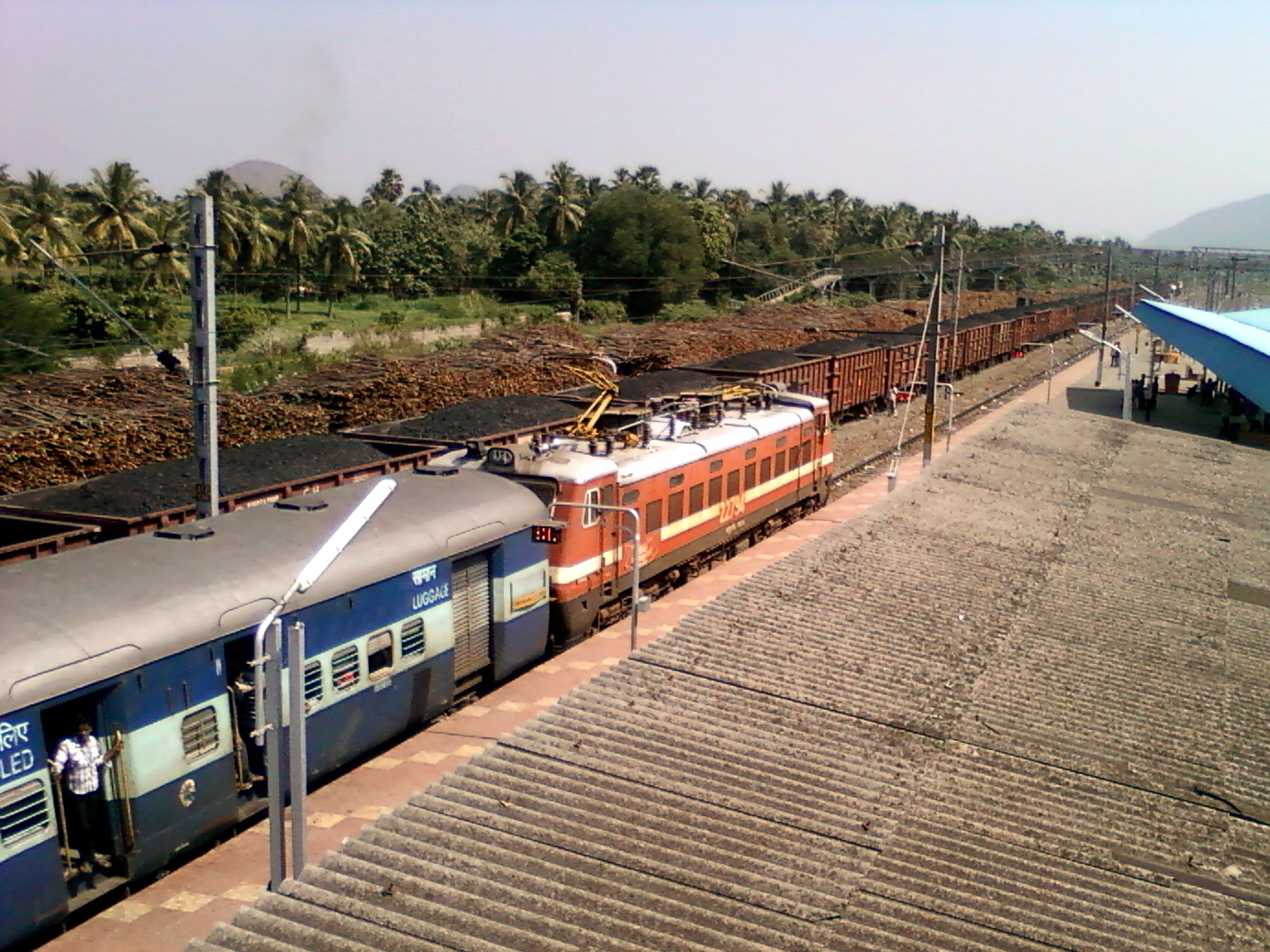
Anakapalli railway station

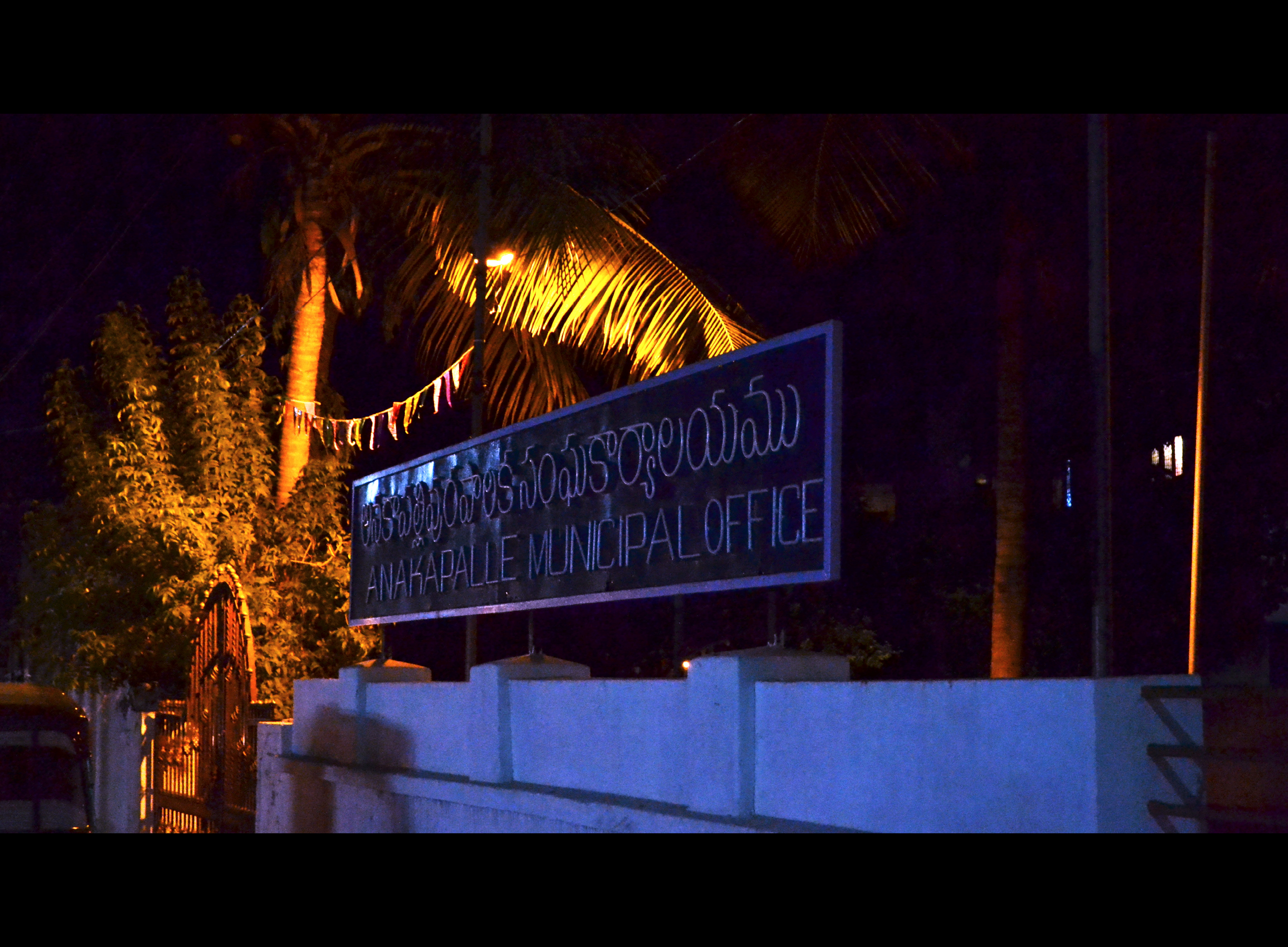
Anakapalli Municipal Office

Anakapalli (Telugu pronunciation: [ana'kaːpalːi]) is one of the Major Town in Andhra Pradesh and also District headquarter of Anakapalli district. Ankapalli is well known it's jaggery It contains India's second largest jaggery market.

== History ==
=== Buddhist era ===
One of the most significant Buddhist sites in Andhra Pradesh, Sankaram, is located 3.5 km (2.2 mi) away from Anakapalli and 41 km (25 mi) away from Visakhapatnam on the Sabbavaram by-pass road. The name Sankaram derives from the term Sangharama. Sankaram is famous for its many votive stupas, rock-cut caves, brick-built structural edifices, early historic pottery, and Satavahana coins that date back to the 1st century AD. The main stupa here was initially carved out of rock and then covered with bricks.

There are a number of visible images of the Buddha carved on the rock face of the caves. At Lingalametta, there are hundreds of rock-cut monolithic stupas in rows, spread over the hill. Among other Buddhist attractions here are relic caskets, three chaitya halls, votive platforms, and Vajrayana sculptures. The Vihara was functional for around a millennium and saw the development of not only the Theravada form of Buddhism but also Mahayana and Vajrayana Buddhism.

=== Medieval era ===
The town was ruled by the Kalinga Empire within ancient Odisha. Different dynasties ruled this region, including the Chedi Kingdom of Kalinga, the Eastern Ganga dynasty, the Gajapati Kingdom, the Kakatiya dynasty, and the Qutub Shahi dynasty. Around 1611, Kakarlapudi Appala Raju Payakarao conquered the region under the Sultanate of Golconda, establishing his fortified headquarters in Anakapalli. Additionally, the area was ruled by various dynasties including the Satavahanas, Vishnukundina, Gajapati dynasty, Vijayanagara Samrats, and Golkonda Samanta Rajulu.

The aliases of Anakapalli are Aniankapalli, Anekaphalle, Vijaypuri, Veniapalii, Kanakapuri, Bellampatnam, and Anakapally. It is located by the side of the Sarada River.

Anakapalli was an estate within the Visakhapatnam District of the Madras Presidency. Originally belonging to the Rajas of Vijayanagaram, it passed entirely into the hands of the family through an auction purchase in 1802, and was later resold by the Raja to Gode Jaggappa. It consists of 16 villages and 17 hamlets.

The Anakapalli taluk contains 45 towns and villages and 154 hamlets, all zamindaris (private estate holders) with 27,929 occupied houses and 131,637 inhabitants. According to the 1881 British Indian census, the population included 130,667 Hindus, 1,367 Muslims, and 3 Christians. The area had a criminal court, and in civil matters, it was under the jurisdiction of the Munsif's Court at Rayavaram.

Anakapalli town, which is located in Anakapalli taluk, Visakhapatnam district, Madras Presidency, lies 20 mi (32 km) southwest of Visakhapatnam on the Sarada River and the Grand Trunk Road. In 1881, the population of the town was 13,341, with 3,810 houses. Much of the surrounding area historically belonged to the king of Vijayanagara. Recently, it has experienced a growth spurt as an agricultural center, due to its molasses and small-scale cotton export businesses.

== Freedom struggle ==
Before the Sepoy Mutiny, the French were attacked in Anakapalli in 1753. Bassi Dora was arrested at Kasimkota. Many freedom leaders visited Anakapalli, including Dr. B. R. Ambedkar and Mahatma Gandhi, who started the movement to boycott foreign goods in Anakapalli. Gandhi started his speech at Bellam Market in Anakapalli. The farmers requested that Gandhi name the jaggery market as Gandhi Market. He accepted the request. Other leaders visited, including N. G. Ranga and CPI's Jaya Prakash Narayan. One year later, Jawaharlal Nehru and Subhash Chandra Bose also gave speeches at Anakapalli.

During 1944–45, Sri Koribilli Jogarao (Teacher) and Jakkanahalli Sri Ramamurthy (Compounder) participated in the freedom struggle and spoke against the movement and were sent to Rai Vellore Jail.

== Geography ==
Anakapalli is located at 17.6913°N 83.0039°E, on the banks of River Sarada and at an altitude of 29 m (95 ft). It is spread over an area of 23.28 km^{2} (8.99 sq mi).

== Demographics ==
According to The Imperial Gazetteer of India, Anakapalli had an area of 297 square miles (770 km^{2}), containing 143 villages.

As of the 2001 Indian census, Anakapalli had a population of 84,523. Males constituted 50% of the population and females 50%. Anakapalli had an average literacy rate of 67%, higher than the national average of 59.5%, with 54% of the males and 46% of females literate. 10% of the population were under 6 years old.

== Governance ==
Anakapalli Municipality dates back to 1877. Anakapalli became a municipality using the Madras City Development Act. According to the Madras District Municipality Act of 1884, they were decided to have 13 members. The municipality had a directly elected municipal chairman in 1885 and 1897. It became a first grade municipality in 1956, consisting of 32 wards. This municipality earns an annual revenue of around 1 crore. Later, this was merged into G.V.M.C in 2015 of zone-07.

== Economy ==
Agriculture production in the region mainly consists of rice, corn, sugarcane, and vegetables. The chief crop cultivated in this region is sugarcane. Anakapalli is well known for its jaggery market, which is the second-largest in India. Velagapudi Steels own a steel mill near Anakapalli.

== Notable temples ==
- Bojjannakondaancient Buddhist site
- Nookambika Temple

== Social welfare and clubs ==
Local social welfare groups include Anakapalli Merchant Association Sri Gauri Granthalayam and Sharada Granthalayam Anakapalli Rotary Club (1953), Lions Club (1966), Premasamajam (1943), Gouri Yuvajana Seva Gangam (1966), and Gouri Seva Sangam (1970). There are clubs like N.T.R. Stadium and Rao Gopal Rao Kala Kshetra, and an indoor stadium.

== Theatres ==
The theaters in this town include Shri Satya Theatre, Satyanarayana Theatre, Venkateswara Theatre, Raja Theatre, Ramachandra Theatre, Parthi Sai Theatre, and Shiridi Sai Theatre.

== Transport ==
National Highway 16, a part of the Golden Quadrilateral highway network, bypasses the town. Anakapalle railway station is on the Howrah–Chennai main line. It is under the Vijayawada division of the South Coast Railway zone. APSRTC runs buses all over the state. Vizag city buses run from Maddilapalem, Dwaraka Bus Station, Gajuwaka, Yelamanchili, and other locations. Anakapalle Lok Sabha Constituency MP Dr. Beesetti Venkata Satyavathi of YSRCP laid the stone while Prime Minister Narendra Modi inaugurated it and virtually attended.

== Notable people ==
- P. Appalanarasimham
- Rohini Molleti
- Konathala Ramakrishna
- Dadi Veerabhadra Rao
- Sirivennela Seetharama Sastry
- Villuri Venkataramana
