= Nookalamma =

Hindu deity

Nookallamma (or Nookambika) is a local deity or Gramadevata popular in Andhra Pradesh State of India.

The temple houses the goddess Nookambika.The King who ruled Anakapalli area Sri Kakarlapudi Appalaraju Payakarao built this temple to Kakatambika, a family goddess. She would later be called Nookambika or Nookalamma. On "Kottha Amavasya", a day before Ugadi, thousands of people from throughout Andhra Pradesh come to the temple for worship.

== Goddess ==
Sri Sri Sri Nookambika Ammavaru is one of the nine Shakti forms and popularly known as Sri Anagha Devi in ancient days. After a few years in the era of Kakatiya kings, the temple was renovated and the same goddess was worshipped with the name Sri Kakatamba. Daily pujas and diparadhanas are performed here. As the kings lost their dynasties, the daily pujas and other rituals were interrupted and slowly the temple lost its previous glory.

It is believed that the creator of the universe was Sri Shakti Ammavaru and that the creation took place in the time period from Palguna Bahula Amavasya (the new moon day) to April (new moon day). During this holy period there are a lot of religious rituals and pujas that are performed to Sri Nookambica Ammavaru. Sunday, Tuesday and Thursday are considered auspicious days for performing puja to Sri Nookambika Ammavaru.

== Temple ==
Approximately 450 years ago, in late 1611 AD, the Arcot Nawab appointed Sri Kakarlapudi Appalaraju Payakarao as King for the Anakapalli area. He renovated the temple and brought back past glory and the local goddess as Sri Nookambika Ammavaru.

Sri Sri Sri Nookambika Ammavari temple was taken over by the Endowments Department in the year 1935. Funds of this temple are contributed for renovations of temples from Godavari districts to the Berhempur district. An officer in the cadre of the assistant commissioner is appointed as executive officer.

Now the income of the temple runs to a tune of 68 lakhs per year. With the contribution of donors, new cottages were constructed and also roads to the temple were constructed.
