= Sabbam Hari =

Indian politician (1952–2021)

Member of parliament, Lok Sabha
- In office 2009–2014
- Preceded by: Pappala Chalapathirao
- Succeeded by: Muttamsetti Srinivasa Rao
- Constituency: Anakapalli

Personal details
- Born: 1 June 1952 Andhra Pradesh
- Died: 3 May 2021 (aged 68)
- Spouse: Lakshmi
- Children: One son : Sabbam Venkat and two daughters

Sabbam Hari (1 June 1952 – 3 May 2021) was an Indian politician.

He served as Member of parliament, Lok Sabha, and was a Congress MP from Anakapalle constituency (elected 2009). Hari died from COVID-19 in May 2021.

== Positions held ==
- Member of Parliament in 15th Lok Sabha
- Member, Parliamentary Committee on Industry
- Mayor, Visakha Municipal Corporation (VMC)
