= Raju =

Raju, Telugu Caste

- Languages: Telugu
- Populated states: Andhra Pradesh

The Raju are a Telugu caste found mostly in the Indian state of Andhra Pradesh.

== Etymology and Early references ==
Raju is a Telugu language variant of the Sanskrit title Raja, a term for a monarch or princely ruler. Cynthia Talbot describes the term as being:

...most often used by members of noble or princely lineages. [But it] could also designate an individual employed by a lord or prince.

In medieval Andhra Pradesh, the title was used in both senses, and was very likely adopted by some secular Brahmins, who occupied important advisory functions. Talbot distinguishes between "royal rājus", who were of royal or noble descent, and "clerical rājus", who were secular Brahman officials. The royal usage at that time was particularly prevalent in the northern coastal areas of the region, where rāju was the preferred appellation among several royal families, including the Parichchhedis, Chagis, Kolani princes and the Kota dynasty. Talbot also notes that the title, and others in use at that time, do not align with the Vedic four-fold varna system and in that sense could not refer to a caste. However, they do appear to have conformed to

...the existence of broad social categories based primarily on occupation. Although [the title] did not necessarily designate a distinct class, much less a bounded community, or a hereditary grouping, various sets of these titles differentiated social types marked by a common status and shared occupation.

Talbot identifies rāju, together with mahārāja and cakravarti, as belonging to a category associated with royalty or nobility. She further identifies a relatively circumscribed royal or noble social category in which the titles mahārāja and rāju circulated, and notes that claims to Kshatriya status were more common among men bearing these titles than among holders of certain other titles found in medieval Andhra inscriptions.

Temple inscriptions from the period of the Kakatiya dynasty, a South Indian dynasty that flourished between 1175 and 1324 CE in the Telugu-speaking lands now in Andhra Pradesh, refer both to royal and clerical rajus as donors, together with peasant leaders called Reddies.

== Varna Status ==
The Raju caste, which A. Satyanarayana calls the "locally dominant landed gentry", claims Kshatriya status in the varna system despite there being "no real Kshatriya varna" in the Andhra region. (Note: The anthropologist Minna Säävälä glossarises the present-day Rajus as a "higher caste of traditional warriors and rulers; Kshatriya", but does not provide an explanation or source for this description.) A. Satyanarayana further classifies the Raju/Kshatriya caste as one of the three communities—alongside the Brahmins and the Arya Vaishya/Komati—that constitute the upper-caste dwijas segment in the local social order and are recognized as claimants to the "twice-born" status.

== Population ==
A report published by the Overseas Development Institute in 2002, describing the Rajus of Andhra as an ex-warrior caste, noted that along with the Kapu and Velama they were

...important communities with considerable political significance in the State, although in numerical terms they constitute only a small percentage of the population and spatially are confined only to small pockets.

As of 2002 the Rajus constituted less than 1 per cent of the population in Andhra Pradesh, concentrated mainly in the coastal region.
