= Mindi =

- Neighbourhood
- Location in Visakhapatnam
- Coordinates: 17.703980°N 83.211921°E
- Country: India
- State: Andhra Pradesh
- District: Visakhapatnam

Government
  - Body: Greater Visakhapatnam Municipal Corporation

Languages
  - Official: Telugu
- Time zone: UTC+5:30 (IST)
- PIN: 530012, 530015
- Vehicle registration: AP 32 and AP 33

Mindi is a suburb area in Visakhapatnam, Andhra Pradesh, India.

== Entertainment ==
Globex Shopping Mall is at NH Road accessible here. There is a multiplex with 5 screens.

== Transport ==
APSRTC buses are available here from city.

APSRTC routes

Route number	Start	End	Via
38A	Mindi	RTC Complex	BHPV, Airport, NAD Kotharoad, Birla Junction, Gurudwar
36	Mindi	Collector Office	BHPV, Gajuwaka, Malkapuram, Scindia, Convent, Town Kotharoad, Jagadamba Centre
400M	Mindi	Arilova Colony	BHPV, Gajuwaka, Malkapuram, Scindia, Railway station, RTC Complex, Maddilapalem, Hanumanthuwaka
