= Administration of Visakhapatnam =

Municipality in India

The Administration of Visakhapatnam officially started in 1803, with the municipality of Visakhapatnam being established in 1861. Currently, it is known as the Greater Visakhapatnam Municipal Corporation (GVMC). Its total area is 681 km^{2} (263 sq mi) with 98 wards and 8 zones. The mayor is elected by corporators who are representative of their wards.

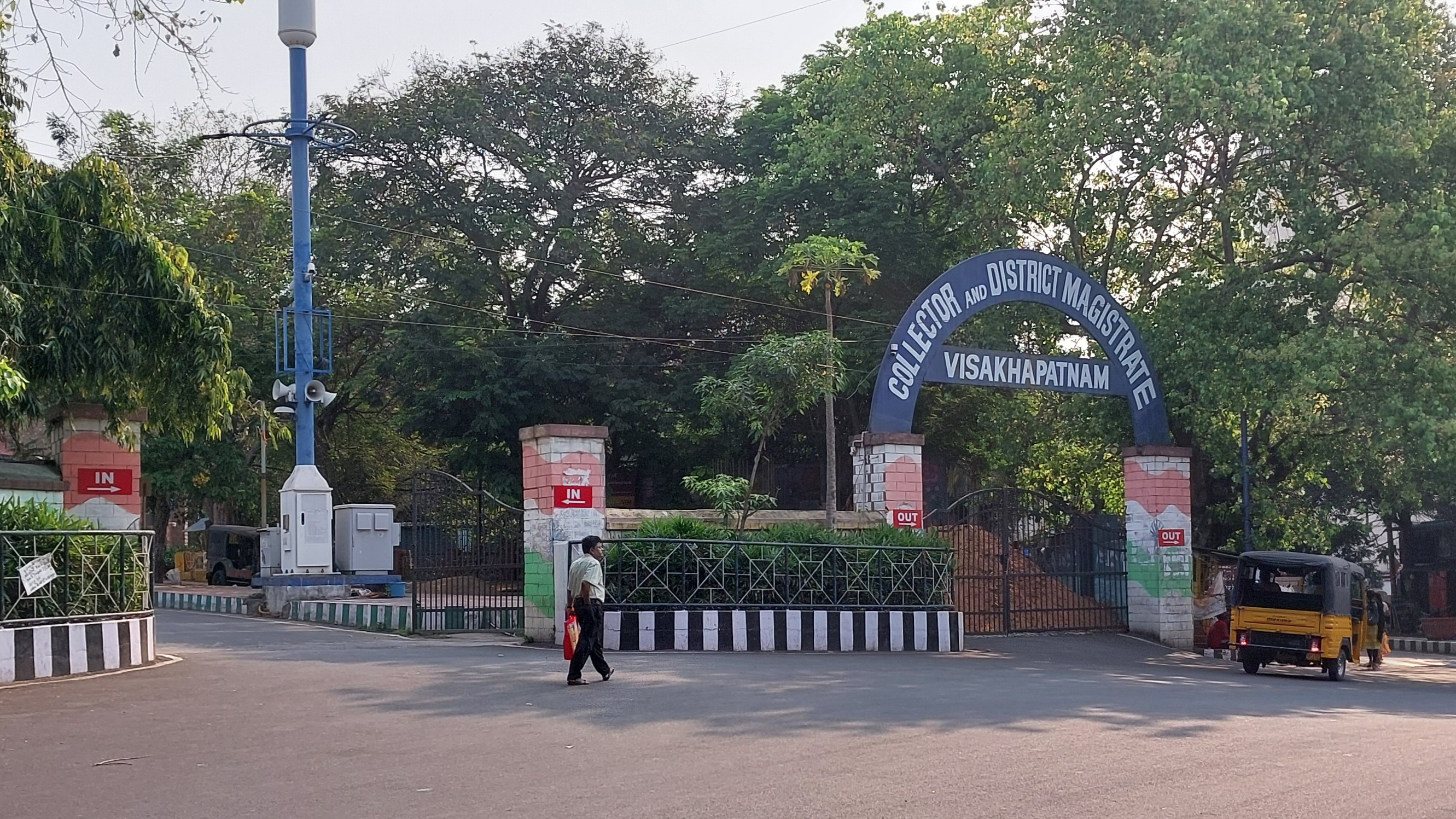
Collectorate Building, administrative HQ of Visakhapatnam,

The Visakhapatnam Metropolitan Region Development Authority is a metropolitan planning development authority founded in 2018 that covers the Visakhapatnam metro area, spreading out across Visakhapatnam district, Anakapalli district and Vizianagaram district. Its total jurisdictional area is 7,328 km^{2} (2,829 sq mi), including 32 mandals in Visakhapatnam district and 16 mandals in Vizianagaram district.

The Visakhapatnam City Police was established in 1983. It is headed by a police commissioner and assisted by a joint police commissioner and includes two zones and 44 police stations. Its police system is one of the oldest in India, celebrating its 160-year anniversary in 2021.

Visakhapatnam has two parliament seats in Visakhapatnam and Anakapalli, and also has 8 assembly constituencies: Visakhapatnam East, Visakhapatnam South, Visakhapatnam North, Visakhapatnam West, Pendurthi, Gajuwaka, Bheemili and Anakapalle.

== Utility services ==
Water and sanitation is maintained by the GVMC, with all water bodies under its control, supplying water from Raiwada Reservoir, Tatipudi Reservoir, Meghadri Gedda Reservoir, Kanithi Balancing Reservoir and the Godavari water pipeline.

Electricity is regulated through Andhra Pradesh Eastern Power Distribution Company Limited to the city. The Andhra Pradesh State Disaster Response and Fire Services Department provides emergency services.
