= Chodavaram Assembly constituency =

Constituency of the Andhra Pradesh Legislative Assembly, India

Coordinates: 17.83°N 82.93°E

Chodavaram
- Constituency No. 26 for the Andhra Pradesh Legislative Assembly
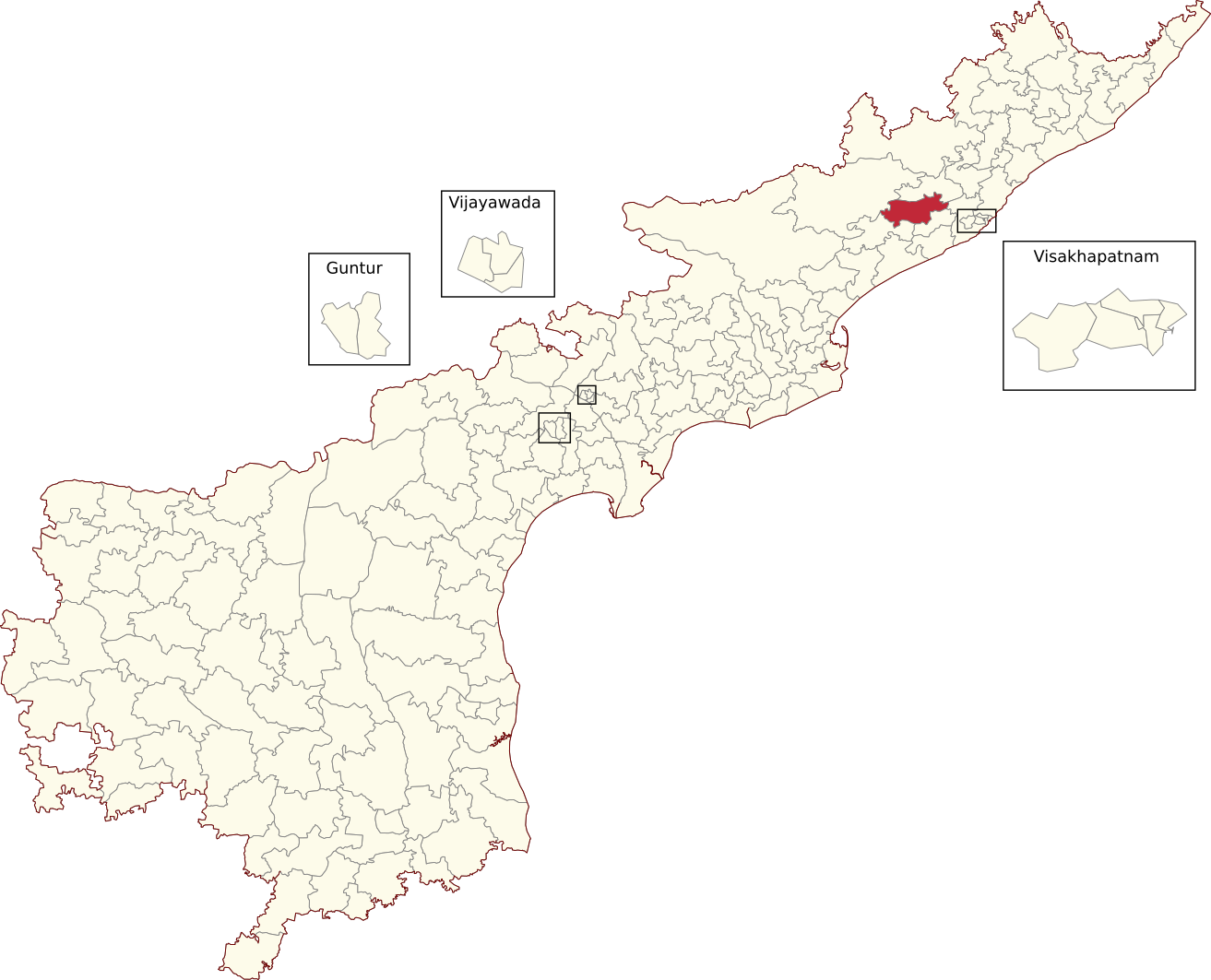
- Location of Chodavaram Assembly constituency within Andhra Pradesh

Constituency details
- Country: India
- Region: South India
- State: Andhra Pradesh
- District: Anakapalli
- Lok Sabha constituency: Anakapalli
- Established: 1951
- Total electors: 210,313
- Reservation: None

Member of Legislative Assembly
- 16th Andhra Pradesh Legislative Assembly
- Incumbent Kalidindi Suryana Naga Sanyasi Raju
- Party: TDP
- Alliance: NDA
- Elected year: 2024

Chodavaram Assembly constituency is a constituency in Anakapalle district of Andhra Pradesh that elects representatives to the Andhra Pradesh Legislative Assembly in India. It is one of the seven assembly segments of Anakapalli Lok Sabha constituency.

Kalidindi Suryana Naga Sanyasi Raju is the current MLA of the constituency, having won the 2024 Andhra Pradesh Legislative Assembly election from Telugu Desam Party. As of 2019, there are a total of 210,313 electors in the constituency. The constituency was established in 1951, as per the Delimitation Orders (1951).

== Mandals ==
The four mandals that form the assembly constituency are:

Mandal
Chodavaram
Butchayyapeta
Ravikamatham
Rolugunta

Mandals in Chodavaram Assembly Constituency

== Members of the Legislative Assembly ==
| Year | Member | Political party |
|---|---|---|
| 1952 | Kandarpa Venkataramesam | Krishikar Lok Party |
| 1955 | Reddy Jagannadham | Independent |
| 1962 | Ilapakuthi Satyanarayana | Indian National Congress |
| 1967 | Palavelli Vechalapu | Swatantra Party |
| 1972 | Palavelli Vechalapu | Indian National Congress |
| 1978 | Emani Seetharama Sastri | Janata Party |
| 1983 | Gunuru Yerrunaidu | Telugu Desam Party |
| 1985 | Gunuru Yerrunaidu | Telugu Desam Party |
| 1989 | Balireddy Satya Rao | Indian National Congress |
| 1994 | Gunuru Yerrunaidu | Telugu Desam Party |
| 1999 | Balireddy Satya Rao | Indian National Congress |
| 2004 | Ganta Srinivasa Rao | Telugu Desam Party |
| 2009 | Kalidindi Suryana Naga Sanyasi Raju | Telugu Desam Party |
| 2014 | Kalidindi Suryana Naga Sanyasi Raju | Telugu Desam Party |
| 2019 | Karanam Dharmasri | YSR Congress Party |
| 2024 | Kalidindi Suryana Naga Sanyasi Raju | Telugu Desam Party |

== Election results ==
=== 1952 ===
1952 Madras State Legislative Assembly election: Chodavaram
| Party | Candidate | Votes | % | ±% |
|---|---|---|---|---|
| KLP | Kandarpa Venkataramesam | 16,168 | 46.99% | |
| INC | Bhupathiraju Satyanarayana Raju | 8,849 | 25.72% | 25.72% |
| KMPP | Mandhambhotla Narasimhamorthy | 6,473 | 18.81% | |
| Independent | Pilla Puradesi Najudu | 2,918 | 8.48% | |
| Margin of victory | | 7,319 | 21.27% | |
| Turnout | | 34,408 | 51.08% | |
| Registered electors | | 67,363 | | |
| win (new seat) | | | | |

=== 1955 ===
1955 Andhra State Legislative Assembly election: Chodavaram
| Party | Candidate | Votes | % | ±% |
|---|---|---|---|---|
| Independent | Reddi Jagannadham | 12,658 | 39.55 | |
| KLP | Bojanki Naidu | 11,796 | 36.86 | ▼10.13 |
| CPI | Polamarasetti Murty | 7,550 | 23.59 | |
| Majority | | 862 | 2.69 | ▼18.58 |
| Turnout | | 32,004 | 53.98 | ▲2.90 |
| Independent hold | | Swing | | |

=== 1962 ===
1962 Andhra Pradesh Legislative Assembly election: Chodavaram
| Party | Candidate | Votes | % | ±% |
|---|---|---|---|---|
| INC | Ilapakuthi Satyanarayana | 14,776 | 56.60 | |
| Independent | Bojanki Gangayyanaidu | 11,329 | 43.39 | |
| Majority | | 3,447 | 13.21 | ▲10.52 |
| Turnout | | 26,105 | | |
| INC gain from Independent | | Swing | | |

=== 1967 ===
1967 Andhra Pradesh Legislative Assembly election: Chodavaram
| Party | Candidate | Votes | % | ±% |
|---|---|---|---|---|
| SWA | Palavelli Vechalapu | 36,900 | 63.08 | |
| INC | I. Satyanarayana | 21,600 | 36.92 | ▼19.68 |
| Majority | | 15,300 | 26.16 | ▲12.95 |
| Turnout | | 58,500 | 76.37 | |
| SWA gain from INC | | Swing | | |

=== 1972 ===
1972 Andhra Pradesh Legislative Assembly election: Chodavaram
| Party | Candidate | Votes | % | ±% |
|---|---|---|---|---|
| INC | Palavelli Vechalapu | 35,784 | 55.61 | ▼7.47 |
| Independent | Surya Boddu | 58,560 | 44.39 | |
| Majority | | 7,224 | 11.22 | ▼14.94 |
| Turnout | | 64,344 | 76.64 | ▲0.27 |
| INC hold | | Swing | | |

=== 1978 ===
1978 Andhra Pradesh Legislative Assembly election: Chodavaram
| Party | Candidate | Votes | % | ±% |
|---|---|---|---|---|
| JP | Seetharama Sastri Emani | 40,690 | 50.6 | ▲20.2 |
| INC | Palayalli Vechalapu | 28,624 | 35.6 | ▼20.01 |
| Independent | Bhuthanadhu Satyannarayana | 5,876 | 7.3 | |
| Independent | Petla Sanyasirao | 5,266 | 6.6 | |
| Majority | | 12,066 | 14.5 | ▲3.28 |
| Turnout | | 83,395 | 76.4 | ▼0.24 |
| JP gain from INC | | Swing | | |

=== 1983 ===
1983 Andhra Pradesh Legislative Assembly election: Chodavaram
| Party | Candidate | Votes | % | ±% |
|---|---|---|---|---|
| TDP | Gunuru Yerrunaidu | 29,074 | 39.5 | |
| INC | Kannam Naidu Gorle | 19,792 | 26.9 | ▼8.7 |
| Independent | Emani Sitharamasastry | 11,861 | 16.1 | |
| Independent | Surla Satyanarayana | 8,621 | 11.7 | |
| BJP | A. R. G. Sarma | 1,894 | 2.6 | |
| Independent | Gumnla Somulu | 1,644 | 2.2 | |
| LKD | Rapeta Ramunaidu | 667 | 0.9 | |
| Majority | | 9,282 | 12.3 | ▼2.2 |
| Turnout | | 75,236 | 67.6 | ▼8.8 |
| TDP gain from JP | | Swing | | |

=== 1985 ===
1985 Andhra Pradesh Legislative Assembly election: Chodavaram
| Party | Candidate | Votes | % | ±% |
|---|---|---|---|---|
| TDP | Gunuru Yerrunaidu | 48,946 | 59.7 | ▲20.2 |
| INC | Kannam Naidu Gorle | 31,204 | 38.1 | ▲11.2 |
| Independent | Vennala Swamy Naidu | 1,251 | 1.5 | |
| Independent | Somi Reddy Suryanarayana | 607 | 0.7 | |
| Majority | | 17,742 | 21.1 | ▲8.8 |
| Turnout | | 83,993 | 70.3 | ▲2.7 |
| TDP hold | | Swing | | |

=== 1989 ===
1989 Andhra Pradesh Legislative Assembly election: Chodavaram
| Party | Candidate | Votes | % | ±% |
|---|---|---|---|---|
| INC | Balireddy Satya Rao | 53,274 | 53.8 | ▲15.7 |
| TDP | Gunuru Yerrunaidu | 43,531 | 44.0 | ▼15.7 |
| Independent | Bhupatiraju Sanyasiraju | 1,119 | 1.1 | |
| Independent | Koneti Satya Rao | 1,106 | 1.1 | |
| Majority | | 9,743 | 9.4 | ▼11.7 |
| Turnout | | 103,627 | 75.7 | ▲5.4 |
| INC gain from TDP | | Swing | | |

=== 1994 ===
1994 Andhra Pradesh Legislative Assembly election: Chodavaram
| Party | Candidate | Votes | % | ±% |
|---|---|---|---|---|
| TDP | Gunuru Yerrunaidu | 61,741 | 56.0 | ▲12 |
| INC | Balireddi Satyarao | 42,665 | 38.7 | ▼15.1 |
| BJP | Talapureddi Rao | 2,459 | 2.2 | |
| BSP | Shaik Moulana | 1,151 | 1.0 | |
| Jharkhand Party | Joga China Demudu | 974 | 0.9 | |
| Independent | Koneti Satyarao | 774 | 0.7 | ▼0.4 |
| Independent | Bandi Adinarayana Rao | 543 | 0.5 | |
| Majority | | 19,076 | 16.9 | ▲7.5 |
| Turnout | | 112,939 | 76.6 | ▲0.9 |
| TDP gain from INC | | Swing | | |

=== 1999 ===
1999 Andhra Pradesh Legislative Assembly election: Chodavaram
| Party | Candidate | Votes | % | ±% |
|---|---|---|---|---|
| INC | Balireddy Satya Rao | 57,723 | 50.9 | ▲12.2 |
| TDP | Gunuru Yerrunaidu | 52,205 | 46.1 | ▼9.9 |
| Anna Telugu Desam Party | Jarripothula Rao | 2,534 | 2.2 | |
| NTRTDP(LP) | Bonu Gaddayya | 598 | 0.5 | |
| Independent | Kamireddy Rao | 190 | 0.2 | |
| Independent | Suryanarayana Peela | 88 | 0.1 | |
| Majority | | 5,518 | 4.7 | ▼12.2 |
| Turnout | | 117,058 | 75.7 | ▼0.9 |
| INC gain from TDP | | Swing | | |

=== 2004 ===
2004 Andhra Pradesh Legislative Assembly election: Chodavaram
| Party | Candidate | Votes | % | ±% |
|---|---|---|---|---|
| TDP | Ganta Srinivasa Rao | 63,250 | 52.62 | +6.56 |
| INC | Balireddy Satya Rao | 53,649 | 44.63 | −6.30 |
| Majority | | 9,601 | 7.99 | |
| Turnout | | 120,212 | 78.27 | +5.01 |
| TDP gain from INC | | Swing | | |

=== 2009 ===
2009 Andhra Pradesh Legislative Assembly election: Chodavaram
| Party | Candidate | Votes | % | ±% |
|---|---|---|---|---|
| TDP | Kalidindi Suryana Naga Sanyasi Raju | 55,641 | 36.13 | −16.49 |
| INC | Karanam Dharmasri | 54,256 | 35.23 | −9.40 |
| PRP | Pinapolu Venkateswaralu | 35,185 | 22.85 | |
| Majority | | 1,385 | 0.90 | |
| Turnout | | 153,994 | 81.15 | +2.88 |
| TDP hold | | Swing | | |

=== 2014 ===
2014 Andhra Pradesh Legislative Assembly election: Chodavaram
| Party | Candidate | Votes | % | ±% |
|---|---|---|---|---|
| TDP | KSNS Raju | 80,560 | 48.63 | +12.50 |
| YSRCP | Karanam Dharmasri | 79,948 | 48.08 | |
| Majority | | 612 | 0.31 | |
| Turnout | | 166,583 | 84.81 | +3.66 |
| TDP hold | | Swing | | |

=== 2019 ===
2019 Andhra Pradesh Legislative Assembly election: Chodavaram
| Party | Candidate | Votes | % | ±% |
|---|---|---|---|---|
| YSRCP | Karanam Dharmasri | 94,215 | 53.92 | +5.84 |
| TDP | KSNS Raju | 66,578 | 38.10 | −10.53 |
| JSP | P. V. S. N. Raju | 5,300 | 3.03 | |
| Majority | | 27,637 | | |
| Turnout | | | | |
| YSRCP gain from TDP | | Swing | | |

=== 2024 ===
2024 Andhra Pradesh Legislative Assembly election: Chodavaram
| Party | Candidate | Votes | % | ±% |
|---|---|---|---|---|
| TDP | Kalidindi Suryana Naga Sanyasi Raju | 109,651 | 59.03 | +20.93 |
| YSRCP | Karanam Dharmasri | 67462 | 36.32 | −17.60 |
| INC | Jagath Srinivas | 2527 | | |
| NOTA | None Of The Above | 3849 | | |
| Majority | | 42189 | | |
| Turnout | | 185741 | | |
| TDP gain from YSRCP | | Swing | | |

== See also ==
- List of constituencies of the Andhra Pradesh Legislative Assembly
