= Sarada River =

Coordinates: 17°26′N 82°52′E

Sarada
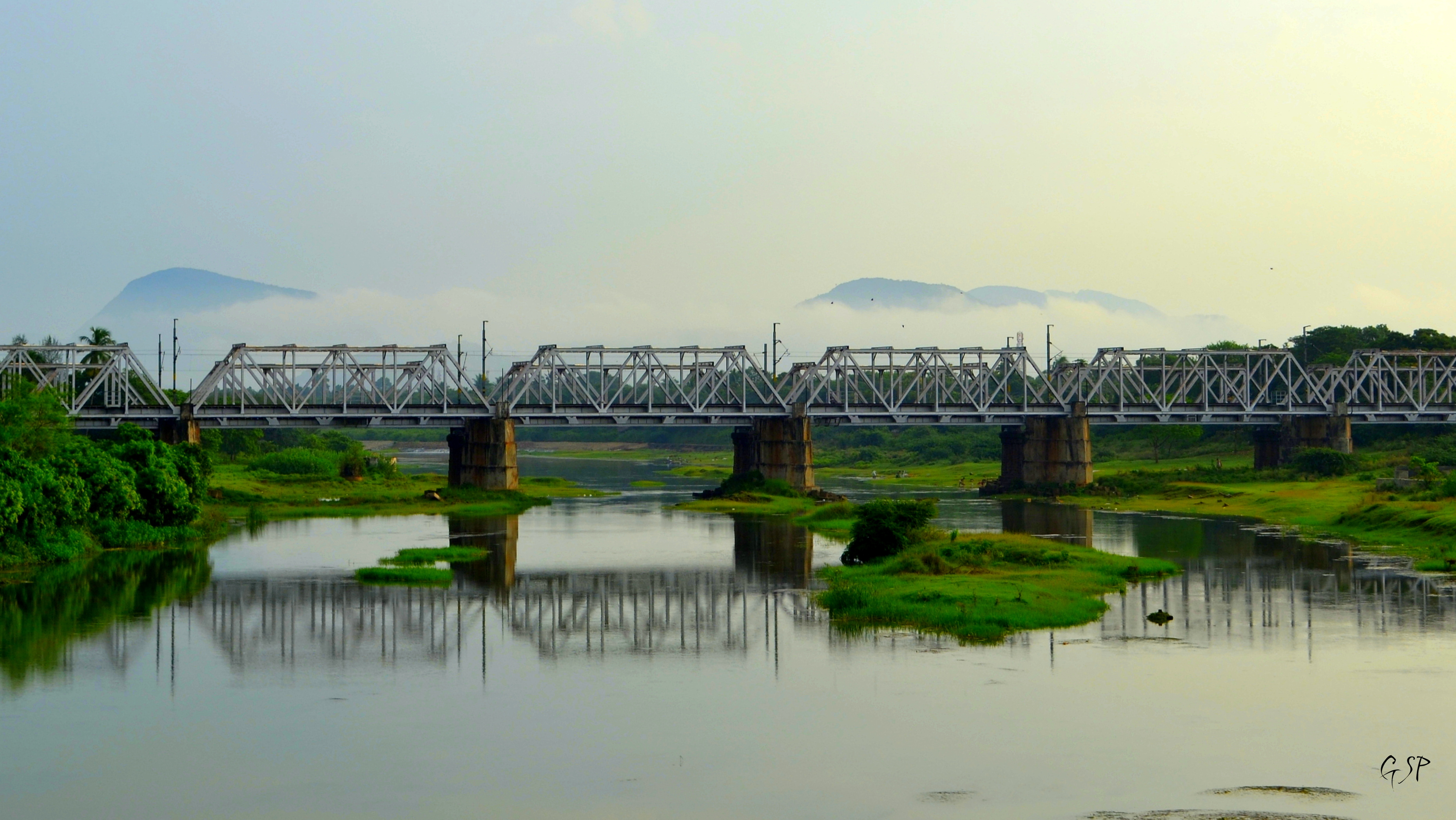
- The Sarada River Bridge in Anakapalle, Andhra Pradesh.
- Course of the Sarada River

Physical characteristics
- Mouth: Bay of Bengal

Basin features
- Cities: Anakapalli

River Sarada is a medium-sized river in Alluri Sitharama Raju and Anakapalli districts of Andhra Pradesh, India.

The catchment area of the basin is 2,665 square kilometers. It rises at an elevation of 1,000 meters in the Eastern Ghats. It runs eastwards for a distance 122 kilometers and joins the Bay of Bengal.

The basin is surrounded by River Nagavali in the north, River Gosthani, Gambiramgedda, Meghadri Gedda in the east Bay of Bengal in the South and Machhkund sub-basin of the River Godavari in the west. Visakhapatnam is the major city in the basin. Yelamanchili and Anakapalli are important towns in the basin.

== Historical importance ==
The famous Bojjannakonda and Lingalakonda Buddhist cave monastery remains near Anakapalli and The Kotturu Dhanadibbalu near Gokivada forest entrance are located on the left bank of the river. The River Sarada is a major base for irrigation in Visakha district.

== Irrigation projects ==
Pedderu medium irrigation project is constructed on Pedderu a tributary of the Sarada river near Ravipalem village. The project is aimed to irrigate 13,334 acres (53.96 km^{2}) in the Madugula and Ravikamatham mandals in Anakapalli district. The catchment area of the reservoir site is extended over 160 square kilometers. An Anacatta with two big gates, was constructed on the river near Gokivada village to utilise the maximum water for irrigation in Yellamanchili, Ramballi, Atchutapuram mandals.

Raiwada Reservoir with 93 million cubic meters live storage capacity was constructed in the year 1981 for supplying water for irrigation and industrial use.

== Gallery ==
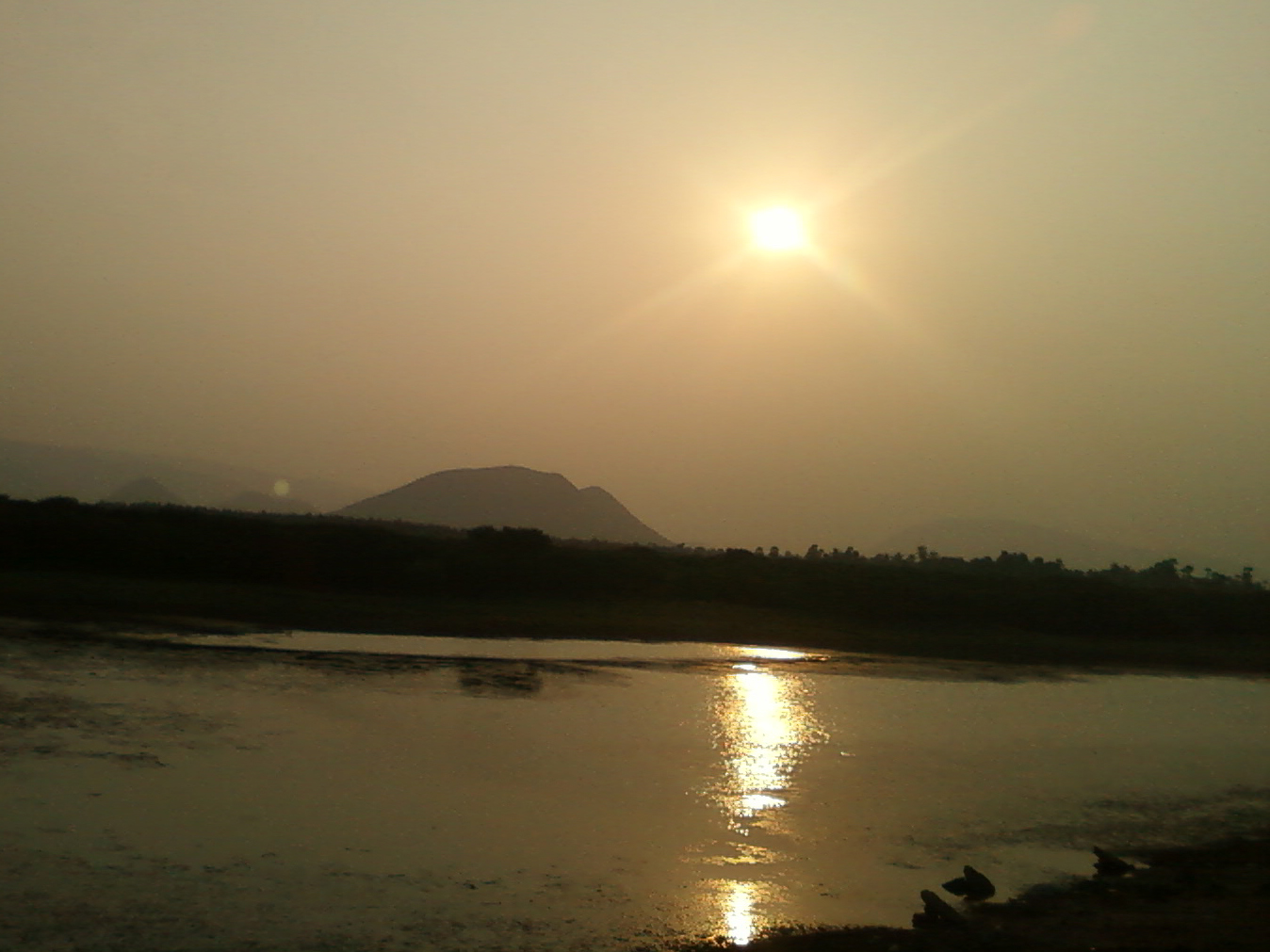
Sunset on river Sarada near Anakapalli in Visakhapatnam District

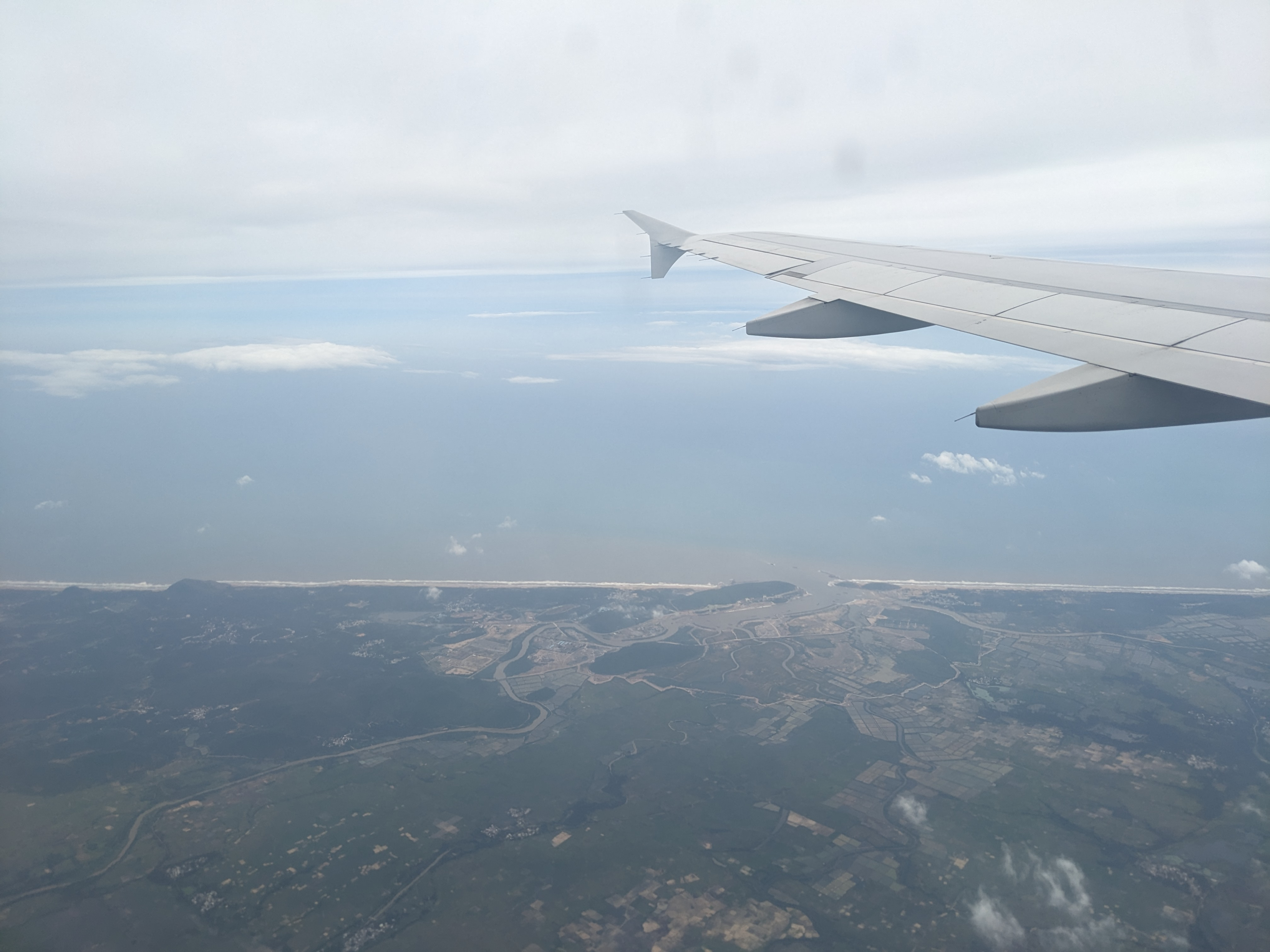
Sarada river joining the Bay of Bengal
