= Budi Mutyala Naidu =

Indian politician

9th Deputy Chief Minister of Andhra Pradesh
- In office 11 April 2022 – 11 June 2024 Serving with Amzath Basha Shaik Bepari; Kottu Satyanarayana; K. Narayana Swamy; Rajanna Dora Peedika
- Governor: Biswabhusan Harichandan; S. Abdul Nazeer
- Chief Minister: Y. S. Jagan Mohan Reddy
- Preceded by: List: Alla Nani; K. Narayana Swamy; Pilli Subhash Chandra Bose; Pamula Pushpa Sreevani; Dharmana Krishna Das
- Succeeded by: Pawan Kalyan
Additional ministries
In office 11 April 2022 – 11 June 2024
Ministry and Departments	Panchayat Raj and Rural Development
Preceded by	Peddireddy Ramachandra Reddy
Succeeded by	Pawan Kalyan

Member of Legislative Assembly, Andhra Pradesh
- In office 2014–2024
- Preceded by: Gavireddi Rama Naidu
- Succeeded by: Bandaru Satyanarayana Murthy
- Constituency: Madugula

Personal details
- Political party: YSR Congress Party

Budi Mutyala Naidu (born 1964) is an Indian politician from Andhra Pradesh. He won the 2014 Andhra Pradesh Legislative Assembly election from Madugula constituency in Visakhapatnam district on the YSR Congress Party ticket. He held the post of deputy chief minister. He lost the Anakapalli MP seat as a YSR Congress Party candidate in the 2024 Indian general election in Andhra Pradesh.

== Early life and education ==
Naidu was born in Taruva village, Anakapalli. His late father Venku Naidu and his wife Ramanamma were farmers. He is from Velama community. He studied intermediate (plus two) at G. J. College, Devarapalli.

== Career ==
Naidu started his political career in 1984 and soon became the president of the Youth Congress, a wing of the Indian National Congress. Later, he became Gram Sarpanch of Taruva village and ZPTC chairman of Devarapalli. After the Indian National Congress he shifted to the YSR Congress Party and became an MLA in 2014, winning the Madugula seat. He won the 2014 Andhra Pradesh Legislative Assembly Election defeating Gavireddi Ramanaidu of the Telugu Desam Party by a margin of 4,761 votes. He was re-elected from Madugula as YSRCP candidate in 2019 Andhra Pradesh Legislative Assembly Election defeating Gavireddi Ramanaidu of the TDP by a margin of 16,392 votes. He later became the Government Whip and one of the deputy chief ministers. In April 2022, he was nominated as the state Panchayat Raj minister and was also made one of the deputy chief ministers. In the 2024 Indian general election in Andhra Pradesh he lost to C. M. Ramesh of the BJP by a margin of 2,96,530 votes.
