= Ministry of Panchayat Raj and Rural Development =

Indian government ministry

Minister of Panchayat Raj and Rural Development
- Pan̄cāyatī Rāj mariyu Grāmīṇābhivr̥d'dhi Śākha Mantrī
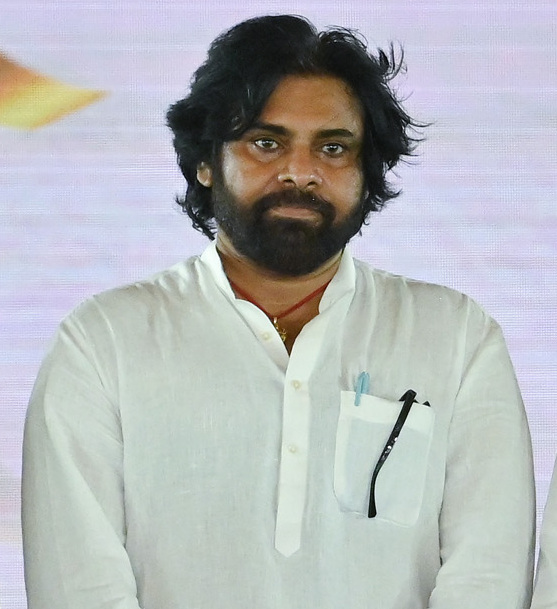
- Incumbent; Pawan Kalyan since 12 June 2024
- Department of Panchayat Raj and Rural Development
- Abbreviation: PR&RD
- Member of: Andha Pradesh Cabinet
- Reports to: Governor of Andhra Pradesh; Chief Minister of Andhra Pradesh; Andhra Pradesh Legislature
- Appointer: Governor of Andhra Pradesh on the advice of the Chief Minister of Andhra Pradesh
- Precursor: Budi Mutyala Naidu
- Inaugural holder: Chintakayala Ayyanna Patrudu
- Formation: 8 June 2014
- Website: Official website

The Minister of Panchayat Raj and Rural Development or simply Rural Development Minister, is the head of the Department of Panchayat Raj and Rural Development of the Government of Andhra Pradesh.

The incumbent minister of the rural development department is the Deputy Chief Minister of Andhra Pradesh, Pawan Kalyan from Janasena Party.

== List of ministers ==
#	Portrait	Minister (Lifespan) Constituency	Term of office			Election (Term)	Party	Ministry	Chief Minister	Ref.
#	Portrait	Minister (Lifespan) Constituency	Term start	Term end	Duration	Election (Term)	Party	Ministry	Chief Minister	Ref.
1		Chintakayala Ayyanna Patrudu; Panchayat Raj (born 1957); MLA for Narsipatnam	8 June 2014	1 April 2017	2 years, 297 days	2014 (14th)	Telugu Desam Party	Naidu III	N. Chandrababu Naidu	
1		Kimidi Mrunalini; Rural Development (born 1958); MLA for Cheepurupalli	8 June 2014	1 April 2017	2 years, 297 days	2014 (14th)	Telugu Desam Party	Naidu III	N. Chandrababu Naidu	
2		Nara Lokesh (born 1983); MLC	2 April 2017	29 May 2019	2 years, 57 days	2014 (14th)	Telugu Desam Party	Naidu III	N. Chandrababu Naidu	
3		Peddireddy Ramachandra Reddy (born 1952); MLA for Punganur	30 May 2019	7 April 2022	2 years, 312 days	2019 (15th)	YSR Congress Party	Jagan	Y. S. Jagan Mohan Reddy	
4		Budi Mutyala Naidu (born 1964); MLA for Madugula	11 April 2022	11 June 2024	2 years, 61 days	2019 (15th)	YSR Congress Party	Jagan	Y. S. Jagan Mohan Reddy	
5		Pawan Kalyan (born 1971); MLA for Pithapuram	12 June 2024	Incumbent	2 years, 88 days	2024 (16th)	Janasena Party	Naidu IV	N. Chandrababu Naidu	
