= Madugula Assembly constituency =

Constituency of the Andhra Pradesh Legislative Assembly, India

Coordinates: 17.91°N 82.81°E

Madugula
- Constituency No. 27 for the Andhra Pradesh Legislative Assembly
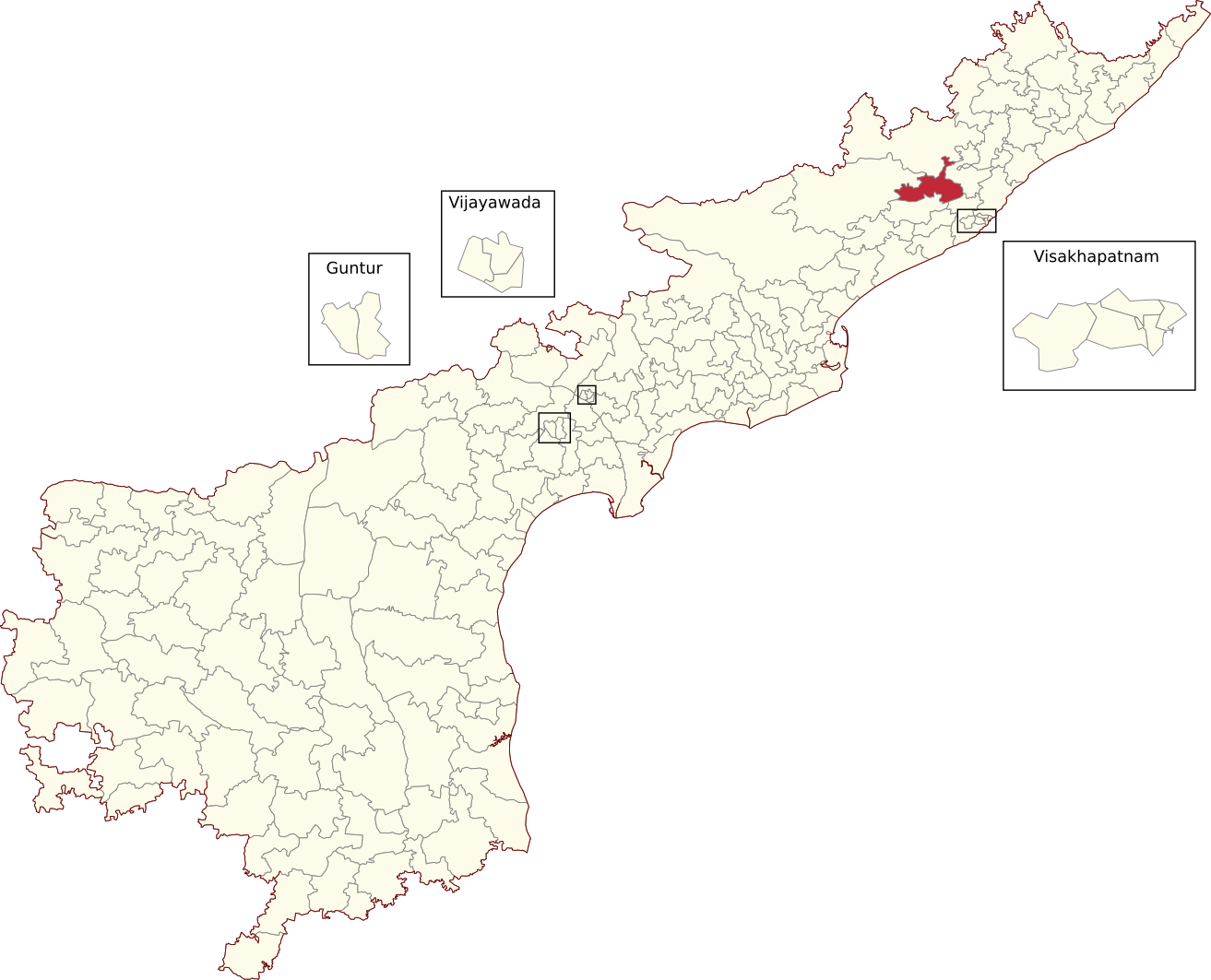
- Location of Madugula Assembly constituency within Andhra Pradesh

Constituency details
- Country: India
- Region: South India
- State: Andhra Pradesh
- District: Anakapalli
- Lok Sabha constituency: Anakapalli
- Established: 1951
- Total electors: 185,791
- Reservation: None

Member of Legislative Assembly
- 16th Andhra Pradesh Legislative Assembly
- Incumbent Bandaru Satyanarayana Murthy
- Party: TDP
- Alliance: NDA
- Elected year: 2024

Madugula Assembly constituency is a constituency in Anakapalli district of Andhra Pradesh that elects representatives to the Andhra Pradesh Legislative Assembly in India. It is one of the seven assembly segments of Anakapalli Lok Sabha constituency.

Bandaru Satyanarayana Murthy is the current MLA of the constituency, having won the 2024 Andhra Pradesh Legislative Assembly election from Telugu Desam Party. As of 2019, there a total of 185,791 electors in the constituency. The constituency was established in 1951, as per the Delimitation Orders (1951).

== Mandals ==
The four mandals that forms the assembly constituency are:

Mandal
Madugula
Cheedikada
Devarapalli
K. Kotapadu

Mandals in Madugula Assembly Constituency

== Members of the Legislative Assembly ==
Year	Member	Political party
1952	Bajinki Gangayya Naidu	Krishikar Lok Party
1955	Donda Sreerama Murty	Praja Socialist Party
1962	Tenneti Viswanatham	Independent
1967	R. K. Devi	Indian National Congress
1972	Boddu Kalavathi	Indian National Congress
1978	Kuracha Ramunaidu	Independent
1983	Reddi Satyanarayana	Telugu Desam Party
1985	Reddi Satyanarayana	Telugu Desam Party
1989	Reddi Satyanarayana	Telugu Desam Party
1994	Reddi Satyanarayana	Telugu Desam Party
1999	Reddi Satyanarayana	Telugu Desam Party
2004	Karanam Dharmasri	Indian National Congress
2009	Gavireddi Rama Naidu	Telugu Desam Party
2014	Budi Mutyala Naidu	YSR Congress Party
2019	Budi Mutyala Naidu	YSR Congress Party
2024	Bandaru Satyanarayana Murthy	Telugu Desam Party

== Election results ==
=== 2024 ===
2024 Andhra Pradesh Legislative Assembly election: Madugula
Party	Candidate	Votes	%	±%
TDP	Bandaru Satyanarayana Murthy	91,869	55.6	
YSRCP	Erli Anuradha	63843	38.64	
INC	BBS Srinivas Rao	1784		
Majority		28026		
Turnout		1,65,221		
TDP gain from YSRCP		Swing		

=== 2019 ===
2019 Andhra Pradesh Legislative Assembly election: Madugula
Party	Candidate	Votes	%	±%
YSRCP	Budi Mutyala Naidu	78,830	50.99	
TDP	Gavireddi Ramanaidu	62438	40.38	
JSP	G. Sanyasi Naidu	3745	2.42	
Majority		16396	10.61	
Turnout				
YSRCP hold		Swing		

=== 2014 ===
2014 Andhra Pradesh Legislative Assembly election: Madugula
Party	Candidate	Votes	%	±%
YSRCP	Budi Mutyala Naidu	72,299	49.13	
TDP	Gavireddi Ramanaidu	67,538	45.89	
Majority		4,761	3.24	
Turnout		147,160	84.66	+3.00
YSRCP gain from TDP		Swing		

=== 2009 ===
2009 Andhra Pradesh Legislative Assembly election: Madugula
Party	Candidate	Votes	%	±%
TDP	Gavireddy Rama Naidu	52,762	37.90	−1.95
INC	A Rama Murthy Naidu	45,935	32.99	−15.22
PRP	Pyala Prasad Rao	32,051	23.02	
Majority		6,827	4.91	
Turnout		139,224	81.66	+5.20
TDP gain from INC		Swing		

=== 2004 ===
2004 Andhra Pradesh Legislative Assembly election: Madugula
Party	Candidate	Votes	%	±%
INC	Karanam Dharmasri	50,361	48.21	+1.48
TDP	Satyanarayana Reddy	41,624	21.79	−12.61
Majority		8,737	28.36	
Turnout		104,455	76.46	+4.71
INC gain from TDP		Swing		

=== 1999 ===
1999 Andhra Pradesh Legislative Assembly election: Madugula
Party	Candidate	Votes	%	±%
TDP	Reddi Satyanarayana	53,407	52.5	▲0.1
INC	Donda Kannababu	47,576	46.7	▲22
Anna Telugu Desam Party	Gavireddi Naidu	824	0.8	
Majority		5,831	5.6	▼21.5
Turnout		104,771	73.8	▼1.2
TDP hold		Swing		

=== 1994 ===
1994 Andhra Pradesh Legislative Assembly election: Madugula
Party	Candidate	Votes	%	±%
TDP	Reddi Satyanarayana	51,230	52.4	▼3.4
INC	Kilaparti Suri Apparao	24,139	24.7	▼19.6
BJP	Surya Rao Dangeti	14,304	14.6	
Independent	Boddeda Rama Rao	5,089	5.2	
BSP	Kamireddi Suryanarayana	1,160	1.2	
Independent	Talari Pedaraju	977	1.0	
Independent	Ch. V.R. Kondalarao	500	0.5	
Independent	Eswararao Bobbadi	229	0.2	
Independent	Boodi Mutyalanaidu	191	0.2	
Majority		27,091	27.1	▲16.1
Turnout		100,087	75.0	▲2.9
TDP hold		Swing		

=== 1989 ===
1989 Andhra Pradesh Legislative Assembly election: Madugula
Party	Candidate	Votes	%	±%
TDP	Reddi Satyanarayana	18,872	55.8	▼13.9
INC	Kuracha Ramunaidu	38,788	44.3	▲17.6
Majority		10,084	11.0	▼30.8
Turnout		91,359	72.1	▲9.5
TDP hold		Swing		

=== 1985 ===
1985 Andhra Pradesh Legislative Assembly election: Madugula
Party	Candidate	Votes	%	±%
TDP	Reddi Satyanarayana	46,104	69.7	▲15.8
INC	Kuracha Ramunaidu	17,683	26.7	▼1.5
Independent	Karanam Thrinadharao	1,328	2.0	
Independent	Karanam Thrinadharao	1,328	2.0	
Independent	Pothala Suryanarayana	1,063	1.6	
Majority		28,421	41.8	▲16.8
Turnout		67,962	62.6	▼3.9
TDP hold		Swing		

=== 1983 ===
1983 Andhra Pradesh Legislative Assembly election: Madugula
Party	Candidate	Votes	%	±%
TDP	Reddi Satyanarayana	35,439	53.9	
INC	Boddu Duryanarayana	18,557	28.2	▲0.8
Independent	Jetti Reddi	7,395	11.3	
BJP	Puttu Gangayya	4,332	6.6	
Majority		16,882	25.0	▲24.4
Turnout		67,621	66.5	▼5.3
TDP gain from Independent		Swing		

=== 1978 ===
1978 Andhra Pradesh Legislative Assembly election: Madugula
Party	Candidate	Votes	%	±%
Independent	Kuracha Ramunaidu	19,147	28.0	
INC(I)	Gummala Adinarayana	18,710	27.4	
Independent	Bhumireddy Satyanarayana	12,784	18.7	▼23.68
INC	Kalavathi Boddu	11,405	16.7	▼38.85
JP	Donda Varahalu Dora	6,263	9.2	
Majority		437	0.6	▼12.57
Turnout		71,149	71.8	▲11.72
Independent gain from INC		Swing		

=== 1972 ===
1972 Andhra Pradesh Legislative Assembly election: Madugula
Party	Candidate	Votes	%	±%
INC	Boddu Kalavathi	26,764	55.55	▼15.18
Independent	Bhumireddy Satyanarayana	20,420	42.38	▲13.11
Independent	M. Narasimha Murty	998	2.07	
Majority		6,344	13.17	▼28.29
Turnout		48,182	60.08	▼8.89
INC hold		Swing		

=== 1967 ===
1967 Andhra Pradesh Legislative Assembly election: Madugula
Party	Candidate	Votes	%	±%
INC	R. K. Devi	34,561	70.73	▲47.77
Independent	S. Bhumireddy	14,304	29.27	
Majority		20,257	41.46	▼12.61
Turnout		48,865	68.97	
INC gain from Independent		Swing		

=== 1962 ===
1962 Andhra Pradesh Legislative Assembly election: Madugula
Party	Candidate	Votes	%	±%
Independent	Tenneti Viswanadham	26,478	77.03	▲35.55
INC	Donda Sreeramamurty	7,893	22.96	▼32.95
Majority		18,585	54.07	▲39.64
Turnout		34,371		
Independent gain from PSP		Swing		

=== 1955 ===
1955 Andhra State Legislative Assembly election: Madugula
Party	Candidate	Votes	%	±%
PSP	Donda Sreerama Murty	18,862	55.91	
KMPP	Tenneti Viswanadham	13,993	41.48	
Independent	Poolla Rama Rao	879	2.61	
Majority		4,869	14.43	▲4.68
Turnout		33,734	58.32	▲16.69
PSP gain from KLP		Swing		

=== 1952 ===
1952 Madras Legislative Assembly election: Madugula
Party	Candidate	Votes	%	±%
KLP	Bhojinki Gangayya Naidu	10,525	31.87%	
INC	Ilapakurthy Satyanarayana	7,304	22.12%	22.12%
Independent	Palakurthi Chinna Appa Rao	5,637	17.07%	
Independent	Lekkala Jagannathan Naidu	2,052	6.21%	
Independent	Karri Harasinga Rajoa	2,036	6.17%	
Independent	Chebrolu Venkata Somayajulu	1,839	5.57%	
KMPP	Yellapragada Narasingha Rao	1,830	5.54%	
Independent	Mutyam Parvathesam	1,802	5.46%	
Margin of victory		3,221	9.75%	
Turnout		33,025	41.63%	
Registered electors		79,332		
KLP win (new seat)				

=== See also ===
- List of constituencies of the Andhra Pradesh Legislative Assembly
