= Sirijam =

Village in Andhra Pradesh, India

Coordinates: 17°56′N 82°52′E

Sirijam is a village in Cheedikada mandal, Anakapalli district Andhrapradesh, India.

Location: Longitude- 82°52'10.04"E, Latitude- 17°55'58.81"N

Pincode: 531028
