= Reddi Satyanarayana =

Indian politician (1925–2024)

Member of Legislative Assembly Andhra Pradesh
- In office 1983–2004
- Preceded by: Kuracha Ramu Naidu
- Succeeded by: Karanam Dharmasri
- Constituency: Madugula

Personal details
- Born: 15 June 1925
- Died: 5 November 2024 (aged 99) Pedagogada, Anakapalli district, Andhra Pradesh, India

Reddi Satyanarayana (15 June 1925 – 5 November 2024) was an Indian politician who served as Member of the Legislative Assembly from Madugula Constituency in the Legislative Assembly of Andhra Pradesh state, from 1983 to 2004. His served as a member of the Telugu Desam Party (TDP) until his defeat in the election of 2004.

== Life and career ==
Satyanarayana was born on 15 June 1925. He won Assembly elections from the Madugula constituency as a TDP candidate in 1984, 1985, 1989, 1994 and 1999. He lost the contest in that constituency in 2004 -when he stood as a candidate of the Praja Rajam Party.

He served as Cabinet minister for Animal Husbandry and Fisheries and was also a TTD Board Member, deputy leader of the TDLP under Nara Chandrababu Naidu.

Satyanarayana died in Pedagogada, Anakapalli district, on 5 November 2024, at the age of 99.
