= Karanam Dharmasri =

Indian politician

Member of Legislative Assembly Andhra Pradesh
- In office 2019–2024
- Preceded by: KSNS Raju
- Succeeded by: KSNS Raju
- Constituency: Chodavaram
- In office 2004–2009
- Preceded by: Reddi Satyanarayana
- Succeeded by: Gavireddi Rama Naidu
- Constituency: Madugula

Karanam Dharmasri (born 1969) is an Indian politician from Andhra Pradesh. He was a two time MLA from Chodavaram Assembly constituency in the erstwhile Visakhapatnam district.

== Early life and education ==
Dharmasri hails from an agricultural family. His father Visvanadham is a farmer. After completing his graduation in Arts in 1989, he did B.Ed. in 1993. In between, he did his Bachelor of Law from Andhra University and passed out in 1992. He married Venkata Vijayalaxmi. In June 2022, he was selected for a government teacher post, 24 years after he attended an interview because of legal delays in appointments.

== Career ==
Dharmasri was elected to the Andhra Pradesh Legislative Assembly in 2004 from Madugula representing Indian National Congress. Later, he lost the 2009 election from Chodavaram on a Congress ticket and 2014 election by a narrow margin of 909 votes, on YSRCP ticket. He won the 2019 Andhra Pradesh Legislative Assembly Election on YSRCP ticket from Chodavaram constituency in the erstwhile Visakhapatnam district and present Anakapalli district. He defeated Kalidindi Surya Naga Sanyasi Raju of Telugu Desam Party by a huge margin of 27,637 votes.

He was appointed government whip in July 2022. Later, in October 2022, he resigned as MLA citing support to the three-city capitals which is being opposed by TDP. However, after some deliberations, he was nominated again by YSR Congress party to contest the 2024 Andhra Pradesh Legislative Assembly election from Chodavaram. But he lost the Chodavaram seat to his old foe, Sanyasi Raju of TDP by a margin of 42,189 votes.
