= Kalidindi Suryana Naga Sanyasi Raju =

Indian politician

Member of Legislative Assembly, Andhra Pradesh
- Incumbent
- Assumed office 2024
- Preceded by: Karanam Dharmasri
- Constituency: Chodavaram

Personal details
- Party: Telugu Desam Party

Kalidindi Suryana Naga Sanyasi Raju is an Indian politician from Andhra Pradesh. He is a member of Telugu Desam Party. He has been elected as the Member of the Legislative Assembly representing the Chodavaram Assembly constituency in 2024 Andhra Pradesh Legislative Assembly elections.
