= Raiwada Reservoir =

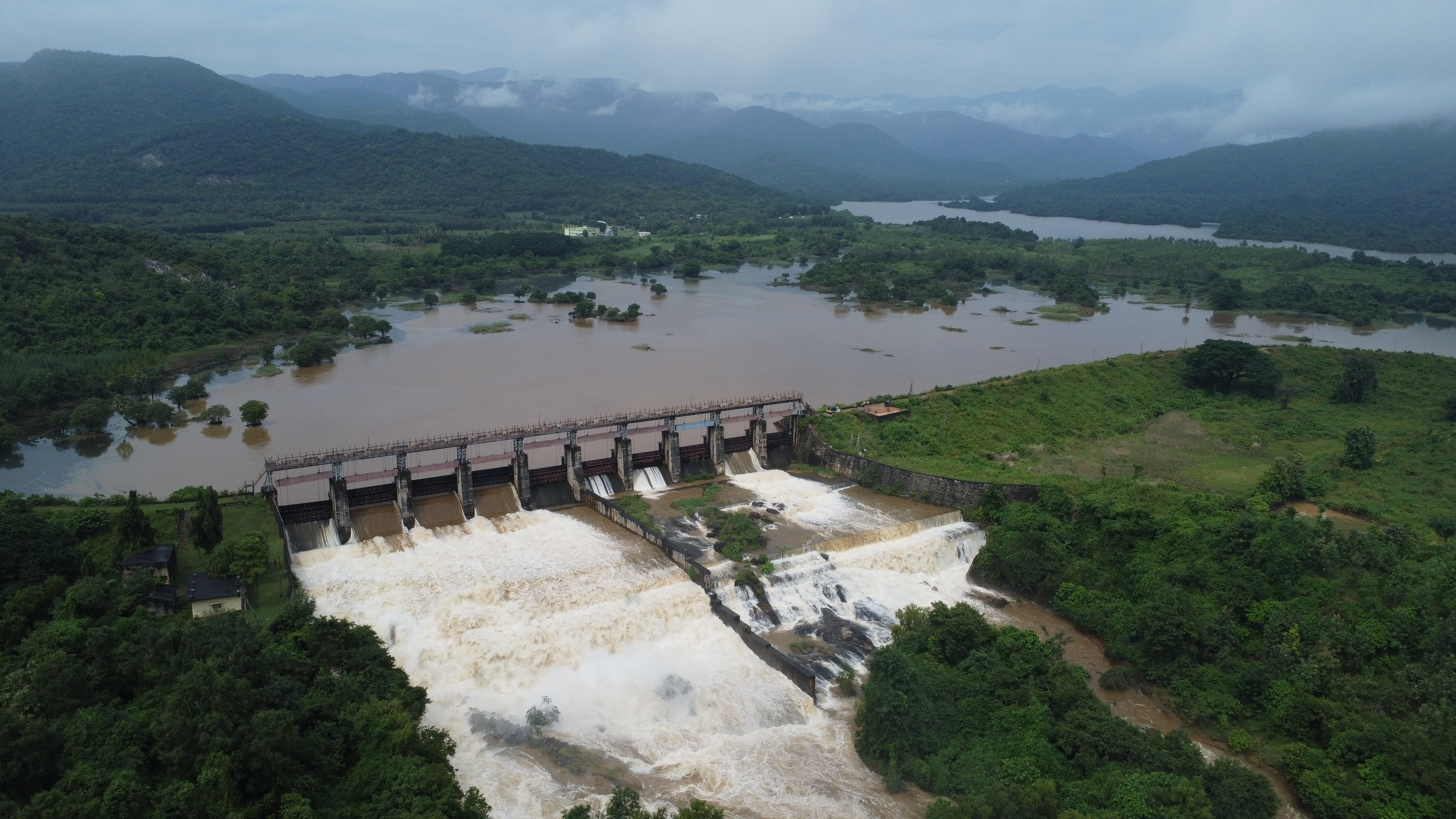
- Aerial view of reservoir and dam

- Location of Raiwada reservoir in Andhra Pradesh
- Official name: Sri Varada Narayana Murty Raiwada Reservoir Project
- Country: India
- Location: Devarapalli, Anakapalli, Andhra Pradesh
- Coordinates: 18.019092°N 82.983007°E
- Purpose: Irrigation, water supply
- Status: Operational
- Construction began: 1981
- Opening date: 1982
- Owner: Government of Andhra Pradesh

Dam and spillways
- Impounds: Sarada River
- Length: 5,750 m (18,860 ft)

Reservoir
- Total capacity: 102 MCM
- Active capacity: 92.7 MCM
- Inactive capacity: 9.20 MCM

Sri Varada Narayana Murty Raiwada Reservoir Project or Raiwada Reservoir is a reservoir constructed across the Sarada River near Raiwada village, Devarapalli mandal, Anakapalli district, 58 km from Visakhapatnam city. It is one of the main water sources for Visakhapatnam city. Its capacity is 2,360 tcm, and it is maintained by Irrigation & CAD Dept.

== History ==
The Raiwada reservoir was discussed in 1962 legislative assembly debate and was estimated to cost ₹1.1 Crore, equivalent to ₹96 Crore in 2024. It was again discussed in 1964 as an important project which would help meet the water requirements of the soon to be set up of Visakhapatnam Steel Plant and the Hindustan Shipyard, along with the Meghadri Gedda Reservoir. The Raiwada Reservoir Scheme was included in the third five-year plan, and the project was constructed during 1981-82. It was argued in a 1997 article titled "Water for the Rich" in Economic and Political Weekly that GVMC prioritised water supply for industries by supplying 125 lakh gallons to industries while only 97 lakh gallons per day were available for domestic consumption.

== Canals ==
The main canal passes through Devarapalli, Vepada, K.Kotapadu, Sabbavaram, and transports water from the reservoir to a filtration plant in Narava for drinking water requirements of Visakhapatnam. The total length of canals is 68 Km. In 2019, GVMC spent ₹1.96 crore to draw water from dead storage due to water shortages in summer.

== Proposed hydroelectric projects ==
In 2023, the Government of Andhra Pradesh has approved two large-scale pumped storage hydroelectric projects around the Raiwada reservoir proposed by Adani Green Energy through its subsidiaries. The social consequences of these projects have led to considerable debate and opposition. Surveys in affected villages were met with resistance from locals and several protests were organised. Civil society organisations allege violations of the PESA and FRA Acts, lack of informed consent and transparency, and fears of tribal displacement and environmental harm.

=== Pedakota Pumped Storage Project ===
The Pedakota PSP, initially approved for 1000 MW capacity in 2023, was later revised to 1800 MW (6x300 MW) in 2025. It is proposed to be built near Pedakota, Dayarti and Madrebu villages in Ananthagiri mandal by utilising water from the Tamutapu Gedda which joins the Sarada river downstream. The requested water allocation for this project is 16.547 MCM.

=== Raiwada Close Loop Pumped Storage Project ===
The Raiwada PSP, revised from 600 MW to 900 MW capacity, is being developed near Marika and Sammeda villages in Vepada and Devarapalli mandals of Vizianagaram and Anakapalli districts respectively. The upper dam for this project is planned to be near Marika village, which is situated in the Marika Reserved Forest and lower dam near Sammeda village. The requested allocations are 832 acres of land and 23 MCM of water from the Sarada river.

== Gallery ==
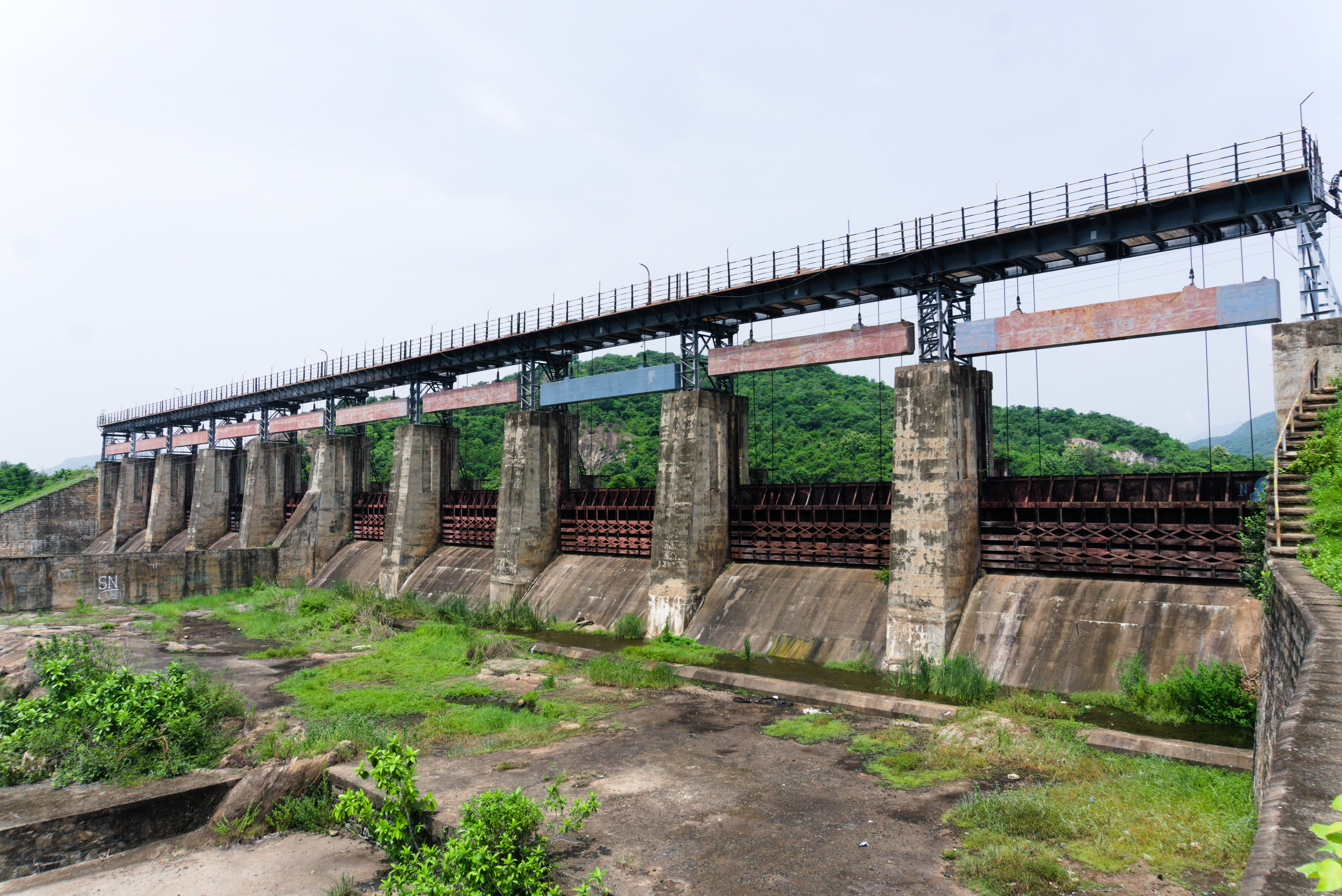
Dam and gates

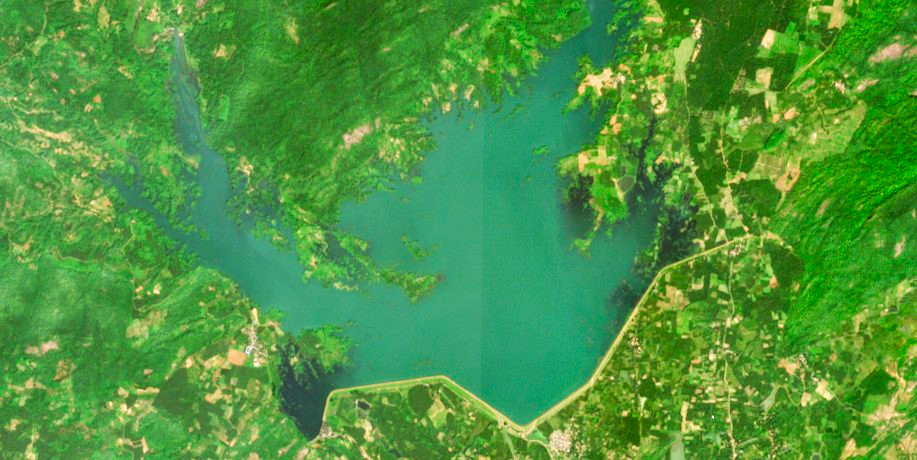
As seen from space

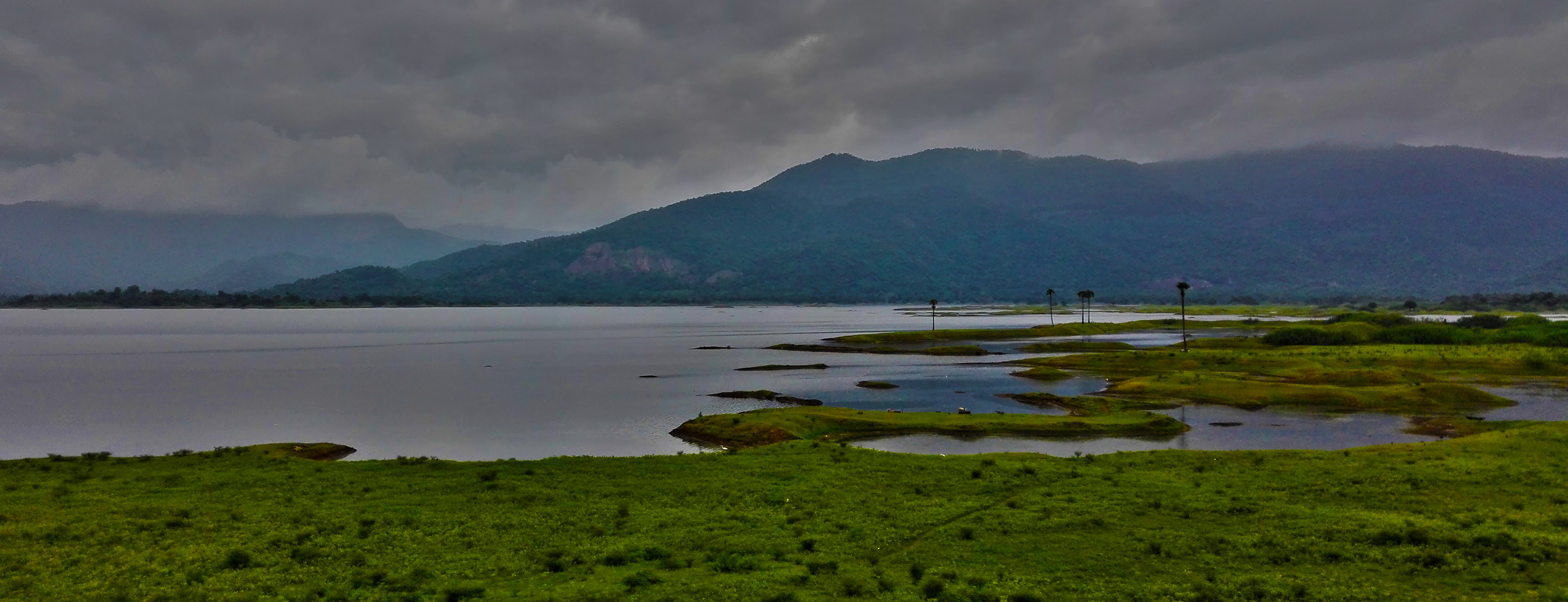
View on a cloudy day

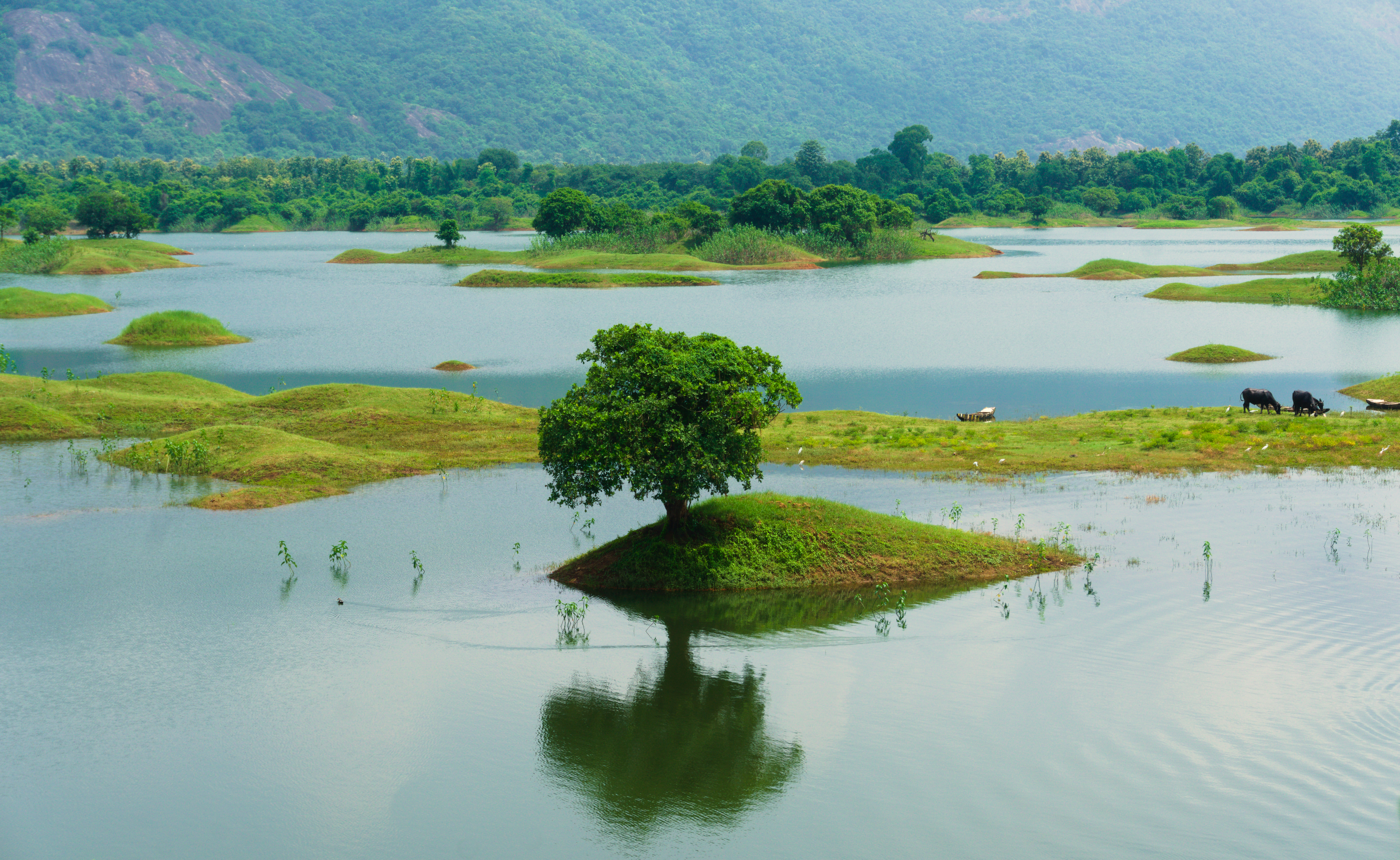
A tree in Raiwada reservoir

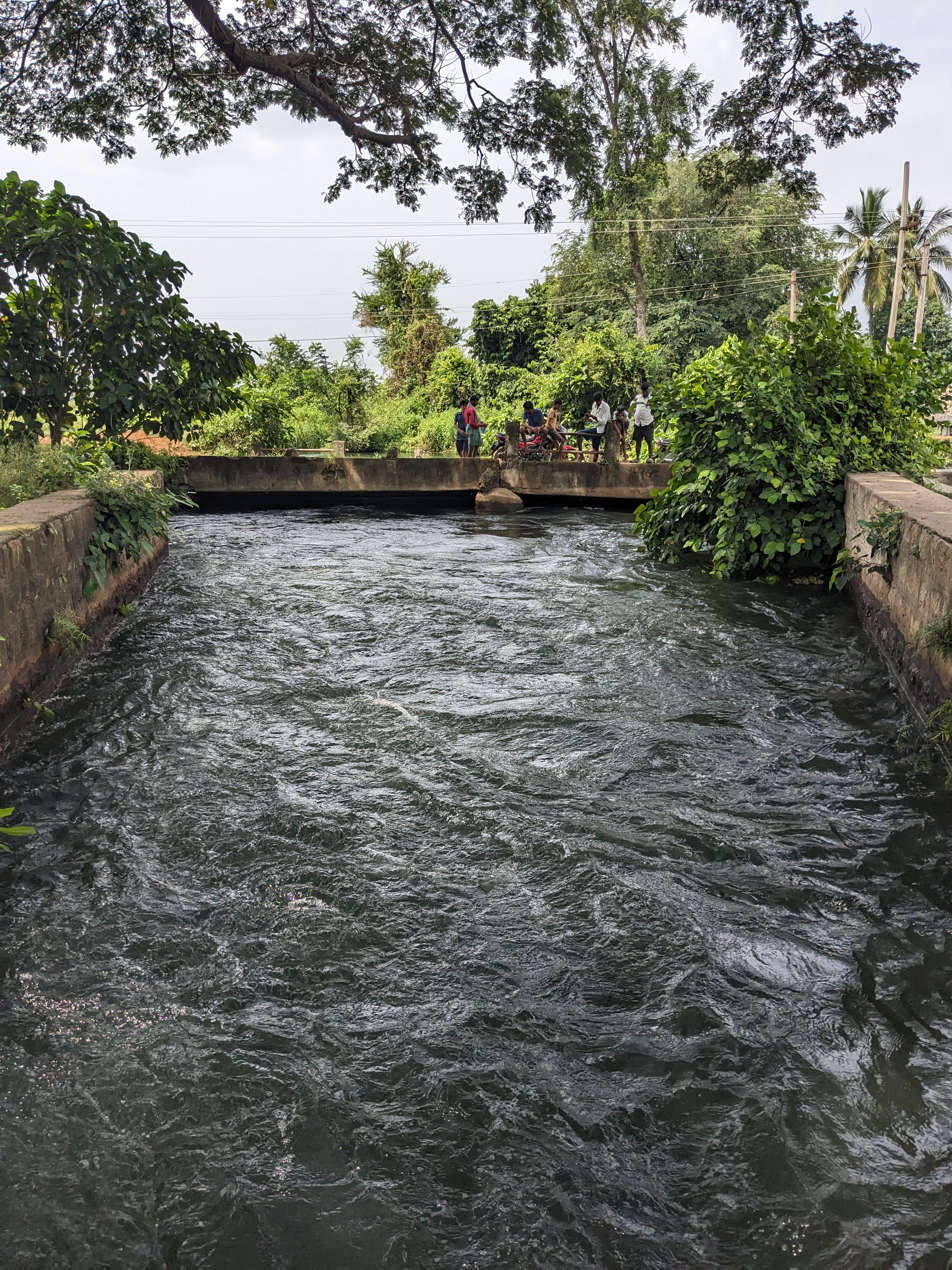
Main canal outflow

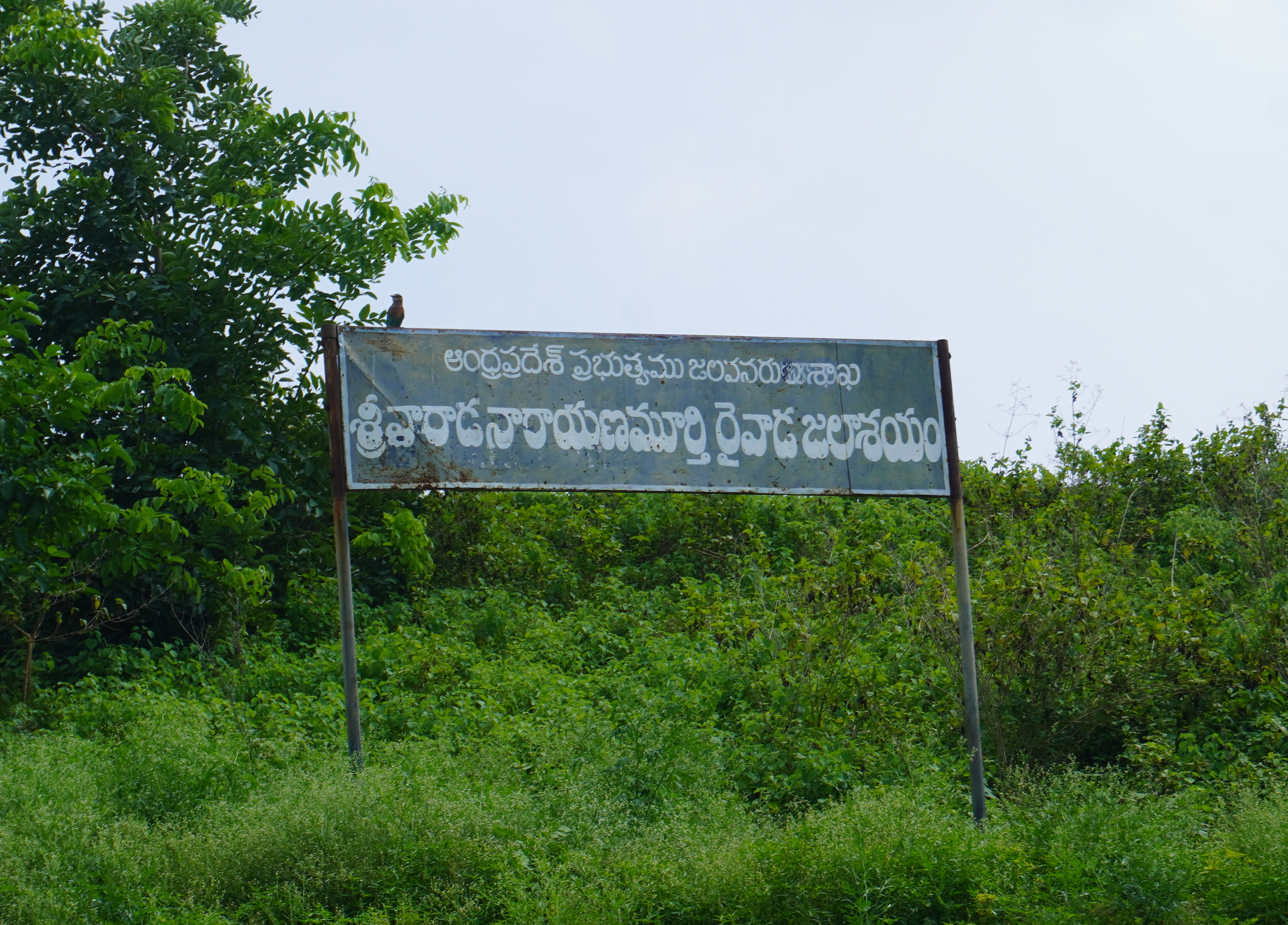
Nameboard of the reservoir

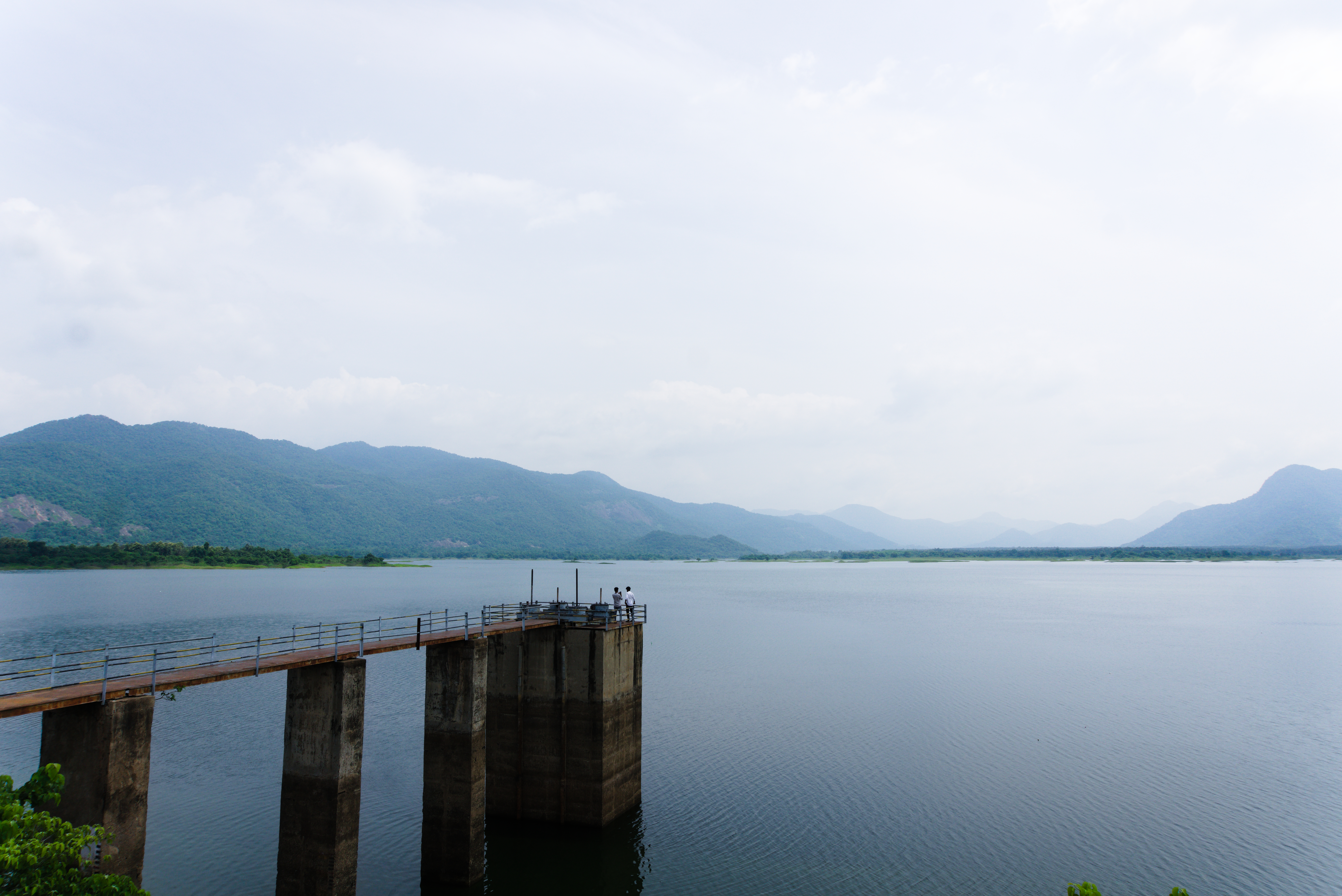
Raiwada reservoir and a sluice gate bridge.
