= Balireddy Satya Rao =

Indian politician (died 2019)

Minor Irrigation Minister of Andhra Pradesh Government
- In office 1992–1994

Andhra Pradesh Legislative Assembly
- In office 1989–1994
- Preceded by: Gunuru Yerrunaidu
- Succeeded by: Gunuru Yerrunaidu
- Constituency: Chodavaram
- In office 1999–2004
- Preceded by: Gunuru Yerrunaidu
- Succeeded by: Ganta Srinivasa Rao
- Constituency: Chodavaram

Personal details
- Died: September 27, 2019
- Party: YSR Congress Party

Balireddy Satya Rao was an Indian politician belonging to YSR Congress Party. He was a minister of Andhra Pradesh Government and legislator of the Andhra Pradesh Legislative Assembly.

== Biography ==
Satya Rao was elected as a legislator of the Andhra Pradesh Legislative Assembly from Chodavaram as an Indian National Congress candidate in 1989. He served as Minor Irrigation Minister of Andhra Pradesh from 1992 to 1994. He was elected again from Chodavaram in 1999. He joined YSR Congress Party in 2013.

Satya Rao died in a road accident on 27 September 2019.
