= Butchayyapeta =

- Mandal
- Interactive map of Butchayyapeta
- Location in Andhra Pradesh, India Butchayyapeta (India)
- Coordinates: 17°47′14″N 82°52′37″E
- Country: India
- State: Andhra Pradesh
- District: Anakapalli

Area
  - Total: 6.77 km^{2} (2.61 sq mi)

Population (2011)
  - Total: 4,405
  - Density: 651/km^{2} (1,690/sq mi)

Languages
  - Official: Telugu
- Time zone: UTC+5:30 (IST)
- PIN: 531026
- Vehicle Registration: AP31 (Former); AP39 (from 30 January 2019)

Butchayyapeta is a Mandal in Anakapalli district of the Indian state of Andhra Pradesh. It is located in Butchayyapeta mandal of Anakapalli revenue division.

== Demographics ==
As of 2011 census, Butchayyapeta had a population of 4,405. The total population constitute, 2,210 males and 2,195 females —a sex ratio of 993 females per 1000 males. 532 children are in the age group of 0–6 years, of which 270 are boys and 262 are girls. The average literacy rate stands at 44.88% with 1,738 literates, significantly lower than the state average of 67.41%.
