= Cheedikada =

- Village
- Interactive map of Cheedikada
- Location in Andhra Pradesh, India
- Coordinates: 17.92864°N 82.892339°E
- Country: India
- State: Andhra Pradesh
- District: Anakapalli

Languages
  - Official: Telugu
- Time zone: UTC+5:30 (IST)
- PIN: 531028
- Vehicle Registration: AP31 (Former); AP39 (from 30 January 2019)

Cheedikada is a village in Anakapalli district in the state of Andhra Pradesh in India.
