= Ravikamatham =

- Village
- Interactive map of Ravikamatham
- Coordinates: 17°47′35″N 82°48′02″E
- Country: India
- State: Andhra Pradesh
- District: Anakapalli

Government
  - Type: mandal parshedh

Population
  - Total: 5,000

Languages
  - Official: Telugu
- Time zone: UTC+5:30 (IST)
- Postal code: 531025
- Vehicle Registration: AP31 (Former); AP39 (from 30 January 2019)

Ravikamatham is a village and headquarters of Ravikamatham mandal in Anakapalli district in the state of Andhra Pradesh in India.
