= Meghadri Gedda Reservoir =

Water Reservoir in Visakhapatnam, India

- Sri Dronam Raju Satyanarayana Reservoir Scheme
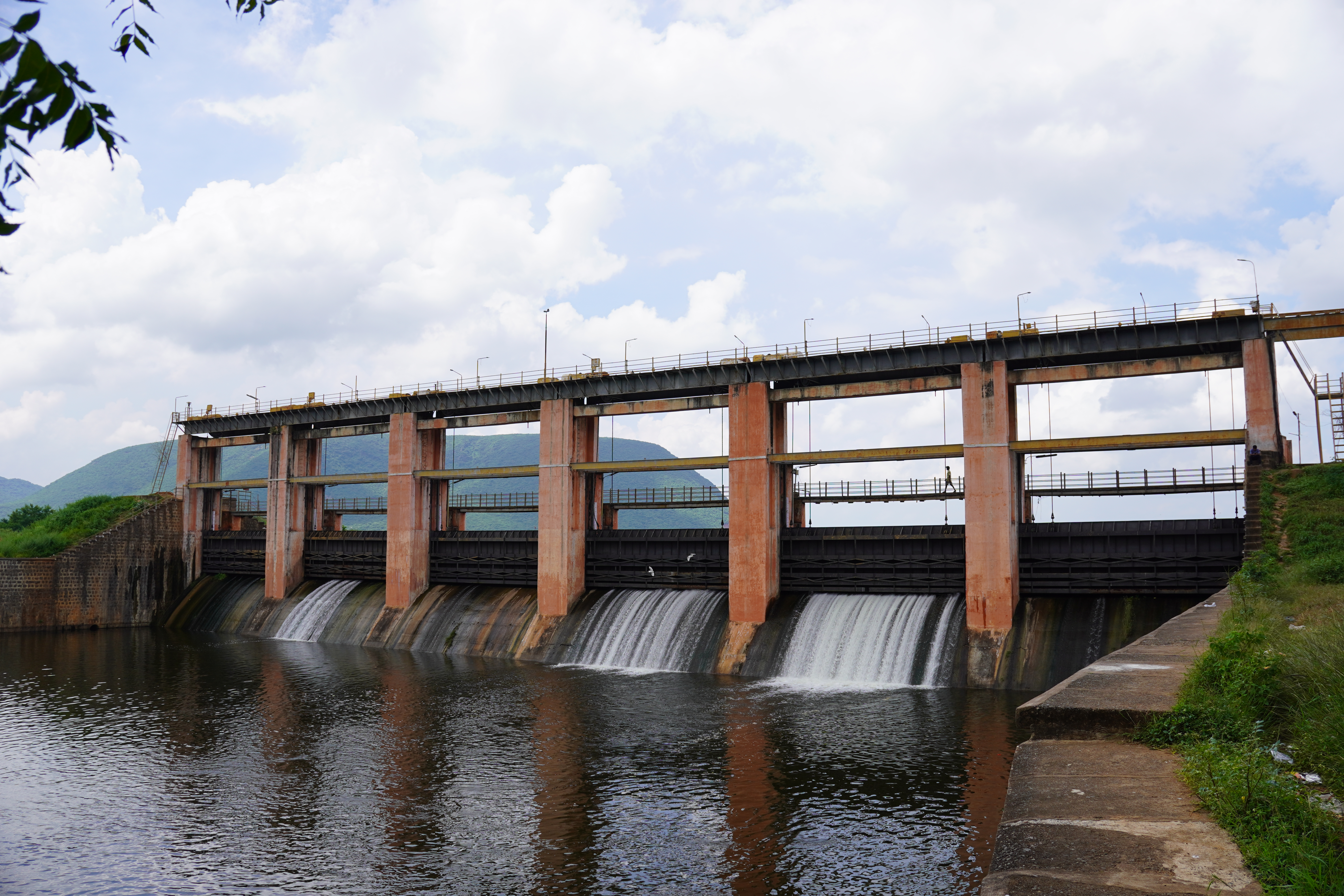
- Meghadri Gedda dam

- Location within Visakhapatnam
- Location: Visakhapatnam, India
- Coordinates: 17.771376°N 83.183766°E
- Type: reservoir
- Managing agency: Greater Visakhapatnam Municipal Corporation

Meghadri Gedda Reservoir, officially "Sri Dronam Raju Satyanarayana Reservoir Scheme" is a reservoir and dam in Visakhapatnam, India. It is one of the main water sources of the Visakhapatnam city. Its capacity is 11 MGD and it is maintained by Greater Visakhapatnam Municipal Corporation.

== History ==
It was discussed in 1964 state assembly debates as an important project which would help meet the water requirements of the soon to be set up Visakhapatnam Steel Plant, the Hindustan Shipyard, the then Bengal Nagpur Railway, together with the Raiwada Reservoir. The project is named after Dronamraju Satyanarayana, a Congress politician from Visakhapatnam and was inaugurated on 27 September 1977 by the then chief minister of Andhra Pradesh, Jalagam Vengala Rao. The estimated expenditure was ₹6.3 crore (equivalent to ₹183 crore or $22M USD in 2024) out of which ₹3.29 crore was spent on reservoir works and ₹1.37 Cr for acquiring 2,716 acres (11 sqkm) of land and another ₹1.37 for public health related expenditures.

== Location ==
The reservoir situated between Pendurthi, Sabbavaram, and Gopalapatnam. Its eastern edge parallels the Howrah–Chennai main line and mountains of Sabbavaram and Vepagunta surround the water body.

== Geography ==
The Vaaluteeru rivulet is the primary water source for the reservoir with several other streams from the nearby Kothavalasa, Pendurthi, Simhachalam, and other areas draining into it. The Vaaluteru gets its name from the Telugu words Vaalu (its shape) and Eeru (stream) which later came to be Waltair. These together make up the Meghadri "Gedda" (drain) which joins the Bay of Bengal at the Dolphin Hill near Visakhapatnam Port. The construction of the dam and the development of Airport and the Harbour has dried up several streams which used to pass through the city.

== Power generation ==
A floating solar power plant of 3MW capacity has been commissioned on 22 July 2022 which saves 12 acres of land area and reduces evaporation at a cost of Rs.14 crore. This project was part of the Asian Development Bank's Visakhapatnam–Chennai Industrial Corridor Development Program and the "Urban climate change resilience trust fund".

== Gallery ==
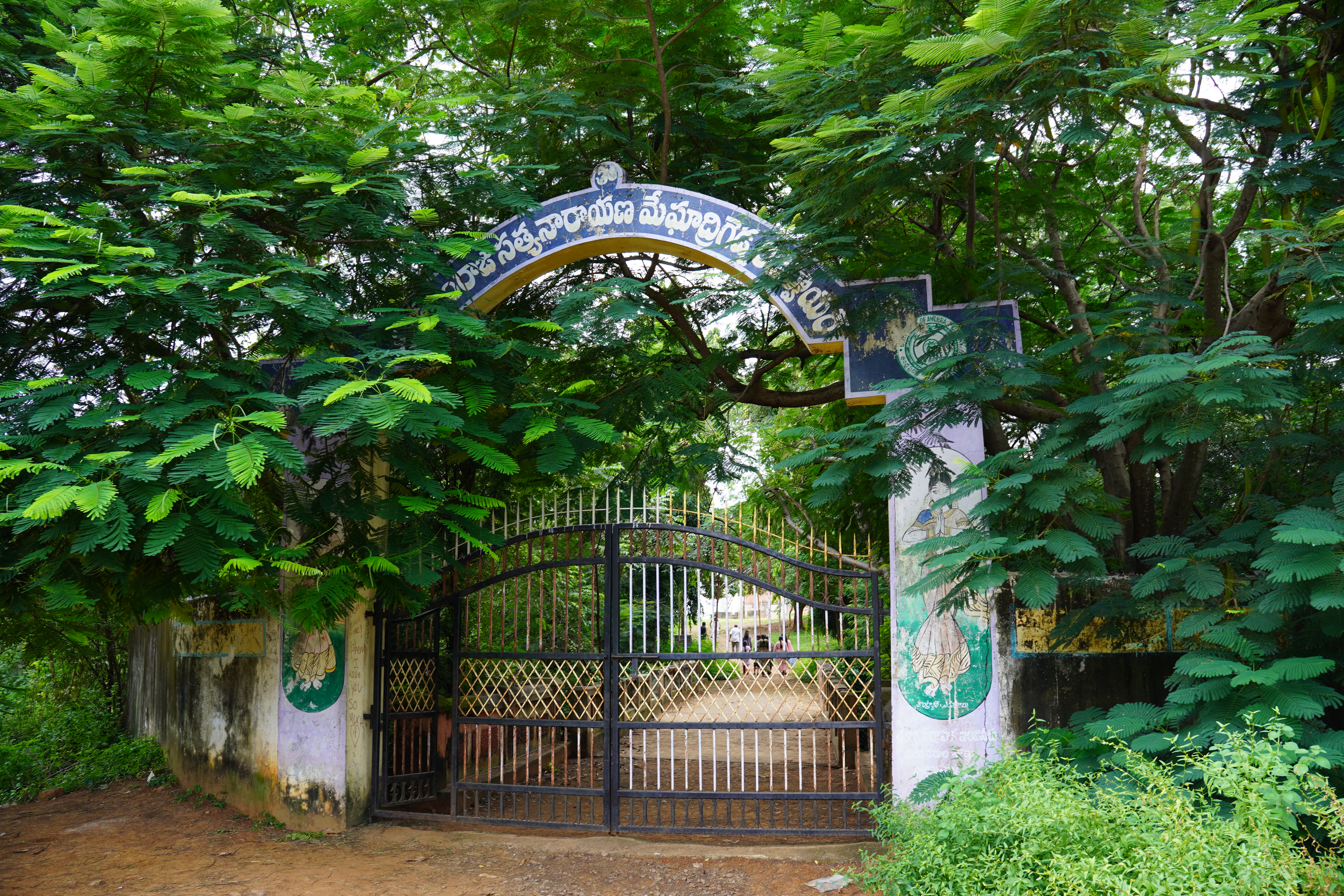
Entrance of the reservoir

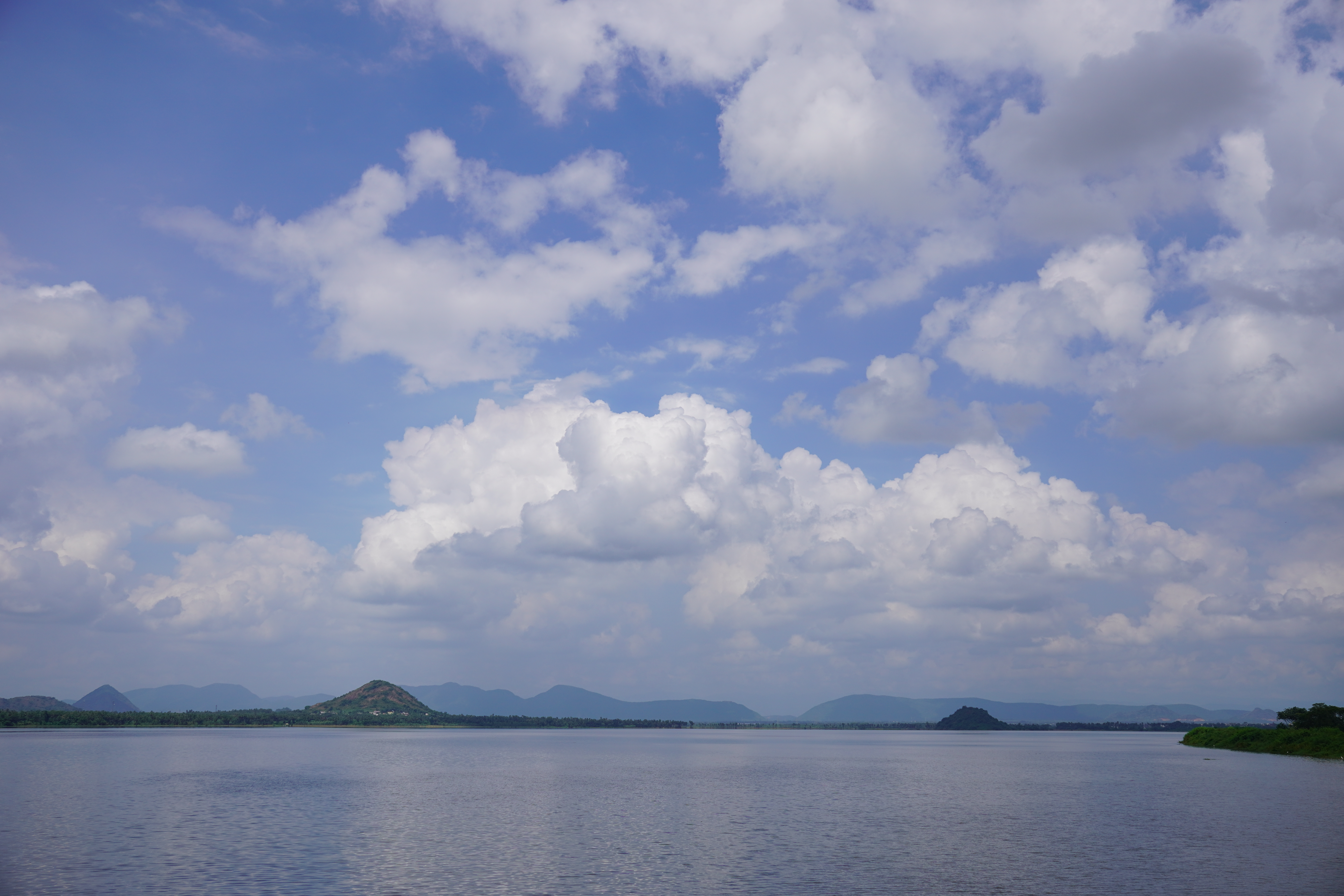
View of the reservoir on a cloudy day

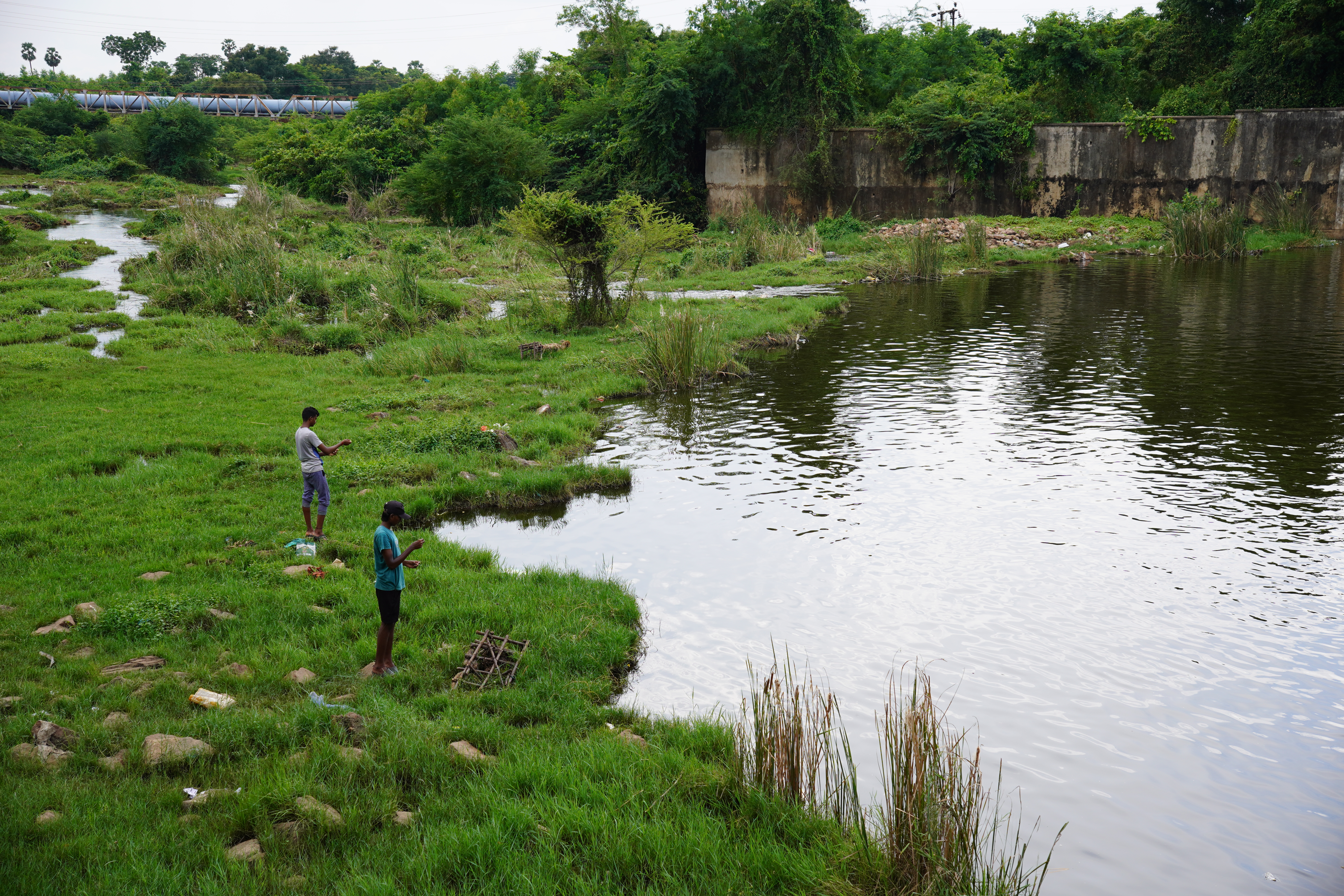
People fishing downstream

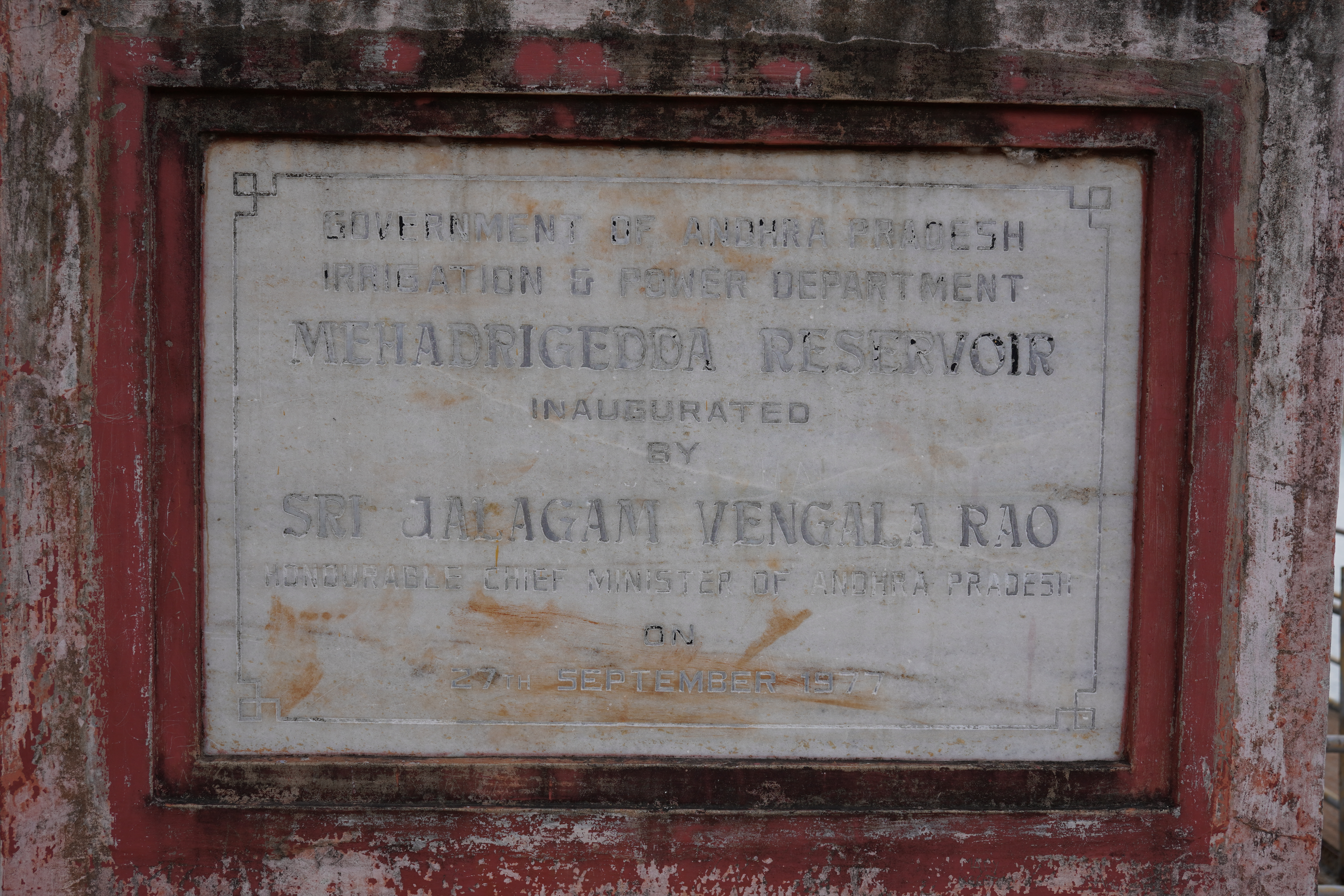
Foundation stone of reservoir

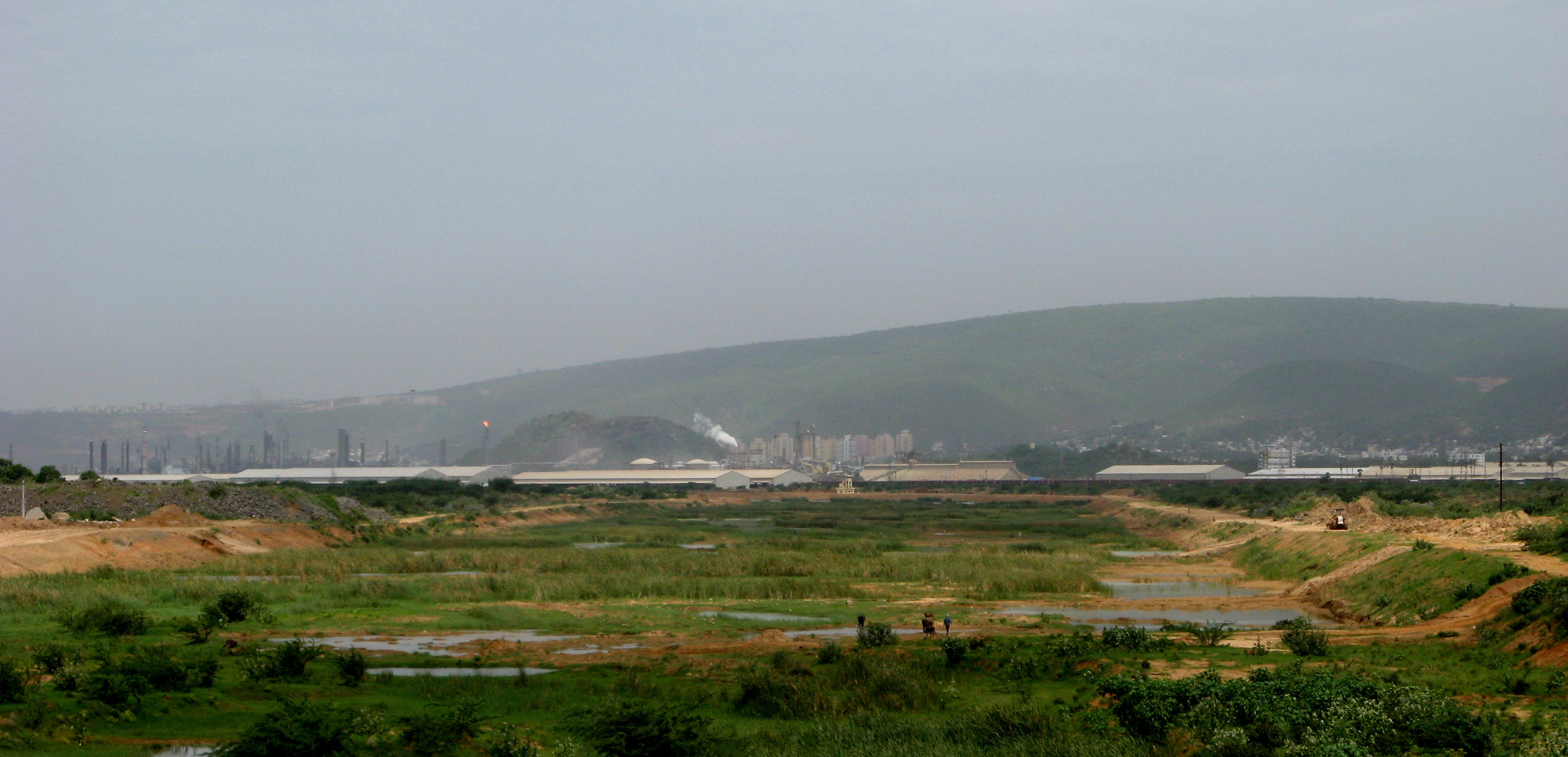
Meghadri gedda river beside INS Dega

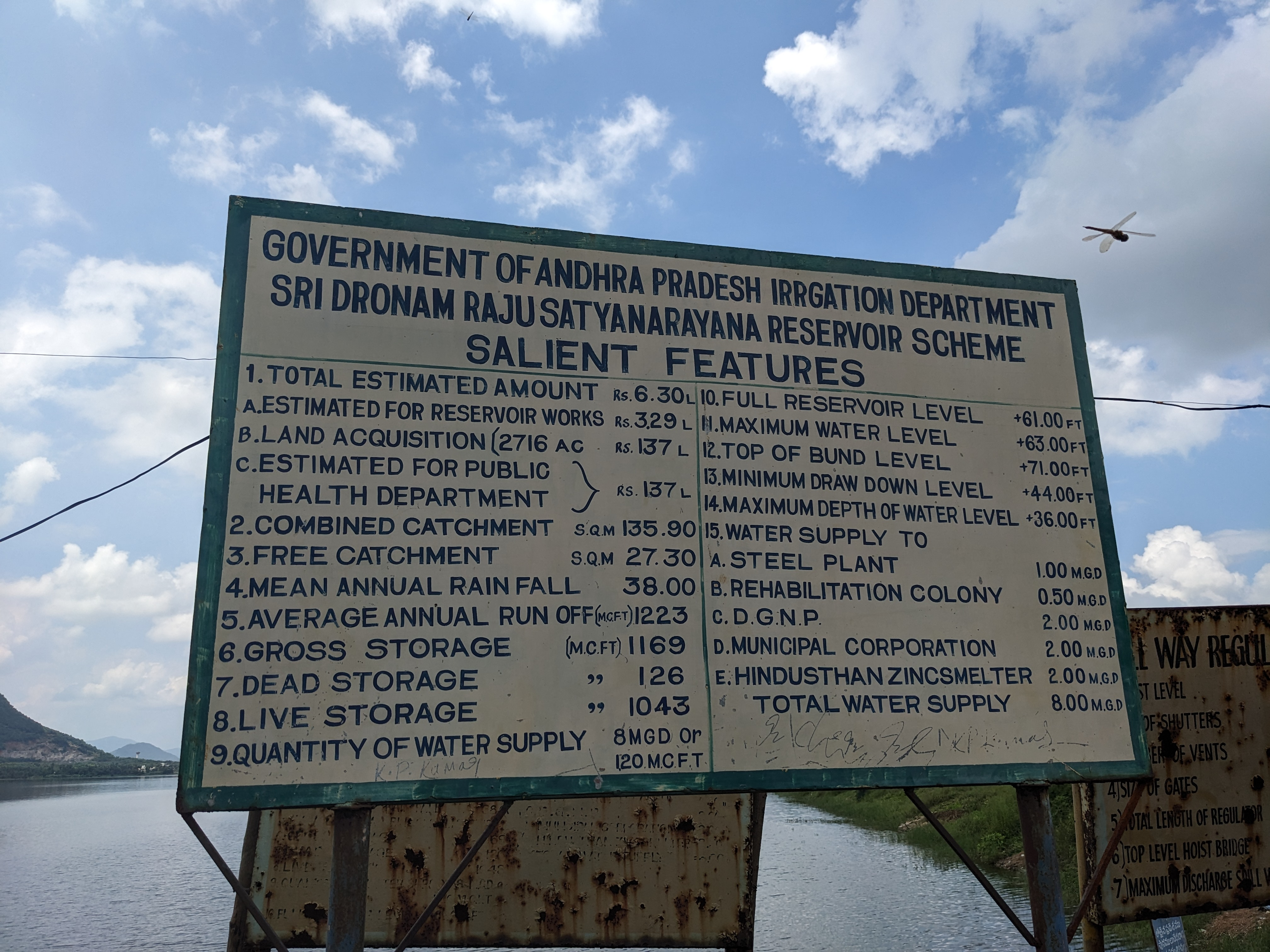
Meghadri Reservoir Information board with estimated costs and other specifications.

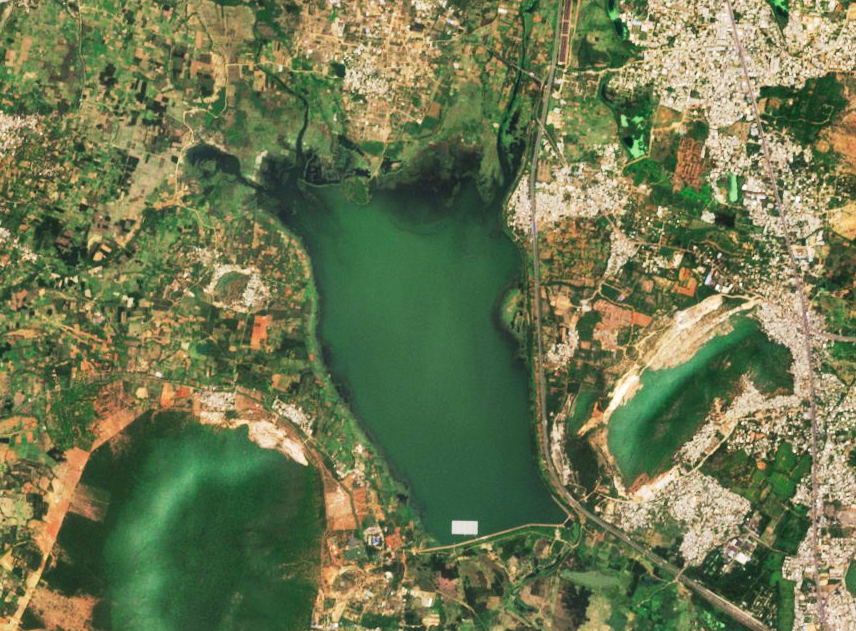
Satellite imagery of the reservoir. Floating solar panels can be seen.

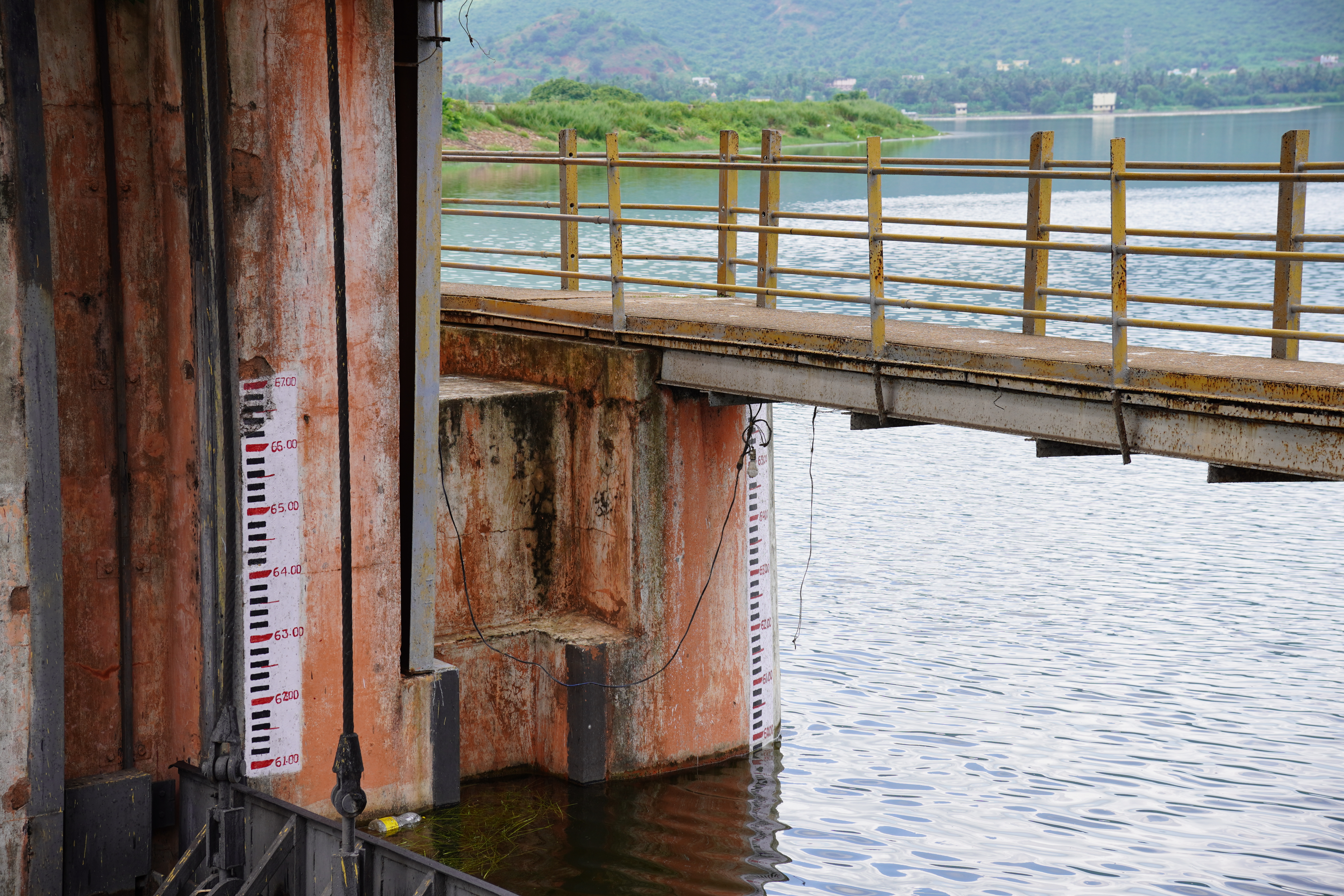
Water level indicator scale at the gate

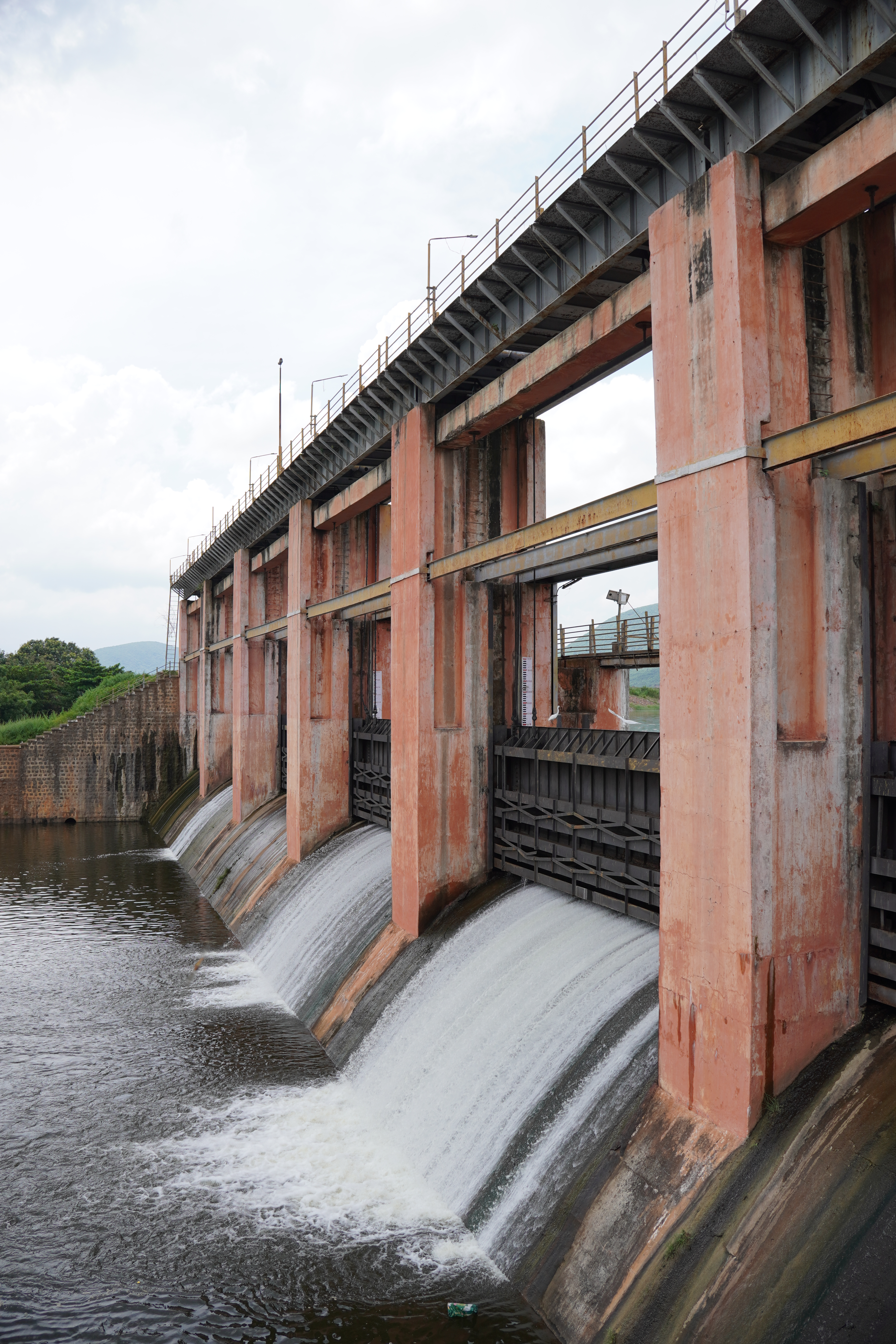
Side view of the gates and water flow
