= Devarapalli, Anakapalli district =

Devarapalli
- Village
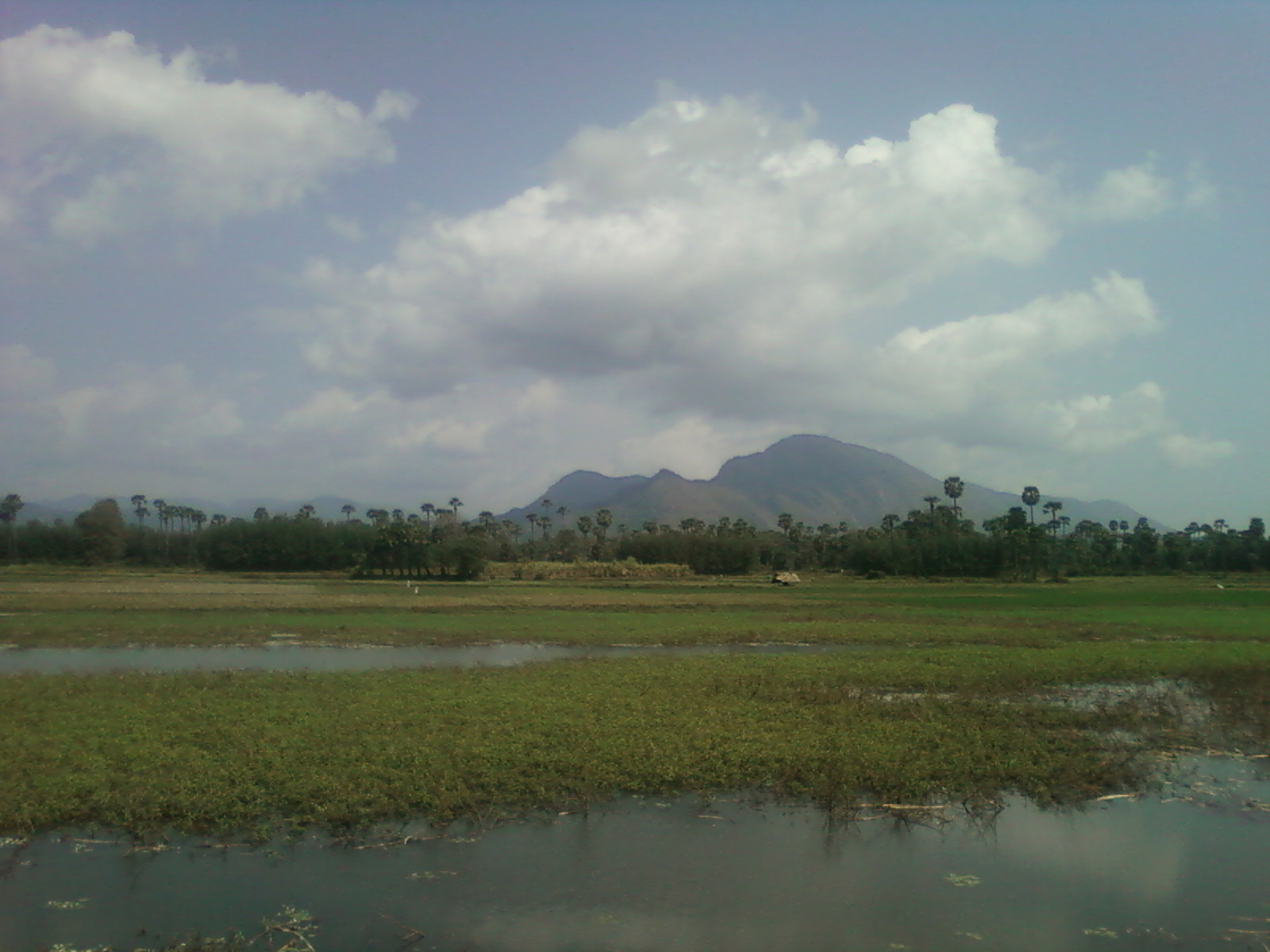
- Fields near Devarapalli of Visakha hidistrict
- Interactive map of Devarapalli
- Location in Andhra Pradesh, India
- Coordinates: 17°59′19″N 82°58′52″E
- Country: India
- State: Andhra Pradesh
- District: Anakapalli

Languages
  - Official: Telugu
- Time zone: UTC+5:30 (IST)
- Postal code: 531030
- Vehicle Registration: AP31 (Former); AP39 (from 30 January 2019)

Devarapalli is a village and a Mandal headquarter in Anakapalli district in the state of Andhra Pradesh in India.
