= Elamanchili Assembly constituency =

Constituency of the Andhra Pradesh Legislative Assembly, India

Coordinates: 17.55°N 82.85°E

Elamanchili
- Constituency No. 32 for the Andhra Pradesh Legislative Assembly
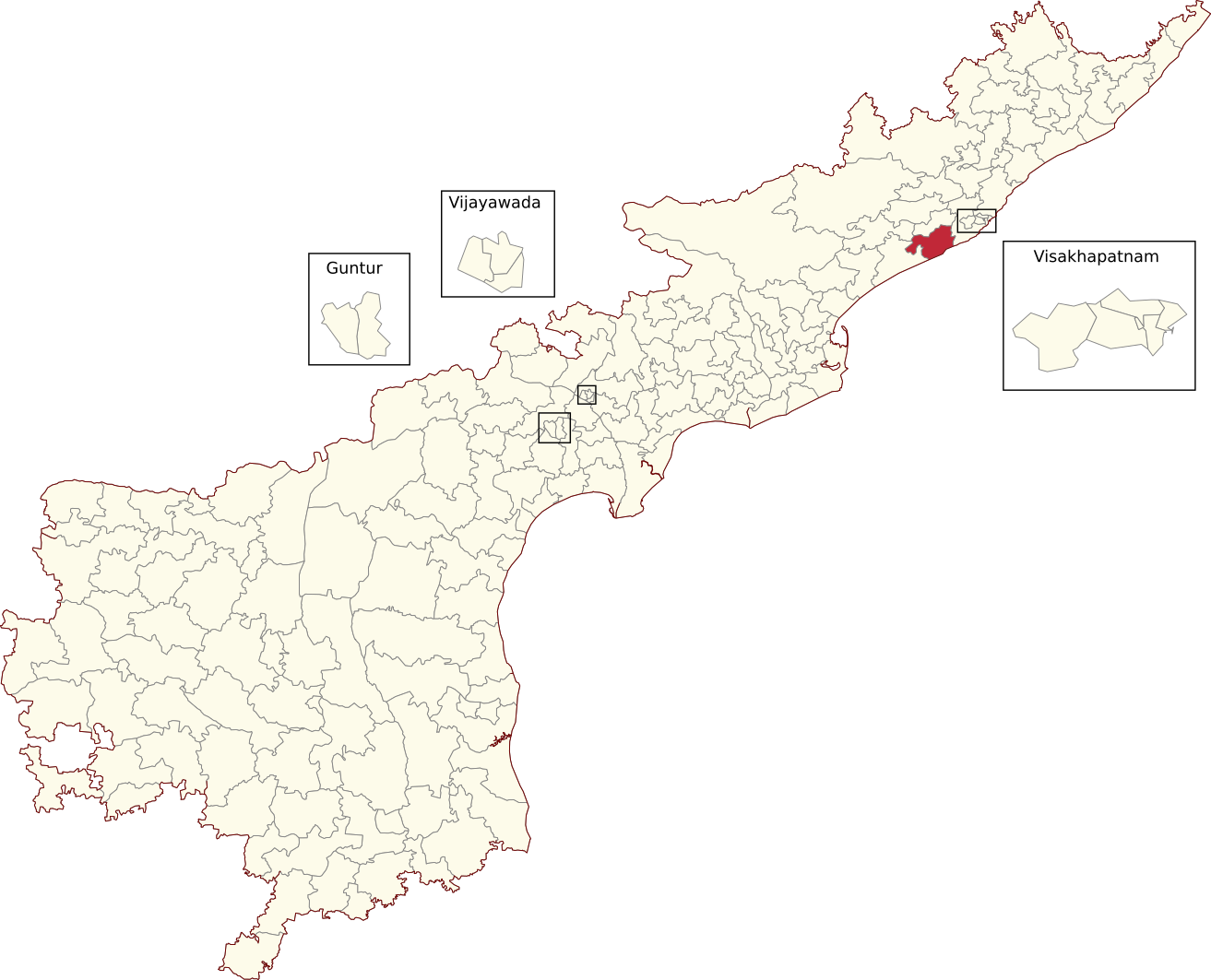
- Location of Elamanchili Assembly constituency within Andhra Pradesh

Constituency details
- Country: India
- Region: South India
- State: Andhra Pradesh
- District: Anakapalli
- Lok Sabha constituency: Anakapalli
- Established: 1951
- Total electors: 197,602
- Reservation: None

Member of Legislative Assembly
- 16th Andhra Pradesh Legislative Assembly
- Incumbent Sundarapu Vijay Kumar
- Party: JSP
- Alliance: NDA
- Elected year: 2024

Elamanchili Assembly constituency is a constituency in Anakapalli district of Andhra Pradesh that elects representatives to the Andhra Pradesh Legislative Assembly in India. It is one of the seven assembly segments of Anakapalli Lok Sabha constituency.

Kanna Babu (Uppalapati Venkata Ramanamurti Raju) is the current MLA of the constituency, having won the 2019 Andhra Pradesh Legislative Assembly election from YSR Congress Party. As of 2019, there are a total of 197,602 electors in the constituency. The constituency was established in 1951, as per the Delimitation Orders (1951).

== Mandals ==
The four mandals that form the assembly constituency are:

Mandal
Rambilli
Munagapaka
Atchutapuram
Elamanchili

Mandals in Elamanchili Assembly Constituency

== Members of the Legislative Assembly ==
| Year | Member | Political party |
|---|---|---|
| 1952 | Pappala Bapunaidu | Krishikar Lok Party |
| 1955 | Chintalapati Venkata Suryanarayana Raju | Independent |
| 1962 | Veesam Sanyasinaidu | Indian National Congress |
| 1967 | Nagireddi Satyanarayana | Independent |
| 1972 | Kakaralapudi K Venkata | Independent |
| 1978 | Veesam Sanyasinaidu | Indian National Congress |
| 1983 | K. K. V. Satyanarayana Raju | Telugu Desam Party |
| 1985 | Pappala Chalapathirao | Telugu Desam Party |
| 1989 | Pappala Chalapathirao | Telugu Desam Party |
| 1994 | Pappala Chalapathirao | Telugu Desam Party |
| 1999 | Pappala Chalapathirao | Telugu Desam Party |
| 2004 | Kanna Babu (Uppalapati Venkata Ramanamurti Raju) | Indian National Congress |
| 2009 | Kanna Babu (Uppalapati Venkata Ramanamurti Raju) | Indian National Congress |
| 2014 | Panchakarla Ramesh Babu | Telugu Desam Party |
| 2019 | Kanna Babu (Uppalapati Venkata Ramanamurti Raju) | YSR Congress Party |
| 2024 | Sundarapu Vijay Kumar | Janasena Party |

== Election results ==
=== 1952 ===
1952 Madras Legislative Assembly election: Yellamanchili
| Party | Candidate | Votes | % | ±% |
|---|---|---|---|---|
| KLP | Pappala Bapunaiudu | 17,193 | 44.07% | |
| INC | Missule Suryanarayanamoorthy | 11,536 | 29.57% | 29.57% |
| Independent | Orugandi Somasundaram | 10,281 | 26.35% | |
| Margin of victory | | 5,657 | 14.50% | |
| Turnout | | 39,010 | 51.34% | |
| Registered electors | | 75,984 | | |
| KLP win (new seat) | | | | |

=== 1955 ===
1955 Andhra State Legislative Assembly election: Yellamanchili
| Party | Candidate | Votes | % | ±% |
|---|---|---|---|---|
| Independent | Chintalapati Raju | 13,621 | 43.95 | |
| CPI | Kandregula Ramajogi | 9,961 | 32.14 | |
| KLP | Pappala Bapunaidu (incumbent) | 7,408 | 23.90 | ▼20.17 |
| Majority | | 3,660 | 11.81 | ▼2.69 |
| Turnout | | 30,990 | 49.38 | ▼1.96 |
| Independent gain from KLP | | Swing | | |

=== 1962 ===
1962 Andhra Pradesh Legislative Assembly election: Elamanchili
| Party | Candidate | Votes | % | ±% |
|---|---|---|---|---|
| INC | Veesam Sanyasinaidu | 14,992 | 56.87 | |
| CPI | Velaga Veerabhadra Rao | 11,366 | 43.12 | ▲10.98 |
| Majority | | 3,626 | 13.75 | ▲1.94 |
| Turnout | | 26,358 | | |
| INC hold | | Swing | | |

=== 1967 ===
1967 Andhra Pradesh Legislative Assembly election: Elamanchili
| Party | Candidate | Votes | % | ±% |
|---|---|---|---|---|
| Independent | Nagireddi Satyanarayana | 22,994 | 45.15 | |
| INC | Veesam Sanyasinaidu (Incumbent) | 20,639 | 40.52 | ▼16.35 |
| CPI | P.V. Ramana | 7,297 | 14.33 | ▼28.79 |
| Majority | | 2,355 | 4.63 | ▼9.12 |
| Turnout | | 50,930 | 67.82 | |
| Independent gain from INC | | Swing | | |

=== 1972 ===
1972 Andhra Pradesh Legislative Assembly election: Elamanchili
| Party | Candidate | Votes | % | ±% |
|---|---|---|---|---|
| Independent | Kakaralapudi K Venkata | 31,938 | 53.06 | |
| INC | Veesam Sanyasinaidu | 25,390 | 42.18 | ▲1.66 |
| Independent | Koilada Nookaraju | 2,865 | 4.76 | |
| Majority | | 6,548 | 10.88 | ▲6.25 |
| Turnout | | 60,193 | 72.31 | ▲4.49 |
| Independent hold | | Swing | | |

=== 1978 ===
1978 Andhra Pradesh Legislative Assembly election: Elamanchili
| Party | Candidate | Votes | % | ±% |
|---|---|---|---|---|
| INC | Veesam Sanyasinaidu | 37,969 | 52.5 | ▲10.32 |
| JP | Nagireddi Satyanarayana | 28,032 | 40.5 | |
| INC(I) | Akella Srihari | 3,407 | 4.7 | ▼20.7 |
| Independent | Koyilada Nookaraja | 1,712 | 2.4 | ▼2.36 |
| Majority | | 8,667 | 11.6 | ▲0.72 |
| Turnout | | 74,461 | 76.1 | ▲3.79 |
| INC gain from Independent | | Swing | | |

=== 1983 ===
1983 Andhra Pradesh Legislative Assembly election: Elamanchili
| Party | Candidate | Votes | % | ±% |
|---|---|---|---|---|
| TDP | K. K. V. Satyanarayana Raju | 38,707 | 53.8 | |
| INC | Veesam Sanyasinaidu | 30,879 | 43 | ▼9.5 |
| LKD | Ranga Swamy | 1,202 | 1.7 | |
| Independent | Chintalli Salla | 887 | 1.2 | |
| Independent | Koilada Nookaraju | 226 | 0.3 | ▼2.1 |
| Majority | | 7,828 | 10.7 | ▼0.9 |
| Turnout | | 73,378 | 70.5 | ▼5.6 |
| TDP gain from INC | | Swing | | |

=== 1985 ===
1985 Andhra Pradesh Legislative Assembly election: Elamanchili
| Party | Candidate | Votes | % | ±% |
|---|---|---|---|---|
| TDP | Pappala Chalapathirao | 44,597 | 56.3 | |
| INC | Vesam Sanyasi Naidu | 34,677 | 43.7 | ▲0.7 |
| Majority | | 9,920 | 12.2 | ▲1.5 |
| Turnout | | 81,063 | 73.2 | ▲2.7 |
| TDP hold | | Swing | | |

=== 1989 ===
1989 Andhra Pradesh Legislative Assembly election: Elamanchili
| Party | Candidate | Votes | % | ±% |
|---|---|---|---|---|
| TDP | Pappala Chalapathirao | 40,286 | 44.5 | ▼11.8 |
| Independent | Veesam Sanyasi Naidu | 28,032 | 31 | ▼12.7 |
| INC | Raju Kakarlapudi | 20,814 | 23 | ▼20.7 |
| BSP | Bera Samba Murty | 1,431 | 1.6 | |
| Majority | | 12,254 | 12.9 | ▲0.7 |
| Turnout | | 94,654 | 75.6 | ▲2.4 |
| TDP hold | | Swing | | |

=== 1994 ===
1994 Andhra Pradesh Legislative Assembly election: Elamanchili
| Party | Candidate | Votes | % | ±% |
|---|---|---|---|---|
| TDP | Pappala Chalapathirao | 57,793 | 61.1 | ▲16.6 |
| INC | Nagireddi Prabhakararao | 33,547 | 35.5 | ▲12.5 |
| BJP | S.R.K.K.V.K.N. Kotababu | 1,293 | 1.4 | |
| BSP | Pittapurapu Sreeramulu | 978 | 1.0 | ▼0.6 |
| Independent | Koyilada Nookaraju | 523 | 0.6 | |
| Independent | Malla Nookunaidu | 280 | 0.3 | ▲12.5 |
| Independent | Sarakanam Krishnamurthy | 113 | 0.1 | |
| Majority | | 24,246 | 25.1 | ▲12.2 |
| Turnout | | 96,414 | 74.1 | ▼1.5 |
| TDP hold | | Swing | | |

=== 1999 ===
1999 Andhra Pradesh Legislative Assembly election: Elamanchili
| Party | Candidate | Votes | % | ±% |
|---|---|---|---|---|
| TDP | Pappala Chalapathirao | 52,583 | 51.8 | ▼9.3 |
| INC | Raju Uppalapati | 45,529 | 44.8 | ▲9.3 |
| Anna Telugu Desam Party | Sanyasinaidu Veesam | 3,430 | 3.4 | |
| Majority | | 7,054 | 6.8 | ▼18.3 |
| Turnout | | 104,435 | 74.7 | ▲0.6 |
| TDP hold | | Swing | | |

=== 2004 ===
2004 Andhra Pradesh Legislative Assembly election: Elamanchili
| Party | Candidate | Votes | % | ±% |
|---|---|---|---|---|
| INC | Kanna Babu | 54,819 | 51.77 | +6.93 |
| TDP | Gontina Venkata Nageswara Rao | 48,956 | 46.24 | −5.54 |
| Majority | | 5,863 | 5.53 | |
| Turnout | | 105,885 | 81.13 | +8.47 |
| INC gain from TDP | | Swing | | |

=== 2009 ===
2009 Andhra Pradesh Legislative Assembly election: Elamanchili
| Party | Candidate | Votes | % | ±% |
|---|---|---|---|---|
| INC | Kanna Babu | 53,960 | 37.02 | −14.75 |
| PRP | Gonthina Venkata Nageswara Rao | 43,870 | 30.09 | |
| TDP | Lalam Bhaskara Rao | 39,525 | 27.11 | −19.13 |
| Majority | | 10,090 | 6.93 | |
| Turnout | | 145,773 | 83.58 | +2.45 |
| INC hold | | Swing | | |

=== 2014 ===
2014 Andhra Pradesh Legislative Assembly election: Elamanchili
| Party | Candidate | Votes | % | ±% |
|---|---|---|---|---|
| TDP | Panchakarla Ramesh Babu | 80,563 | 50.60 | |
| YSRCP | Pragada Nageswara Rao | 72,188 | 45.34 | |
| Majority | | 8,375 | 5.26 | |
| Turnout | | 159,218 | 85.72 | +2.14 |
| TDP gain from INC | | Swing | | |

=== 2019 ===
2019 Andhra Pradesh Legislative Assembly election: Elamanchili
| Party | Candidate | Votes | % | ±% |
|---|---|---|---|---|
| YSRCP | Kanna Babu | 71,934 | 42.62 | |
| TDP | Panchakarla Ramesh Babu | 67,788 | 40.17 | |
| JSP | Sundarapu Vijay Kumar | 20,074 | 11.72 | |
| Majority | | 4,146 | 2.45 | |
| Turnout | | 1,68,766 | 85.40 | −0.32 |
| YSRCP gain from TDP | | Swing | | |

=== 2024 ===
2024 Andhra Pradesh Legislative Assembly election: Elamanchili
| Party | Candidate | Votes | % | ±% |
|---|---|---|---|---|
| JSP | Sundarapu Vijay Kumar | 109,443 | 61 | |
| YSRCP | Kanna Babu | 60,487 | 33.71 | |
| NOTA | None Of The Above | 2409 | 1.34 | |
| Majority | | 48,956 | 27.28 | |
| Turnout | | 179,427 | | |
| JSP gain from YSRCP | | Swing | | |

== See also ==
- List of constituencies of the Andhra Pradesh Legislative Assembly
