= Gambheeram Reservoir =

Reservoir in Andhra Pradesh, India

Coordinates: 17.876°N 83.347°E

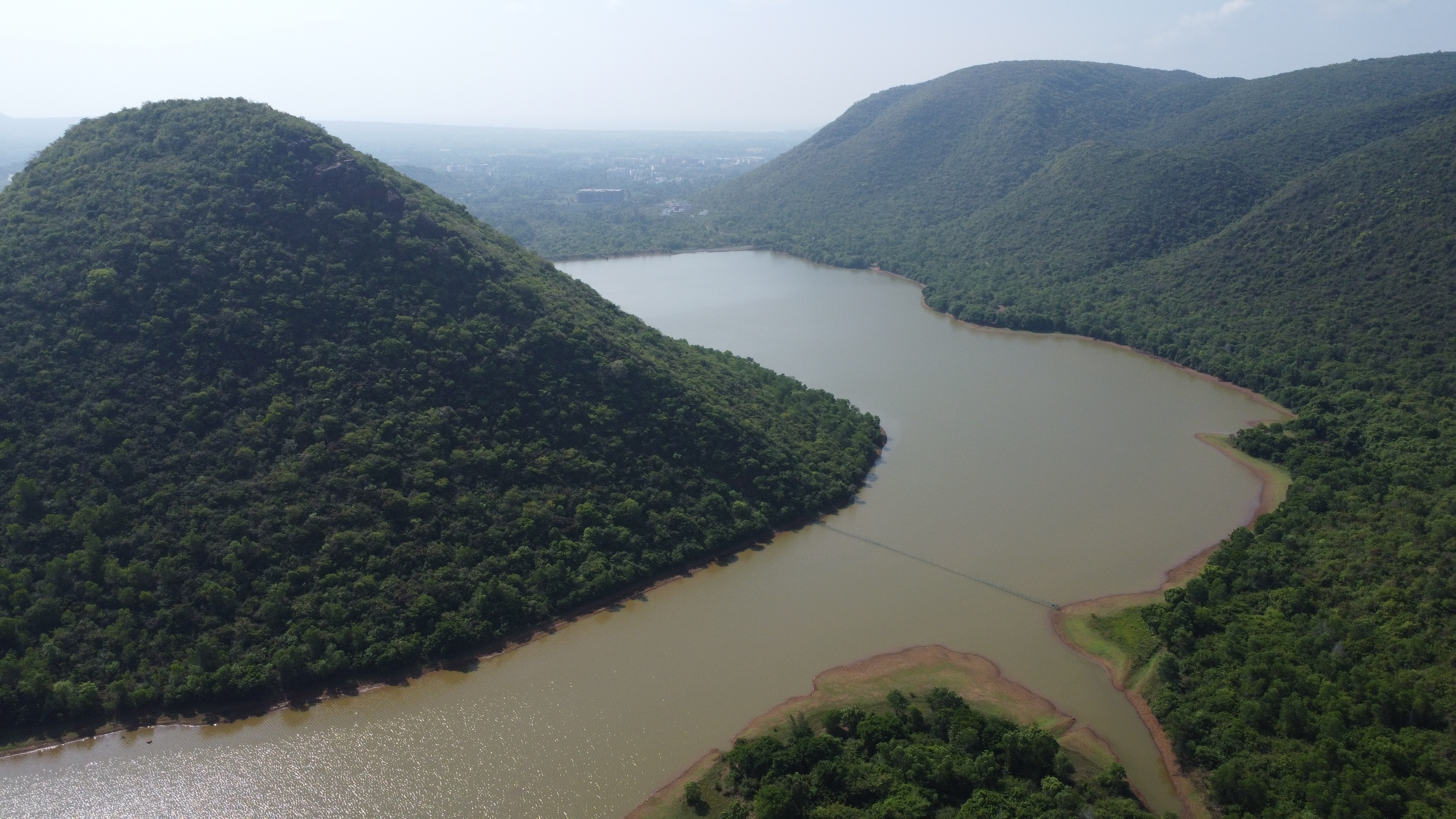
Gambheeram reservoir aerial view

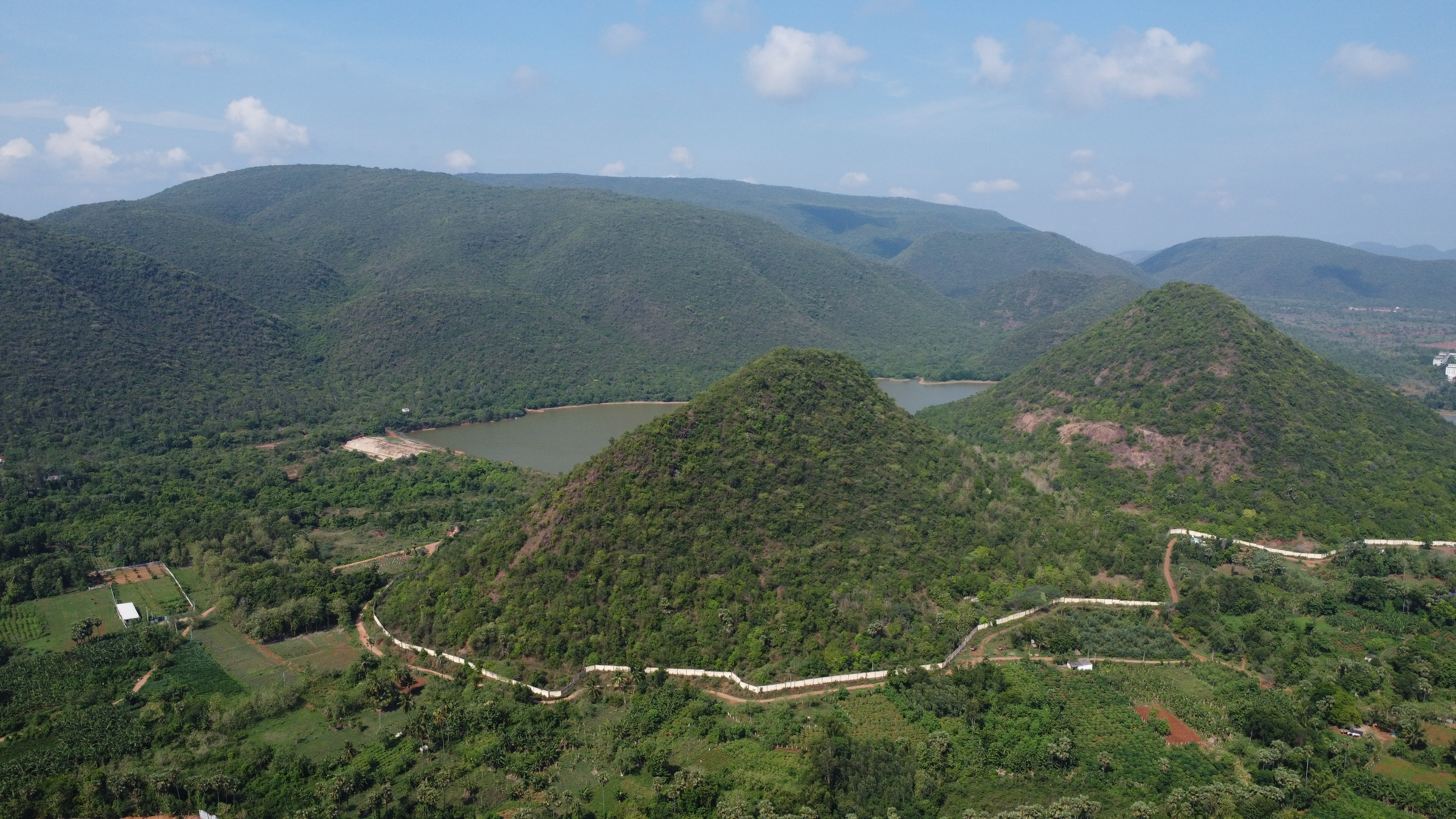
The reservoir surrounded by hills

Gambheeram Reservoir is a medium-scale reservoir in Gambheeram, Visakhapatnam, Andhra Pradesh. The dam on the tank was constructed in 1954 with the foundation stone being laid by the then Finance and Law Minister Tenneti Viswanatham on 19 May 1954. The main inflow is from the Gambheeram Gedda, which joins the Bay of Bengal at Mangamaripeta. The reservoir is situated north to the Kambalakonda Wildlife Sanctuary. It serves as a water source for the Vizag city and its capacity is 126 feet. There were plans to lay pipelines to connect Mudasarlova reservoir with the Gambheeram reservoir. There have been at least five instances of people drowning in the reservoir in recent years and swimming is prohibited.
