= Shivaji Palem =

Sivajipalem
- Neighbourhood
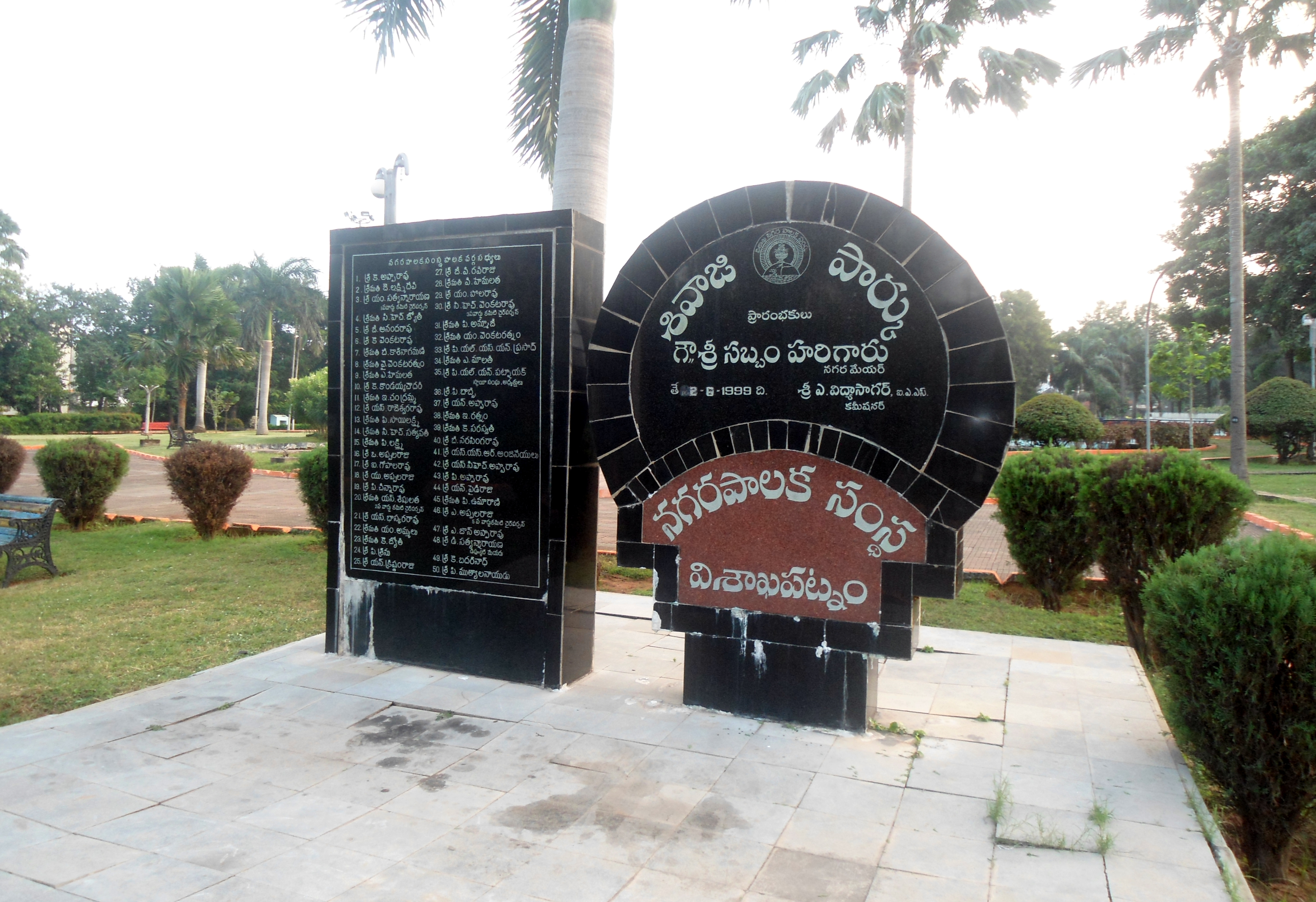
- Entrance Of Sivaji Park

- Location in Visakhapatnam
- Coordinates: 17.735163°N 83.328361°E
- Country: India
- State: Andhra Pradesh
- District: Visakhapatnam

Government
  - Body: Greater Visakhapatnam Municipal Corporation

Languages
  - Official: Telugu
- Time zone: UTC+5:30 (IST)
- PIN: 530017
- Vehicle registration: AP 31, AP 32 and AP 33

Sivajipalem is a locality in Visakhapatnam, Andhra Pradesh, India. It is one of the costliest suburbs with high real estate cost both for commercial and residential properties.

== Commercial area ==
There are many small shops in the area. But the choice is great in the neighbouring suburb of MVP Colony.

It is located opposite to National Highway No 16 towards one of the famous park in Visakhapatnam Sivaji Park

== Economy ==
Real estate and construction contributes to majority of economy.

== Transport ==
The state-owned APSRTC runs the city bus service, connecting to all the major centres of the city.
