= VMRDA Health Arena =

Indian urban park

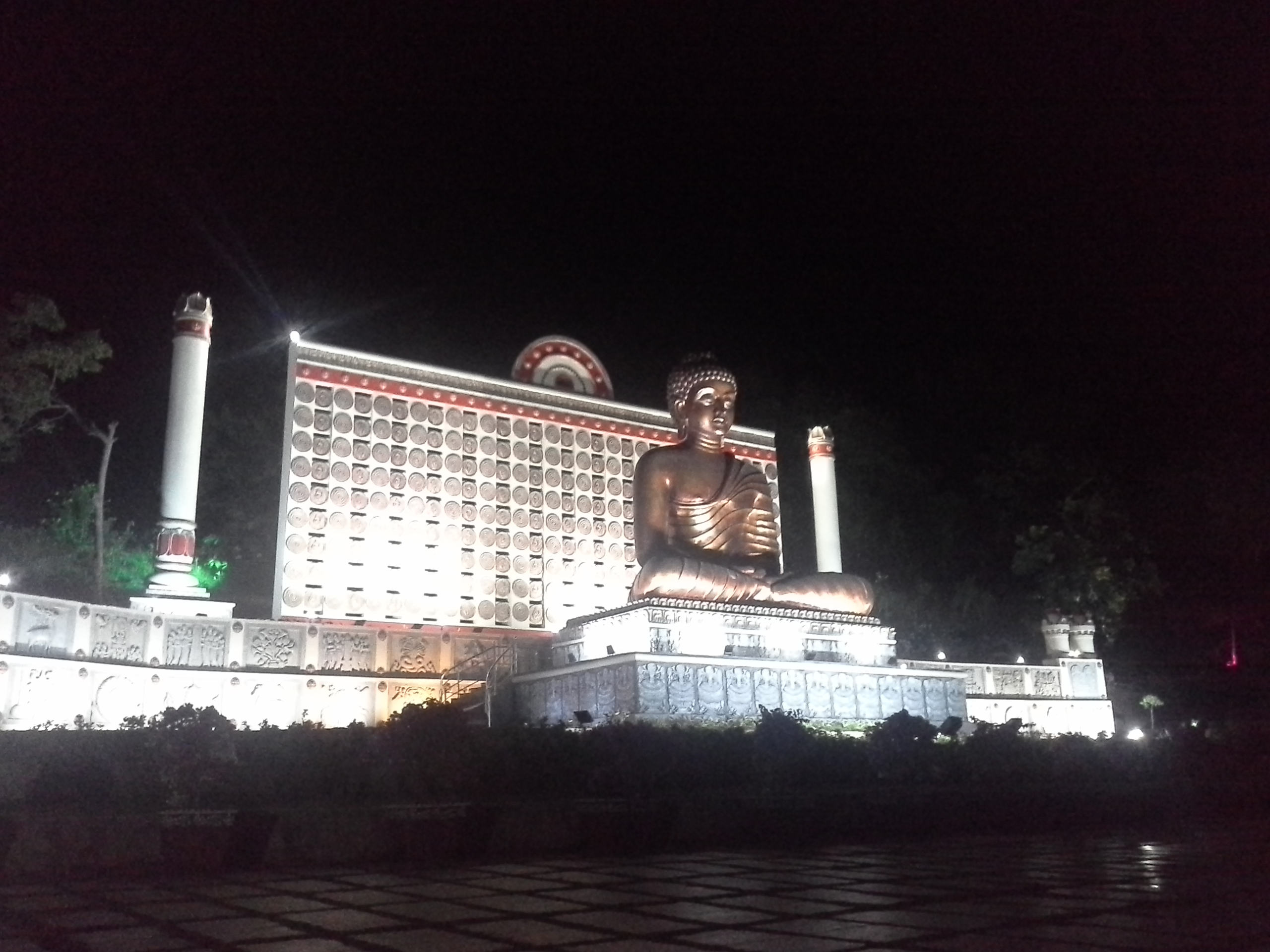
- Dhyana Buddha at Buddhavanam
- Interactive map of VMRDA Health Arena
- Type: Urban park
- Location: MVP Colony, Visakhapatnam, India
- Coordinates: 17.745516°N 83.345167°E
- Area: 20 acres (8.1 ha)
- Operator: Visakhapatnam Metropolitan Region Development Authority
- Open: 4.30AM-8.30PM
- Status: Open all year

VMRDA Health Arena also known as (Health Arena) is an urban park in the city of Visakhapatnam. The park is located at the foot hill of the Kailasagiri with 2.km Jogging Track. The total area of the park is 20 acres, it was the first health park in Andhra Pradesh to offer facilities for yoga, a gym and a cycling track .
