= Pulaparthi =

- village
- Interactive map of Pulaparthi
- Location in Andhra Pradesh, India
- Country: India
- State: Andhra Pradesh
- District: Anakapalli

Languages
  - Official: Telugu
- Time zone: UTC+5:30 (IST)
- PIN: 531055
- Telephone code: 08931
- Vehicle registration: AP31

Pulaparthi is one of 16 villages located in Yelamanchili Mandal, Anakapalli district, Andhra Pradesh, India. It had a recorded population of 2,744 in the 2011 census across its 747 households, and is now estimated to be between 2,662 and 3,293 in 2019/20. The oncoming 2021 census will provide official measurements.
