= Sundarapu Vijay Kumar =

Indian politician

Member of the Andhra Pradesh Legislative Assembly
- Incumbent
- Assumed office 2024
- Preceded by: Kanna Babu
- Constituency: Elamanchili

Personal details
- Party: Jana Sena Party

Sundarapu Vijay Kumar is an Indian politician from Andhra Pradesh. He is a member of Jana Sena Party. He has been elected as the Member of the Legislative Assembly representing the Elamanchili Assembly constituency in 2024 Andhra Pradesh Legislative Assembly elections.
