= Mettakkivalasa =

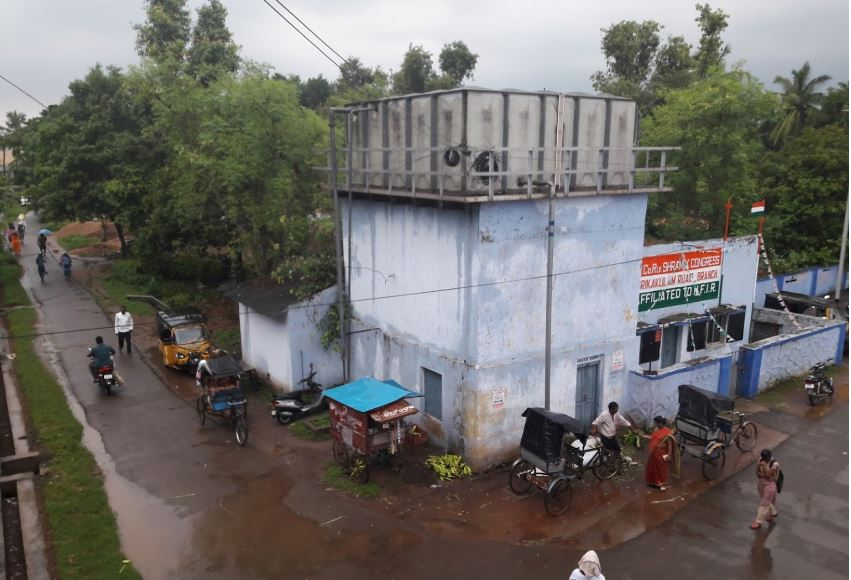
- Mettakkivalasa view from Amadalavalasa Railway Station
- Country: India
- State: Andhra Pradesh
- District: Srikakulam

Government
  - Type: Municipality
  - Body: Amadalavalasa Municipality
- Time zone: UTC+05:30
- Pin Code: 532185
- Area code: 08942

Mettakkivalasa is a suburb in Amadalavalasa Town, India. It is located close to other bigger suburbs such as Amadalavalasa and Chintada. Srikakulam Road Railway Station is in Mettakkivalasa Suburb of Amadalavalasa town, It is close to the Srikakulam Road Railway Quarters, It is about 10 Kilometers from Srikakulam City.

== Geography ==
Mettakkivalasa is located at 18.4167°N 83.9000°E.It has an average elevation of 29 metres (98 feet).

== Streets ==
There are many streets in Mettakkivalasa region, Kuppili vari street, Teachers Colony, Putta veedhi, Manukonda vari street, Kothaagraharam, Golla veedhi, BR Nagar, Hudco Colony, Amma Nagar, JK Baniyan Street.

== Electricity Board ==
APEPDCL, Andhra Pradesh Eastern Power Distribution is the official power supply board in Amadalavalasa Municipality, it serves all over Mettakkivalasa region.

== Water Supply ==
Amadalavalasa Municipality serves water to the Mettakkivalasa region, currently Amadalavalasa municipality has 100+ public water taps and more than 1000+ private water connections in mettakkivalasa region serving one hour water supply in a day.

== Temples ==
There are 4 temples in Mettakkivalasa region, Mettakkivalasa Varala Vinayaka Temple located in Main Road, Satya Sai Baba Temple, Shiridi sai baba Temple, Varaha Narasimha Temple

== Municipality ==
Amadalavalasa is a municipality and also the mandal headquarters of Amadalavalasa mandal. The town is spread over an area of 19.65 km2 (7.59 sq mi), which is under the jurisdiction of Visakhapatnam Urban Development Authority, Mettakkivalasa suburb belongs to Amadalavalasa Municipality.
