= Gambhiram =

- Neighbourhood
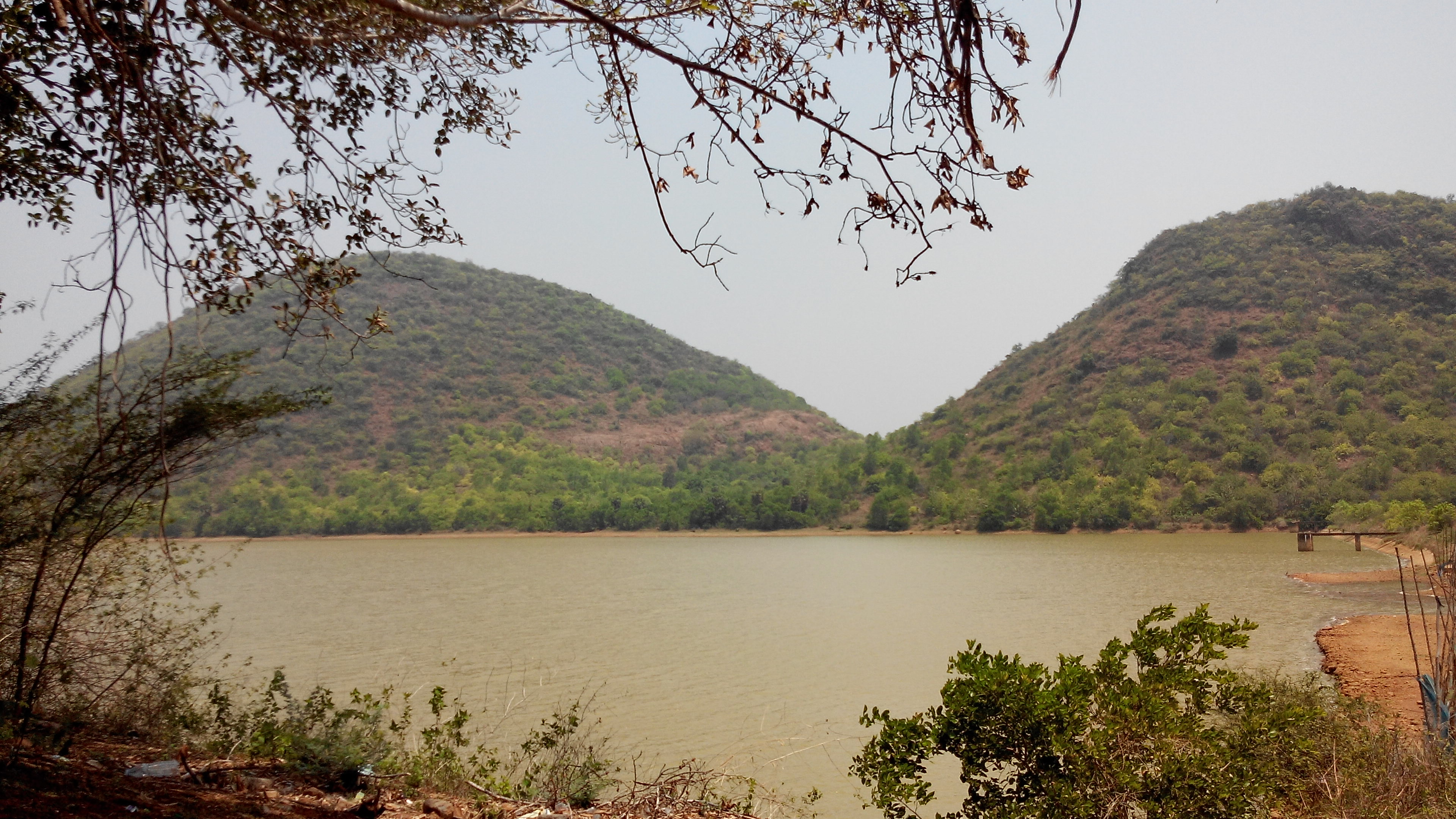
- Gambhiram Reservoir

- Location in Visakhapatnam
- Coordinates: 17.872613°N 83.369852°E
- Country: India
- State: Andhra Pradesh
- District: Visakhapatnam

Government
  - Body: Greater Visakhapatnam Municipal Corporation

Languages
  - Official: Telugu
- Time zone: UTC+5:30 (IST)
- PIN: 530052
- Vehicle Registration: AP31 (Former); AP39 (from 30 January 2019)

Gambhiram is a suburb of the city of Visakhapatnam state of Andhra Pradesh, India. It is known for engineering colleges and as a residential area. The IIM Visakhapatnam campus and Gambheeram Reservoir are situated nearby.

== Transport ==
It is 7km from Madhurawada and is well connected with Maddilapalem and Dwaraka Nagar.

APSRTC routes

Route number	Start	End	Via
222	Tagarapuvalasa	Railway Stn/RTC Complex	Anandapuram, Madhurawada, Yendada, Hanumanthuwaka, Maddilapalem
222V	Vizianagaram	RTC Complex	Tagarapuvalasa, Anandapuram, Madhurawada, Yendada, Hanumanthuwaka, Maddilapalem
111	Tagarapuvalasa	Kurmannapalem	Anandapuram, Madhurawada, Yendada, Hanumanthuwaka, Maddilapalem, RTC Complex, Jagadamba Centre, Town Kotharoad, Convent, Scindia, Malkapuram, Gajuwaka
111V	Vizianagaram	Kurmannapalem	Tagarapuvalasa, Anandapuram, Madhurawada, Yendada, Hanumanthuwaka, Maddilapalem, RTC Complex, Jagadamba Centre, Town Kotharoad, Convent, Scindia, Malkapuram, Gajuwaka
211	Vizianagaram	Visakhapatnam Railway Station	Tagarapuvalasa, Anandapuram, Madhurawada, Yendada, Hanumanthuwaka, Maddilapalem, RTC Complex
999	Bhimunipatnam	RTC Complex	Dorathota, Anandapuram, Madhurawada, Yendada, Hanumanthuwaka, Maddilapalem
