= Elamanchili =

- Town
- Elamanchili Railway Station

- Location in Andhra Pradesh, India
- Coordinates: 17°33′6″N 82°51′15″E
- Country: India
- State: Andhra Pradesh
- District: Anakapalli

Government
  - Type: Municipality
  - Body: Elamanchili Municipality, Visakhapatnam Metropolitan Region Development Authority
  - MLA: Sundarapu Vijay Kumar

Area
  - Total: 39.00 km^{2} (15.06 sq mi)
- Elevation: 7 m (23 ft)

Population
  - Total: 35,650
  - Density: 914.1/km^{2} (2,368/sq mi)

Languages
  - Official: Telugu
- Time zone: UTC+5:30 (IST)
- PIN: 531055
- Telephone code: 08931
- Vehicle Registration: AP31 (Former); AP39 (from 30 January 2019)

Elamanchili is a town in the Anakapalli district of the Indian state Andhra Pradesh. It is a municipality and also the mandal headquarters of Elamanchili mandal. It the second biggest city in Anakapalli district, after Anakapalle. The town is spread over an area of 39 km^{2} (15 mi^{2}), which is under the jurisdiction of Visakhapatnam Metropolitan Region Development Authority. This town has historical importance dating back to the 7th century CE.

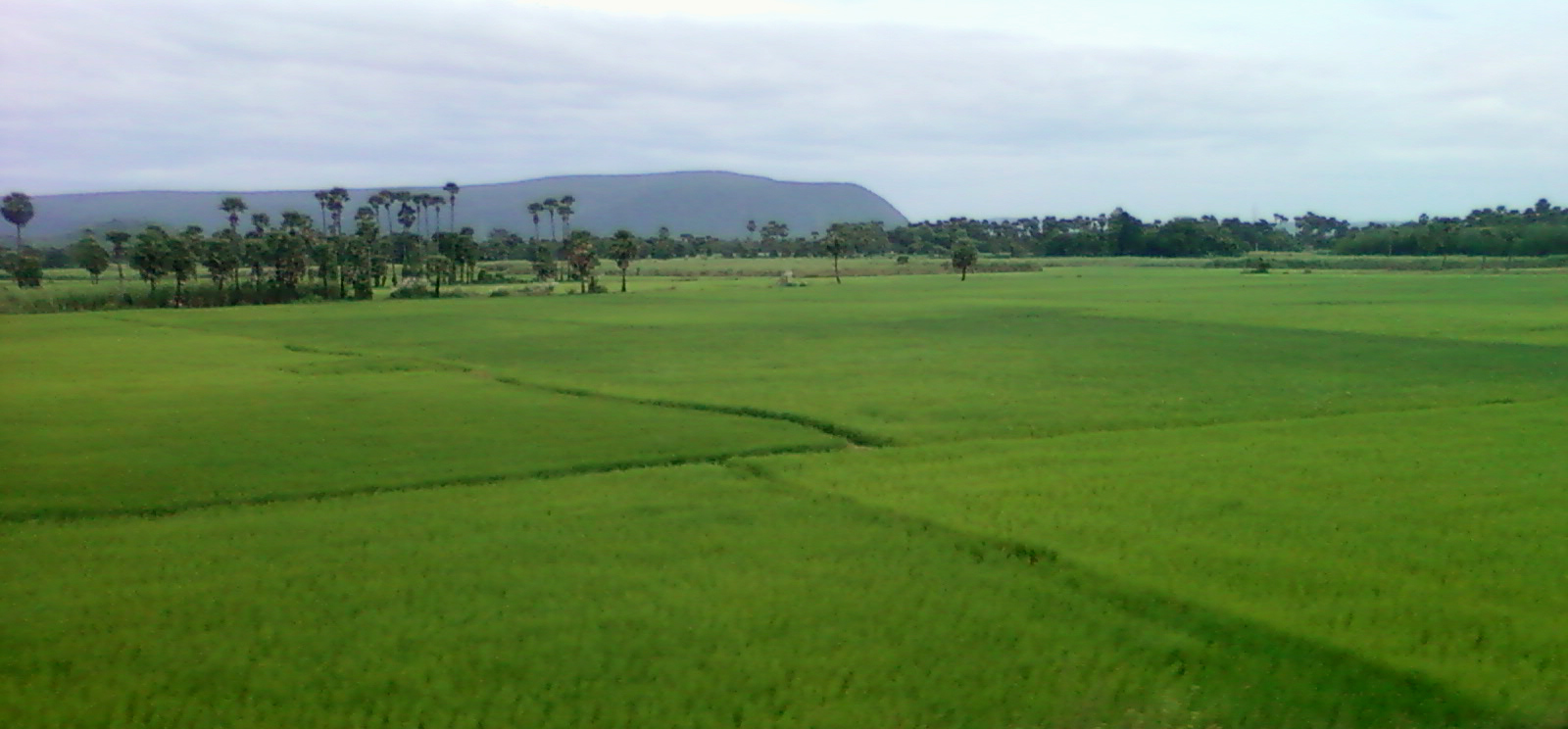
Landscape View near Elamanchili town

== History ==
Elamanchilii was once called Ellamanchi. It was the capital of the Madhyama Kalinga (Central Kalinga) kingdom, which extended from the Champavathi River to the Varaha River. The town was used for tax collection, as it is on the border of these areas. Kalla Varahala Naidu (Vara Naidu) was once the king of Elamanchili.

Many historical and archaeological findings were found surrounding Elamanchili, dating back the history of this town to the times of early Buddhism in India, Jainism, and medieval Hinduism. The Kotturu Dhanadibbalu Buddhist and Dharapalem Hindu sites respectively are near this town. This particular area of Elamanchili was once under the rule of Andhra-Sathavahanas. Some Pre-historic findings were excavated from the surroundings of Panchadharla, Dharapalem and Elamanchili surrounding Hills of Eastern Ghats. Research work is under progress on these excavations, and recently found lord venkateswara swamy statue.

The village of Sarvasiddhi (10 km from Elamanchili) was constructed by Eastern Chalukyas King Kubja Vishnuvardhan during 615 CE. Vishnuvardhana ruled over a kingdom extending from Nellore to Visakhapatnam. He assumed the title of Vishamasiddhi (conqueror of difficulties). Vishnuvardhana participated in the wars between his brother Putekesin II and the Pallava Narasimhavarma I and probably lost his life in battle in 641 CE. This area was under the Eastern Chalukyas. Elamanchili was under the rule of Eastern Chalukyas as some edicts were found by the name of Vijayaditya VII (1063 – 1068 C.E., 1072 – 1075 C.E.) at Elamanchili.

The famous Dharmalingeswara Temple at Panchadharla was believed to be constructed along with the famous

== Transport ==
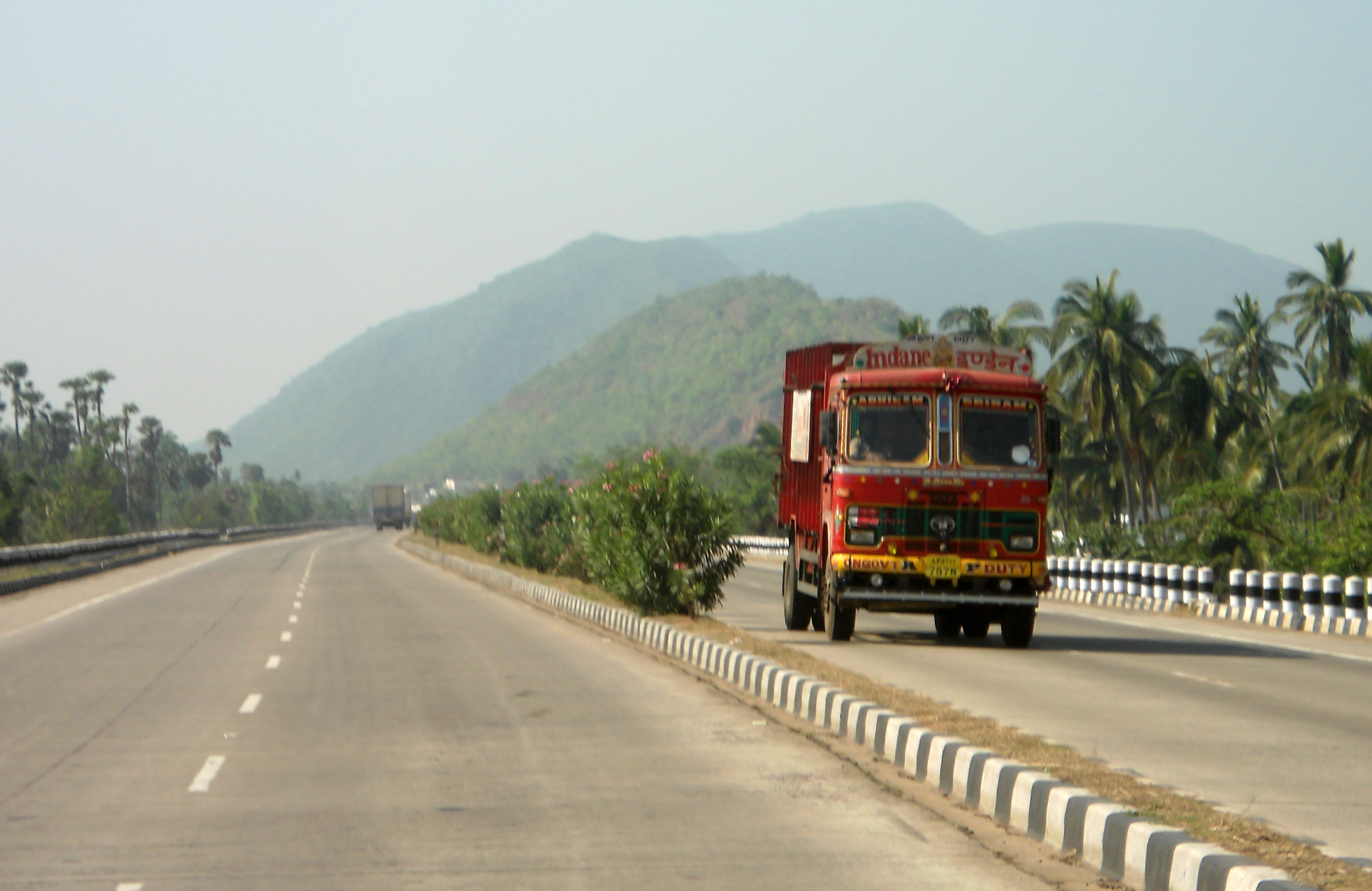
National Highway 5 at Elamanchili

Elamanchili is well connected by rail and road. Elamanchili railway station provide halt for many express trains. Buses are available from all parts of area in the state. Nearest airport is Visakhapatnam International Airport which is about 54 km from the town.

== Legislative Assembly ==
- 1951-1954 - N/A
- 1955-1962 - Venkata Surya Narayana Raju Chintlapat
- 1962-1967 - Veesam Sanyasi Naidu
- 1966-1972 - Satyanarayana Nagireddi
- 1972-1978 - Kumara Venkata Satya Narayana Raju Kakarlapudi (K K Raju)
- 1978-1983 - Veesam Sanyasi Naidu
- 1983-1985 - Kumara Venkata Satya Narayana Raju Kakarlapudi (K K Raju)
- 1985-2004 - Chalapathi Rao Pappala
- 2004-2014 - Kanna Babu (U V R Raju)
- 2014–2019- Panchakarla Ramesh Babu
- 2019-2024- Kanna Babu (U V R Raju)
- 2024–Present- Sundarapu Vijay kumar

== Education ==
The primary and secondary school education is imparted by government, aided and private schools, under the School Education Department of the state.

== See also ==
- List of municipalities in Andhra Pradesh
