= Sivaji Park =

Urban park in Visakhapatnam, India

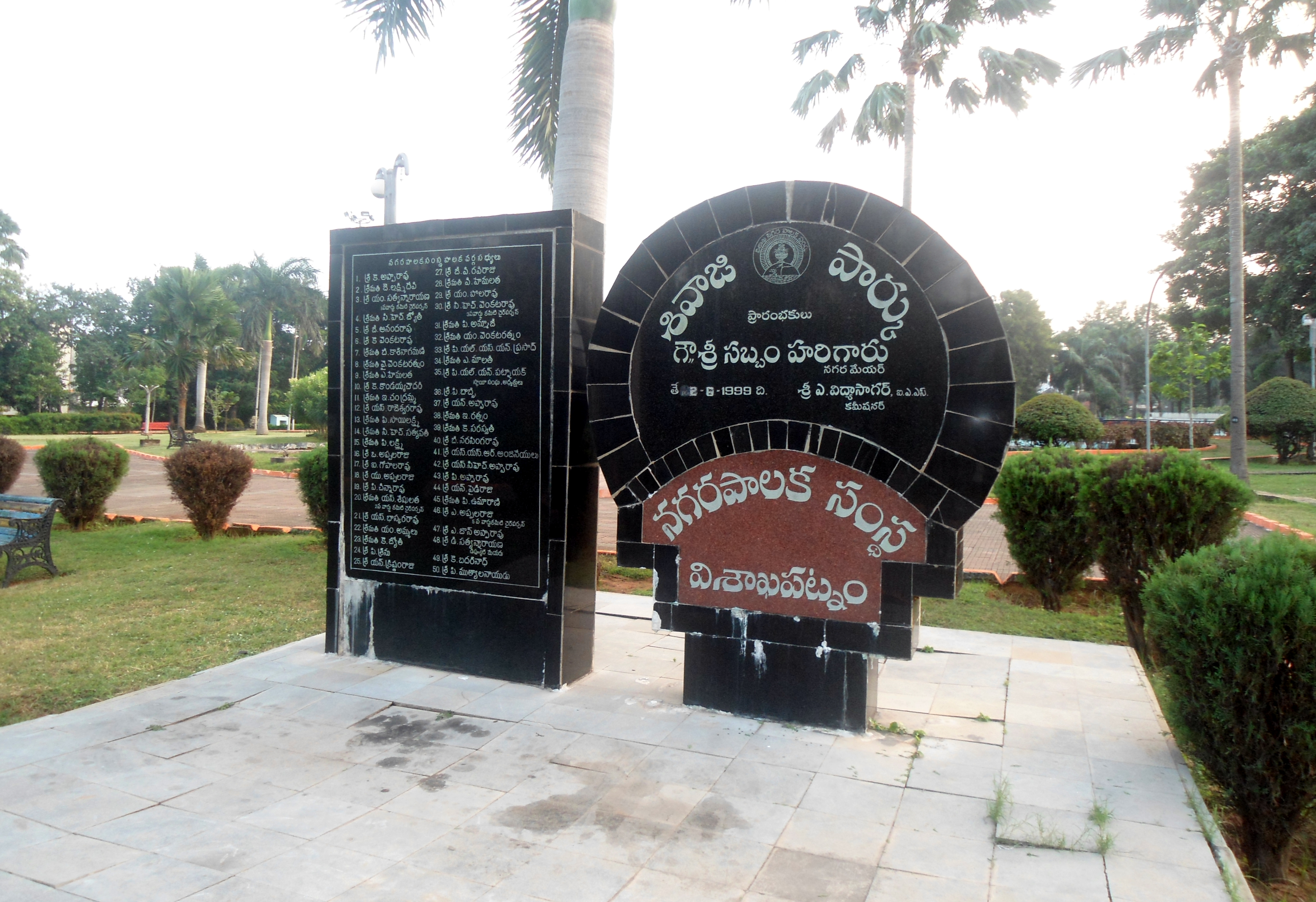
- Entrance Of Shivaji Park
- Location: Sivajipalem Visakhapatnam, Andhra Pradesh, India
- Area: 16 acres (6.5 ha)
- Created: 1999
- Operator: Greater Visakhapatnam Municipal Corporation

Sivaji Park is an urban park in the Indian city of Visakhapatnam. It is spread over 16 acres (6.5 ha) of land and is surrounded by MVP Colony and Sivajipalem. Originally a dumping yard, it was created in 1999 with an initial investment of ₹ 8 lakh.

It is one of the most famous attractions of Visakhapatnam. However, The Hindu reports that the park has become a garbage dump with "Overgrown shrubs, broken benches, and play equipment".

== Image Gallery ==
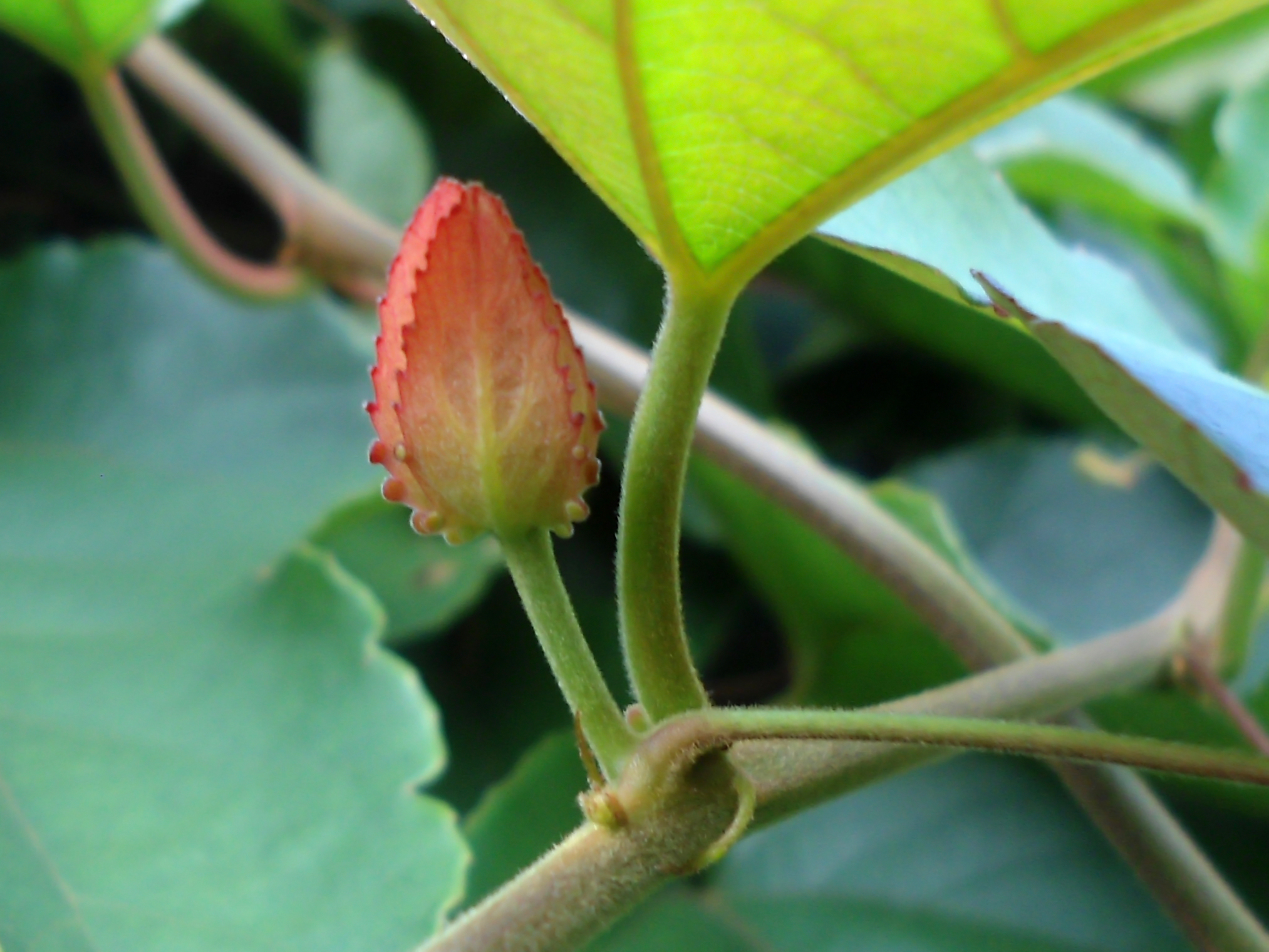
(Thunbergia grandiflora) Flower bud at Shivaji Park

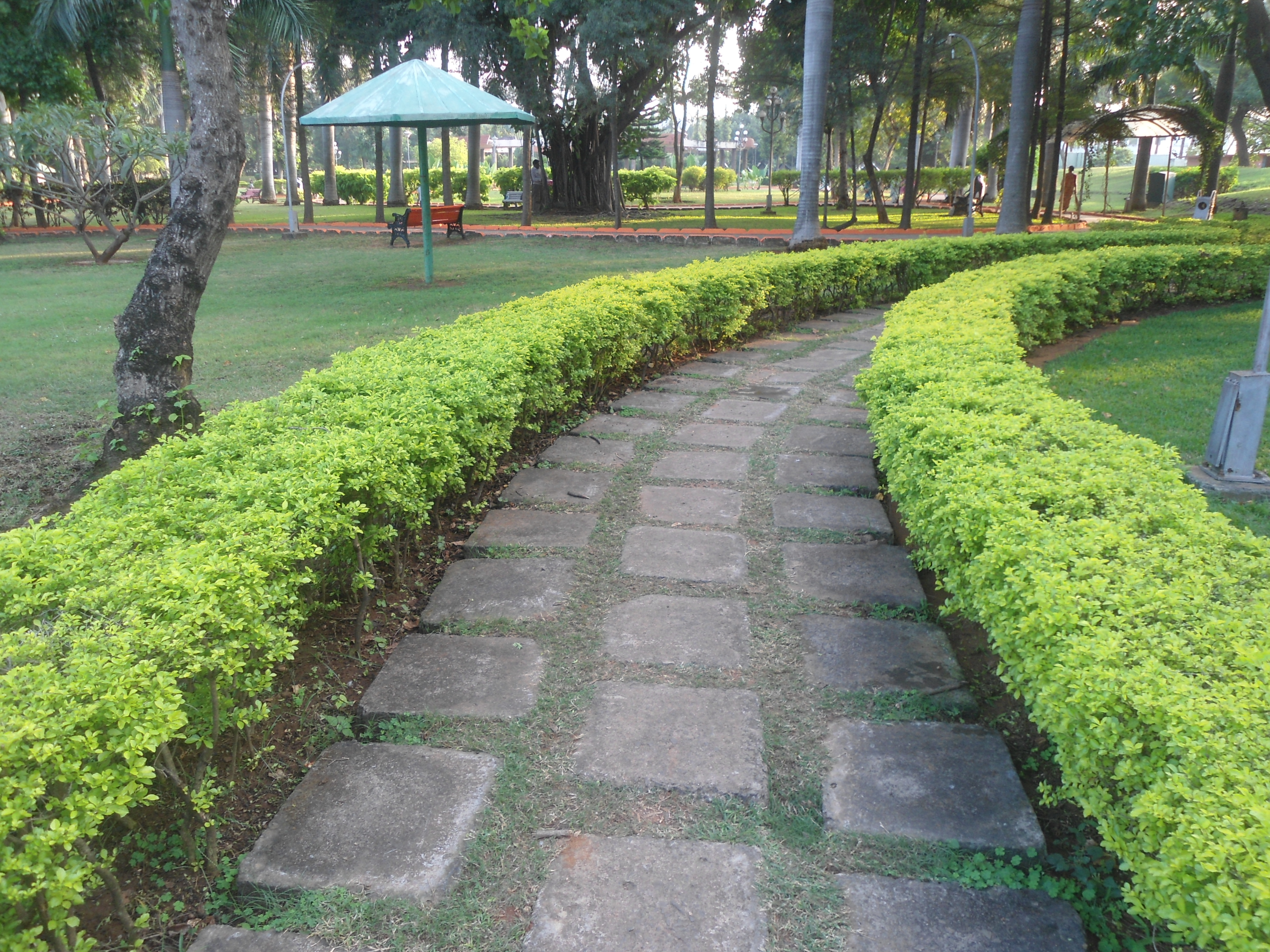
Walkway at Shivaji park

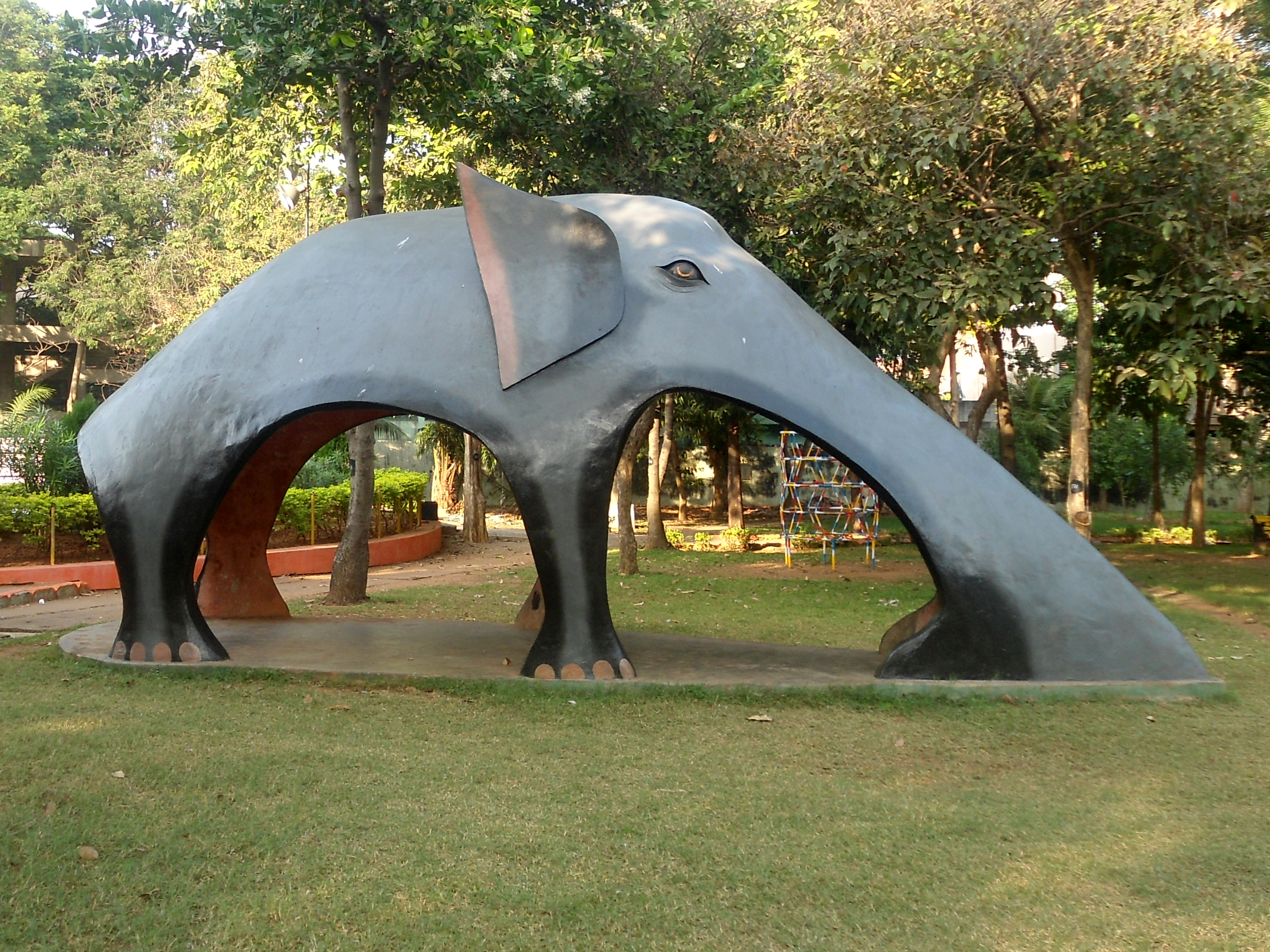
Children's play area at shivaji park

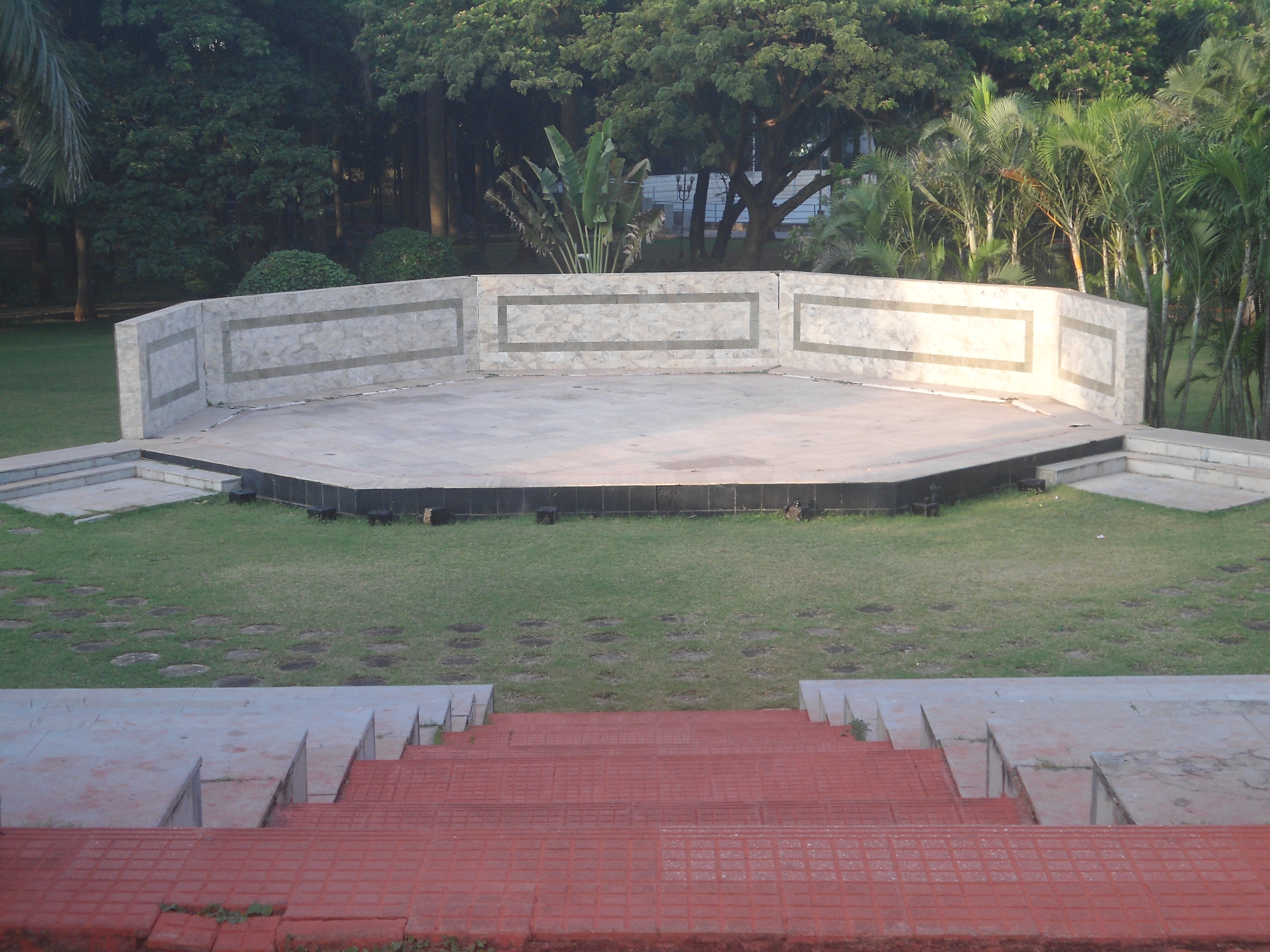
Amphi theater at Shivaji Park in Visakhapatnam

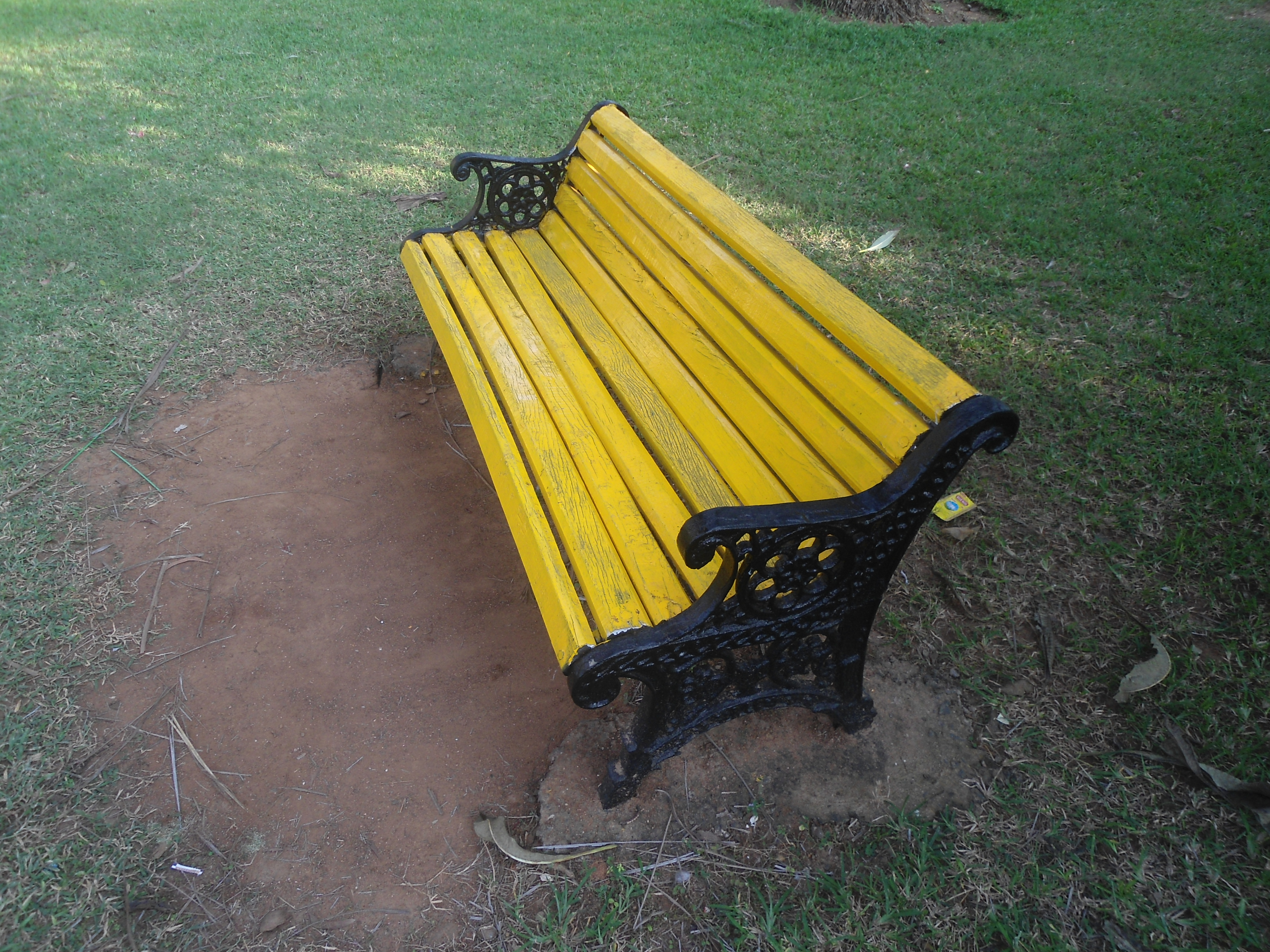
Bench at Shivaji Park
