= Mudasarlova Reservoir =

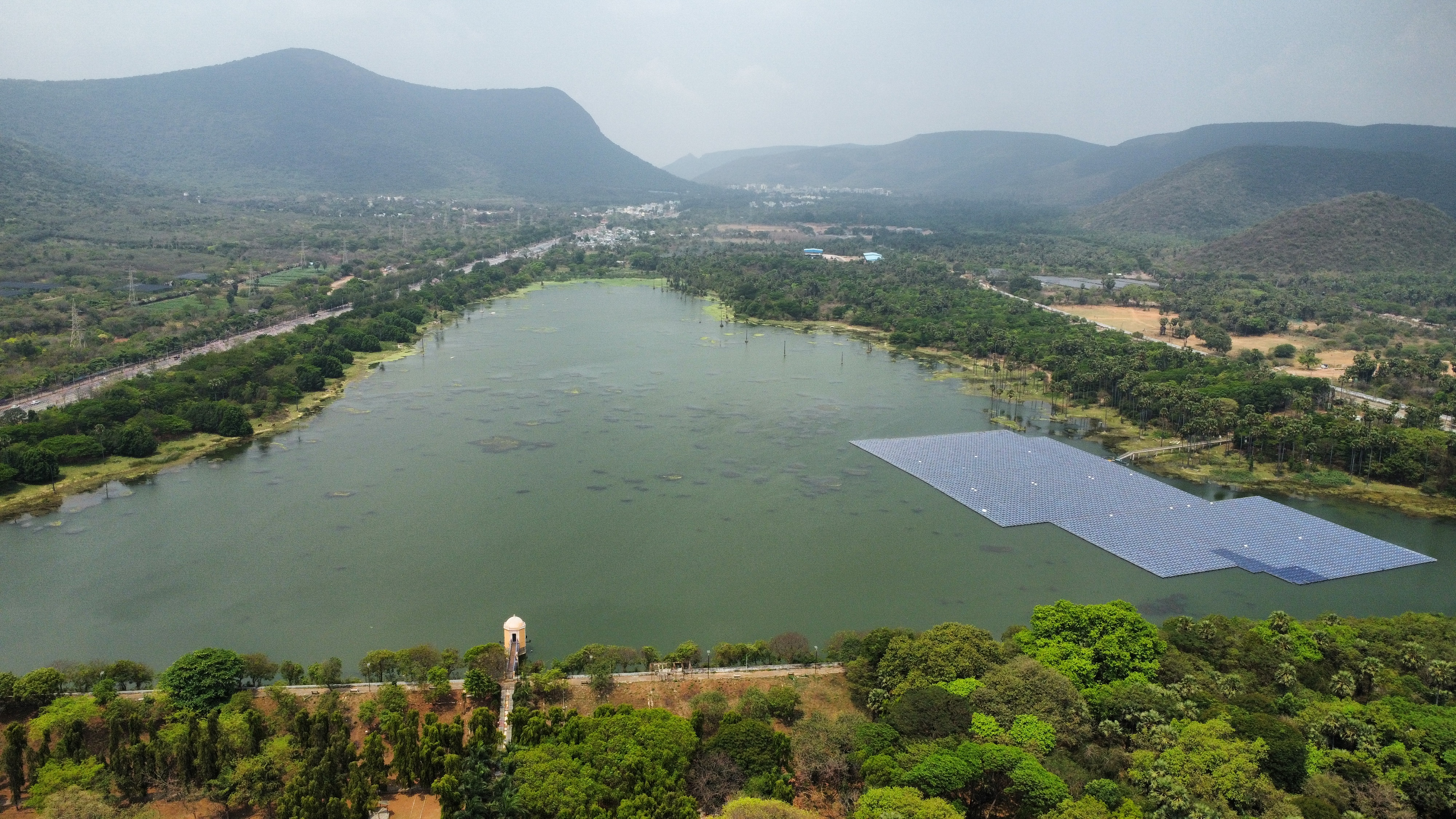
- Mudasarlova Reservoir aerial view

- Location within Visakhapatnam
- Location: Visakhapatnam, Andhra Pradesh, India
- Coordinates: 17.765346°N 83.294556°E
- Type: reservoir
- Surface area: 25 hectares (62 acres)

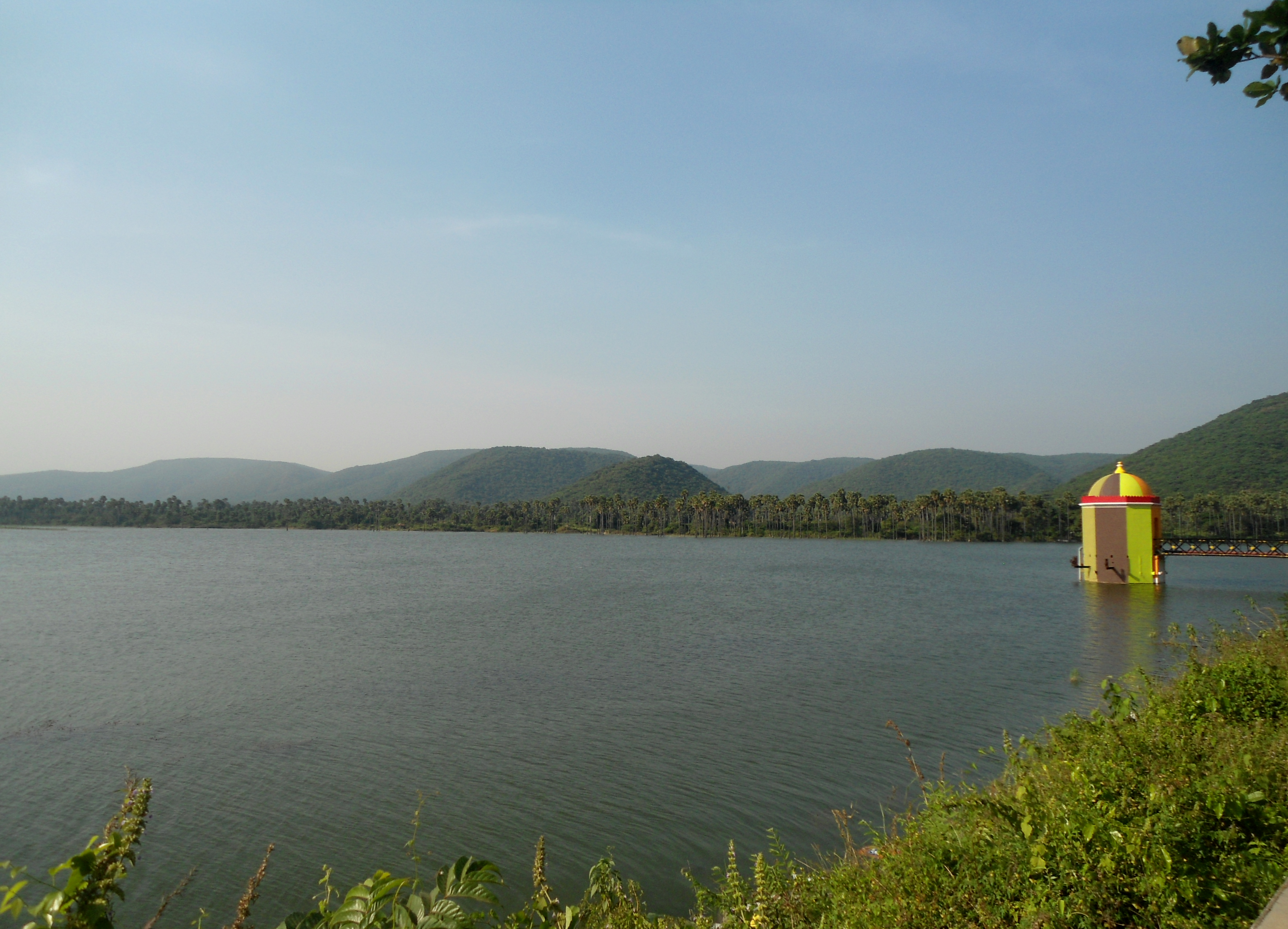
Mudasarlova Reservoir and decorated motor Pump house

Mudasarlova Reservoir is a reservoir in Visakhapatnam which covers 25 hectares (62 acres) and has a flow of 1.5MGD (millions of gallons per day). The Government of Andhra Pradesh built a floating solar power plant with a 2MW capacity on the reservoir. Mudasarlova Park and East Point Golf Club are situated nearby this reservoir.
