= Dimili, Anakapalli district =

Dimili
- village
- Interactive map of Dimili
- Location in Andhra Pradesh, India Dimili (India)
- Coordinates: 17°30′44″N 82°52′21″E
- Country: India
- State: Andhra Pradesh
- District: Anakapalli

Population (2001)
  - Total: 4,100

Languages
  - Official: Telugu
- Time zone: UTC+5:30 (IST)

Dimili is a village in Rambilli mandal of Anakapalli district, Andhra Pradesh, India, nearly 60 km from Visakhapatnam city.

== Demographics ==
According to Indian census, 2001, the demographic details of this village is as follows:

- Total Population: 4,100 in 1,035 Households.
- Male Population: 2,048
- Female Population: 2,052
- Children Under 6-years: 506 (Boys - 236 and Girls - 270)
- Total Literates: 2,143
