= MVP Colony =

- Neighbourhood
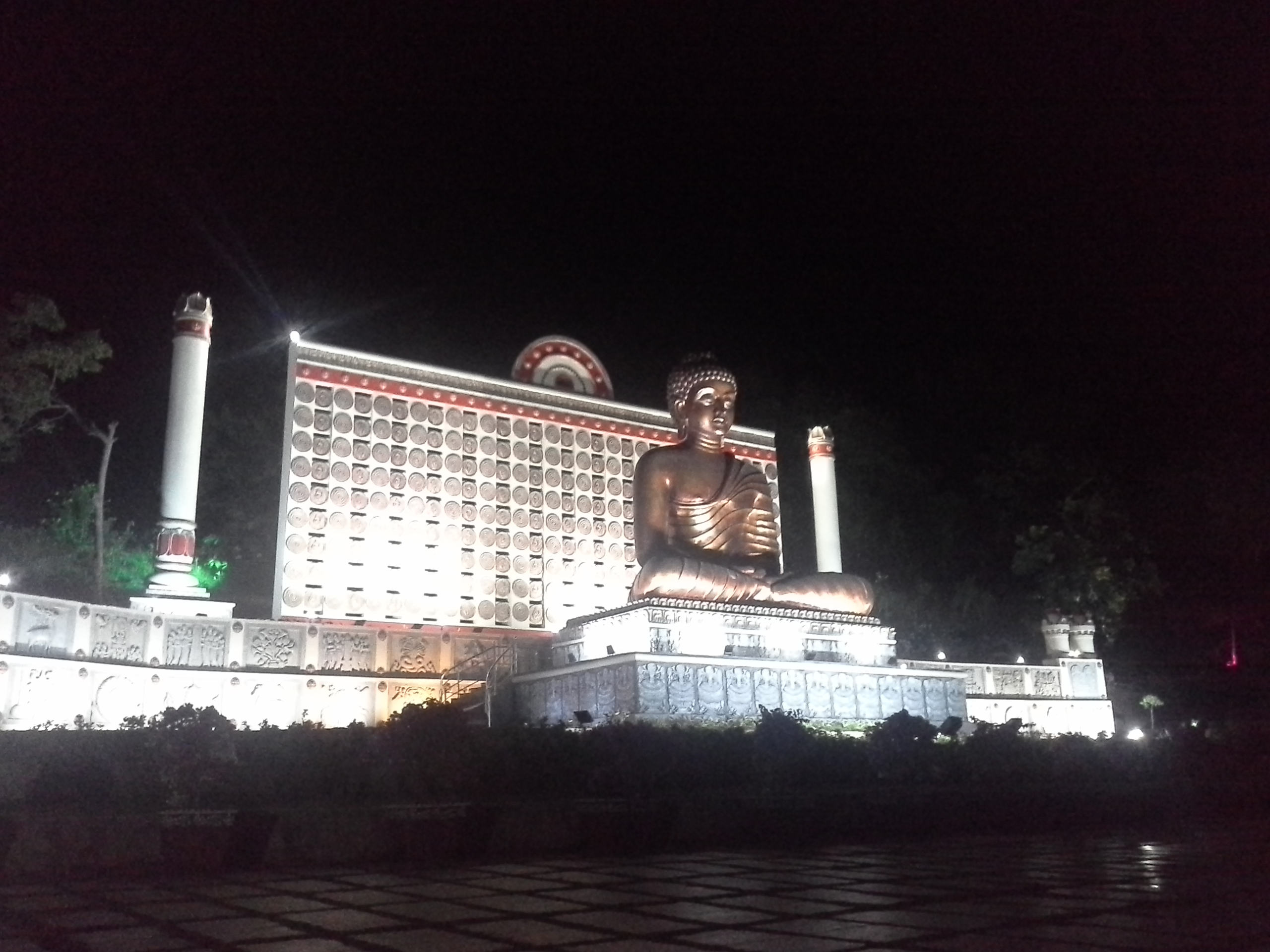
- Buddhavanam at MVP Colony

- Location in Visakhapatnam
- Coordinates: 17.741413°N 83.338700°E
- Country: India
- State: Andhra Pradesh
- District: Visakhapatnam

Government
  - Body: Greater Visakhapatnam Municipal Corporation

Languages
  - Official: Telugu
- Time zone: UTC+5:30 (IST)
- PIN: 530017
- Vehicle Registration: AP31, AP32, AP33 (Former); AP39 (from 30 January 2019)

Muvvala Vani Palem Colony, known as MVP Colony is an urban neighborhood in the Indian city of Visakhapatnam and it was once Asia's largest residential township with a population of more than 70,000. The colony is divided into 12 sectors.

It is a well-developed colony in Visakhapatnam with many hotels, restaurants, temples, parks, and also hospitals. A modern auditorium, an amphitheater and three convention halls worth ₹ 20 crore are being constructed here. The foundation stone for these was laid in February 2014.

A track was laid along the foothills of Kailasgiri called the VMRDA Health Arena or Buddha Vanam which was inaugurated in January 2016. It was developed by VUDA after spending nearly ₹8 crores. Buddha Vanam with a 31-foot Buddha statue raised on a three-foot pedestal is an attraction for tourists. Very quickly, it turned into a rendezvous for the health-conscious as well as tourists thronging the city for its landscaping. This is the only park in the city which has a long stretch for walking and cycling for which there is a dedicated track. The Buddha Vanam also attracts several women and senior citizens for meditation. Many visit the imposing statue area for yoga, Suryanamaskar, and laughing exercise.

Tenneti Park, which is at the intersection of Sector-9 and the beach road towards Bhimili (Marine drive), has views of the Bay of Bengal and the anchored ships in the harbor. The Shivaji Park is located adjacent to the colony.

== Transport ==
APS RTC operates bus services from MVP Colony bus station to every part of the city. MVP Double road and Beach road are major roads. The most important bus route is 540 which runs from MVP Complex to Simhachalam, 900 which runs from Maddilapalem to railway station via MVP Colony. 900K which runs from Bheemili to RTC Complex via MVP and Ushodaya Junction.

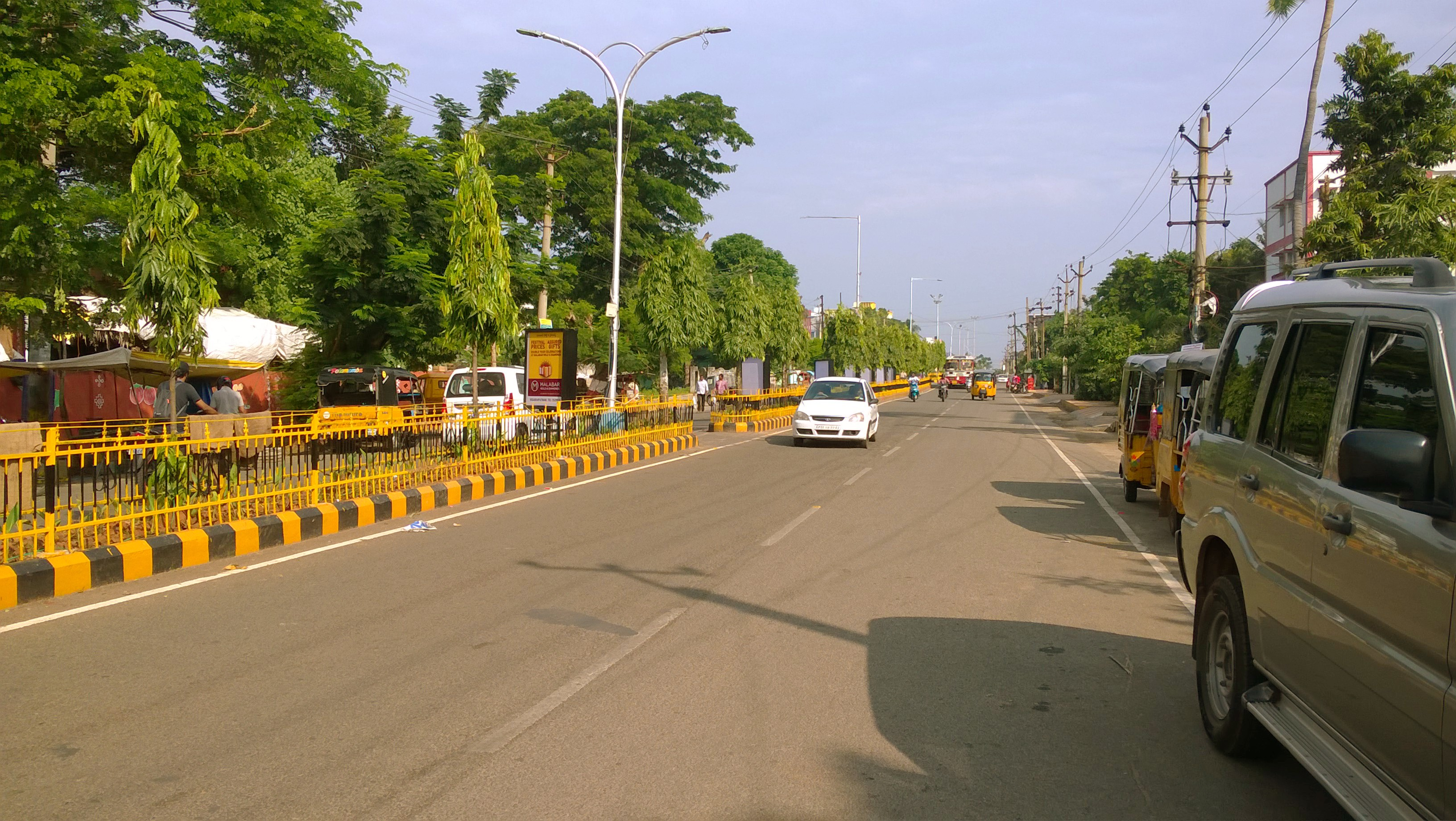
MVP Double Road in Colony

APSRTC routes

Route number	Start	End	Via
900	Maddilapalem	Railway Station	Venkojipalem, MVP Colony, Pedawaltair, Siripuram, RTC Complex
14	Venkojipalem	Old Head Post Office	Appughar, Chinnawaltair, Siripuram, Jagadamba Centre, Town Kotharoad
17K	Bhimunipatnam	Old Head Post Office	INS Kalinga, Thimmapuram, Rushikonda, Sagarnagar, Appughar, MVP Colony, Pedawaltair, Siripuram, RTC Complex, Jagadamba Centre, Town Kotharoad
900K	Bhimunipatnam	RTC Complex	INS Kalinga, Thimmapuram, Rushikonda, Sagarnagar, Appughar, MVP Colony, Pedawaltair, Siripuram
900T	Tagarapuvalasa	RTC Complex	Bhimili, INS Kalinga, Thimmapuram, Rushikonda, Sagarnagar, Appughar, MVP Colony, Pedawaltair, Siripuram
210	Ravindra Nagar	Gantyada HB Colony	Hanumanthuwaka, Appughar, MVP Colony, Pedawaltair, Siripuram, RK Beach, Jagadamba Centre, Town Kotharoad, Convent, Scindia, Malkapuram, New Gajuwaka, Pedagantyada
540	MVP Colony	Simhachalam	Venkojipalem, Maddilapalem, Gurudwar, Birla Junction, NAD Kotharoad, Gopalapatnam
549	Railway Station	Simhachalam	RTC Complex, Siripuram, Pedawaltair, MVP Colony, Venkojipalem, Maddilapalem, Gurudwar, Birla Junction, NAD Kotharoad, Gopalapatnam
