= Visakhapatnam Urban Development Authority =

Urban planning agency in India

- VUDA Official Logo

Agency overview
- Formed: 1978
- Dissolved: 2018
- Type: Urban Planning Agency
- Jurisdiction: Government of Andhra Pradesh
- Headquarters: Siripuram, Visakhapatnam, Andhra Pradesh; 17.721527°N 83.318062°E
- Agency executive: Chairman; Vice-Chairman
- Parent agency: Municipal Administration and Urban Development
- Website: VUDA Official Website

The Visakhapatnam Urban Development Authority or VUDA was the urban planning agency of Visakhapatnam, in the Indian state of Andhra Pradesh. It was formed in 1978, vide an act of the State Assembly of Andhra Pradesh. Its jurisdiction was expanded in 2018 by merging it with the surrounding mandals to form Visakhapatnam Metropolitan Region Development Authority.

== Jurisdiction ==
Under the jurisdiction of VUDA, the Visakhapatnam Metropolitan Region (VMR), comprises, Visakhapatnam and the districts of Srikakulam, Visakhapatnam, Anakapalli and Vizianagaram. It is spread over an area of 5,573 km^{2} (2,152 sq mi) and has a population of 53.4 lakhs. Anakapalle and Bheemunipatnam were merged in Greater Visakhapatnam Municipal Corporation (GVMC).

== Defunct ==
It was dissolved to form a new authority in the name of VMRDA
