= Visakhapatnam Metropolitan Region Development Authority =

Urban planning agency of Vizag

Agency overview
- Formed: 5 September 2018
- Preceding agency: VUDA
- Type: Urban Planning Agency
- Jurisdiction: Government of Andhra Pradesh
- Headquarters: Siripuram, Visakhapatnam, Andhra Pradesh; 17.721527°N 83.318062°E
- Ministers responsible: N. Chandrababu Naidu, Chief Minister; Ponguru Narayana, Minister of Municipal Administration and Urban Development
- Agency executives: M V Pranav Gopal, Chairperson; N Tej Bharath I.A.S, Metropolitan Commissioner
- Parent agency: Ministry of Municipal Administration and Urban Development
- Website: www.vmrda.gov.in

The Visakhapatnam Metropolitan Region Development Authority (VMRDA) is the urban planning agency of Visakhapatnam in the Indian state of Andhra Pradesh. It was formed by expanding the existing Visakhapatnam Urban Development Authority (VUDA). The VMRDA administers the Visakhapatnam Metropolitan Region, spread over an area of 7,328.86 km^{2} (2,829.69 sq mi) and covers the districts of Visakhapatnam, Vizianagaram and Anakapalli. It was set up for the purposes of planning, co-ordination, supervising, promoting and securing the planned development of the Visakhapatnam Metropolitan Region. It coordinates the development activities of the municipal corporations, municipalities and other local authorities.

== Jurisdiction ==
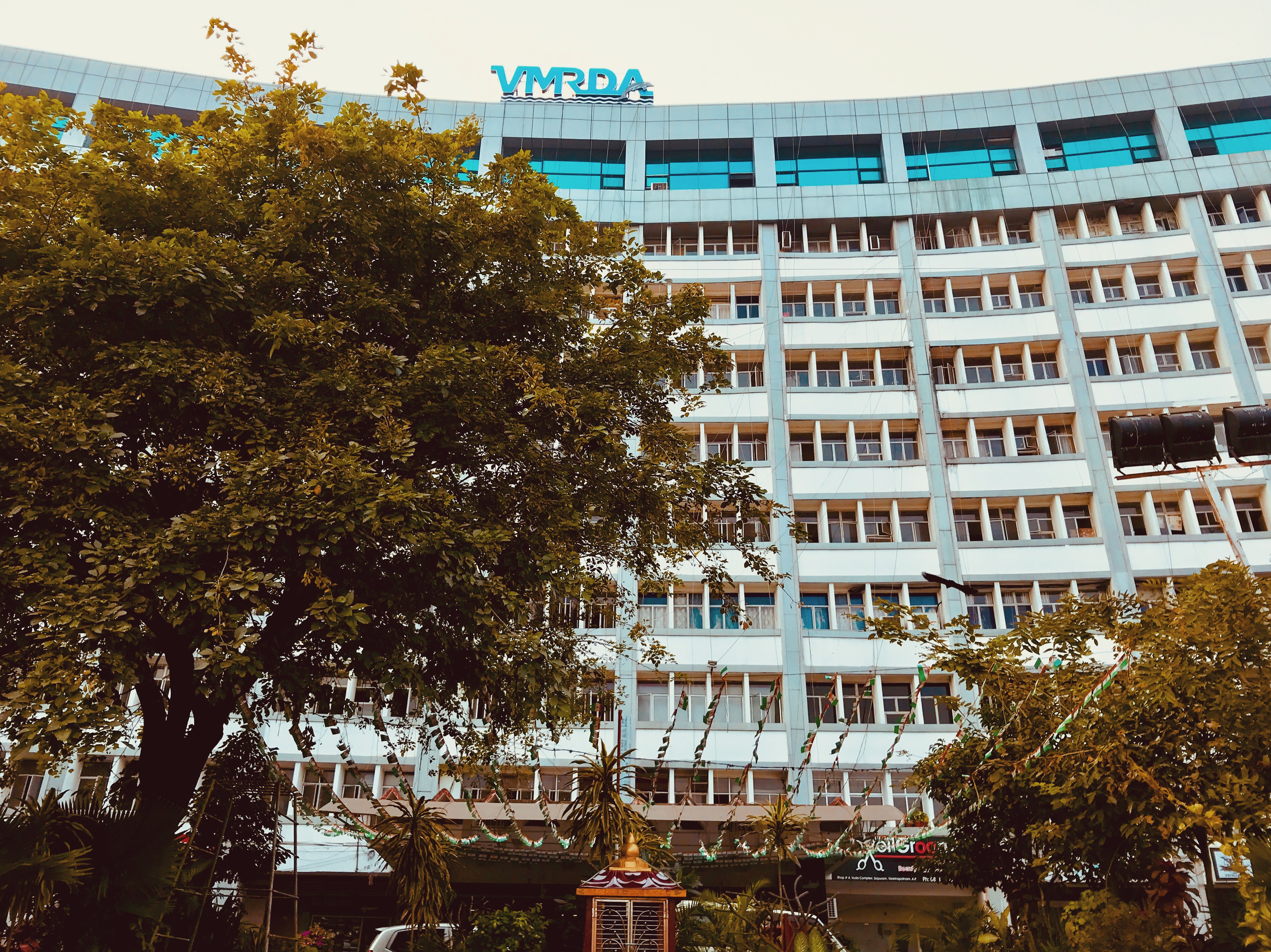
VMRDA Headquarters at Siripuram, Visakhapatnam

Under the jurisdiction of VMRDA, the Visakhapatnam Metropolitan Region (VMR), comprises, Visakhapatnam city and the districts of Vizianagaram, Visakhapatnam and Anakapalli. It is spread over an area of 7,328.86 km^{2} (2,829.69 sq mi) and has a population of 40.7 lakhs according to the 2011 census.

The below table list the urban areas of VMR:

Jurisdiction
Settlement Type	Name	Total
Municipal Corporations	GVMC, Vizianagaram	2
Municipalities	Yelamanchili, Narsipatnam	2
Nagar Panchayat	Nellimarla	1

== Developing Projects ==
The Future Developing Projects by VMRDA given below.

- Mudasarlova Park.
- Visakhapatnam Metro.
- Heli Tourism.
- Beach corridor from Visakhapatnam to Bhogapuram.
- Smart Cities Mission.
- Integrated museum and tourism complex.

== Expansion ==
Thirteen mandals of the Visakhapatnam district have been brought under the Visakhapatnam Metropolitan Region Development Authority (VMRDA). Visakhapatnam District is made up of a total of 46 mandals. 22 were already under VMRDA and the Integrated Tribal Development Agency (ITDA) takes care of 11 mandals.

On 23 March 2021, VMRDA has taken the remaining 13 non-Agency mandals under its jurisdiction, taking its total to 52 mandals. This decision comes in light of the rapid urbanisation towards the western corridors of Visakhapatnam city. As per sources, this inclusion of mandals is expected to reduce pressure on the urban infrastructure of the city, ensuring planned development in the fringe areas.

Narsipatnam, Rolugunta, Chodavaram, and Madugula are a few of the 13 mandals. In total, they cover 431 villages and are spread across an area of 2,280.19 km^{2} (880.39 sq mi). According to sources, these mandals are said to have the potential to develop as urban areas. With this new inclusion, the jurisdiction of VMRDA has extended to a total of 7,328.86 km^{2} (2,829.69 sq mi).

== See also ==
- Greater Visakhapatnam Municipal Corporation
