= Mudasarlova Park =

Urban park in Visakhapatnam, India

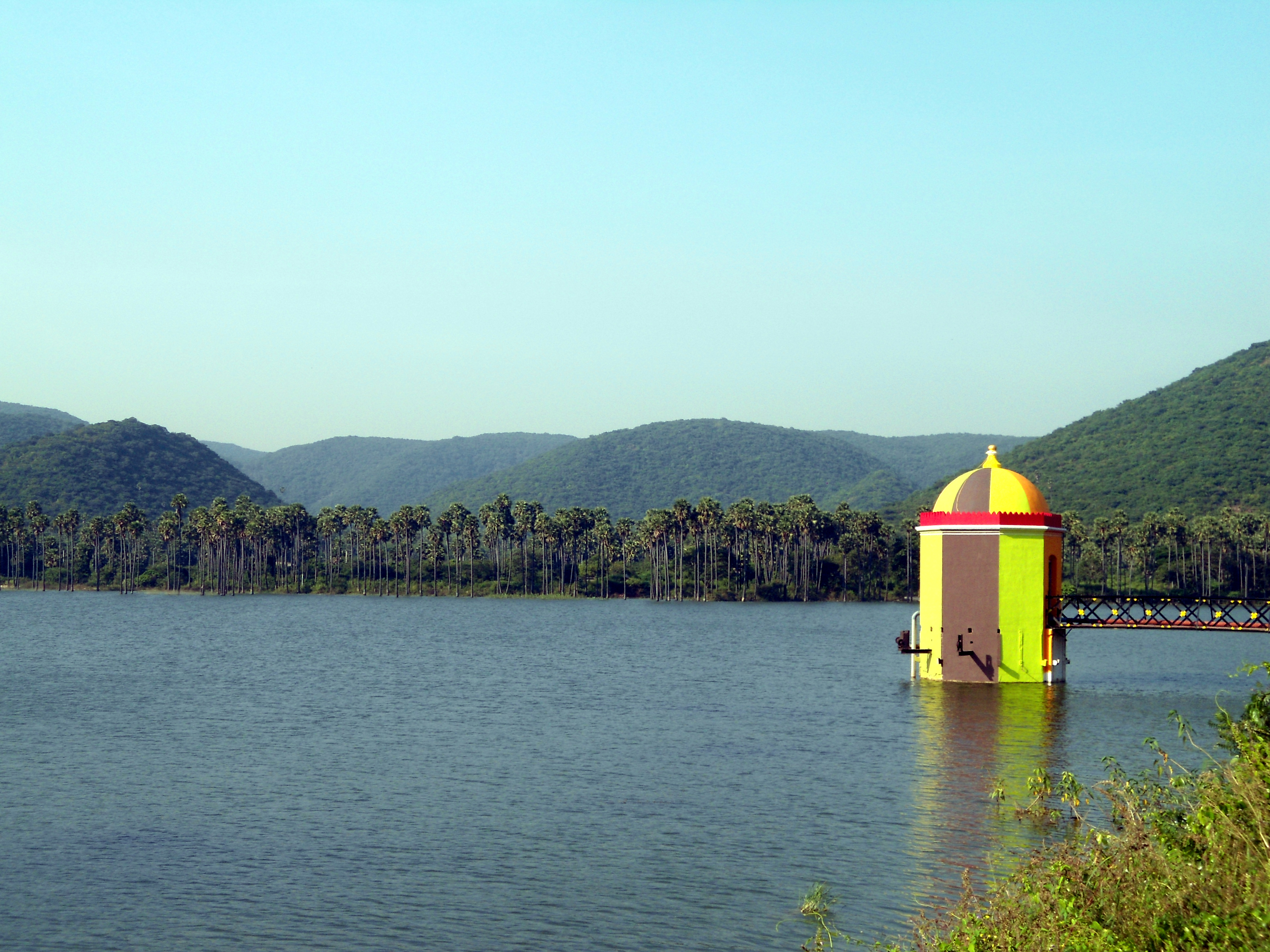
- Location: Chinna Gadhili Visakhapatnam, Andhra Pradesh, India
- Area: 20 acres (8.1 ha)
- Created: 1902
- Operator: VMRDA

Mudasarlova Park is an urban park in the Indian city of Visakhapatnam. It is spread over 20 acres (8.1 ha) of land. it was constructed in 1902 and is one of the oldest parks in this Coastal Andhra. The water reservoir in the park supplies drinking water to the city. It was named one of the best picnic spots for local citizens.. The land for the construction of Mudasarlova was donated by Maharaja Sri Pusapati Ananda Gajapati Raju (Ex-MP, Visakhapatnam) from his family trust.

== Mudasarlova Reservoir ==
Mudasarlova Park has the oldest Water reservoir in Visakhapatnam. It supplies 1 million gallons water per day. this reservoir constructed by the British in 1901.

The Floating solar power plant was built in 20 acres of the reservoir, among the oldest man-made water bodies, on the outskirts of the city, at a cost of ₹11.34 crore.

== Theme Park ==
Visakhapatnam Metropolitan Region Development Authority is developing a theme park.
