= Mangamaripeta =

Mangamaripeta Madhura Mangamaripeta
- Neighbourhood
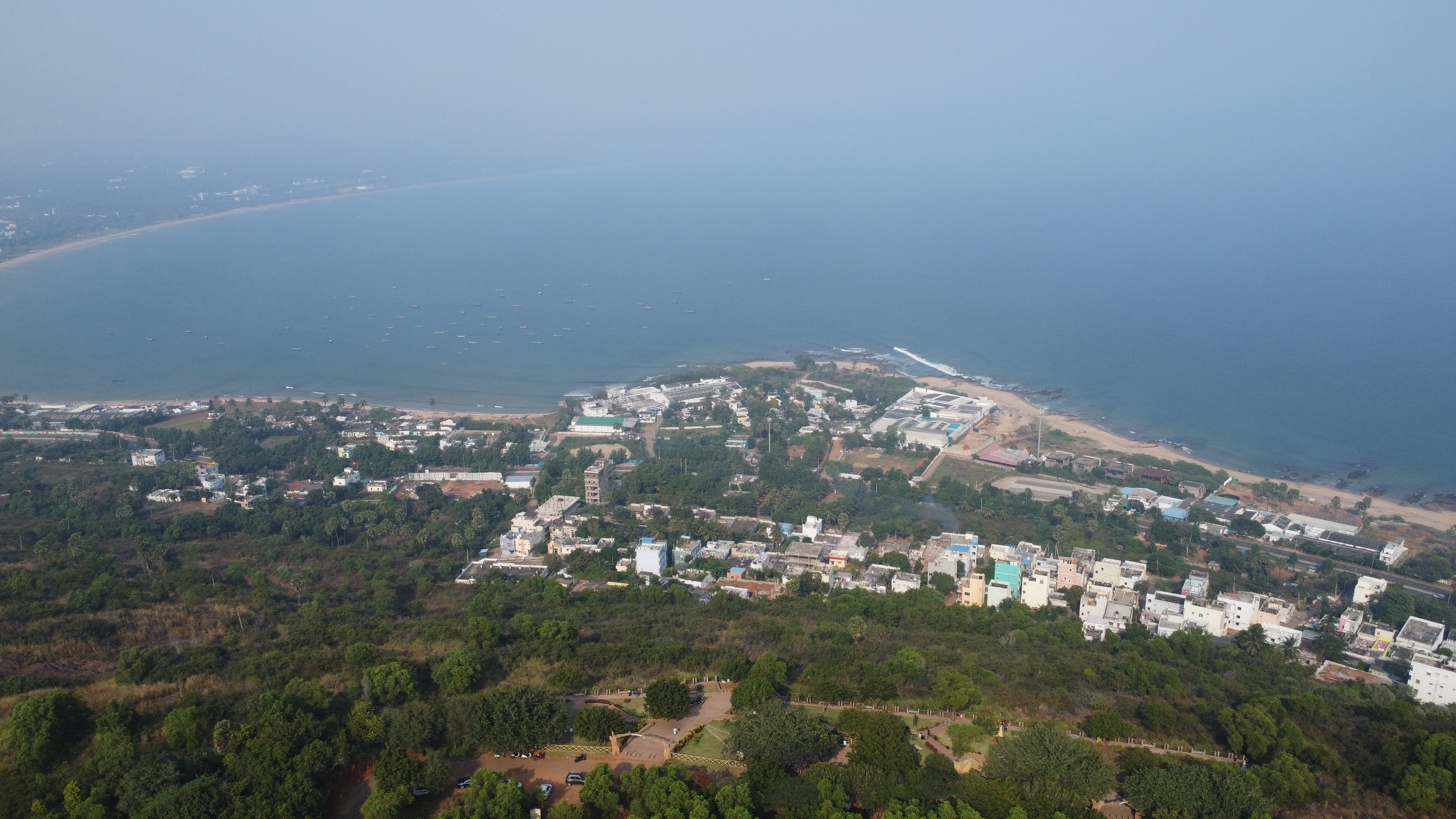
- Bay of Bengal at Mangamaripeta

- Location in Visakhapatnam
- Coordinates: 17.833198°N 83.412932°E
- Country: India
- State: Andhra Pradesh
- District: Visakhapatnam

Government
  - Body: Greater Visakhapatnam Municipal Corporation

Languages
  - Official: Telugu
- Time zone: UTC+5:30 (IST)
- PIN: 531163
- Vehicle registration: AP-31

Mangamaripeta (Telugu: మంగమరి పేట) is a seaside place with a watersport beach in Visakhapatnam, India. It is believed that the region was under the kingdom of Kalingas. Later, the beach served as the promotional centre of Buddhism. The beach is popular for Thotlakonda, a hill embracing a Buddhist complex, located at an elevation of 128 m. above sea level. Mangamaripeta is accessible by Bus Routes 900k or 900T from the Dwaraka bus station via Siripuram, Appugarh and Gitam.

== Landmarks and attractions ==
Among its landmarks is a natural stone arch. Other landmarks include the Thotlakonda Buddhist complex, a seaview park, Mangamaripeta Beach and the Mangamaripeta Bridge.
