= Pappala Chalapathirao =

Indian politician (born 1946)

Member of Parliament
- Constituency: Anakapalli

Personal details
- Born: 1 January 1946 Dimili, Andhra Pradesh
- Party: Telugu Desam Party

Pappala Chalapathirao (born 1 January 1946) was an Indian politician. From 1985 until 2004, he served in the Andhra Pradesh Legislative Assembly. In 2004, he was elected to the 14th Lok Sabha.
