= Uppalapati Kannababu Raju =

Indian politician

Kanna Babu
- Born: Uppalapati Venkata Ramanamurthy Raju; 1954 (age 71–72); Visakhapatnam
- Occupation: Politician
- Years active: 2004-present
- Political party: YSR Congress Party

Uppalapati Venkata Ramanamurthy Raju (born 1954), popularly known as Kanna Babu, is an Indian politician from Andhra Pradesh. He won the 2004 Andhra Pradesh Legislative Assembly Election from Elamanchili Constituency in Visakhapatnam district. He was reelected from the same constituency in the 2009 Andhra Election. YSR Congress Party has nominated Kanna Babu from the Elemanchili Constituency for the 2024 Andhra Pradesh Legislative Assembly Election in May 2024.

== Early life and education ==
He hails from Visakhapatnam district. He was born to Rajan Raju of Seethammadhara, Visakhapatnam, a farmer. He is a businessman. He married Radha Devi. He completed his graduation in commerce from AMAL college, Anakapalli in 1972.

== Career ==
He started his political life with Indian National Congress and was elected as the MLA from Elamanchili Constituency winning the 2004 Andhra Pradesh Legislative Assembly Election defeating Gontina Venkata Nageswara Rao of Telugu Desam Party by 5,863 votes. He was reelected from the same constituency on Congress ticket winning the 2009 Andhra Pradesh Legislative Assembly Election. He won the 2019 Andhra Pradesh Legislative Assembly Election on YSRCP ticket from Elamanchili defeating Panchakarla Ramesh Babu of Telugu Desam Party by a margin of 4,146 votes. In July 2023, he was among the officials who distributed free houses to the poor in Elamanchili district.

The CBI officials searched his residences in the disproportionate assets case in October 2012.
