= Rambilli =

- Village
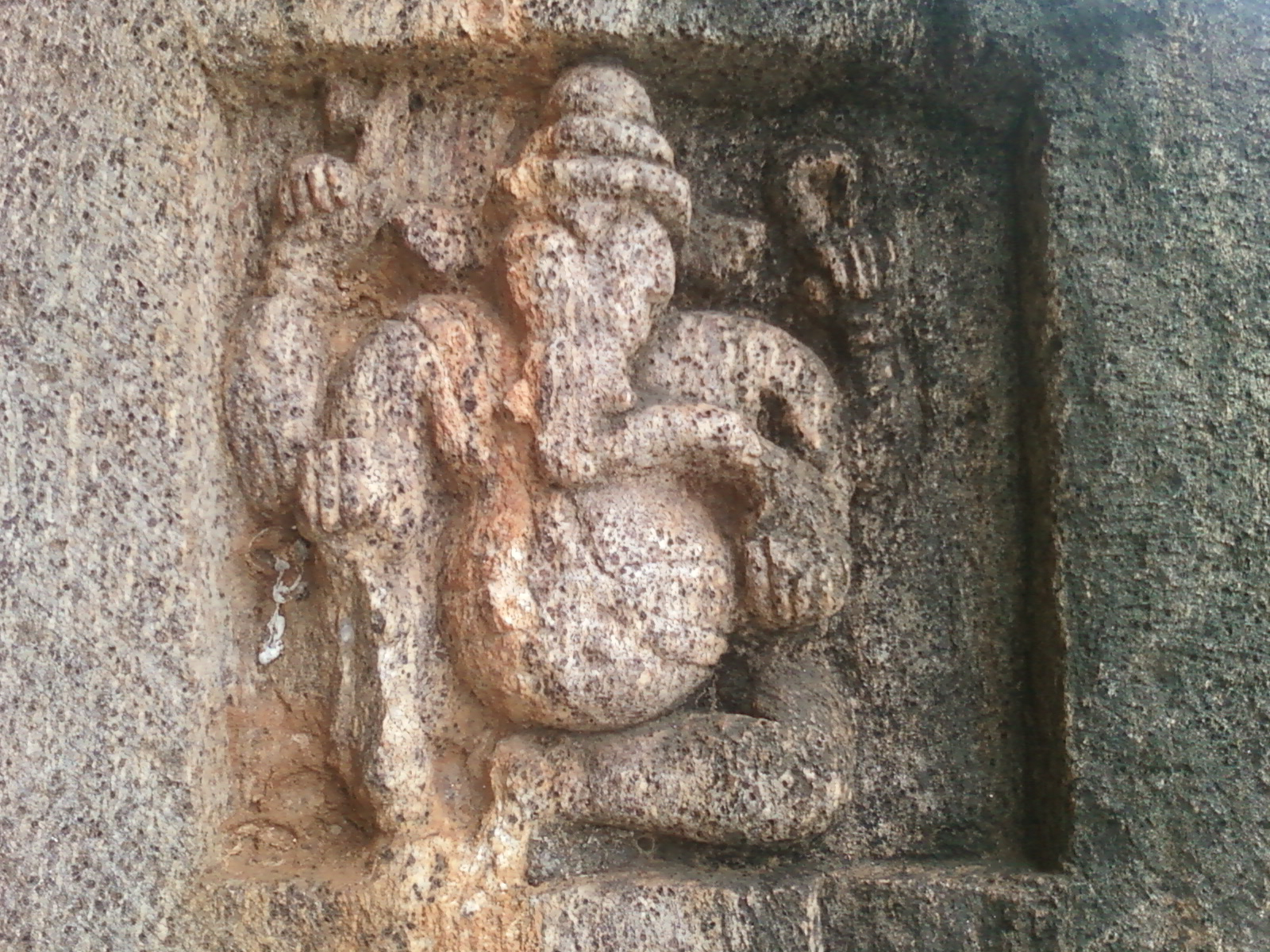
- Stone carved Lord Ganapati at Dharapalem Temple
- Nickname: Konaseema of vizag or Mini konaseema
- Interactive map of Rambilli
- Location in Andhra Pradesh, India Rambilli (India)
- Coordinates: 17°27′52″N 82°55′53″E
- Country: India
- State: Andhra Pradesh
- District: Anakapalli

Languages
  - Official: Telugu
- Time zone: UTC+5:30 (IST)
- PIN: 531 061
- Vehicle Registration: AP31 (Former); AP39 (from 30 January 2019)

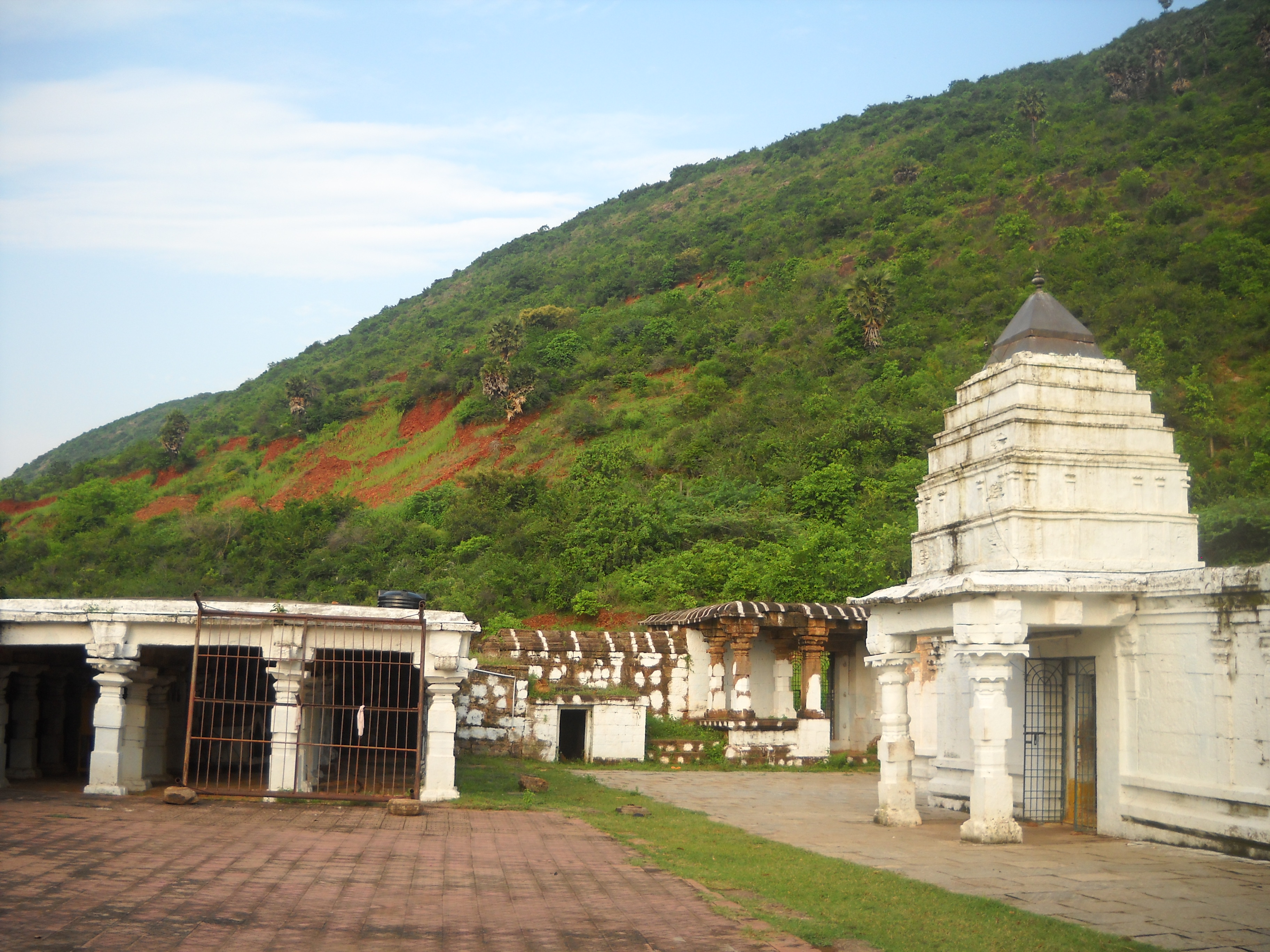
Dharmalingeswara temple at Panchadarla, Rambilli mandal

Rambilli is a village and a Mandal in Anakapalli district in the state of Andhra Pradesh in India. There is a famous Lord Shiva Temple "Sri Dharalingeswara Swamy Temple" in Rambilli mandal at Panchadaarla (meaning five sacred water flows) in Dharapalem village.
